= 2010 Campeonato Ecuatoriano de Fútbol Serie A =

Sportseason in a soccer competition

Copa Credife Serie A
- Season: 2010
- Champions: LDU Quito (10th title)
- Relegated: Universidad Católica; Macará
- 2011 Copa Libertadores: LDU Quito; Emelec; Deportivo Quito
- 2010 Copa Sudamericana: Emelec; Barcelona; Deportivo Quito
- 2011 Copa Sudamericana: LDU Quito
- Matches: 268
- Goals: 644 (2.4 per match)
- Top goalscorer: Jaime Ayoví (23 goals)
- Biggest home win: LDU Quito 5–0 Emelec (February 28); El Nacional 5–0 Emelec (April 20); LDU Quito 5–0 Olmedo (June 20); Deportivo Quito 5–0 Universidad Católica (November 20)
- Biggest away win: ESPOLI 0–4 Independiente José Terán (April 20); Independiente José Terán 0–4 LDU Quito (October 29)
- Highest scoring: ESPOLI 5–3 El Nacional (February 27)

The 2010 Campeonato Ecuatoriano de Fútbol de la Serie A (known as the 2010 Copa Credife Serie A for sponsorship reasons) was the 52nd season of the Serie A, Ecuador's premier football league. It ran from February 7 to December 12.

Emelec and LDU Quito each won the First and Second Stage, respectively, and played each other in the championship finals. LDU Quito won the first leg at home by a score of 2–0. Emelec could not overturn the deficit with a 1–0 win at home in the second leg. LDU Quito won their tenth national title, tying them for third overall with Emelec.

== Format ==
A new format for the 2010 season was announced by the Ecuadorian Football Federation on December 15, 2009. The season was divided into three stages. The First and Second Stages were identical stages with a double round-robin format. Each team played the others twice, once at home and once away. The winners of each stage qualified to play a two-legged tie in the Third Stage for the title. The two highest non-stage winners in the aggregate table of the First and Second Stages played each in another two-legged tie in a Third Stage playoff for third place. Had the same team won both stages, they would have been automatically be crowned the champion. In that case, a two-legged tie would have been held in the Third Stage between the two best-placed teams in the aggregate table to determine who is the runner-up and who finished in third place. The two teams at the bottom of the aggregate table of the first two stages were relegated to the Serie B for the following season.

=== International qualification ===
The two stage winners earned a berth to the 2011 Copa Libertadores. The berth Ecuador 1 went to the champion, Ecuador 2 went to the runner-up, and Ecuador 3 went to the third-place finisher. Teams also qualified to two Copa Sudamericanas. The top-three teams in the First Stage qualified to the 2010 Copa Sudamericana (except LDU Quito, who had a berth as the defending Copa Sudamericana champion). The winner of the Second Stage earned the Ecuador 1 berth for the 2011 Copa Sudamericana.

== Teams ==
Twelve teams competed in the 2010 Serie A season, ten of whom remained from the 2009 season. LDU Portoviejo and Técnico Universitario were relegated last season to the Serie B after accumulating the fewest points in the First and Second Stage aggregate table. They were replaced by Independiente José Terán and Universidad Católica, the 2009 Serie B winner and runner-up, respectively. This was Universidad Católica's 27th season in the Serie A, having last played in the league in 2008. This was Independiente José Terán's first season in the Serie A.

One team used a different stadium this season. ESPOLI chose to move from Estadio La Cocha in Latacunga to Estadio Olímpico Municipal Etho Vega in Santo Domingo de Los Colorados.

Locations of the 2010 Serie A teams

| Team | Home city | Home ground | Manager |
|---|---|---|---|
| Barcelona | Guayaquil | Monumental Banco Pichincha | Rubén Darío Insúa |
| Deportivo Cuenca | Cuenca | Alejandro Serrano Aguilar | Luis Soler |
| Deportivo Quito | Quito | Olímpico Atahualpa | Carlos Sevilla |
| El Nacional | Quito | Olímpico Atahualpa | Mario Saralegui |
| Emelec | Guayaquil | George Capwell | Jorge Sampaoli |
| ESPOLI | Quito | Olímpico Municipal Etho Vega | Carlos Calderón |
| Independiente José Terán | Sangolquí | Rumiñahui | Julio Asad |
| LDU Quito (details) | Quito | Casa Blanca | Edgardo Bauza |
| Macará | Ambato | Bellavista | Janio Pinto |
| Manta | Manta | Jocay | Fabián Bustos |
| Olmedo | Riobamba | Olímpico | Vacant |
| Universidad Católica | Quito | Olímpico Atahualpa | Jorge Célico |

=== Managerial changes ===
| Team | Outgoing manager | Manner of departure | Date of vacancy | Replaced by | Date of appointment | Position in table |
Pre-season changes
| ESPOLI | Homero Valencia | Replaced | November 22, 2009 | Carlos Calderón | November 23, 2009 | N/A |
| El Nacional | Julio Asad | End of contract | November 21, 2009 | Jorge Luis Pinto | December 4, 2009 | N/A |
| LDU Quito | Jorge Fossati | Resigned | December 7, 2009 | Edgardo Bauza | December 8, 2009 | N/A |
| Emelec | Gabriel Perrone | Resigned | December 16, 2009 | Jorge Sampaoli | December 18, 2009 | N/A |
| Olmedo | Héctor González | Replaced | December 16, 2009 | Claudio Otermín | December 16, 2009 | N/A |
First Stage changes
| Universidad Católica | Renato Salas | Sacked | March 1, 2010 | Hans Ortega (IM) | March 1, 2010 | 11th |
| Universidad Católica | Hans Ortega (IM) | Replaced | March 3, 2010 | Fernando Díaz | March 3, 2010 | 11th |
| Olmedo | Claudio Otermín | Sacked | March 13, 2010 | Héctor González (IM) | March 16, 2010 | 12th |
| Macará | Víctor Marchesini | Sacked | March 15, 2010 | Carlos Sevilla | March 16, 2010 | 6th |
| Independiente José Terán | Janio Pinto | Resigned | April 27, 2010 | Guillermo Duró | May 12, 2010 | 7th |
| Olmedo | Héctor González (IM) | Replaced | April 28, 2010 | Ariel Graziani | April 29, 2010 | 12th |
| Universidad Católica | Fernando Díaz | Replaced | June 7, 2010 | Patricio Lara | June 7, 2010 | 12th |
| El Nacional | Jorge Luis Pinto | Sacked | June 9, 2010 | Perdomo Véliz Jare | June 9, 2010 | 9th |
| Deportivo Cuenca | Paúl Vélez | Resigned | June 22, 2010 | Juan Carlos Benítez (IM) | June 23, 2010 | 5th |
| Macará | Carlos Sevilla | Sacked | June 29, 2010 | Boris Fiallos (IM) | July 7, 2010 | 12th |
Inter-stage changes
| Macará | Boris Fiallos (IM) | Replaced | July 6, 2010 | Víctor Riggio | July 6, 2010 | N/A |
| Deportivo Cuenca | Juan Carlos Benítez (IM) | Replaced | July 8, 2010 | Luis Soler | July 8, 2010 | N/A |
Second Stage changes
| Deportivo Quito | Rubén Darío Insúa | Mutual agreement | August 12, 2010 | Carlos Sevilla | August 13, 2010 | 8th |
| El Nacional | Perdomo Véliz Jare | Sacked | August 23, 2010 | Mario Saralegui | August 23, 2010 | 10th |
| Macará | Víctor Riggio | Sacked | September 13, 2010 | Janio Pinto | September 14, 2010 | 8th |
| Universidad Católica | Patricio Lara | Resigned | September 19, 2010 | Hans Ortega (IM) | September 21, 2010 | 10th |
| Independiente José Terán | Guillermo Duró | Promoted to Sporting Director | September 21, 2010 | Julio Asad | September 21, 2010 | 12th |
| Universidad Católica | Hans Ortega (IM) | Replaced | September 21, 2010 | Jorge Célico | September 21, 2010 | 10th |
| Barcelona | Juan Manuel Llop | Resigned | September 27, 2010 | Carlos Gruezo (IM); Walter Guerrero (IM) | September 27, 2010 | 3rd |
| Barcelona | Carlos Gruezo (IM); Walter Guerrero (IM) | Replaced | October 2, 2010 | Rubén Darío Insúa | October 2, 2010 | 5th |
| Olmedo | Ariel Graziani | Resigned | November 13, 2010 | TBD | TBD | 8th |

  - IM: Interim manager(s).

== First stage ==
The first stage (Spanish: Primera Etapa) began on February 7 and ended on July 4. Emelec won the stage and qualified to the championship playoff.

=== Standings ===
| Pos | Team | Pld | W | D | L | GF | GA | GD | Pts | Qualification |
|---|---|---|---|---|---|---|---|---|---|---|
| 1 | Emelec | 22 | 14 | 4 | 4 | 36 | 21 | +15 | 46 | Finals, the 2010 Copa Sudamericana Second Stage, and the 2011 Copa Libertadores Second Stage |
| 2 | LDU Quito | 22 | 12 | 8 | 2 | 36 | 10 | +26 | 44 | 2010 Copa Sudamericana Round of 16 (Note: LDU Quito was already qualified to the 2010 Copa Sudamericana as the defending champion.) |
| 3 | Barcelona | 22 | 12 | 7 | 3 | 26 | 12 | +14 | 43 | 2010 Copa Sudamericana First Stage |
| 4 | Deportivo Quito | 22 | 10 | 4 | 8 | 27 | 23 | +4 | 34 | 2010 Copa Sudamericana First Stage |
| 5 | Deportivo Cuenca | 22 | 6 | 9 | 7 | 21 | 25 | −4 | 27 | |
| 6 | El Nacional | 22 | 5 | 10 | 7 | 34 | 27 | +7 | 25 | |
| 7 | Independiente José Terán | 22 | 5 | 10 | 7 | 26 | 30 | −4 | 25 | |
| 8 | Manta | 22 | 5 | 9 | 8 | 24 | 31 | −7 | 24 | |
| 9 | Olmedo | 22 | 5 | 8 | 9 | 19 | 28 | −9 | 23 | |
| 10 | ESPOLI | 22 | 6 | 4 | 12 | 22 | 41 | −19 | 22 | |
| 11 | Universidad Católica | 22 | 4 | 8 | 10 | 21 | 32 | −11 | 20 | |
| 12 | Macará | 22 | 3 | 9 | 10 | 22 | 34 | −12 | 18 | |

Rules for classification: 1st points; 2nd goal difference; 3rd number of goals scored.

=== Results ===
| Home \ Away | BAR | CUE | QUI | NAC | EME | ESP | IJT | LDQ | MAC | MAN | OLM | CAT |
|---|---|---|---|---|---|---|---|---|---|---|---|---|
| Barcelona | — | 2–1 | 1–0 | 1–0 | 1–2 | 2–0 | 0–1 | 0–0 | 2–0 | 2–1 | 1–0 (Note: The match was played at Estadio Olímpico Atahualpa in Quito because Barcelona was suspended from playing in their home stadium for one match.) | 5–1 |
| Deportivo Cuenca | 1–1 | — | 1–0 | 0–0 | 2–0 | 3–0 | 3–0 | 1–1 | 0–1 | 0–0 | 0–1 | 1–0 |
| Deportivo Quito | 0–1 | 1–1 | — | 1–3 | 1–0 | 2–0 | 3–2 | 0–1 | 2–0 | 2–1 | 2–0 | 2–0 |
| El Nacional | 0–0 | 0–0 | 2–1 | — | 5–0 | 4–0 | 1–1 | 0–0 | 1–1 | 4–0 | 2–2 | 1–2 |
| Emelec | 3–0 | 4–0 | 1–1 | 1–0 | — | 4–0 | 1–1 | 1–0 | 2–0 | 3–3 | 4–1 | 1–0 |
| ESPOLI | 0–1 | 3–0 | 0–3 | 5–3 | 0–3 | — | 0–4 | 2–1 | 0–1 | 2–0 | 2–2 | 0–1 |
| Independiente José Terán | 1–1 | 2–2 | 2–2 | 3–1 | 0–0 | 1–2 | — | 0–2 | 0–0 | 1–0 | 1–1 | 1–1 |
| LDU Quito | 0–0 | 2–0 | 2–0 | 1–0 | 5–0 | 1–1 | 3–0 | — | 3–1 | 3–0 | 5–0 | 2–1 |
| Macará | 1–2 | 1–2 | 1–2 | 3–3 | 1–2 | 1–1 | 1–1 | 2–2 | — | 2–2 | 0–2 | 1–1 |
| Manta | 0–0 | 1–1 | 3–0 | 2–2 | 1–3 | 1–0 | 3–1 | 0–0 | 2–1 | — | 1–0 | 1–1 |
| Olmedo | 0–0 | 1–1 | 0–1 | 2–1 | 0–1 | 1–1 | 2–3 | 0–1 | 0–0 | 1–0 (Note: The match was played at Estadio Bellavista in Ambato because Olmedo was suspended from playing in their home stadium for one match.) | — | 2–0 |
| Universidad Católica | 0–3 | 3–1 | 1–1 | 1–1 | 0–1 | 2–3 | 2–0 | 1–1 | 2–3 | 1–1 | 0–0 | — |

Legend: Blue = home team win; Yellow = draw; Red = away team win.

== Second stage ==
The second stage (Spanish: Segunda Etapa) began July 9 and ended on November 27. LDU Quito won the stage and qualified to the championship playoff.

=== Standings ===
| Pos | Team | Pld | W | D | L | GF | GA | GD | Pts | Qualification |
|---|---|---|---|---|---|---|---|---|---|---|
| 1 | LDU Quito | 22 | 14 | 5 | 3 | 42 | 17 | +25 | 47 | Finals, the 2011 Copa Sudamericana First Stage, and the 2011 Copa Libertadores Second Stage |
| 2 | Emelec | 22 | 13 | 7 | 2 | 29 | 12 | +17 | 46 | |
| 3 | Deportivo Cuenca | 22 | 12 | 5 | 5 | 32 | 25 | +7 | 41 | |
| 4 | Deportivo Quito | 22 | 11 | 4 | 7 | 35 | 22 | +13 | 37 | |
| 5 | Barcelona | 22 | 8 | 6 | 8 | 25 | 24 | +1 | 30 | |
| 6 | El Nacional | 22 | 8 | 5 | 9 | 23 | 23 | 0 | 29 | |
| 7 | Manta | 22 | 7 | 6 | 9 | 23 | 33 | −10 | 27 | |
| 8 | Olmedo | 22 | 6 | 5 | 11 | 20 | 33 | −13 | 23 | |
| 9 | ESPOLI | 22 | 5 | 8 | 9 | 22 | 28 | −6 | 23 | |
| 10 | Macará | 22 | 5 | 6 | 11 | 21 | 32 | −11 | 21 | |
| 11 | U. Católica | 22 | 5 | 5 | 12 | 27 | 37 | −10 | 20 | |
| 12 | Independiente José Terán | 22 | 5 | 4 | 13 | 23 | 36 | −13 | 19 | |

Rules for classification: 1) points; 2) goal difference; 3) number of goals scored.

=== Results ===
| Home \ Away | BAR | CUE | QUI | NAC | EME | ESP | IJT | LDQ | MAC | MAN | OLM | CAT |
|---|---|---|---|---|---|---|---|---|---|---|---|---|
| Barcelona | — | 1–2 | 1–0 | 1–2 | 0–0 | 0–3 | 3–0 | 1–1 | 2–1 | 1–2 | 2–0 | 5–1 |
| Deportivo Cuenca | 1–0 | — | 2–0 | 0–0 | 1–1 | 2–1 | 3–1 | 1–1 | 0–2 | 3–1 | 2–3 | 2–1 |
| Deportivo Quito | 4–0 | 1–2 | — | 1–0 | 1–0 | 2–0 | 1–1 | 1–1 | 0–0 | 4–0 | 1–0 | 5–0 |
| El Nacional | 0–1 | 0–0 | 1–3 | — | 0–0 | 0–0 | 3–0 | 2–3 | 2–1 (Note: The match was played at Estadio Rumiñahui in Sangolquí because Universidad Católica played a home match at Estadio Olímpico Atahualpa at the same date and time.) | 4–0 | 3–1 | 0–1 |
| Emelec | 0–0 | 0–1 | 2–1 | 2–0 | — | 3–1 | 2–1 | 1–1 | 2–0 | 0–0 | 1–0 | 2–0 |
| ESPOLI | 0–0 | 2–5 | 2–3 (Note: The match was played at Estadio 7 de Octubre in Quevedo.) | 0–1 | 1–1 | — | 1–0 | 0–1 | 1–1 | 1–0 | 3–0 | 2–1 |
| Independiente José Terán | 1–2 | 3–0 | 1–2 | 0–1 | 0–1 | 1–1 | — | 0–4 | 3–1 | 2–2 | 1–1 | 1–3 |
| LDU Quito | 2–1 | 2–0 | 1–1 | 2–1 | 0–1 | 3–0 | 2–0 | — | 3–0 | 4–2 | 1–0 | 1–0 |
| Macará | 1–1 | 1–2 | 1–0 | 4–1 | 1–4 | 1–1 | 0–2 | 2–4 | — | 1–1 | 0–1 | 1–0 |
| Manta | 1–0 | 2–0 | 1–2 | 1–0 | 1–2 | 0–0 | 0–2 | 1–0 | 1–0 | — | 3–0 | 2–2 |
| Olmedo | 0–1 | 0–0 | 3–2 | 1–1 | 0–1 | 3–2 | 2–1 | 0–3 | 0–1 | 2–2 | — | 1–1 |
| Universidad Católica | 2–2 | 2–3 | 3–0 | 0–1 | 2–3 | 0–0 | 1–2 | 2–1 | 1–1 | 3–0 | 1–2 | — |

Legend: Blue = home team win; Yellow = draw; Red = away team win.

== Aggregate table ==
| Pos | Team | Pld | W | D | L | GF | GA | GD | Pts | Qualification or relegation |
|---|---|---|---|---|---|---|---|---|---|---|
| 1 | Emelec | 44 | 27 | 11 | 6 | 66 | 34 | +32 | 92 | |
| 2 | LDU Quito | 44 | 26 | 13 | 5 | 78 | 27 | +51 | 91 | |
| 3 | Barcelona | 44 | 20 | 13 | 11 | 51 | 36 | +15 | 73 | Third Place Play-off |
| 4 | Deportivo Quito | 44 | 21 | 8 | 15 | 62 | 45 | +17 | 71 | Third Place Play-off |
| 5 | Cuenca | 44 | 18 | 14 | 12 | 53 | 49 | +4 | 68 | |
| 6 | El Nacional | 44 | 13 | 15 | 16 | 57 | 50 | +7 | 54 | |
| 7 | Manta | 44 | 12 | 15 | 17 | 46 | 63 | −17 | 51 | |
| 8 | Olmedo | 44 | 11 | 13 | 20 | 38 | 60 | −22 | 46 | |
| 9 | ESPOLI | 44 | 11 | 12 | 21 | 44 | 69 | −25 | 45 | |
| 10 | Independiente José Terán | 44 | 10 | 14 | 20 | 49 | 67 | −18 | 44 | |
| 11 | Universidad Católica | 44 | 9 | 13 | 22 | 48 | 69 | −21 | 40 | Relegated to the Serie B |
| 12 | Macará | 44 | 8 | 15 | 21 | 43 | 66 | −23 | 39 | Relegated to the Serie B |

Rules for classification: 1) points; 2) goal difference; 3) number of goals scored.

== Third stage ==
The Third Stage began on December 4 and ended on December 12. Both ties in the Third Stage were determined by points. If there was a tie in points, the tie-breakers to be used in order were goal difference, away goals, and a penalty shoot-out.

=== Third-place playoff ===
Deportivo Quito and Barcelona qualified to the Third-place Playoff by being the two best non-stage winners in the aggregate table. The winner of the playoff earned the Ecuador 3 berth in the 2011 Copa Libertadores. By having the greater number of points in the aggregate table, Barcelona played the second leg as the home team.

| Pos | Team | Pld | W | D | L | GF | GA | GD | Pts | Qualification |
|---|---|---|---|---|---|---|---|---|---|---|
| 1 | Deportivo Quito | 2 | 1 | 0 | 1 | 3 | 3 | 0 | 3 | 2011 Copa Libertadores First Stage |
| 2 | Barcelona | 2 | 1 | 0 | 1 | 3 | 3 | 0 | 3 | |

December 4
11:30 UTC−05:00

| Deportivo Quito | 2–0 | Barcelona |
|---|---|---|
| Checa 35'; Saritama 49' | Report |

Estadio Olímpico Atahualpa, Quito
Attendance: 24,208
Referee: Omar Ponce

December 12
17:00 UTC−05:00

| Barcelona | 3–1 | Deportivo Quito |
|---|---|---|
| León 16'; Samudio 73'; Anangonó 89' | Report | Minda 25' |

Estadio Monumental Banco Pichincha, Guayaquil
Attendance: 10,262
Referee: José Caprio

=== Finals ===
Emelec and LDU Quito qualified to the Finals by being the First Stage and Second Stage winners, respectively. The winner was the Serie A champion and earned the Ecuador 1 berth in the 2011 Copa Libertadores. By having the greater number of points in the aggregate table, Emelec played the second leg as the home team.

| Pos | Team | Pld | W | D | L | GF | GA | GD | Pts |
|---|---|---|---|---|---|---|---|---|---|
| 1 | LDU Quito | 2 | 1 | 0 | 1 | 2 | 1 | +1 | 3 |
| 2 | Emelec | 2 | 1 | 0 | 1 | 1 | 2 | −1 | 3 |

Copa Credife Serie A
2010 champion

10th title

December 5
11:30 UTC−05:00

| LDU Quito | 2–0 | Emelec |
|---|---|---|
| Bolaños 50', 90+2' | Report |

Estadio Casa Blanca, Quito
Attendance: 27,506
Referee: Tomás Alarcón

| LDU Quito | Emelec |

LDU QUITO:
| GK | 1 | José Francisco Cevallos |
| DF | 2 | Norberto Araujo |
| DF | 14 | Diego Calderón | (yellow card) 9' |
| DF | 6 | Jorge Guagua |
| MF | 15 | William Araujo |
| MF | 7 | Miller Bolaños | (yellow card) 51' |
| MF | 4 | Ulises de la Cruz | (yellow card) 39' |
| MF | 54 | Marlon Ganchozo | | (substituted off) 72' |
| MF | 13 | Néicer Reasco (c) | (yellow card) 64' |
| FW | 15 | Carlos Luna | | (substituted off) 59' |
| FW | 19 | Juan Manuel Salgueiro | | (substituted off) 76' |
Substitutes:
| GK | 22 | Alexander Domínguez |
| MF | 9 | Gonzalo Chila | | (substituted on) 72' |
| MF | 24 | José Valencia | | (substituted on) 76' |
| FW | 10 | Walter Calderón | | (substituted on) 59' |
| FW | 10 | Christian Lara |
| FW | 53 | Joao Plata |
Manager:
Edgardo Bauza

EMELEC:
| GK | 22 | Javier Klimowicz |
| DF | 29 | Gabriel Achilier |
| DF | 25 | Eduardo Morante |
| DF | 6 | Carlos Andrés Quiñónez |
| DF | 9 | José Luis Quiñónez |
| MF | 51 | Fernando Gaibor | | (substituted off) 46' |
| MF | 24 | Fernando Giménez |
| MF | 15 | Pedro Quiñónez | (yellow card) 69' |
| MF | 7 | David Quiroz (c) |
| FW | 17 | Jaime Ayoví |
| FW | 10 | Joao Rojas | | (substituted off) 58' |
Substitutes:
| GK | 1 | Marcelo Elizaga |
| DF | 27 | Mariano Mina |
| MF | 52 | Byron Mina |
| MF | 14 | Énner Valencia | | (substituted on) 46' |
| MF | 8 | Polo Wila |
| FW | 50 | Marco Caicedo |
| FW | 40 | Leandro Torres | | (substituted on) 58' |
Manager:
Jorge Sampaoli

Assistant referees:
Carlos Herrera
Marco Muzo
Fourth official:
Miguel Hidalgo

December 12
16:00 UTC−05:00

| Emelec | 1–0 | LDU Quito |
|---|---|---|
| Quiroz 60' | Report |

Estadio George Capwell, Guayaquil
Attendance: 23,112
Referee: Carlos Vera

| Emelec | LDU Quito |

EMELEC:
| GK | 22 | Javier Klimowicz |
| DF | 29 | Gabriel Achilier | | (substituted off) 45' |
| DF | 19 | Marcelo Fleitas (c) | (yellow card) 64' |
| DF | 25 | Eduardo Morante |
| MF | 51 | Fernando Gaibor | | (substituted off) 45' |
| MF | 24 | Fernando Giménez | (yellow card) 86' |
| MF | 15 | Pedro Quiñónez | (yellow card) 77' |
| MF | 7 | David Quiroz |
| MF | 10 | Joao Rojas | | (substituted off) 68' |
| FW | 17 | Jaime Ayoví |
| FW | 23 | Cristian Menéndez |
Substitutes:
| GK | 1 | Marcelo Elizaga |
| DF | 6 | Carlos Andrés Quiñónez | | (substituted on) 45' |
| MF | 9 | José Luis Quiñónez |
| MF | 40 | Leandro Torres | | (substituted on) 45' |
| FW | 16 | Santiago Biglieri | | (substituted on) 68' |
| FW | 50 | Marco Caicedo |
Manager:
Jorge Sampaoli

LDU QUITO:
| GK | 1 | José Francisco Cevallos | (yellow card) 90+4' (red card) |
| DF | 2 | Norberto Araujo |
| DF | 14 | Diego Calderón |
| DF | 6 | Jorge Guagua | (yellow card) 45' |
| MF | 15 | William Araujo |
| MF | 4 | Ulises de la Cruz |
| MF | 54 | Marlon Ganchozo | (yellow card) 43' | (substituted off) 55' |
| MF | 13 | Néicer Reasco (c) | (yellow card) 87' |
| MF | 8 | Patricio Urrutia |
| FW | 15 | Carlos Luna | | (substituted off) 84' |
| FW | 19 | Juan Manuel Salgueiro | | (substituted off) 64' |
Substitutes:
| GK | 22 | Alexander Domínguez |
| DF | 5 | Paúl Ambrosi |
| DF | 24 | José Valencia | | (substituted on) 55' |
| MF | 7 | Miller Bolaños | (yellow card) 90+1' (red card) | (substituted on) 64' |
| MF | 53 | Joao Plata |
| FW | 10 | Walter Calderón | | (substituted on) 84' |
Manager:
Edgardo Bauza

Assistant referees:
Juan Cedeño
Luis Alvarado
Fourth official:
Alfredo Intriago

== Top goalscorers ==
| Pos | Player | Nationality | Club | Goals |
|---|---|---|---|---|
| 1 | Jaime Ayoví | Ecuadorian | Emelec | 23 |
| 2 | Hernán Barcos | Argentine | LDU Quito | 22 |
| 2 | Julio Bevacqua | Argentine | Manta | 22 |
| 4 | Luis Miguel Escalada | Argentine | Deportivo Cuenca | 15 |
| 4 | Richard Estigarribia | Paraguayan | Independiente José Terán | 15 |
| 6 | Juan Samudio | Paraguayan | Barcelona | 14 |
| 7 | Marlon de Jesús | Ecuadorian | El Nacional | 12 |
| 7 | Omar Guerra | Colombian | Universidad Católica | 12 |
| 7 | Cristian Suárez | Ecuadorian | El Nacional | 12 |
| 10 | Lenín de Jesús | Ecuadorian | ESPOLI | 11 |

== Statistics ==
- Longest winning streak: 7 games — Emelec (May 30–June 27)
- Longest unbeaten streak: 15 games — LDU Quito (February 7–June 2; June 19–September 25)
- Longest losing streak: 6 games — Barcelona (September 18–October 20)
- Largest home win: LDU Quito 5–0 Emelec (February 28); El Nacional 5–0 Emelec (April 20); LDU Quito 5–0 Olmedo (June 20); Deportivo Quito 5–0 Universidad Católica (November 20)
- Largest away win: ESPOLI 0–4 Independiente José Terán (April 20); Independiente José Terán 0–4 LDU Quito (October 29)
- Highest scoring game: ESPOLI 5–3 El Nacional (February 27)

== Awards ==
The awards were selected by the Asociación Ecuatoriana de Radiodifusión.

- Best player: Jaime Ayoví (Emelec)
- Best goalkeeper: José Francisco Cevallos (LDU Quito)
- Best defender: Marcelo Fleitas (Emelec)
- Best midfielder: David Quiroz (Emelec)
- Best striker: Hernán Barcos (LDU Quito)
- Best young player: Dennys Quiñónez (Barcelona)
- Best manager: Edgardo Bauza (LDU Quito)
- Best Ecuadorian playing abroad: Christian Benítez (Santos Laguna)
- Best referee: Carlos Vera
