= 2011 Campeonato Ecuatoriano de Fútbol Serie A =

Copa Credife Serie A
- Season: 2011
- Champions: Deportivo Quito
- Relegated: Imbabura; ESPOLI
- 2012 Copa Libertadores: Emelec; Deportivo Quito; El Nacional
- 2011 Copa Sudamericana: Emelec; Deportivo Quito
- 2012 Copa Sudamericana: Deportivo Quito
- Matches: 264
- Goals: 672 (2.55 per match)
- Top goalscorer: Narciso Mina (28 goals)
- Biggest home win: LDU Quito 6–0 Manta (August 13)
- Biggest away win: Independiente José Terán 1–6 Deportivo Quito (March 5)
- Highest scoring: Independiente José Terán 3–6 LDU Loja (August 13)
- Longest winning run: Deportivo Quito — 8 matches (July 23–August 28)
- Longest unbeaten run: LDU Quito — 12 matches (February 6–April 23); Deportivo Quito — 12 matches (July 23–October 19)
- Longest winless run: Imbabura — 8 matches (January 30–March 9)
- Longest losing run: Imbabura — 5 matches (February 17–March 9)

The 2011 Campeonato Ecuatoriano de Fútbol de la Serie A (known as the 2011 Copa Credife Serie A for sponsorship reasons) was the 53rd season of the Serie A, Ecuador's premier football league. The season began on January 30 and ended on December 18, with a break in July for the 2011 Copa América. LDU Quito is the defending champion.

== Format ==
After a session of the preliminary meeting of the Congress of Professional Football of the Ecuadorian Football Federation (Spanish: Congreso Ordinario del Fútbol Profesional de la Federación Ecuatoriana de Fútbol), it was determined that the format for the 2011 season will be the same as the previous season.

== Teams ==
Twelve teams will compete in the 2011 Serie A season, ten of whom remain from the previous season. Macará and Universidad Católica were relegated last season after accumulating the fewest points in the 2010 season aggregate table. They were replaced by LDU Loja and Imbabura, the 2010 Serie B winner and runner-up, respectively. This will be both clubs' second season in the league. LDU Loja played their only season in 2005 and Imbabura played their only season in 2007.

Locations of the 2011 Serie A teams.

Team	Home city	Home ground	Current manager
Barcelona	Guayaquil	Monumental Banco Pichincha	Luis Zubeldía
Deportivo Cuenca	Cuenca	Alejandro Serrano Aguilar	Luis Soler
Deportivo Quito	Quito	Olímpico Atahualpa	Carlos Ischia
El Nacional	Quito	Olímpico Atahualpa	Mario Saralegui
Emelec	Guayaquil	George Capwell	Marcelo Fleitas
ESPOLI	Quito	Olímpico Municipal Etho Vega (Note: Located in Santo Domingo de Los Colorados.)	Eduardo Granda
Imbabura	Ibarra	Olímpico de Ibarra	Janio Pinto
Independiente José Terán	Sangolquí	Rumiñahui	Carlos Sevilla
LDU Loja	Loja	Federativo Reina del Cisne	Diego Ochoa
LDU Quito (details)	Quito	Casa Blanca	Edgardo Bauza
Manta	Manta	Jocay	Armando Osma
Olmedo	Riobamba	Olímpico de Riobamba	Dragan Miranovic

=== Managerial changes ===
Team	Outgoing manager	Manner of departure	Date of vacancy	Replaced by	Date of appointment	Position in table
Pre-season changes
Olmedo	Ariel Graziani	Resigned	November 13, 2010	Dragan Miranovic	December 16, 2010	N/A
Manta	Fabián Bustos	Mutual agreement	December 8, 2010	Gabriel Perrone	December 14, 2010	N/A
Emelec	Jorge Sampaoli	Mutual agreement	December 15, 2010	Omar Asad	December 24, 2010	N/A
Deportivo Quito	Carlos Sevilla	Mutual agreement	December 17, 2010	Fabián Bustos	December 21, 2010	N/A
First Stage changes
ESPOLI	Carlos Calderón	Resigned	February 16, 2011	Santiago Ostolaza	February 17, 2011	12th
Imbabura	Wilson Armas	Resigned	March 11, 2011	Eduardo Granda	March 11, 2011	12th
Barcelona	Rubén Darío Insúa	Sacked	March 25, 2011	Álex Aguinaga	March 25, 2011	9th
Independiente José Terán	Julio Asad	Sacked	April 17, 2011	Carlos Sevilla	April 17, 2011	12th
LDU Loja	Homero Valencia	Mutual consent	April 24, 2011	Diego Ochoa (Note: Interim manager.)	April 24, 2011	8th
Deportivo Quito	Fabián Bustos	Sacked	May 1, 2011	Juan Carlos Garay	May 1, 2011	3rd
Manta	Gabriel Perrone	Sacked	May 2, 2011	Carlos Pico (Note: Carlos Pico began as the interim manager, but was given the manager position full-time on May 24, 2011.)	May 2, 2011	10th
LDU Loja	Diego Ochoa	Replaced	May 5, 2011	Jorge Habegger	May 5, 2011	7th
Deportivo Quito	Juan Carlos Garay	Replaced	May 6, 2011	Carlos Ischia	May 6, 2011	3rd
Emelec	Omar Asad	Contract rescinded	May 26, 2011	Juan Ramón Silva	May 26, 2011	2nd
Barcelona	Álex Aguinaga	Resigned	May 27, 2011	Raúl Noriega	May 27, 2011	9th
Inter-stage changes
Imbabura	Eduardo Granda	Mutual consent	June 20, 2011	Fabián Bustos	June 27, 2011	N/A
Barcelona	Raúl Noriega	Replaced	June 23, 2011	Luis Zubeldía	June 23, 2011	N/A
Emelec	Juan Ramón Silva	Replaced	July 8, 2011	Juan Ramón Carrasco	July 8, 2011	N/A
Second Stage changes
Imbabura	Fabián Bustos	Resigned	August 25, 2011	Janio Pinto	September 1, 2011	10th
Manta	Carlos Pico	Resigned	August 28, 2011	Armando Osma	August 31, 2011	12th
LDU Loja	Jorge Habegger	Resigned	September 4, 2011	Diego Ochoa	September 4, 2011	9th
ESPOLI	Santiago Ostolaza	Sacked	September 8, 2011	Eduardo Granda	September 8, 2011	11th
Emelec	Juan Ramón Carrasco	Resigned	November 27, 2011	Juan Ramón Silva	November 27, 2011	3rd
Emelec	Juan Ramón Silva	Replaced	November 27, 2011	Marcelo Fleitas	November 27, 2011	3rd

== First stage ==
The first stage (Spanish: Primera Etapa) began on January 30 and ended on June 19. Emelec won the stage.

=== Standings ===
Pos	Team	Pld	W	D	L	GF	GA	GD	Pts	Qualification
1	Emelec	22	12	8	2	31	15	+16	44	Finals, 2012 Copa Libertadores Second Stage, and 2011 Copa Sudamericana Second Stage
2	LDU Quito	22	11	7	4	29	13	+16	40	
3	Deportivo Quito	22	11	6	5	39	25	+14	39	2011 Copa Sudamericana First Stage (Note: Since LDU Quito was already qualified to the 2011 Copa Sudamericana First Stage as the winner of the 2010 Serie A Second Stage, Deportivo Quito also qualified to the 2011 Copa Sudamericana First Stage.)
4	El Nacional	22	9	5	8	31	23	+8	32	
5	LDU Loja	22	9	5	8	27	27	0	32	
6	Deportivo Cuenca	22	8	7	7	27	30	−3	31	
7	Olmedo	22	8	5	9	27	32	−5	29	
8	Barcelona	22	6	9	7	22	23	−1	27	
9	Manta	22	7	6	9	20	26	−6	27	
10	Imbabura	22	6	5	11	25	33	−8	23	
11	Independiente José Terán	22	4	7	11	29	44	−15	19	
12	ESPOLI	22	3	6	13	20	38	−18	15	

Rules for classification: 1) points; 2) goal difference; 3) number of goals scored.

=== Results ===
Home \ Away	BAR	CUE	QUI	NAC	EME	ESP	IMB	IJT	LDL	LDQ	MAN	OLM
Barcelona	—	0–2	0–1	0–1	0–0	4–1	1–0	1–1	1–1 (Note: The match was played at Estadio 9 de Mayo in Machala at Barcelona's request.)	0–0	1–1	4–0 (Note: The match was played at Estadio 9 de Mayo in Machala because Barcelona's home stadium was suspended for one match after the crowd threw objects on to the pitch.)
Deportivo Cuenca	1–1	—	1–1	2–2	0–1	2–1	1–1	3–1	1–2	0–2	3–2	2–1
Deportivo Quito	1–0	3–1 (Note: The match was played at Estadio La Cocha in Latacunga because Deportivo Quito's home stadium was suspended for one match after fans attempted to invade the pitch.)	—	1–1 (Note: The match was played at Estadio La Cocha in Latacunga.)	0–0	3–2	3–2	2–3	2–4	0–0	2–1	3–1
El Nacional	0–0	4–2	0–3	—	2–0	3–0	1–2	1–0	0–1	1–2	4–1	2–1
Emelec	1–1	0–0	0–0	1–1 (Note: The match was played at Estadio Reales Tamarindos in Portoviejo because Emelec's home stadium was suspended for one match after the crowd threw objects on to the pitch and hit a player from the opposing team.)	—	2–0	1–0	3–1	3–2	1–0	2–1	3–1
ESPOLI	2–3	3–1	0–3	1–1	1–2	—	2–0	3–3	1–2	0–0	0–0	1–2
Imbabura	0–2	1–2	3–2	0–1	1–1	1–0	—	2–2	3–2	1–1	0–1	3–1
Independiente José Terán	2–3	1–2	1–6	1–0	0–3	1–1	3–3	—	1–0	1–2	0–0	2–0
LDU Loja	0–0	0–0	1–0	2–1	1–4	0–0	0–2	3–2	—	1–2	3–0	1–0
LDU Quito	3–0	1–0	0–1 (Note: The match was played at Estadio Olímpico in Ibarra since Liga' home stadium was suspended for one match after fans threw objects on to the pitch.)	2–1	0–1	2–0	2–0	2–1	1–1	—	5–0	1–1
Manta	1–0	0–1	2–0	1–0	1–1	0–1	2–0	2–0	2–0	1–1	—	0–0
Olmedo	4–0	0–0	2–2	0–4	2–1	3–0	2–0	2–2	1–0	1–0	2–1	—

Legend: Blue = home team win; Yellow = draw; Red = away team win.

== Second stage ==
The second stage (Spanish: Segunda Etapa) began on July 22 and is scheduled to end on December 4.

=== Standings ===
Pos	Team	Pld	W	D	L	GF	GA	GD	Pts	Qualification
1	Deportivo Quito	22	13	5	4	34	15	+19	44	Finals, 2012 Copa Libertadores Second Stage, and 2012 Copa Sudamericana First Stage
2	Barcelona	22	12	4	6	29	21	+8	40	
3	El Nacional	22	11	4	7	40	33	+7	37	
4	Emelec	22	10	4	8	34	23	+11	34	
5	LDU Quito	22	10	4	8	32	23	+9	34	
6	Deportivo Cuenca	22	8	8	6	29	23	+6	32	
7	Independiente José Terán	22	9	4	9	32	30	+2	31	
8	Olmedo	22	7	6	9	22	28	−6	27	
9	Manta	22	7	4	11	18	30	−12	25	
10	Imbabura	22	7	4	11	26	40	−14	25	
11	LDU Loja	22	7	3	12	31	42	−11	24	
12	ESPOLI	22	4	4	14	16	35	−19	16	

Rules for classification: 1) points; 2) goal difference; 3) number of goals scored.

=== Results ===
Home \ Away	BAR	CUE	QUI	NAC	EME	ESP	IMB	IJT	LDL	LDQ	MAN	OLM
Barcelona	—	2–1	1–0	3–1	2–0	1–0	3–1	1–0	2–0	2–3	1–0	1–0
Deportivo Cuenca	0–0	—	0–1	1–1	2–0	0–0	2–1	3–0	4–0	2–1	2–0	1–1
Deportivo Quito	1–0	2–1	—	0–1	2–0	2–0	2–2	2–2	3–0	1–1	4–0	1–0
El Nacional	2–0	1–1	0–3	—	2–1	2–1	5–1	2–2	4–3	2–3	0–1	4–2
Emelec	1–1	0–0	0–0	1–1	—	4–0	5–0	2–0	4–1	2–1	1–0	3–0
ESPOLI	2–2	2–3	1–2	2–1	1–3	—	2–1	1–4	1–1	1–0	0–0	0–1
Imbabura	3–1	1–0	1–4	1–3	2–1	3–0	—	0–1	0–0	0–1	4–2	0–0
Independiente José Terán	0–3	0–1	0–1	1–2	5–0	1–0	1–1	—	3–6	2–0	3–2	3–0
LDU Loja	3–1	4–2	0–1	0–3	0–2	1–0	4–0	1–2	—	3–2	2–0	1–1
LDU Quito	0–0	4–1	1–0	2–1	1–0	1–0	1–2	1–2	3–0	—	6–0	0–0
Manta	2–0	1–1	2–0	0–1	2–1	0–1	0–1	0–0	3–1 (Note: The match was played at Estadio Monumental Banco Pichincha.)	0–0	—	2–1
Olmedo	1–2	1–1	2–2	4–1	0–3	2–1	2–1	1–0	1–0	2–0	0–1	—

Updated to match(es) played on December 4, 2011. Source:
Legend: Blue = home team win; Yellow = draw; Red = away team win.

== Aggregate table ==
Pos	Team	Pld	W	D	L	GF	GA	GD	Pts	Qualification or relegation
1	Deportivo Quito	44	24	11	9	73	40	+33	83	Qualified for the Finals
2	Emelec	44	22	12	10	65	38	+27	78	Qualified for the Finals
3	LDU Quito	44	21	11	12	61	36	+25	74	Third-Place Playoffs
4	El Nacional	44	20	9	15	71	56	+15	69	Third-Place Playoffs
5	Barcelona	44	18	13	13	51	44	+7	67	
6	Deportivo Cuenca	44	16	15	13	56	53	+3	63	
7	LDU Loja	44	16	8	20	58	69	−11	56	
8	Olmedo	44	15	11	18	49	60	−11	56	
9	Manta	44	14	10	20	38	56	−18	52	
10	Independiente José Terán	44	13	11	20	61	74	−13	50	
11	Imbabura	44	13	9	22	51	73	−22	48	Relegated to the Serie B
12	ESPOLI	44	7	10	27	38	73	−35	31	Relegated to the Serie B

Rules for classification: 1) points; 2) goal difference; 3) number of goals scored.

== Third stage ==
The Third Stage (Spanish: Tercera Etapa) began on December 11 and will end on December 19. It will consist of two playoffs.

=== Third-place playoffs ===
LDU Quito and El Nacional will play in the third-place playoff for the Ecuador 3 berth in the 2012 Copa Libertadores as the top-two teams non-stage winners in the aggregate table. Since LDU Quito had the most points in the aggregate table, they will play the second leg at home.

Pos	Team	Pld	W	D	L	GF	GA	GD	Pts	Qualification
1	El Nacional	2	1	1	0	3	2	+1	4	2012 Copa Libertadores First Stage
2	LDU Quito	2	0	1	1	2	3	−1	1	

December 11, 2011
12:00 UTC−05:00

El Nacional	2–1	LDU Quito
Vélez 8'; Chila 39'	Report	W. Calderón 23'

Estadio Olímpico Atahualpa, Quito
Attendance: 7,550
Referee: Carlos Vera

December 19, 2011
19:30 UTC−05:00

LDU Quito	1–1	El Nacional
L. Bolaños 83'	Report	J. L. Anangonó 71'

Estadio Casa Blanca, Quito
Attendance: 10,078
Referee: Omar Ponce

=== Finals ===
Emelec and Deportivo Quito qualified to the Finals by being the First Stage and Second Stage winners, respectively. The winner will be the Serie A champion and earned the Ecuador 1 berth in the 2012 Copa Libertadores. By having the greater number of points in the aggregate table, Deportivo Quito will play the second leg at home.

Pos	Team	Pld	W	D	L	GF	GA	GD	Pts
1	Deportivo Quito	2	2	0	0	2	0	+2	6
2	Emelec	2	0	0	2	0	2	−2	0

December 11, 2011
16:00 UTC−05:00

Emelec	0–1	Deportivo Quito
	Report	Martínez 29'

Estadio George Capwell, Guayaquil
Attendance: 21,635
Referee: José Caprio

December 17, 2011
12:00 UTC−05:00

Deportivo Quito	1–0	Emelec
Alustiza 88'	Report

Estadio Olímpico Atahualpa, Quito
Attendance: 32,325
Referee: Alfredo Intriago

== Top goalscorers ==
Rank	Player	Nationality	Club	Goals
1	Narciso Mina	Ecuadorian	Independiente José Terán	28
2	Juan Luis Anangonó	Ecuadorian	El Nacional	21
3	Julio Bevacqua	Argentine	Deportivo Quito	20
3	Fabio Renato	Brazilian	LDU Loja	20
5	Hernán Barcos	Argentine	LDU Quito	16
6	Christian Gómez	Ecuadorian	Olmedo	12
6	Juan Govea	Ecuadorian	Deportivo Cuenca	12
6	Edder Vaca	Ecuadorian	LDU Loja	12
9	Édison Preciado	Ecuadorian	El Nacional	11
10	Javier Guarino	Uruguayan	ESPOLI	10

Updated as of games played on December 4, 2011.

=== Hat-tricks ===
Player	For	Against	Result	Date
(Ecuador) Narciso Mina	Independiente José Terán	Deportivo Quito	2–3	May 1, 2011
(Paraguay) Fernando Giménez	Emelec	Imbabura	5–0	July 23, 2011
(Argentina) Hernán Barcos^{5}	LDU Quito	Manta	6–0	August 13, 2011
(Ecuador) Narciso Mina	Independiente José Terán	ESPOLI	1–4	November 27, 2011

- ^{5} Player scored 5 goals.
