= 2014 Campeonato Ecuatoriano de Fútbol Serie A =

Copa Pilsener Serie A
- Season: 2014
- Champions: Emelec (12th title)
- Relegated: Manta; Olmedo
- 2015 Copa Libertadores: Emelec; Barcelona; Independiente del Valle
- 2015 Copa Sudamericana: Emelec; LDU Quito; LDU Loja; Universidad Católica
- Matches: 266
- Goals: 625 (2.35 per match)
- Top goalscorer: Armando Wila (20 goals)
- Biggest home win: Independiente 6–0 Olmedo (July 6)
- Biggest away win: Deportivo Quito 0–4 El Nacional (September 26)
- Highest scoring: Universidad Católica 4–3 Independiente del Valle (February 2); Universidad Católica 2–5 Emelec (October 22)
- Longest winning run: Barcelona — 7 matches (August 17-October 1)
- Longest unbeaten run: Independiente del Valle — 20 matches (May 4-November 2)
- Longest winless run: Olmedo — 16 matches (July 13-October 19)
- Longest losing run: Deportivo Cuenca — 5 matches (February 16-March 16); Universidad Católica — 5 matches (September 14-October 5); LDU Loja — 5 matches (November 19-December 10)

The 2014 Campeonato Ecuatoriano de Fútbol de la Serie A (officially known as the Copa Pilsener Serie A for sponsorship reasons) was the 56th season of the Serie A, Ecuador's premier football league.

Emelec successfully defended their title for their 12th overall.

== Format ==
The format for the season was played as in 2013 with the exception that the runner-up would not qualify to the Copa Sudamericana.

== Teams ==
Twelve teams competed in the 2014 Serie A season, ten of which remained from the previous season. Deportivo Quevedo and Macará were relegated to the Serie B after accumulating the fewest points in the 2013 season aggregate table. They were replaced by Olmedo and Mushuc Runa, the 2013 Serie B winner and runner-up, respectively. Olmedo was making a return to the Serie A after a one-year absence. Mushuc Runa were making their first appearance in the top-flight.

Locations of the 2014 Serie A teams.

=== Stadia and locations ===
Note: Table lists in alphabetical order.

Team	Home city	Stadium	Capacity
Barcelona	Guayaquil	Monumental Isidro Romero Carbo	57,267
Deportivo Cuenca	Cuenca	Alejandro Serrano Aguilar	20,502
Deportivo Quito	Quito	Olímpico Atahualpa	35,258
El Nacional	Quito	Olímpico Atahualpa	35,258
Emelec	Guayaquil	George Capwell	21,388
Independiente del Valle	Sangolquí	Rumiñahui	7,233
LDU Loja	Loja	Federativo Reina del Cisne	13,359
LDU Quito	Quito	Casa Blanca	41,575
Manta	Manta	Jocay	17,834
Mushuc Runa	Ambato	Bellavista	16,467
Olmedo	Riobamba	Olímpico de Riobamba	14,400
Universidad Católica	Quito	Olímpico Atahualpa	35,258

=== Personnel and kits ===
Note: Flags indicate national team as has been defined under FIFA eligibility rules. Players may hold more than one non-FIFA nationality.

Team	Manager	Captain	Kit manufacturer	Shirt sponsor
Barcelona	Rubén Israel	(Ecuador) Matías Oyola	Marathon	Pilsener
Deportivo Cuenca	Guillermo Duró	(Argentina) Alejandro Frezzotti	Marathon	Metrocar
Deportivo Quito	Carlos Sevilla	(Ecuador) Edison Vega	Fila	Prima Electronics
El Nacional	Octavio Zambrano	(Ecuador) Marwin Pita	Lotto	Pilsener
Emelec	Gustavo Quinteros	(Ecuador) Pedro Quiñónez	Warrior	Pilsener
Independiente del Valle	Pablo Repetto	(Ecuador) Librado Azcona	Marathon	DirecTV
LDU Loja	Diego Ochoa	(Ecuador) Pedro Larrea	Astro	Banco de Loja
LDU Quito	Luis Zubeldía	(Ecuador) Norberto Araujo	Umbro	Budweiser
Manta	Jorge Alfonso	(Ecuador) Efrén Mera	Astro	Atún Isabel
Mushuc Runa	Julio Asad	(Argentina) Sebastián Blázquez	AESA	Cooperativa de Ahorro y Crédito Mushuc Runa
Olmedo	Juan Urquiza	(Ecuador) Robinson Sánchez	Reusch	Acción Rural
Universidad Católica	Jorge Célico	(Argentina) Facundo Martínez	Astro	Discover

=== Managerial changes ===
Team	Outgoing manager	Manner of departure	Date of vacancy	Replaced by	Date of appointment	Position in table
Pre-season changes
LDU Quito	Edgardo Bauza^{1}	Resigned	November 11, 2013	Luis Zubeldía	November 26, 2013	N/A
Olmedo	Héctor González^{2}	Replaced	December 12, 2013	Gabriel Perrone	December 12, 2013	N/A
Manta	Fabián Bustos	End of contract	December 8, 2013	Juan Manuel Llop	December 18, 2013	N/A
Deportivo Cuenca	Edgar Ospina^{2}	Replaced	December 19, 2013	Roberto Mario Gómez	December 19, 2013	N/A
First Stage changes
Deportivo Cuenca	Roberto Mario Gómez	Mutual agreement	March 2, 2014	Guillermo Duró	March 12, 2014	11th
LDU Loja	Álex Aguinaga	Mutual agreement	March 20, 2014	Diego Ochoa^{3}	March 20, 2014	3rd
Mushuc Runa	César Vigevani	Sacked	April 1, 2014	Julio Asad	April 1, 2014	11th
Barcelona	Carlos Ischia	Contract terminated	May 21, 2014	Rubén Israel	May 28, 2014	5th
Olmedo	Gabriel Perrone	Sacked	July 19, 2014	Mario Saralegui^{4}	July 31, 2014	8th
Universidad Católica	Jorge Célico	Promoted to Director of football	August 5, 2014	Luis Soler	August 5, 2014	6th
El Nacional	Carlos Sevilla	Contract terminated	August 5, 2014	Octavio Zambrano	August 11, 2014	7th
Second Stage changes
Deportivo Quito	Juan Carlos Garay	Resigned	August 9, 2014	Carlos Sevilla	August 10, 2014	7th
Manta	Juan Manuel Llop	Resigned	August 14, 2014	Armando Osma	August 15, 2014	12th
Universidad Católica	Luis Soler	Sacked	October 7, 2014	Jorge Célico^{3}	October 7, 2014	11th
Olmedo	Mario Saralegui	Resigned	October 7, 2014	Héctor González^{2}	October 7, 2014	10th
Manta	Armando Osma	Mutual agreement	October 11, 2014	Jorge Alfonso	October 11, 2014	12th
Olmedo	Héctor González^{2}	Replaced	November 16, 2014	Juan Urquiza	November 16, 2014	11th

1. Edgardo Bauza's exit was confirmed on November 11, 2013. However, he would vacate the position at the end of the 2013 season. His replacement, Luis Zubeldía, was confirmed on November 26, 2013 and would assume the managerial position upon Bauza's official exit.
2. Interim manager.
3. Interim manager, but later promoted to full-time manager.
4. Héctor González was interim manager in the 21st round.

== First stage ==
Pos	Team	Pld	W	D	L	GF	GA	GD	Pts	Qualification
1	Emelec	22	13	5	4	35	14	+21	44	Third stage and Copa Libertadores second stage
2	Independiente del Valle	22	11	7	4	36	18	+18	40	
3	LDU Loja	22	11	3	8	25	31	−6	36	
4	Barcelona	22	10	5	7	26	18	+8	35	
5	LDU Quito	22	7	8	7	20	22	−2	29	
6	Universidad Católica	22	8	4	10	26	28	−2	28	
7	El Nacional	22	8	3	11	26	35	−9	27	
8	Deportivo Quito	22	6	8	8	20	22	−2	26	
9	Olmedo	22	6	8	8	21	24	−3	26	
10	Mushuc Runa	22	7	5	10	19	24	−5	26	
11	Manta	22	6	5	11	21	29	−8	23	
12	Deportivo Cuenca	22	6	5	11	21	31	−10	23	

Updated to match(es) played on 3 August 2014. Source: Ecuafutbol

=== Results ===
Home \ Away	BAR	CUE	QUI	NAC	EME	IDV	LDL	LDQ	MAN	MUR	OLM	CAT
Barcelona		2–1	1–0	2–1	1–2	2–0	4–0	0–0	1–0	3–0	0–0	2–1
Deportivo Cuenca	0–1		0–1	1–2	1–0	1–1	0–1	0–0	3–0	3–2	1–1	2–1
Deportivo Quito	2–1	3–1		3–0	0–0	1–1	2–3	1–1	1–1	1–0	2–1	0–1
El Nacional	1–0	1–3	1–1		2–0	2–4	2–0	0–1	1–2	1–1	0–3	2–1
Emelec	2–0	3–0	2–0	5–1		0–0	3–1	3–0	4–1	1–0	0–2	2–1
Independiente del Valle	0–0	3–0	2–0	2–3	0–0		4–0	0–0	1–0	2–1	6–0	0–0
LDU Loja	1–1	2–1	1–0	2–1	1–2	1–2		1–0	1–0	1–2	1–0	1–0
LDU Quito	2–1	3–0	2–0	1–0	0–0	3–2	2–2		0–2	0–0	2–2	0–2
Manta	1–3	2–0	1–1	1–0	1–3	0–1	4–2	1–0		1–1	1–1	0–1
Mushuc Runa	0–0	1–1	1–0	0–1	1–0	0–1	0–1	1–2	2–1		1–0	1–2
Olmedo	2–1	0–1	0–0	1–1	1–1	0–1	0–1	1–0	0–0	2–3		2–0
Universidad Católica	2–0	1–1	1–1	1–3	0–2	4–3	1–1	3–1	2–1	0–1	1–2	

Updated to match(es) played on August 3, 2014. Source:
Legend: Blue = home team win; Yellow = draw; Red = away team win.

== Second stage ==
Pos	Team	Pld	W	D	L	GF	GA	GD	Pts	Qualification
1	Barcelona	22	15	3	4	33	16	+17	48	Third stage and Copa Libertadores second stage
2	Independiente del Valle	22	14	4	4	42	18	+24	46	
3	Emelec	22	14	2	6	40	22	+18	44	
4	LDU Quito	22	11	7	4	38	22	+16	40	
5	El Nacional	22	8	5	9	23	26	−3	29	
6	Universidad Católica	22	8	4	10	25	30	−5	28	
7	Deportivo Cuenca	22	7	7	8	23	29	−6	28	
8	LDU Loja	22	5	7	10	21	31	−10	22	
9	Mushuc Runa	22	4	9	9	19	30	−11	21	
10	Manta	22	5	5	12	25	35	−10	20	
11	Deportivo Quito	22	4	8	10	17	32	−15	20	
12	Olmedo	22	3	7	12	18	33	−15	16	

Updated to match(es) played on 14 December 2014. Source: Ecuafutbol

=== Results ===
Home \ Away	BAR	CUE	QUI	NAC	EME	IDV	LDL	LDQ	MAN	MUR	OLM	CAT
Barcelona		2–2	1–0	1–0	1–0	1–4	3–1	1–0	0–1	3–0	2–0	0–0
Deportivo Cuenca	0–2		0–0	2–1	2–1	0–1	1–0	1–2	1–0	1–1	3–1	1–0
Deportivo Quito	1–3	0–0		0–4	2–2	3–0	3–2	2–3	1–1	1–1	2–0	1–0
El Nacional	1–4	2–1	0–0		0–1	0–1	1–1	0–0	2–1	1–0	2–1	1–1
Emelec	0–1	3–0	3–0	5–0		1–0	3–1	0–1	2–1	3–1	1–0	2–1
Independiente del Valle	2–1	4–0	2–0	0–1	5–0		1–1	3–1	4–0	1–0	1–1	4–0
LDU Loja	0–1	1–1	4–0	1–0	0–2	0–0		1–0	2–0	2–1	0–3	1–2
LDU Quito	0–0	1–1	3–0	2–1	2–1	2–0	1–1		2–0	5–1	5–1	1–2
Manta	2–4	2–1	1–1	2–1	1–3	2–3	3–0	3–3		3–0	0–0	1–1
Mushuc Runa	2–0	1–2	0–0	1–1	0–1	1–1	1–1	1–1	1–0		1–1	2–0
Olmedo	0–1	2–2	1–0	1–2	1–1	2–3	0–0	1–1	1–0	1–2		0–3
Universidad Católica	0–1	2–1	1–0	0–2	2–5	1–2	4–1	1–2	2–1	1–1	1–0	

Updated to match(es) played on December 14, 2014. Source:
Legend: Blue = home team win; Yellow = draw; Red = away team win.

== Aggregate table ==
Pos	Team	Pld	W	D	L	GF	GA	GD	Pts	Qualification or relegation
1	Emelec	44	27	7	10	75	36	+39	88	Copa Libertadores second stage and Copa Sudamericana first stage (Note: Qualified as Third stage winner)
2	Independiente del Valle	44	25	11	8	78	36	+42	86	Copa Libertadores first stage
3	Barcelona	44	25	8	11	59	34	+25	83	Copa Libertadores second stage (Note: Qualified as Second stage winner)
4	LDU Quito	44	18	15	11	58	44	+14	69	Copa Sudamericana first stage
5	LDU Loja	44	16	10	18	48	62	−14	58	Copa Sudamericana first stage
6	Universidad Católica	44	16	8	20	51	58	−7	56	Copa Sudamericana first stage
7	El Nacional	44	16	8	20	49	61	−12	56	
8	Deportivo Cuenca	44	13	12	19	44	60	−16	51	
9	Mushuc Runa	44	11	14	19	38	54	−16	47	
10	Deportivo Quito	44	10	16	18	37	54	−17	46	
11	Manta	44	11	10	23	46	64	−18	43	2015 Serie B
12	Olmedo	44	9	15	20	39	57	−18	42	2015 Serie B

Updated to match(es) played on 14 December 2014. Source: Ecuafutbol

== Third stage ==
Emelec and Barcelona qualified to the Finals (Third Stage) by being the First Stage and Second Stage winners, respectively. The winner will be the Serie A champion and earn the Ecuador 1 berth in the 2015 Copa Libertadores and in the 2015 Copa Sudamericana, and the loser will be the Serie A runner-up and earn the Ecuador 2 berth in the 2015 Copa Libertadores. By having the greater number of points in the aggregate table, Emelec will play the second leg at home.

December 17, 2014
20:00 UTC−05:00

Barcelona	1–1	Emelec
Blanco 88'	Report	Mena 19'

Estadio Monumental Isidro Romero Carbo, Guayaquil
Attendance: 63,686
Referee: Omar Ponce

December 21, 2014
16:30 UTC−05:00

Emelec	3–0	Barcelona
Mena 22'; M. Bolaños 81', 87'	Report

Estadio George Capwell, Guayaquil
Attendance: 23,459
Referee: Carlos Vera

Emelec won 4–1 on aggregate.

Campeonato Ecuatoriano de Fútbol
2014 Serie A champion

12th title

== Top goalscorers ==
Rank	Player	Nationality	Club	Goals
1	Armando Wila	ECU	Universidad Católica	20
2	Miller Bolaños	ECU	Emelec	19
3	Junior Sornoza	ECU	Independiente del Valle	17
4	Daniel Angulo	ECU	Independiente del Valle	16
5	Juan Manuel Cobelli	ARG	Deportivo Cuenca	14
5	Angel Mena	ECU	Emelec	14
7	Maximiliano Barreiro	ARG	Mushuc Runa	13
8	Ismael Blanco	ARG	Barcelona	12
8	Henry Patta	ECU	Universidad Católica	12
10	Juan Luis Anangonó	ECU	LDU Quito	11
10	Miller Castillo	ECU	Manta	11
