= 2017 Ecuadorian Serie A =

Copa Banco del Pacífico Serie A
- Season: 2017
- Dates: 29 January – 17 December 2017
- Champions: Emelec (14th title)
- Relegated: Clan Juvenil; Fuerza Amarilla
- Copa Libertadores: Emelec; Delfín; Independiente del Valle; Macará
- Copa Sudamericana: Barcelona; El Nacional; Deportivo Cuenca; LDU Quito
- Matches: 266
- Goals: 693 (2.61 per match)
- Top goalscorer: Hernán Barcos (21 goals)
- Biggest home win: Macará 7–1 Clan Juvenil (18 August); El Nacional 6–0 Fuerza Amarilla (24 September); Independiente del Valle 6–0 Fuerza Amarilla (22 October)
- Biggest away win: Fuerza Amarilla 0–3 Barcelona (28 April); Macará 0–3 Universidad Católica (30 April); Universidad Católica 0–3 Independiente del Valle (15 July); Guayaquil City 0–3 Macará (23 September); LDU Quito 0–3 El Nacional (4 November); Fuerza Amarilla 0–3 Emelec (11 November)
- Highest scoring: Clan Juvenil 6–3 Universidad Católica (25 August); LDU Quito 6–3 Clan Juvenil (8 December)

The 2017 Campeonato Ecuatoriano de Fútbol Serie A (officially known as the Copa Banco del Pacífico Serie A for sponsorship reasons) was the 59th season of the Serie A.

== Teams ==
Twelve teams competed in the 2017 Serie A season, ten of whom took part in the previous season. Aucas and Mushuc Runa were relegated from the Serie A after accumulating the fewest points during the 2016 season. They were replaced by Macará and Clan Juvenil, the 2016 Serie B winner and runner-up, respectively. Macará made their 31st top-flight appearance and their first return to the Serie A since 2013, while Clan Juvenil participated in their first top-flight appearance.

=== Stadia and locations ===
Locations of the 2017 Serie A teams.

Note: Table lists in alphabetical order.

Team	Home city	Stadium	Capacity
Barcelona	Guayaquil	Monumental Banco Pichincha	57,267
Clan Juvenil	Sangolquí	Rumiñahui	7,233
Delfín	Manta	Jocay	17,834
Deportivo Cuenca	Cuenca	Banco del Austro Alejandro Serrano Aguilar	18,549
El Nacional	Quito	Olímpico Atahualpa	35,258
Emelec	Guayaquil	Banco del Pacífico Capwell	38,963
Fuerza Amarilla	Machala	9 de Mayo	16,456
Guayaquil City^{a}	Guayaquil	Christian Benítez Betancourt	10,152
Independiente del Valle	Sangolquí	Rumiñahui	7,233
LDU Quito	Quito	Rodrigo Paz Delgado	41,575
Macará	Ambato	Bellavista	16,467
Universidad Católica	Quito	Olímpico Atahualpa	35,258

a: Known as River Ecuador until the end of the first stage.

=== Personnel and kits ===
Team	Manager	Kit manufacturer	Shirt sponsor
Barcelona	(Uruguay) Guillermo Almada	Marathon	Pilsener
Clan Juvenil	(Argentina) Julio Asad	Aurik	Juan Cevallos Accesorios Petroleros; Carli Snacks
Delfín	(Uruguay) Guillermo Sanguinetti	Spyro	Frescodegfer; La Esquina de Ales
Deportivo Cuenca	(Argentina) Gabriel Schürrer	Joma	Chubb Seguros
El Nacional	(Uruguay) Eduardo Favaro	Lotto	ANDEC
Emelec	(Uruguay) Alfredo Arias	Adidas	Pilsener
Fuerza Amarilla	(Brazil) Alcides de Oliveira (caretaker)	Boman	No sponsor
Guayaquil City	(Ecuador) Pool Gavilánez (caretaker)	Astro	DirecTV
Independiente del Valle	(Colombia) Alexis Mendoza	Marathon	Chevrolet; DirecTV
LDU Quito	(Uruguay) Pablo Repetto	Umbro	Chevrolet
Macará	(Ecuador) Paúl Vélez	Boman	Cooperativa San Francisco Ltda.
Universidad Católica	(Colombia) Santiago Escobar	Astro	Discover Card

=== Managerial changes ===
Team	Outgoing manager	Manner of departure	Date of vacancy	Position in table	Incoming manager	Date of appointment
First stage
Fuerza Amarilla	(Ecuador) Ángel Gracia	Resigned	3 March	6th	(Uruguay) Marcelo Fleitas	6 March
Clan Juvenil	(Ecuador) Juan Carlos Garay	Resigned	12 March	10th	(Ecuador) Carlos Sevilla	12 March
River Ecuador	(Spain) Ángel Gómez	Sacked	28 March	12th	(Argentina) Gabriel Perrone	30 March
Clan Juvenil	(Ecuador) Carlos Sevilla	Resigned	28 March	12th	(Argentina) Julio Asad	29 May
LDU Quito	(Uruguay) Gustavo Munúa	Sacked	3 July	11th	(Uruguay) Pablo Repetto	5 July
Second stage
Fuerza Amarilla	(Uruguay) Marcelo Fleitas	Sacked	18 July	9th	(Argentina) Reinaldo Merlo	18 July
Universidad Católica	(Argentina) Jorge Célico	Signed by FEF	18 July	12th	(Uruguay) Gustavo Díaz	21 July
Fuerza Amarilla	(Argentina) Reinaldo Merlo	Sacked	15 August	12th	(Brazil) Alcides de Oliveira	16 August
Universidad Católica	(Uruguay) Gustavo Díaz	Signed by León	28 August	12th	(Argentina) Marcelo Romano	28 August
Guayaquil City	(Argentina) Gabriel Perrone	Sacked	11 September	12th	(Ecuador) Pool Gavilánez	11 September
Universidad Católica	(Argentina) Marcelo Romano	End of caretaker tenure	1 November	12th	(Colombia) Santiago Escobar	1 November

== First stage ==
The first stage began on January 29 and ended on July 9.

Pos	Team	Pld	W	D	L	GF	GA	GD	Pts	Qualification
1	Delfín	22	13	8	1	35	14	+21	47	Qualification to Third stage and Copa Libertadores group stage
2	Emelec	22	9	11	2	32	21	+11	38	
3	Independiente del Valle	22	10	7	5	27	19	+8	37	
4	Barcelona (Note: Barcelona were deducted six points as punishment for an unpaid debt to Boca Juniors regarding the transfer of Damián Díaz.)	22	12	5	5	36	21	+15	35	
5	Macará	22	9	6	7	29	30	−1	33	
6	Deportivo Cuenca	22	7	8	7	24	23	+1	29	
7	Universidad Católica	22	7	7	8	33	26	+7	28	
8	River Ecuador	22	6	8	8	20	25	−5	26	
9	El Nacional	22	5	8	9	27	36	−9	23	
10	LDU Quito	22	3	10	9	25	32	−7	19	
11	Fuerza Amarilla	22	2	10	10	17	31	−14	16	
12	Clan Juvenil	22	2	6	14	19	46	−27	12	

Source: FEF, Soccerway
Rules for classification: 1) Points, 2) Goal difference, 3) Goals for, 4) Away goals for, 5) Goals against, 6) Head-to-head record, 7) Penalty shootout.
If a penalty shootout is not possible: 7) Drawing of lots or playoff game

=== Results ===
Home \ Away	BAR	CJU	DEL	CUE	NAC	EME	FAM	IDV	LDQ	MAC	RIV	CAT
Barcelona	—	4–1	1–2	1–0	3–2	2–1	2–0	2–1	3–1	1–1	2–0	1–3
Clan Juvenil	1–1	—	0–1	2–0	3–4	2–2	1–1	0–2	0–0	0–2	2–1	0–1
Delfín	1–0	1–0	—	1–0	3–0	3–3	5–1	2–1	4–1	1–0	0–0	3–1
Deportivo Cuenca	1–1	2–0	1–1	—	3–1	2–2	1–0	2–0	2–0	1–3	2–1	2–2
El Nacional	1–3	3–1	0–0	0–0	—	0–2	4–2	0–2	1–1	2–0	2–2	1–1
Emelec	1–0	2–0	1–1	2–1	0–0	—	1–0	1–1	2–0	2–0	1–0	2–2
Fuerza Amarilla	0–3	1–1	1–1	0–0	3–0	0–1	—	1–2	1–1	1–1	0–2	3–1
Independiente del Valle	0–2	4–1	1–1	1–0	0–2	1–1	2–0	—	2–1	1–0	0–0	1–0
LDU Quito	1–1	5–0	0–2	1–1	2–2	1–1	1–1	1–1	—	2–3	4–0	1–0
Macará	2–1	2–2	1–2	2–2	1–0	4–3	0–0	1–1	1–0	—	2–1	0–3
River Ecuador	0–0	2–1	1–0	2–0	3–1	0–0	1–1	0–0	1–1	3–0	—	0–2
Universidad Católica	1–2	5–1	0–0	0–1	1–1	1–1	0–0	1–3	3–0	1–3	4–0	—

Source: FEF, Soccerway
Legend: Blue = home team win; Yellow = draw; Red = away team win.

== Second stage ==
The second stage began on July 14 and concluded on December 9.

Pos	Team	Pld	W	D	L	GF	GA	GD	Pts	Qualification
1	Emelec	22	14	3	5	39	20	+19	45	Qualification to Third stage and Copa Libertadores group stage
2	El Nacional	22	12	5	5	46	26	+20	41	
3	Macará	22	10	7	5	28	17	+11	37	
4	Delfín	22	9	10	3	30	20	+10	37	
5	LDU Quito	22	10	5	7	41	32	+9	35	
6	Independiente del Valle	22	9	7	6	41	30	+11	34	
7	Barcelona	22	8	8	6	26	20	+6	32	
8	Deportivo Cuenca	22	9	5	8	27	26	+1	32	
9	Guayaquil City	22	4	7	11	15	31	−16	19	
10	Universidad Católica	22	5	2	15	23	41	−18	17	
11	Clan Juvenil	22	4	5	13	31	56	−25	17	
12	Fuerza Amarilla (Note: Fuerza Amarilla were deducted five points as punishment for failing to submit its payrolls.)	22	5	2	15	17	45	−28	12	

Source: FEF, Soccerway
Rules for classification: 1) Points, 2) Goal difference, 3) Goals for, 4) Away goals for, 5) Goals against, 6) Head-to-head record, 7) Penalty shootout.
If a penalty shootout is not possible: 7) Drawing of lots or playoff game

=== Results ===
Home \ Away	BAR	CJU	DEL	CUE	NAC	EME	FAM	GUA	IDV	LDQ	MAC	CAT
Barcelona	—	2–1	1–1	3–0	1–2	0–0	2–0	0–0	1–1	2–0	0–1	0–1
Clan Juvenil	0–2	—	3–3	2–2	2–2	1–2	1–0	4–1	2–4	0–0	1–0	6–3
Delfín	1–1	3–0	—	0–0	2–1	2–1	3–0	2–0	2–0	1–0	1–1	2–0
Deportivo Cuenca	1–0	3–0	1–1	—	1–2	0–2	2–1	3–0	1–0	1–3	0–1	3–1
El Nacional	3–3	4–0	1–0	0–1	—	3–1	6–0	1–0	1–1	4–2	1–0	3–1
Emelec	3–0	5–1	0–0	1–0	2–1	—	2–0	2–0	2–1	2–1	2–1	2–0
Fuerza Amarilla	0–2	3–2	1–2	2–0	1–0	0–3	—	0–3 (Note: Match awarded 3–0 to Guayaquil City due to Fuerza Amarilla being sanctioned by FEF.)	1–2	1–1	2–2	2–0
Guayaquil City	1–2	0–0	0–0	0–1	2–2	1–1	0–2	—	1–2	1–0	0–3	2–1
Independiente del Valle	2–2	2–1	2–2	2–3	2–2	2–1	6–0	4–1	—	1–3	1–1	2–0
LDU Quito	0–0	6–3	5–2	2–1	0–3	2–4	3–1	1–1	3–1	—	2–0	3–0
Macará	1–0	7–1	0–0	1–1	3–2	1–0	1–0	0–1	0–0	1–1	—	2–1
Universidad Católica	1–2	2–0	2–0	2–2	1–2	3–1	2–0	0–0	0–3	2–3	0–1	—

Source: FEF, Soccerway
Legend: Blue = home team win; Yellow = draw; Red = away team win.

== Third stage ==
Delfín and Emelec qualified to the Finals (Third stage) by being the First stage and Second stage winners, respectively. The winners were the Serie A champions and earned the Ecuador 1 berth in the 2018 Copa Libertadores, and the losers were the Serie A runners-up and earned the Ecuador 2 berth in the 2018 Copa Libertadores. By having the greater number of points in the aggregate table, Delfín played the second leg at home.

13 December 2017
20:00 UTC–5

Emelec	4–2	Delfín
Guagua 10'; Gaibor 45'; Preciado 71'; Angulo 78'	Report	Luna 69', 90+3'

Estadio George Capwell, Guayaquil
Referee: Roddy Zambrano

17 December 2017
12:00 UTC–5

Delfín	0–2	Emelec
	Report	Preciado 45'; Angulo 64'

Estadio Jocay, Manta
Referee: Omar Ponce

Emelec won 6–2 on aggregate.

Campeonato Ecuatoriano de Fútbol
2017 Serie A champions

14th title

== Aggregate table ==
Pos	Team	Pld	W	D	L	GF	GA	GD	Pts	Qualification
1	Delfín	44	22	18	4	65	34	+31	84	Qualification to Copa Libertadores group stage
2	Emelec (C)	44	23	14	7	71	41	+30	83	Qualification to Copa Libertadores group stage
3	Independiente del Valle	44	19	14	11	68	49	+19	71	Qualification to Copa Libertadores second stage
4	Macará	44	19	13	12	57	47	+10	70	Qualification to Copa Libertadores first stage
5	Barcelona (Note: Barcelona were deducted six points as punishment for an unpaid debt to Boca Juniors regarding the transfer of Damián Díaz.)	44	20	13	11	62	41	+21	67	Qualification to Copa Sudamericana first stage
6	El Nacional	44	17	13	14	73	62	+11	64	Qualification to Copa Sudamericana first stage
7	Deportivo Cuenca	44	16	13	15	51	49	+2	61	Qualification to Copa Sudamericana first stage
8	LDU Quito	44	13	15	16	66	64	+2	54	Qualification to Copa Sudamericana playoff
9	Universidad Católica	44	12	9	23	56	67	−11	45	
10	Guayaquil City	44	10	15	19	35	56	−21	45	
11	Clan Juvenil (R)	44	6	11	27	50	102	−52	29	Relegation to Serie B
12	Fuerza Amarilla (Note: Fuerza Amarilla were deducted five points as punishment for failing to submit its payrolls.) (R)	44	7	12	25	34	76	−42	28	Relegation to Serie B

Source: FEF
Rules for classification: 1) Points, 2) Goal difference, 3) Goals for, 4) Away goals for, 5) Goals against, 6) Head-to-head record, 7) Penalty shootout.
If a penalty shootout is not possible: 7) Drawing of lots or playoff game
(C) Champions; (R) Relegated

== Copa Sudamericana playoff ==
The Copa Sudamericana playoff was played between:

- LDU Quito (Aggregate table 4th best team not qualified for 2018 Copa Libertadores)
- Técnico Universitario (2017 Serie B champions)

The winners qualified for the 2018 Copa Sudamericana first stage.

13 December 2017
20:00 UTC–5

Técnico Universitario	1–2	LDU Quito
Armas 35' (pen.)	Report	Barcos 90'; Salaberry 90+3'

Estadio Bellavista, Ambato
Referee: Carlos Orbe

17 December 2017
11:30 UTC–5

LDU Quito	3–3	Técnico Universitario
Cevallos 13', 51'; Barcos 17'	Report	Fábio Renato 60', 69', 76'

Estadio Rodrigo Paz Delgado, Quito
Referee: Luis Quiroz

LDU Quito won 5–4 on aggregate.

== Top goalscorers ==
Rank	Name	Club	Goals
1	(Argentina) Hernán Barcos	LDU Quito	21
2	(Uruguay) Jonathan Álvez	Barcelona	20
3	(Argentina) Juan Dinenno	Deportivo Cuenca	19
3	(Ecuador) Carlos Garcés	Delfín	19
5	(Argentina) Juan Manuel Tévez	Macará	17
6	(Ecuador) Jhon Cifuente	Universidad Católica	15
6	(Ecuador) Michael Estrada	Independiente del Valle	15
8	(Ecuador) Bryan de Jesús	El Nacional	14
8	(Ecuador) Ayrton Preciado	Emelec	14
10	(Ecuador) Roberto Ordóñez	Delfín	13

Source: FEF
