= S.D. Aucas =

Ecuadorian football club

Aucas
- Full name: Sociedad Deportiva Aucas
- Nicknames: Ídolo de Quito (The Idol of Quito); Ídolo del Pueblo (The Idol of the People); Papá Aucas; Equipo Oriental
- Founded: 6 February 1945; 81 years ago
- Ground: Estadio Gonzalo Pozo Ripalda; Quito, Ecuador
- Capacity: 18,799
- Chairman: Danny Walker
- Manager: Norberto Araujo
- League: Ecuadorian Serie A
- 2025: First stage: 9th of 16; Second hexagonal: 3rd of 6
- Website: www.aucas.ec
Home colours	Away colours	Third colours

Sociedad Deportiva Aucas (Spanish pronunciation: [sosjeˈðað ðepoɾˈtiβa ˈawkas]), also known as "Papá Aucas", is a football club based in Quito, Ecuador. They play in the top tier of Ecuadorian football and have spent the majority of their history in the top-flight Serie A. The team is amongst the most popular in the city because of its long history in the Serie A. The team also has a major rivalry in L.D.U. Quito, which they contest one of the most prestigious derbies in all of Ecuador, and the most prestigious in Quito.

In December 2025, Red&Gold Football, a joint venture between German Bundesliga club Bayern Munich and American Major League Soccer (MLS) club Los Angeles FC, became partners with the club, forming a long-term commitment in order to identify and develop elite talent across the continent.

== Overview ==
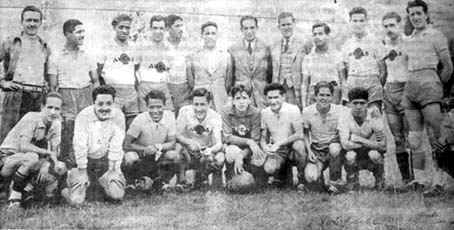
Aucas' 1945 Campeonato Amateur del Fútbol de Pichincha winning squad

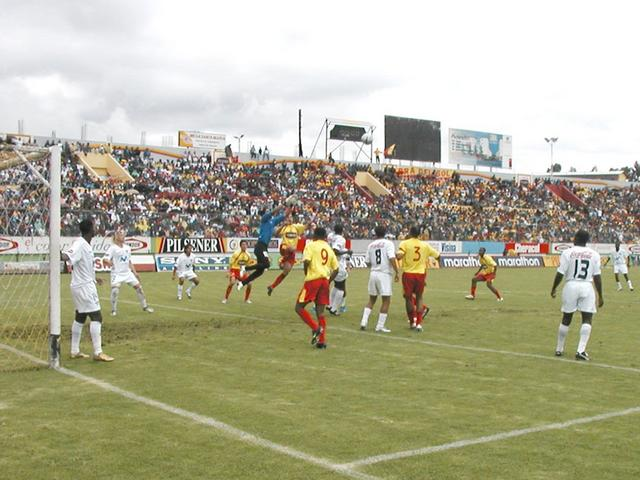
Superclásico in Quito, 2005

The team is named after the Auca tribe, who are also called Huaorani. The club originally belonged to Royal Dutch Shell, which had been operating oil fields in the east of Ecuador where the Aucas live. The club's main uniforms colours, yellow and red, were taken from the colours used by Shell to market their products and services. The alternate uniform is grey, except for the commercial advertisements and numbers and names of players, which are red.

Players who have played for Aucas include Argentinian and nationalised Ecuadorian forward Ariel Graziani, forward Nicolás Asencio, forward Agustin Delgado, forward Édison Maldonado, Ecuador international defender Giovanny Espinoza, and the 1990 FIFA World Cup Colombian goalkeeper René Higuita.

Aucas won their first Serie A title in 2022 under the tenure of Venezuelan manager César Farías by winning the competition's second stage without losing a single game and then beating Barcelona in the finals. This win also qualified them to the 2023 Copa Libertadores, the first time they competed in the continental tournament.

== Honours ==
=== National ===
- Serie A
  - Winners (1): 2022
- Serie B
  - Winners (3): 1974 E2, 1991 E2, 2014
- Segunda Categoría
  - Winners (2): 1986 E2, 2012

=== Regional ===
- Campeonato Amateur del Fútbol de Pichincha
  - Winners (6): 1945, 1946, 1947, 1948, 1949, 1951
- Campeonato Professional Interandino
  - Winners (2): 1959, 1962
- Segunda Categoría de Pichincha
  - Winners (7): 1971, 1972, 1985, 1986, 2010, 2011, 2012

== Performance in CONMEBOL competitions ==
- Copa Libertadores: 2 appearances

2023: Group Stage
2024: First Qualifying Stage

- Copa Sudamericana: 6 appearances

2002: First Round
2004: Second Round
2016: First Round
2020: First Round
2021: Group Stage
2025: First Round

== Players ==
=== Current squad ===
As of 11 April 2026

Note: Flags indicate national team as defined under FIFA eligibility rules; some limited exceptions apply. Players may hold more than one non-FIFA nationality.

No.	Pos.	Nation	Player
1	GK	ARG	Iván Chaves (on loan from Patronato)
2	DF	ARG	Santiago Morales (on loan from Atlético Sarmiento)
3	DF	ECU	John Ontaneda
5	MF	ECU	Thiago Serpa
6	MF	ARG	Agostino Spina (on loan from Huracán)
7	FW	BOL	Bruno Miranda
10	FW	ECU	Ayrton Preciado
11	MF	ECU	Romario Bolaños
12	GK	ECU	Jefferson Cabezas
13	GK	ECU	Hamilton Piedra
14	MF	COL	Stiven Tapiero
16	DF	ECU	Luis Gustavino
18	MF	ECU	Andrés Mena

No.	Pos.	Nation	Player
19	DF	ECU	Carlos Cuero
21	MF	ECU	Piero Guzman
28	MF	ECU	Ederson Quiñónez
29	FW	ECU	Luis Arroyo
31	DF	ECU	Byron Carabali
33	FW	ECU	Snayder Porozo
34	MF	ECU	Michael Carcelén (on loan from Querétaro)
37	DF	ECU	Alex Zova
55	DF	ECU	Virgilio Olaya
57	FW	ECU	Maverick Vera
89	FW	ARG	Alexander Sosa
91	MF	ECU	Danny Luna
99	FW	DOM	Erick Japa

=== Out on loan ===
Note: Flags indicate national team as defined under FIFA eligibility rules; some limited exceptions apply. Players may hold more than one non-FIFA nationality.

No.	Pos.	Nation	Player
—	MF	ECU	Diego Espinoza (on loan to Deportivo Quito)
—	FW	ECU	Edison Gruezo (on loan to Querétaro)

No.	Pos.	Nation	Player
—	FW	ECU	Cristhoper Zambrano (on loan to Al Taawoun)

=== World Cup players ===
The following players were chosen to represent their country at the FIFA World Cup while contracted to Aucas.

- (Ecuador) Giovanny Espinoza (2002)
- (Ecuador) Damián Enrique Lanza (2006)
- (Ecuador) Hernán Galíndez (2022)

== Former presidents ==
Name	Years
(Netherlands) Federico Hulswit	1945-1950
(Ecuador) Guillermo Alarcón	1951
(Ecuador) Cristóbal Cornejo	1952
(Ecuador) Gabriela Landeta	1953
(Ecuador) Francisco López Campana	1954
(Ecuador) Agustín Arias	1955
(Ecuador) Héctor Álvarez	1955
(Ecuador) Félix Vega	1956
(Ecuador) Eduardo Moreano	1956-1957
(Ecuador) Bolívar Pico	1958
(Ecuador) Víctor Cortez	1959
(Ecuador) Astor Fabián Vizcaíno	1959
(Ecuador) Eduardo Pérez	1960
(Ecuador) Astor Fabián Vizcaíno	1961-1964
(Ecuador) Conto Patiño Martínez	1965
(Ecuador) Astor Fabián Vizcaíno	1966-1967
(Ecuador) Jaime Wandeberg	1968
(Ecuador) José Zúñiga Villalobos	1969
(Ecuador) Jorge Wohlgemuth	1970
(Ecuador) Hernán Chiriboga	1971
(Ecuador) Gustavo Herdoíza León	1971-1972
(Ecuador) Marco Tulio Cordero	1973-1974
(Ecuador) Mario Ferri	1974
(Ecuador) Gustavo Herdoíza León	1975-1976
(Ecuador) Enrique Zaldumbide	1977-1978
(Ecuador) Luis Rosanía Dávila	1979-1980
(Ecuador) Lenín Rosero	1981-1982
(Ecuador) Jaime Del Castillo Bedach	1983
(Ecuador) Diego Del Castillo Dedach	1983
(Ecuador) Guillermo Herrera	1984
(Ecuador) Jaime Bowen	1984-1989
(Ecuador) Guillermo Herrera	1990
(Ecuador) Humberto Rodríguez Ortiz	1991-1992
(Ecuador) Alberto Ayala	1993
(Ecuador) Ramiro Montenegro López	1994-2004
(Ecuador) Fernando Hinojosa	2005-2007
(Ecuador) Ramiro Montenegro López	2008-2009
(Ecuador) Luis Alonso Moreno	2009-2010
(Ecuador) Alberto Ayala	2010-2012
(Ecuador) Ramiro Gordón	2012-2013
(Ecuador) Mónica Gordón	2013
(Ecuador) Rodrigo Espinoza	2013-2014
(Ecuador) Ximena Moreta	2014-2016
(Ecuador) Darwin Romero	2016-2018
(Ecuador) Danny Walker	2018-present

== Managers ==
- (Ecuador) Ernesto Guerra (1975, 1986–1987, 1989)
- (Ecuador) Carlos Cuvi (1995)
- (Ecuador) Polo Carrera (1995)
- (Colombia) Leonel Montoya (1996)
- (Ecuador) Alfredo Encalada (1994, 1996)
- (Ecuador) Homero Mistral Valencia (1995, 1996–1997)
- (Uruguay) Juan Ramón Silva (1998–1999)
- (Bolivia) Ramiro Blacut (1999–2000)
- (Uruguay) Gerardo Pelusso (2001–2002)
- (Argentina) Salvador Raguza (2002)
- (Uruguay) Adan Machado (2002)
- (Ecuador) Carlos Sevilla (2003)
- (Colombia) Luis Fernando Suárez (2003–2004)
- (Colombia) Javier Álvarez Arteaga (2004–2005)
- (Serbia) Dragan Miranović (2005–2006)
- (Uruguay) Diego Aguirre (2006)
- (Ecuador) Fausto Carrera (2006)
- (Argentina) Juan Amador Sánchez (2006–2007)
- (Uruguay) Fernando Rodriguez Riolfo (2007)
- (Uruguay) Carlos Berrueta (2007)
- (Argentina) Miguel Ángel Zahzú (2008)
- (Ecuador) Carlos Calderón (2008)
- (Bolivia) Marco Etcheverry (2009)
- (Ecuador) Polo Carrera (2009)
- (Ecuador) Alfredo Encalada (2011–2012)
- (Argentina) Julio Asad (2012–2013)
- (Uruguay) Juan Ramón Silva (2014)
- (Argentina) Carlos Ischia (2015–2016)
- (Uruguay) Tabaré Silva (2016)
- (Colombia) Armando Osma (2009, 2016–2017)
- (Argentina) Darío Tempesta (2017, 2020–2021)
- (Argentina) Luis Soler (2018)
- (Uruguay) Eduardo Favaro (2019)
- (Argentina) Gabriel Schürrer (2019)
- (Argentina) Héctor Bidoglio (2021)
- (Venezuela) César Farías (2022–2023)
- (Colombia) Santiago Escobar (2023)
- (Mexico) Gerardo Espinoza (2024)
- (Argentina) Jorge Alfonso (2024)
