= Carlos Quiñónez =

Carlos Quiñónez may refer to:

- Carlos Quiñónez (footballer, born 1977), Guatemalan football midfielder
- Carlos Quiñónez (footballer, born 1980), Ecuadoran football wingback
