= Juan Urquiza =

Argentine footballer and manager

Personal information
- Full name: Juan Alberto Urquiza
- Date of birth: 5 February 1959 (age 67)
- Place of birth: Marcos Juárez, Argentina

Youth career
- Years: Team
- Argentinos Juniors

Managerial career
- Renato Cesarini (youth)
- 2002: Argentinos Juniors (assistant)
- 2003: Barcelona SC (assistant)
- 2003: Almagro (assistant)
- 2004: Barcelona SC
- 2005: Almagro (assistant)
- 2005–2006: Tiro Federal (assistant)
- 2006–2007: LDU Portoviejo
- 2007: Macará
- 2008: Emelec
- 2010: Técnico Universitario
- 2013: Deportivo Quevedo
- 2014: Olmedo
- 2015: Clan Juvenil
- 2016: LDU Portoviejo
- 2022: Técnico Universitario

Juan Alberto Urquiza (born 5 February 1959) is an Argentine football manager.

== Career ==
Born in Marcos Juárez, Córdoba Province, Urquiza played youth football with Argentinos Juniors, but retired at early age, and moved to coaching with Renato Cesarini's youth categories. He moved to Ecuador in 2003, as Jorge Solari's assistant at Barcelona SC.

In September 2004, Urquiza was appointed manager of Barcelona after Solari resigned for personal reasons. He left the post in November, and subsequently rejoined Solari's staff back in his home country.

In 2006, Urquiza returned to Ecuador after being named manager of LDU Portoviejo. He left the club in August 2007 to take over Macará, and managed to avoid relegation with the club.

On 14 December 2007, Urquiza was named manager of Emelec, but was dismissed the following 15 April. He then spent more than a year without coaching before taking over Técnico Universitario in January 2010; in April, he was replaced by Renato Salas.

On 23 July 2013, Urquiza was appointed in charge of Deportivo Quevedo, but resigned on 25 September. He became the new manager of Olmedo on 16 November 2014, but was unable to avoid a top tier relegation.

Urquiza led Clan Juvenil to the Serie B in the 2015 season, and returned to LDU Portoviejo in March 2016. He resigned in May, and subsequently solely worked for the Ecuadorian Football Federation as a mediator.

On 9 May 2022, after nearly six years without managing, Urquiza returned to Técnico Universitario, but left after just one month after rescinding his contract.
