= Guillermo Duró =

Argentine football manager

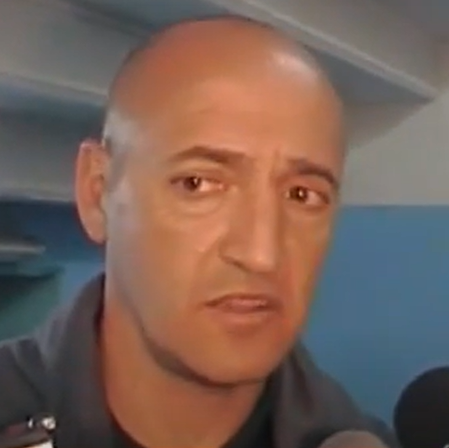
- Duró in 2011

Personal information
- Full name: Guillermo Andrés Duró
- Date of birth: 16 November 1968 (age 57)
- Place of birth: Villa Ballester, Argentina
- Position: Defender

Senior career*
Years	Team	Apps	(Gls)
- San Miguel
- Ituzaingó
- Almirante Brown
- Aldosivi

Managerial career
- 2000–2002: Defensores de Belgrano
- 2003: Platense
- 2004: Deportivo Cuenca (assistant)
- 2005: All Boys
- 2006: Flandria
- 2007–2008: Tristán Suárez
- 2008–2009: Deportivo Cuenca
- 2010: Independiente DV
- 2011: Temperley
- 2012: Defensores de Belgrano
- 2012: Deportivo Cuenca
- 2013–2014: Libertad Sunchales
- 2014: Deportivo Cuenca
- 2016: Estudiantes BA
- 2017: Atlanta
- 2018–2020: Deportivo Riestra
- 2020–2021: Deportivo Cuenca
- 2021–2022: Deportivo Riestra
- 2022–2024: Delfín
- 2024–2025: Deportivo Garcilaso
- 2025–2026: Emelec
- 2026: Deportivo Riestra
- * Club domestic league appearances and goals

Guillermo Andrés Duró (born 16 November 1968) is an Argentine football manager and former player who played as a defender.

== Career ==
Born in Villa Ballester, Duró represented San Miguel, Ituzaingó, Almirante Brown and Aldosivi as a player. He began his managerial career in 2000, with Defensores de Belgrano.

After leaving Defensores in 2002, Duró subsequently worked with Platense before joining Julio Asad's staff at Deportivo Cuenca, as his assistant. He returned to Argentina in 2005 with All Boys, and subsequently worked at Flandria and Tristán Suárez before moving back to Deportivo Cuenca in November 2008, now as manager.

Duró left Cuenca in December 2009 after his contract expired, and was named in charge of Independiente del Valle in May 2010. He was sacked after nearly four months in charge, and subsequently returned to Argentina to take over Temperley in June 2011.

Duró returned to Defensores de Belgrano in February 2012, but left on 25 October to return to Deportivo Cuenca. He returned to Tristán Suárez as a football coordinator in June 2013, and after a short spell at Libertad de Sunchales, he returned to Deportivo Cuenca on 13 March 2014.

On 8 March 2016, Duró was appointed at the helm of Estudiantes de Buenos Aires. He was subsequently in charge of Atlanta and Deportivo Riestra before returning to Cuenca for a fourth spell, initially as an interim.

After working at Cuenca as a sporting director, Duró returned to managerial duties in August 2021, after being again named in charge of Riestra. He left the club on 13 June of the following year, before returning to Ecuador on 31 August to take over Delfín.

On 9 May 2024, Duró was sacked by Delfín. On 14 June, he switched teams and countries again after taking over Deportivo Garcilaso in Peru.

On 8 July 2025, Duró was dismissed by Garcilaso, and returned to Ecuador fourteen days later, taking over Emelec. On 3 February 2026, he left the latter by mutual consent, and returned to his home country with Deportivo Riestra on 5 April, before resigning on 27 October.
