= Carlos Calderón (Ecuadorian footballer) =

Ecuadorian footballer and manager (born 1959)

Personal information
- Full name: Carlos Manuel Calderón Jaramillo
- Date of birth: 2 January 1959 (age 67)
- Place of birth: Cayambe, Ecuador
- Position: Defender

Senior career*
Years	Team	Apps	(Gls)
1976–198X	América de Quito		
- Aucas
1985–1986	Filanbanco		
- Universidad Católica
- Deportivo Cuenca
- Macará
- Rocafuerte

International career
- Ecuador

Managerial career
- 1999: Deportivo Saquisilí
- 2002–2004: ESPOLI (assistant)
- 2005–2006: ESPOLI
- 2006: Deportivo Quevedo
- 2007: ESPOLI
- 2007: LDU Loja
- 2007: Universidad Católica
- 2007: Manta
- 2008: Aucas
- 2010–2011: ESPOLI
- 2011: Deportivo Azogues
- 2012: Olmedo
- 2012: ESPOLI
- 2014: ESPOLI
- 2014: UT Cotopaxi
- 2015: Técnico Universitario
- 2021: Deportivo Quito
- 2022: Cumbayá
- * Club domestic league appearances and goals

Carlos Manuel Calderón Jaramillo (born 2 January 1959) is an Ecuadorian football manager and former player who played as a defender.

== Playing career ==
Born in Cayambe, Calderón began his career with América de Quito at the age of 17. He subsequently represented Aucas, Filanbanco, Universidad Católica del Ecuador, Deportivo Cuenca, Macará and Rocafuerte. He also played for the Ecuador national team in the 1980s.

== Coaching career ==
After retiring, Calderón became a manager and led Deportivo Saquisilí to the Serie B in 1999. He was an assistant manager at ESPOLI before being named manager of the side for the 2005 season, and led the club back to the Serie A at the end of the campaign.

Sacked by ESPOLI on 29 May 2006, Calderón took over Deportivo Quevedo in August. He then returned to ESPOLI for the 2007 season, leaving after four matches and taking over LDU Loja in April.

For the remainder of the 2007 season, Calderón was in charge of Universidad Católica and Manta. On 4 June 2008, he was presented as manager of Aucas, but resigned on 13 September.

On 16 November 2009, Calderón returned to ESPOLI for the ensuing campaign. He was sacked on 18 February 2011, and subsequently worked for a short period at Deportivo Azogues.

Calderón was named at the helm of Olmedo on 7 December 2011, but resigned the following 12 February. Ten days later, he returned to ESPOLI, but opted to leave at the end of the season.

On 24 December 2013, Calderón returned to ESPOLI once again. He left and took over Universidad Técnica de Cotopaxi before being named in charge of Técnico Universitario on 8 December 2014.

Calderón resigned from Técnico on 25 May 2015, and remained without a club for nearly six years before being appointed Deportivo Quito manager on 7 June 2021. He left at the end of the season, after failing to qualify to the final stages of Segunda Categoría.

On 20 May 2022, Calderón returned to the top tier after being named manager of Cumbayá, but was sacked on 6 September.
