= Gabriel Perrone =

Argentine footballer and coach

Personal information
- Full name: Gabriel Gustavo Perrone
- Date of birth: 1965 (age 60–61)
- Place of birth: Buenos Aires, Argentina
- Position: Central defender

Senior career*
Years	Team	Apps	(Gls)
1986–1988	River Plate	13	(0)
1988–1990	Ferro Carril Oeste	28	(0)
1990–?	Atlanta	1	(0)
- CD FAS

Managerial career
- –1999: Gimnasia La Plata (assistant)
- 1999–2000: Real Betis (assistant)
- 2000–2001: Gimnasia La Plata (assistant)
- 2002: Unión Santa Fe (assistant)
- 2003–2004: Gimnasia La Plata (assistant)
- 2006–2007: Olmedo
- 2008: Deportivo Cuenca
- 2008–2009: Emelec
- 2010–2011: Manta FC
- 2011–2012: Rangers
- 2012–2013: San Martín de San Juan
- 2014: Olmedo
- 2014–2015: All Boys
- 2017: River Plate Ecuador
- 2017: Guayaquil City
- * Club domestic league appearances and goals

Gabriel Gustavo Perrone (born 1965 in Buenos Aires) is a retired Argentine footballer who currently works as a coach.

== Playing career ==
As a player, Perrone played as a central defender, and he started his career playing for Argentine giants River Plate, where he played for two seasons from 1986 to 1988. Then he was transferred to Ferro Carril Oeste, where he stayed for another couple of seasons. He did not have great success as a player his career was ended by a Cruciate ligament injury after playing in the lower leagues with Atlanta and CD FAS of El Salvador.

== Coaching career ==
Perrone started his work as a football coach as the assistant manager to Carlos Griguol and then Daniel Bertoni for a number of top division teams in Argentina such as Gimnasia y Esgrima de La Plata and River Plate.

Perrone took the step up to first team coaching in Ecuador, managing with relative success teams like Olmedo and Deportivo Cuenca. In the city of Riobamba coaching a very modest Olmedo he finished fourth at the end of the 2006 season, he was then hired by Deportivo Cuenca for the next two seasons. In Cuenca he managed to make his team a contender for the title and to qualify for the 2008 Copa Libertadores. In the 2008 season he was having a pretty good year, qualifying early to the final stages of the Ecuadorian championship, but the club's financial problems were unsustainable, and he resigned as its manager. Soon after he left, many of his players followed him. It is said that when he left, the club owed him hundreds of thousands of dollars in unpaid salary.

Soon after he left Deportivo Cuenca, he initiated negotiations with Ecuadorian giants Emelec. Rumours were quickly dispelled, and the club announced Perrone as its new coach for the next two seasons. Along with Perrone Emelec hired many of Deportivo Cuenca's best players like Javier Klimowicz, Marcelo Fleitas, Polo Wila, and Mariano Mina.

Perrone's teams are usually organized and conservative, taking few risks in defence and being effective in attack. He is also very famous in Ecuador for hiring mostly unknown players who end up playing well.

Before Ecuador's National Team officialized Sixto Vizuete as its head coach, the Ecuadorian press considered Perrone as the first candidate to take that job.

In 2011 Perrone became the coach of Rangers of Talca, a team which was playing in the Second Division of Chile, getting second place in the championship, and then going up to the First Division of Chile since 2012.

In 2014, he returned to Olmedo. In December of the same year, he returned to Argentina and signed with All Boys.

In 2017, Perrone led River Plate Ecuador, later known as Guayaquil City.

== Personal life ==
Perrone is married to one of the daughters of famous Argentine coach Carlos Griguol. He acted as a mentor for Perrone's coaching career and has even visited Perrone during some of his spells as coach in many of his teams.

In January 2008, he had to be taken to a hospital for severe chest pains caused by stress. He stayed in the hospital in Cuenca for a couple of days after a cardiac problem was ruled out.
