= José Luis Quiñónez =

Ecuadorian footballer (born 1984)

José Luis Quiñonez
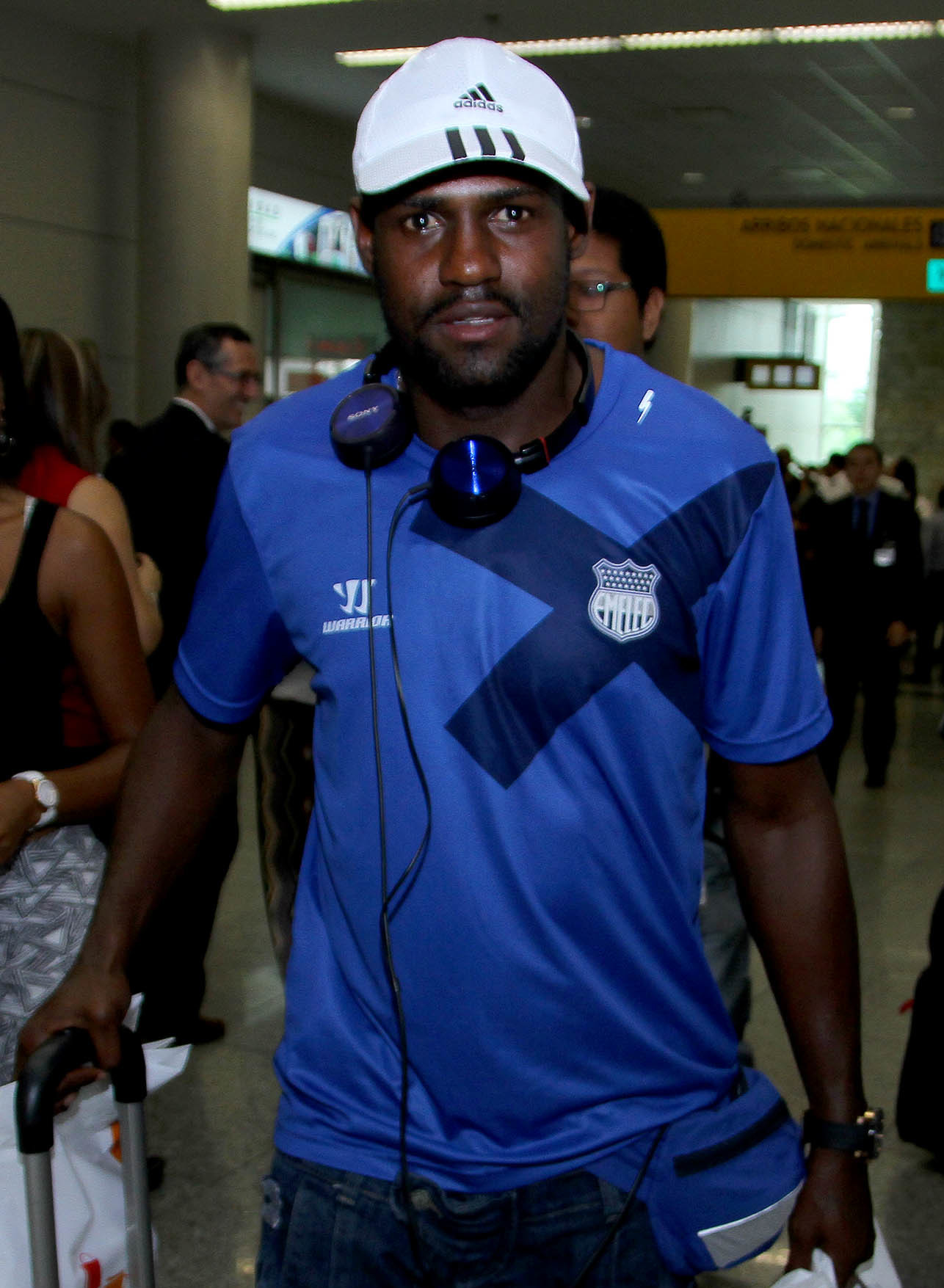
- Quiñonez in 2015

Personal information
- Full name: José Luis Quiñonez Quiñonez
- Date of birth: May 29, 1984 (age 42)
- Place of birth: Guayaquil, Ecuador
- Height: 1.82 m (6 ft 0 in)
- Position: Center back

Senior career*
Years	Team	Apps	(Gls)
2004	Emelec	2	(0)
2005	LDU de Portoviejo	29	(?)
2006–present	Emelec	119	(6)
- * Club domestic league appearances and goals as of 28 February 2008 ‡ National team caps and goals as of 28 February 2008

José Luis Quiñonez Quiñonez (born May 29, 1984) is an Ecuadorian footballer. He currently plays as a midfielder for Emelec in the Ecuadorian Football League, but can play as a defender. He has played 150 games as of February 28, 2008.

== Playing style ==
Quiñonez was given the nickname El Pulpo (The Octopus) because of his marking skills..
