= Juan Silva (footballer, born 1948) =

Uruguayan footballer (born 1948)

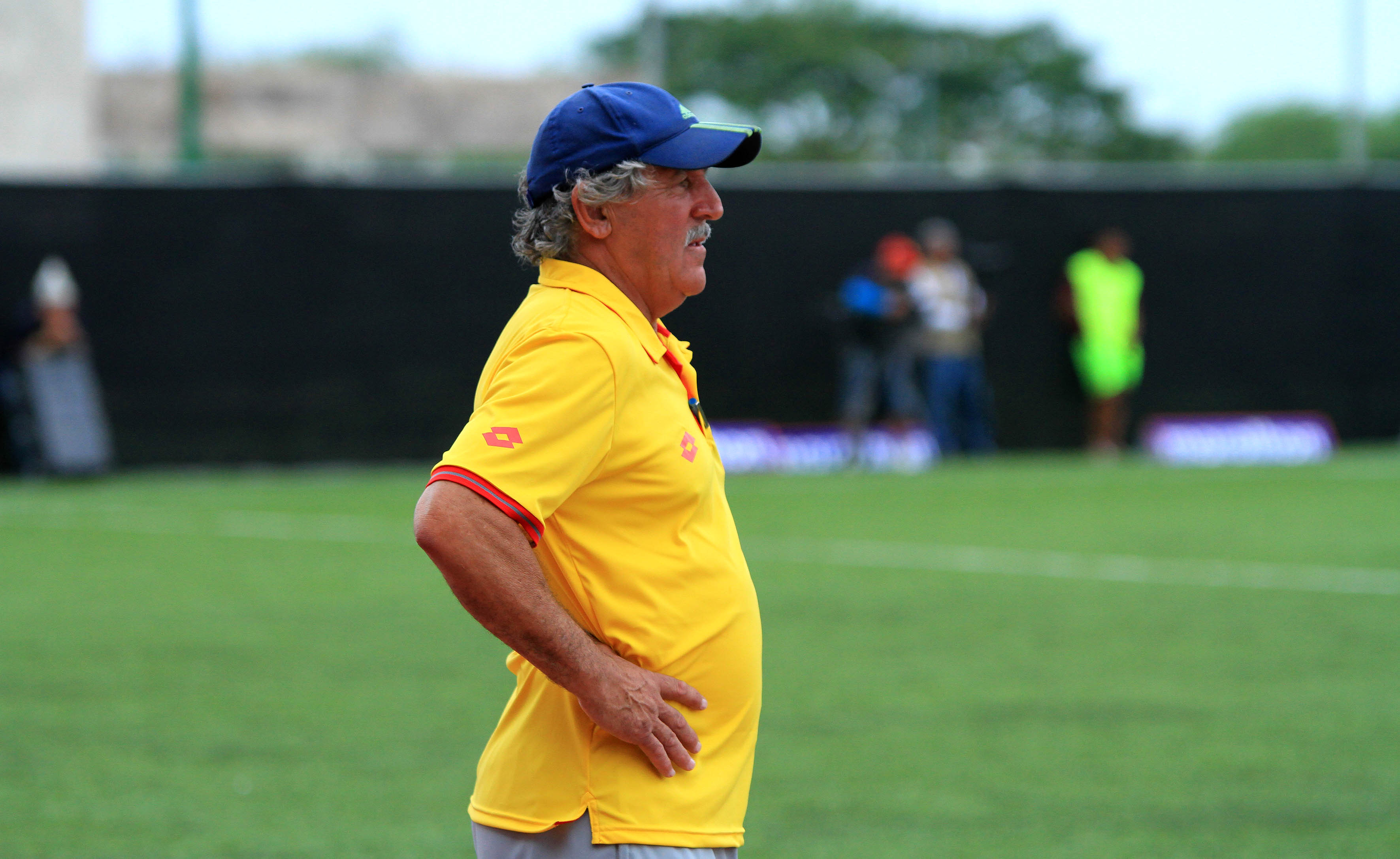

Personal information
- Full name: Juan Ramón Silva
- Date of birth: August 30, 1948 (age 78)
- Place of birth: Uruguay

International career
Years	Team	Apps	(Gls)
- Uruguay

Juan Ramón Silva (born 30 August 1948) is a Uruguayan former professional footballer with Uruguayan club C.A. Peñarol and was part of the Uruguayan Squad at the World Cup in Germany in 1974. He played as a forward.
