= Mariano Mina =

Ecuadorian footballer (born 1979)

Personal information
- Full name: Mariano Florencio Mina Orobio
- Date of birth: March 3, 1979 (age 47)
- Place of birth: Esmeraldas, Ecuador
- Height: 1.82 m (6 ft 0 in)
- Position: Centre back

Senior career*
Years	Team	Apps	(Gls)
2003	Esmeraldas Petrolero		
2004–2005	Barcelona SC	16	(0)
2006–2007	Macará	69	(0)
2008	Deportivo Cuenca	31	(0)
2009–2010	Emelec	39	(2)
2011	Deportivo Quito		
2012	Emelec		
2013	Deportivo Cuenca		

International career^{‡}
2001	Ecuador		
- * Club domestic league appearances and goals ‡ National team caps and goals as of February 28, 2008

Mariano Florencio Mina Orobio (born March 3, 1979) is an Ecuadorian footballer who plays as a center back for the top level Ecuadorian club Emelec.

== Career ==
He started his career in several lower division teams before being signed in 2004 by then first division club Aucas, however he never played one match with Aucas which gave it away on loan for 2 seasons to Barcelona.

Success in Barcelona avoided him and he was transferred on a free to Macará where he stayed for 2 seasons and then he was signed by Deportivo Cuenca where he played very well, this attracted the interest of Ecuadorian giants Emelec, which signed the player at the end of 2008. He immediately established himself as a first team regular and won his first cap for the Ecuadorian National Squad.
