= Jorge Célico =

Argentine football manager

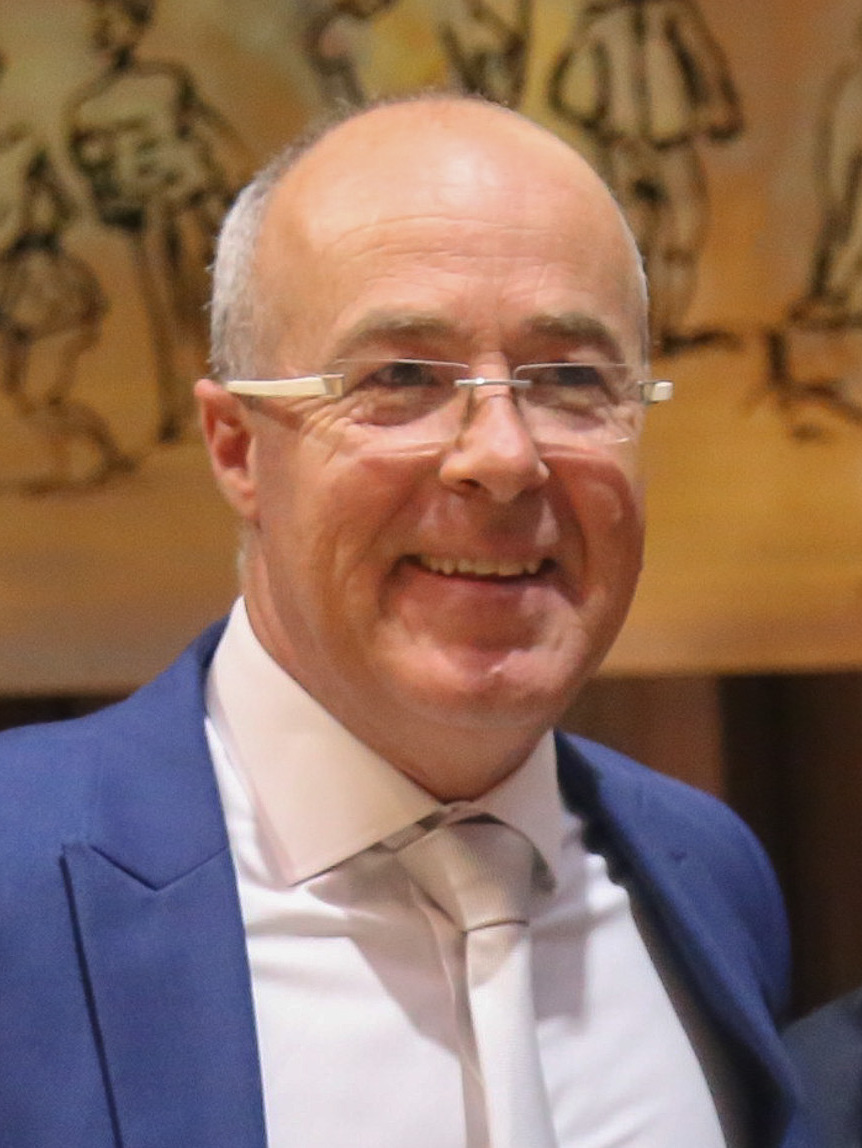
- Célico in 2019

Personal information
- Full name: Jorge César Fortunato Célico
- Date of birth: 13 September 1964 (age 62)
- Place of birth: Buenos Aires, Argentina
- Position: Goalkeeper

Team information
- Current team: Libertad FC (manager)

Youth career
- Huracán

Senior career*
Years	Team	Apps	(Gls)
1982	Huracán	0	(0)

Managerial career
- Nueva Chicago (assistant)
- 1995: Huracán (youth)
- 1996: Almagro (assistant)
- 1997–2001: Huracán (youth)
- 2001: San Martín de Burzaco
- 2002: Huracán (youth)
- 2002: Huracán (interim)
- 2003: Huracán
- 2003: Universidad Católica del Ecuador
- 2006–2008: El Nacional (youth)
- 2008–2009: El Nacional
- 2009: Técnico Universitario
- 2010: Universidad Católica (youth)
- 2010–2017: Universidad Católica
- 2017–2022: Ecuador U20
- 2017–2018: Ecuador
- 2019–2020: Ecuador
- 2020–2022: Ecuador U23
- 2022: Barcelona SC
- 2023: Deportivo Garcilaso
- 2024: Universidad Católica del Ecuador
- 2025: Emelec
- 2026: Deportivo Cuenca
- 2026–: Libertad FC
Medal record
Men's football
Representing Ecuador (as manager)
FIFA U-20 World Cup
Bronze medal – third place	2019
- * Club domestic league appearances and goals

Jorge César Fortunato Célico (born 13 September 1964) is an Argentine retired football manager and former player who played as a goalkeeper. He is the current manager of Ecuadorian club Libertad FC.

== Career ==
A Huracán youth player, Buenos Aires-born Célico was promoted to the first team in 1982, appearing once on the bench but being subsequently released. He spent the remainder of his career in the lower leagues before retiring in 1990.

After working as an assistant at Nueva Chicago and Almagro, Célico was appointed interim manager of his first club Huracán, after previously working in the club's youth setup. His maiden game in charge occurred on 1 September 2002, a 2–1 away win against River Plate.

On 10 March 2003, Célico took over Huracán for the second time, now in charge until the end of the season. After failing to avoid relegation, he subsequently moved abroad after being appointed Universidad Católica del Ecuador manager.

Célico moved to El Nacional in 2006, initially working with the youth setup. In 2008 he was appointed first team manager, but was relieved from his duties on 29 January 2009 after a 5–0 loss against Nacional.

On 13 March 2009, Célico was named Técnico Universitario manager. After suffering relegation, he left the club and returned to Universidad Católica, now working with the youth side.

On 21 September 2010, Célico was appointed manager of the main squad, seriously threatened with relegation. He again dropped a division at the end of the campaign, but remained in charge of the club for the following six seasons.

On 17 July 2017, Célico was named Ecuador under-20 manager. On 12 September, he replaced sacked Gustavo Quinteros at the helm of the full side.

== Honours ==
Universidad Católica

- Ecuadorian Serie B: 2012

Ecuador U20

- FIFA U-20 World Cup third place: 2019
