= Carlos Quiñónez (footballer, born 1980) =

Ecuadorian footballer

Personal information
- Full name: Carlos Andrés Quiñónez Valencia
- Date of birth: August 18, 1980 (age 46)
- Place of birth: Muisne, Esmeraldas, Ecuador
- Height: 1.73 m (5 ft 8 in)
- Position: Right winger

Senior career*
Years	Team	Apps	(Gls)
1999–2012	Emelec	245	(11)

International career^{‡}
2004	Ecuador	1	(0)
- * Club domestic league appearances and goals as of October 3, 2008 ‡ National team caps and goals as of February 28, 2008

Carlos Andrés Quiñónez (born August 18, 1980) is a retired Ecuadorian footballer who played as a right winger. He spent his entire professional career (2000–2012) with the top level Ecuadorian club Emelec.

== Playing style ==
As a youth player, he tried out for Dutch giant AFC Ajax where he spent about a year but never got a chance to play on their first team. In 1999, he returned to Ecuador, where he played a few matches for the U18 division of Emelec. In 2000, he made his debut with Emelec's First Division squad and remained with the club until 2012, year in which he retired from professional soccer. He played for Ecuador's national team against Chile in 2004.

In 2009, he was awarded the gold "Fair Play" medal by the Ecuadorian Football Federation (FEF) for his high standard of correct play.
