= Claudio Otermín =

Argentine footballer

Personal information
- Full name: Claudio Fabián Otermín
- Date of birth: 18 March 1961 (age 65)
- Place of birth: Los Toldos, Buenos Aires, Argentina
- Height: 1.75 m (5 ft 9 in)
- Position: Forward

Youth career
- Independiente

Senior career*
Years	Team	Apps	(Gls)
1980–1981	Independiente		
1981–1982	Sarmiento de Junín	48	(8)
1983	Mallorca	5	(0)
1983	Nueva Chicago	37	(3)
1983	O'Higgins	13	(2)
1984	Deportes Arica	25	(8)
1985	Real Valladolid	0	(0)
1985–1986	Gimnasia LP	18	(2)
1986–1987	Istres	15	(1)
1987–1990	Angoulême		
1992–1993	Kimberley		

Managerial career
- El Linqueño
- Sarmiento de Vedia
- Deportivo Merlo
- 2009–2010: Olmedo
- 2013: Ferro de Olavarría
- 2014: Sportivo Las Parejas
- * Club domestic league appearances and goals

Claudio Fabián Otermín (born March 18, 1961, in Buenos Aires, Argentina) is a former Argentine footballer who played for clubs of Argentina, Chile, Spain and France. He played as a centre forward.

== Teams ==
- (Argentina) Independiente 1980–1981
- (Argentina) Sarmiento de Junín 1981–1982
- (Spain) Mallorca 1983
- (Argentina) Nueva Chicago 1983
- (Chile) O'Higgins 1983
- (Chile) Deportes Arica 1984
- (Spain) Real Valladolid 1985
- (Argentina) Gimnasia y Esgrima de La Plata 1985–1986
- (France) Istres 1986–1987
- (France) Angoulême 1987–1990
- (Argentina) Kimberley de Mar del Plata 1992–1993

== Coaching career ==
Otermín coached clubs in his homeland such as El Linqueño, Ferro Carril Sud de Olavarría, Sportivo Las Parejas, among others.

Since 2015, he has worked as a scout for River Plate.
