= Javier Klimowicz =

Argentine-born Ecuadorian footballer (born 1977)

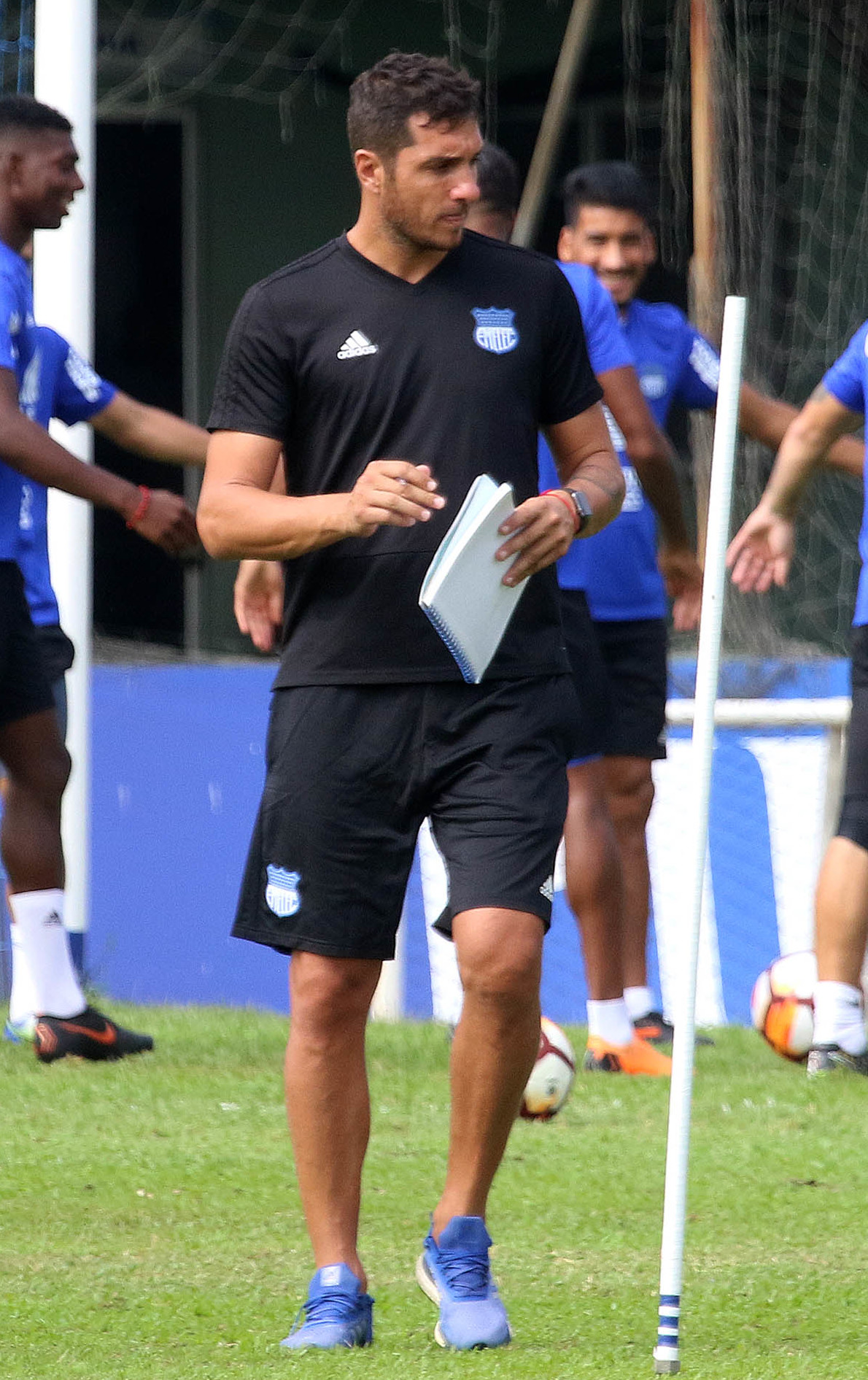

Personal information
- Full name: Javier Hernán Klimowicz
- Date of birth: 10 March 1977 (age 49)
- Place of birth: Quilmes, Buenos Aires, Argentina
- Height: 1.89 m (6 ft 2 in)
- Position: Goalkeeper

Youth career
- Instituto

Senior career*
Years	Team	Apps	(Gls)
1998–2002	Instituto	54	(0)
2002–2004	Blooming	42	(0)
2004–2008	Deportivo Cuenca	157	(0)
2008–2017	Emelec	47	(0)

International career
2007	Ecuador	2	(0)
- * Club domestic league appearances and goals

Javier Hernán Klimowicz Laganá (born 10 March 1977) is a former Argentine-born Ecuadorian footballer who played as a goalkeeper.

Klimowicz started his playing career in 1998 with Instituto de Córdoba and made his official debut in the Argentine Primera División on 9 April 2000, in a draw against Ferro Carril Oeste. In 2002, he signed with Bolivian team Blooming before moving to Ecuador to join Deportivo Cuenca in 2004. For the season 2009, he transferred to popular club CS Emelec.

He has been naturalised and capped for Ecuador's national team. He has started some matches as Ecuador's starting goalkeeper.

== Personal life ==
He is the brother of forwards Diego and Nicolás, and uncle to midfielder Mateo. The Klimowicz family is of Polish and Ukrainian descent.

== Honours ==
=== Club ===
- Deportivo Cuenca
  - Serie A de Ecuador: 2004
