= Centro Deportivo Olmedo =

Ecuadorian association football club

Olmedo
- Full name: Centro Deportivo Olmedo
- Nicknames: El ciclón andino El ciclón de los Andes; El ídolo riobambeño Decano del fútbol ecuatoriano El campeón del siglo XXI; El campeón del milenio El Equipo Centenario
- Founded: November 11, 1919; 106 years ago
- Ground: Estadio Olímpico de Riobamba
- Capacity: 14,400
- Chairman: Marcelo Pérez
- Manager: Omar Ledesma
- League: Segunda Categoría
- 2022: Serie B, 10th (relegated)
Home colours	Away colours	Third colours

Centro Deportivo Olmedo is an Ecuadorian professional football club based in Riobamba, Ecuador. They play in the Segunda Categoría.

== History ==
The club won their only national championship in 2000, making them the first club outside Quito and Guayaquil to win a national championship. They have also won two Serie B titles in 1994 and 2003. Internationally, they have played in the Copa Libertadores four times, reaching the Round of 16 once in 2002.

Founded in 1919, Olmedo is one of the oldest clubs in the Serie A or Serie B. Their home stadium is the Estadio Olímpico. In the year 2000 they became the first club in the history of the Ecuadorian Serie A to win a league title that does not come from Quito or Guayaquil.

As of 2021, Olmedo is going through an economic crises that made them officially bankrupt and could be dissolved at the end of the year.

Their biggest rivals are Macará with whom they contest the Clásico Interandino.

== Honours ==
=== National ===
- Serie A
  - Winners (1): 2000
- Serie B
  - Winners (3): 1994, 2003, 2013
- Segunda Categoría
  - Winners (1): 1993

=== Regional ===
- Segunda Categoría de Chimborazo
  - Winners (11): 1973, 1977, 1985, 1987, 1988, 1989, 1991, 1992, 1993, 2023, 2024

== Players ==
As of 16 February 2024

Note: Flags indicate national team as defined under FIFA eligibility rules; some limited exceptions apply. Players may hold more than one non-FIFA nationality.

No.	Pos.	Nation	Player
3	DF	ECU	Santiago Mallitasig
5	MF	ECU	Adonis Olvera
7	MF	ECU	Alexander Ushiña
9	FW	ARG	Jorge Detona
10	MF	ECU	Wagner Alvarez
11	FW	ECU	Brando Chala
18	DF	ECU	Alexander de Jesus
19	FW	ECU	Frank Obando
20	DF	ECU	Néfer Moreira
25	GK	ECU	Robert Toloza

No.	Pos.	Nation	Player
30	GK	ECU	Alexis Tenorio
45	MF	ECU	Ariel Perea
50	MF	ECU	Cristian Sánchez
52	FW	ECU	Engels Charcopa
54	DF	ECU	Josue Cuji
56	DF	ECU	John Bagui
59	MF	ECU	Mateo Verdezoto
65	MF	ECU	David Ortiz
77	MF	ECU	Henry Jaramillo

=== World Cup players ===
The following players were chosen to represent their country at the FIFA World Cup while contracted to Olmedo.

- (Ecuador) José Luis Perlaza (2006)

== Managers ==
- (Uruguay) Juan Ramon Silva (1997)
- (Argentina) Miguel Lemme (1999)
- (Argentina) Julio Asad (July 1, 2000 – December 30, 2000)
- (Argentina) Enrique Della Vechia (2001)
- (Argentina) Fernando Donaires (January 1, 2002 - May 7, 2002)
- (Argentina) Ariel Cuffaro (May 14, 2002 - August 4, 2002)
- (Argentina) Julio Asad (August 9, 2002 - December 31, 2002)
- (Uruguay) Rosario Martinez (January 1, 2003 - July 2, 2003)
- (Argentina) Roque Alfaro (July 2, 2003 - March 12, 2004)
- (Serbia) Dragan Miranovic (March 12, 2004 - August 5, 2004)
- (Ecuador) Segundo Montaño (August 5, 2004 - December 31, 2004)
- (Argentina) Salvador Raguza (January 1, 2005 -July 11, 2005)
- (Argentina) Pedro Monzón (July 18, 2005 – Dec 3, 2005)
- (Ecuador) Luis Valdivieso (December 4, 2005 - December 21, 2005)
- (Argentina) Gabriel Perrone (Jan 3, 2006 – Dec 22, 2006)
- (Argentina) Víctor Marchesini (January 7, 2007 - December 17, 2007)
- (Colombia) Armando Osma (2008)
- (Argentina) Julio Zamora (2008)
- (Ecuador) Héctor González (July 1, 2008 – Dec 16, 2009)
- (Argentina) Claudio Otermin (January 1, 2010 - March 13, 2010)
- (Ecuador) Héctor González (March 14, 2010 – April 20, 2010)
- (Ecuador) Ariel Graziani (2010)
- (Ecuador) Carlos Calderon (Dec 7, 2011 – Feb 12, 2012)
- (Argentina) Juan Amador Sánchez (Feb 14, 2012 – May 1, 2012)
- (Ecuador) Héctor González (May 2, 2012 – June 14, 2012)
- (Argentina) Óscar Pacheco (June 15, 2012 – Oct 2, 2012)
- (Ecuador) Héctor González (Oct 2, 2012 – Oct 10, 2012)
- (Argentina) Roque Alfaro (Oct 11, 2012 – March 19, 2013)
- (Ecuador) Héctor González (March 19, 2013 – November 20, 2013)
- (Argentina) Gabriel Perrone (November 20, 2013 - July 18, 2014)
- (Uruguay) Mario Saralegui (July 18, 2014 - October 7, 2014))
- (Ecuador) Héctor González (October 7, 2014 - November 14, 2014)
- (Argentina) Juan Urquiza (November 15, 2014 - February 28, 2015)
- (Ecuador) Carlos Sevilla (February 28, 2015 - August 26, 2015)
- (Ecuador) Héctor González (August 26, 2015 - December 13, 2015)
- (Spain) Vicente Girona (December 17, 2015 – March 25, 2016)
- (Argentina) Julio Asad (March 29, 2016 - September 8, 2016)
- (Ecuador) Omar Ledesma (September 8, 2016 - December 13, 2016)
- (Argentina) Claudio Chacior (January 12, 2017 - August 8, 2017)
- (Ecuador) Omar Ledesma (August 9, 2017 - January 4, 2018)
- (Ecuador) Pablo Bravo (January 5, 2018 - May 30, 2018)
- (Argentina) Ricardo Dillon (June 30, 2018 - November 5, 2019)
- (Argentina) Dario Franco (December 9, 2019 - June 20, 2020)
- (Ecuador) Geovanny Cumbicus (June 18, 2020 - December 31, 2020)
- (Argentina) Pablo Trobbiani (January 1, 2021 - May 28, 2021)
- (Ecuador) Cesar Ramos (July 17, 2021 - August 2, 2021)
- (Ecuador) Luis Espinel (August 9, 2021 - September 26, 2021)
- (Ecuador) Nelson Brito (October 3, 2021 - October 31, 2021)
- (Ecuador) Héctor González (November 6, 2021 -)
