= Mario Saralegui =

Uruguayan footballer and manager (born 1959)

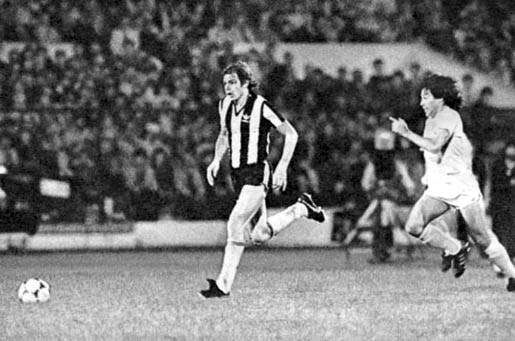
- Saralegui (center) playing for Peñarol in 1982

Personal information
- Full name: Mario Daniel Saralegui Iriarte
- Date of birth: 24 April 1959 (age 67)
- Place of birth: Artigas, Uruguay
- Height: 1.79 m (5 ft 10 in)
- Position: Midfielder

Youth career
- Peñarol

Senior career*
| Years | Team | Apps | (Gls) |
| 1977–1985 | Peñarol | 221 | (6) |
| 1985 | Elche | 24 | (0) |
| 1985-86 | Peñarol (loan) | 29 | (0) |
| 1986–1987 | → River Plate (loan) | 15 | (2) |
| 1987–1988 | → Estudiantes (loan) | 18 | (1) |
| 1988–1989 | Peñarol | 25 | (1) |
| 1990-92 | Barcelona SC | 82 | (2) |
| 1992–1993 | Peñarol | 8 | (0) |
| 1994 | Rampla Juniors | 5 | (0) |

International career
| 1979–1986 | Uruguay | 29 | (2) |

Managerial career
- 1996: Artigas
- 1997: Frontera Rivera
- 1998: Barcelona SC (caretaker)
- 2000–2001: Peñarol (youth)
- 2002–2003: Wanderers de Artigas
- 2006: Peñarol (youth)
- 2006: Peñarol
- 2006: Uruguay Montevideo
- 2007–2008: Progreso
- 2008–2009: Peñarol
- 2009–2010: Central Español
- 2010–2012: El Nacional
- 2012: Técnico Universitario
- 2013: Juventud de Las Piedras
- 2014: Olmedo
- 2014: Tacuarembó
- 2016–2017: Liverpool Montevideo
- 2018: LDU Portoviejo
- 2020: Peñarol
- 2022: Carlos A. Mannucci
- 2022: Cerro Largo
- 2022–2023: CA Artigas
- 2023–2024: Danubio
Medal record
Representing Uruguay
Copa América
| Winner | 1983 |
CONMEBOL–UEFA Cup of Champions
| Runner-up | 1985 France |
- * Club domestic league appearances and goals

Mario Daniel Saralegui Iriarte (born 24 April 1959 in Artigas) is a Uruguayan football manager and former player who played as a midfielder.

== Career ==
Having made his official debut on May 31, 1979, against Brazil (1-5), Saralegui obtained a total number of 24 international caps for the Uruguay national football team. He represented his native country at the 1986 FIFA World Cup, wearing the number sixteen jersey.

Saralegui played most of his career for Peñarol in Uruguay, the only Uruguayan team he ever played for. He won 6 Uruguayan Primera championships a Copa Libertadores and a Copa Intercontinental during his four spells with the club.

Saralegui played for a number of non-Uruguayan teams including Elche of Spain, River Plate and Estudiantes de La Plata of Argentina and Barcelona SC of Ecuador.

After retiring as a player, he had a spell as manager of Peñarol, where he led them to the Clausura 2008 championship with a 5–3 victory over River Plate de Montevideo in the championship playoff. In September 2020, he became the manager of Peñarol for the third time.

== In politics ==
In May 2021, Saralegui assumed as Representative, taking the place of Valentina dos Santos.

== Honours ==
=== Player ===
Peñarol

- Uruguayan Primera División: 1978, 1979, 1981, 1982, 1985, 1993
- Copa Libertadores: 1982
- Intercontinental Cup: 1982

River Plate

- Copa Libertadores: 1986
- Intercontinental Cup: 1986

=== Manager ===
Peñarol

- Clausura 2008
