= Luis Soler =

Argentine football player and manager

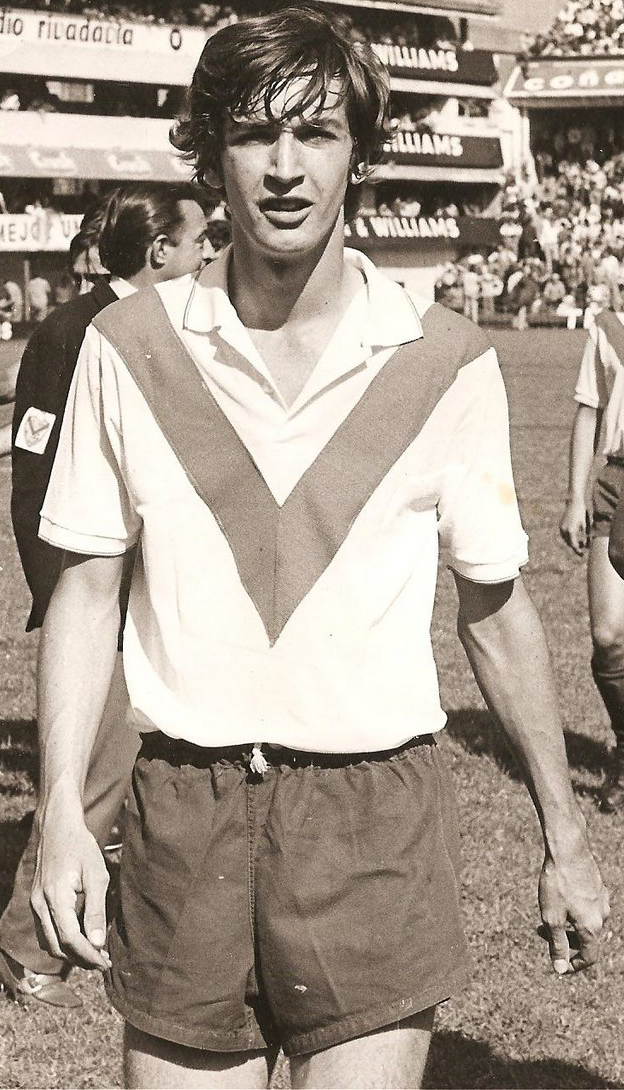

Personal information
- Full name: Luis Gustavo Soler Magadán
- Date of birth: 9 June 1951 (age 75)
- Place of birth: Buenos Aires, Argentina
- Position: Defender

Team information
- Current team: Barcelona SC (manager)

Senior career*
Years	Team	Apps	(Gls)
1975–1977	Recreativo de Huelva	20	(0)

Managerial career
- 2013: Barcelona SC
- * Club domestic league appearances and goals

Luis Gustavo Soler Magadán (born 9 June 1951) is an Argentine football coach and former professional player.

== Career ==
Born in Buenos Aires, Soler played as a defender for Spanish club Recreativo de Huelva.

He was appointed manager of Ecuadorian club Barcelona SC in August 2013.
