= Marcelo Fleitas =

Uruguayan-Ecuadorian football coach (born 1973)

Personal information
- Full name: Julio Marcelo Fleitas Silveira
- Date of birth: 1 September 1973 (age 53)
- Place of birth: Montevideo, Uruguay
- Height: 1.79 m (5 ft 10 in)
- Position: Defender

Senior career*
Years	Team	Apps	(Gls)
1996–1997	Leandro Alem		
1997–1998	Defensa y Justicia	8	(0)
1998–2000	Leandro Alem		
2000–2002	Olmedo	106	(11)
2003–2004	Barcelona	71	(2)
2005–2008	Deportivo Cuenca	135	(9)
2009–2011	Emelec	96	(5)

International career
2009–2010	Ecuador	4	(0)

Managerial career
- 2011–2012: Emelec
- 2016: Deportivo Quito
- 2017: Fuerza Amarilla
- 2017: Orense
- 2022: Macará (assistant)
- 2022: Macará
- * Club domestic league appearances and goals

Julio Marcelo Fleitas Silveira (born 1 September 1973) is an Ecuadorian football manager and former player who played as a defender.

== Club career ==
Born in Montevideo, Uruguay, Fleitas is a retired player that played most of his professional career in Ecuador. Although he is Uruguayan by birth, he is a curiosity because he has never played for any professional team of Uruguay in any division. When he was just starting his career, he moved to Argentina and played there for small lower division clubs Leandro Alem and Defensa y Justicia before travelling to Ecuador to play for Olmedo.

In Riobamba, Fleitas quickly showed that he was a very versatile, brave, fast and valuable defender, helping CD Olmedo to win their first and only Ecuadorian title in 2000. He played there for 3 seasons before signing for Barcelona S.C. for two seasons, where he also played very well, but the club's poor performance in both seasons made him leave the club. Then he was transferred to Deportivo Cuenca where he played the last 3 seasons and where he helped the team to qualify to two consecutive Copa Libertadores and he became one of the team's captains. Before the end of 2008 he was transferred to Emelec due to Deportivo Cuenca's financial crisis.

== International career ==
Fleitas has played for over 8 seasons in the Ecuadorian league and because of this he decided to become an Ecuadorian citizen. Since he was never capped for his country of birth (Uruguay), he is eligible to play for the Ecuador national team. He received his first call-up for 2010 FIFA World Cup qualifiers against Peru and Argentina. He received his first cap on June 7, 2009 against Peru in a game that Ecuador won, 1-2.
