= Estadio Jocay =

- Interactive map of Estadio Jocay
- Full name: Estadio Municipal Jocay
- Former names: Estadio Modelo de Manta
- Location: Manta, Ecuador
- Coordinates: 0°57′50″S 80°42′11″W
- Capacity: 21,000
- Surface: Grass

Tenants
- Delfín; Manta; Green Cross; Juventud Italiana

The Estadio Municipal Jocay is a multi-use stadium in Manta, Ecuador. It is currently used mostly for football matches and is the home stadium of Delfín S.C. of the Serie A de Ecuador and Manta F.C. of the Serie B de Ecuador. The stadium holds 21,000 spectators and opened on 14 January 1962. It is the most westerly stadium in South America.

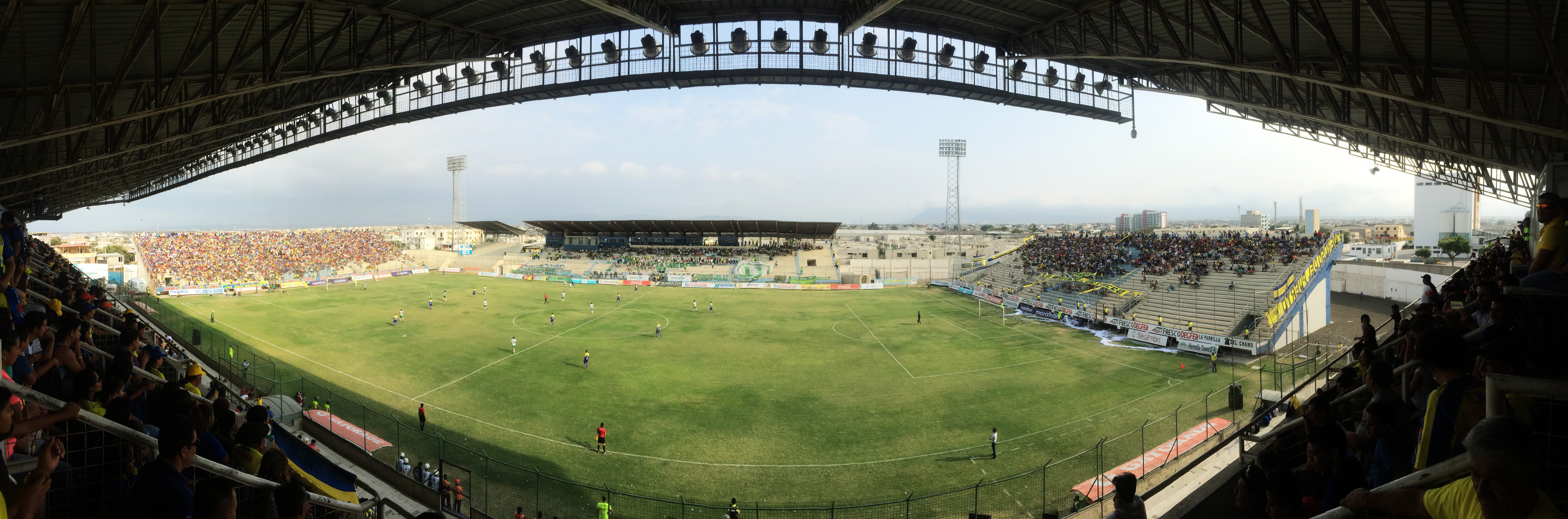
Panoramic view of Estadio Jocay de Manta
