= Carlos Sevilla =

Ecuadorian footballer and manager (born 1950)

Personal information
- Full name: Carlos Edmundo Sevilla Dalgo
- Date of birth: 26 August 1950 (age 76)
- Place of birth: Atuntaqui, Imbabura, Ecuador
- Position: Defender

Senior career*
Years	Team	Apps	(Gls)
1971–1974	Deportivo Quito		
1975	Técnico Universitario		
1976	Deportivo Quito		

Managerial career
- 1984–1986: Deportivo Quito
- 1987: Técnico Universitario
- 1988: Macará
- 1989–1990: El Nacional
- 1991: Deportivo Quito
- 1992–1993: Green Cross
- 1994: ESPOLI
- 1995–1996: LDU Quito
- 1997: ESPOLI
- 1997–1998: Emelec
- 1999: Ecuador
- 2000: Macará
- 2001–2002: Emelec
- 2003: Manta
- 2004: El Nacional
- 2005: Cienciano
- 2005: Macará
- 2005: Barcelona SC
- 2006–2007: Deportivo Azogues
- 2007: Emelec
- 2008: Deportivo Quito
- 2010: Macará
- 2010: Deportivo Quito
- 2011–2012: Independiente José Terán
- 2013: El Nacional
- 2014: Deportivo Quito
- 2015: Olmedo
- 2015: Deportivo Quito
- 2016: Fuerza Amarilla
- 2017: Clan Juvenil
- * Club domestic league appearances and goals

Carlos Edmundo Sevilla Dalgo (born 26 August 1950) in an Ecuadorian former football player and manager of El Nacional.

== Playing career ==
Sevilla had a brief playing career as a defender mainly playing for Deportivo Quito.

== Managerial career ==
In 1984, he debuted as a manager for his former club. He has since managed sixteen other clubs in Ecuador and Peru. In 1999, he briefly managed the Ecuador national team. He led Ecuador to their first international title: the 1999 Canada Cup. At the club level, he has led Emelec and Deportivo Quito to national titles in 2001 and 2008, respectively.

== Honors ==
Ecuador

- Canada Cup: 1999

Emelec

- Serie A: 2001

Deportivo Quito

- Serie A: 2008

== See also ==
- List of football managers with the most matches
