= Julio Asad =

Argentine former footballer and manager

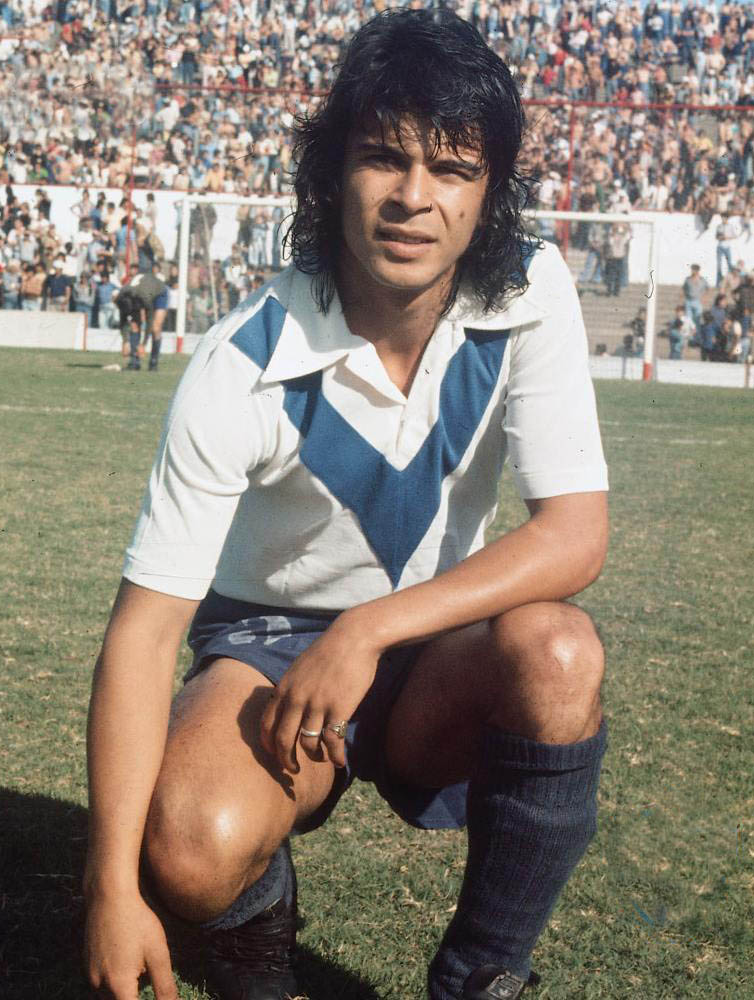
- Asad with Vélez Sársfield

Personal information
- Full name: Julio Asad
- Date of birth: 7 June 1953 (age 73)
- Place of birth: Buenos Aires, Argentina
- Position: Midfielder

Youth career
- 1960–1972: Vélez Sársfield

Senior career*
Years	Team	Apps	(Gls)
1972–77	Vélez Sársfield		
1978–80	Racing Club		
1980–81	Colón		

International career
1975–1976	Argentina	7	(1)

Managerial career
- 1985–1986: Dep. Riestra
- 1986–1987: Ferrocarril Midland
- 1987–1988: Deportivo Maipú
- 1989–1990: Berazategui
- 1990–1991: San Miguel
- 1991–1992: Defensores de Belgrano
- 1994–1995: Colegiales
- 1995–1996: Leandro N. Alem
- 1996–1997: Almirante Brown
- 1997–1998: Sportivo Italiano
- 1998–1999: Leandro N. Alem
- 2000–2001: Olmedo
- 2001–2002: LDU Quito
- 2002–2003: Al Nassr
- 2003–2004: Emelec
- 2004–2005: Dep. Cuenca
- 2005–2006: Dep. Quito
- 2006–2007: FAS
- 2007: Al Nassr
- 2009: El Nacional
- 2010–2011: Independiente del Valle
- 2012–2013: Aucas
- 2014–2015: Mushuc Runa
- 2017: Clan Juvenil
- * Club domestic league appearances and goals

Julio Daniel Asad (Arabic: خوليو أسد; born 7 June 1953) is an Argentine former football player and manager. He played as a midfielder, and participated with Argentina in the 1975 Copa América.

Asad was nicknamed "El Turco" due to his Syrian and Lebanese ethnicity. In Argentina, Arabs were mistakenly called Turks, since they came to Argentina with Ottoman Turkish documents in the 1900s. After he retired from professional football, he became a manager. He has coached clubs in Argentina, Ecuador, Saudi Arabia, and El Salvador.

He is the uncle of Omar Asad, who was also a successful player for Vélez in the 1990s.

== Honours ==
=== Manager ===
Club Deportivo Riestra

- Champion: 1985

Defensores de Belgrano

- Champions: 1991–92

Club Leandro N. Alem

- Champions: Clausura 1996

Centro Deportivo Olmedo

- Champions: 2000

Club Deportivo Cuenca

- Champions: 2004

Al-Nassr

- Federation Cup: 2007

Personal

- Coach Of The Year in Ecuador: 2000, 2001
- Coach Of The Year in Saudi Arabia: 2003
