= 2011 Liga Deportiva Universitaria de Quito season =

LDU Quito
2011 season
- President: Carlos Arroyo
- Manager: Edgardo Bauza
- Stadium: Estadio Casa Blanca
- Serie A: First Stage: 2nd Second Stage: 5th Aggregate: 3rd Overall: 4th
- Copa Libertadores: Round of 16
- Copa Sudamericana: Runner-up
- Top goalscorer: League: Hernán Barcos (16 goals); All: Hernán Barcos (22 goals)
- Highest home attendance: 26,615; (February 6 v. Barcelona)
- Lowest home attendance: 1,016; (June 19 v. Olmedo)
- Average home league attendance: 8,643
Home colours	Away colours

Liga Deportiva Universitaria de Quito's 2011 season was the club's 81st year of existence, the 58th year in professional football, and the 50th in the top level of professional football in Ecuador. Liga came in as the defending Serie A champion and having qualified to the 2011 Copa Libertadores and the 2011 Copa Sudamericana, but failed to win a title for the first time since 2006.

== Club ==
=== Personnel ===
President: Carlos Arroyo
Honorary President: Rodrigo Paz
President of the Executive Commission: Esteban Paz
President of the Football Commission: Edwin Ripalda
Vice-President of the Football Commission: Patricio Torres
Sporting manager: Santiago Jácome

=== Coaching staff ===
Manager: Edgardo Bauza
Assistant manager: José Daniel di Leo
Physical trainer: Alejandro Mur
Goalkeeper trainer: Gustavo Flores
Statistician: Maximiliano Bauza

=== Kits ===
Supplier: Umbro
Sponsor(s): Diners Club International, Chevrolet, Coca-Cola

== Squad information ==
Liga's squad for the season is allowed a maximum of four foreign players at any one time, and a maximum of eight throughout the season. During the off season, Norberto Araujo changed his nationality from Argentine to Ecuadorian. At the start of the season, Liga was mandated to start one under-18 player in each match. Since the Ecuadorian national U-20 team qualified to the 2011 FIFA U-20 World Cup, that was changed to have an under-20 player start in each game. The jersey numbers in the main table (directly below) refer to the number on their domestic league jersey. The under-18/under-20 players will wear a jersey number of at least #50. For each CONMEBOL competition, Liga must register 25 players, whose jerseys will be numbered 1–25. Because of this, some players may have different jersey numbers while playing in CONMEBOL matches.

N	Pos	Nat.	Player	Age	Since	App	Goals	Notes
2	DF	ECU	Norberto Araujo	32	2007	120	0	
3	DF	ECU	Geovanny Caicedo	29	2011	0	0	
4	MF	ECU	Ulises de la Cruz	36	2009	185	26	Previously with the club from '97–'99 and '00
5	MF	ECU	Paúl Ambrosi	30	2010	339	35	Previously with the club from '00–'09
6	DF	ECU	Jorge Guagua	29	2010	36	3	
7	MF	ECU	Miler Bolaños	20	2009	59	15	
8	MF	ECU	Patricio Urrutia (vice-captain)	32	2010	255	43	Previously with the club from '03–'09
9	FW	ECU	Walter Calderón	33	2009	41	9	
10	MF	ECU	Luis Bolaños	25	2011	85	13	Previously with the club from '02–'08
11	FW	ARG	Ezequiel González	30	2011	0	0	
12	DF	ECU	Galo Corozo	20	2009	4	0	
13	DF	ECU	Néicer Reasco (captain)	33	2008	396	30	Previously with the club from '97–'00 and '01–'06
14	DF	ECU	Diego Calderón	24	2007	130	3	Previously with the club in '05
15	MF	ECU	William Araujo	31	2008	95	7	
16	FW	ARG	Hernán Barcos	26	2010	32	22	
17	MF	ECU	Enrique Gámez	29	2010	23	0	
18	MF	ECU	Fernando Hidalgo	25	2011	0	0	
19	FW	ECU	Claudio Bieler	27	2011	63	35	Previously with the club from '08–'09
20	MF	PAR	Enrique Vera	31	2011	108	9	Previously with the club from '06–'08 and '09–'10
21	MF	ARG	Lucas Acosta	23	2011	0	0	
22	GK	ECU	Alexander Domínguez	23	2006	96	0	
23	DF	ECU	Argenis Moreira	23	2011	0	0	
24	DF	ECU	José Valencia	28	2010	7	0	
25	GK	ECU	Daniel Viteri	29	2011	10	0	Previously with the club from '08–'09
50	MF	ECU	Richard Calderón	18	2011	0	0	U-18 player
51	MF	ECU	Ángel Ledesma	17	2011	0	0	U-18 player
52	FW	ECU	José Pabón	20	2010	1	0	U-20 player
53	MF	ECU	Sandro Rojas	17	2011	0	0	U-18 player
54	MF	ECU	Marlon Ganchozo	19	2010	25	0	U-20 player
55	MF	ECU	José Cevallos Enríquez	15	2011	0	0	U-18 player
56	FW	ECU	José Gutiérrez	17	2011	0	0	U-18 player
57	MF	ECU	Raúl Macías	17	2011	0	0	U-18 player
58	MF	ECU	David Carrera	17	2011	0	0	U-18 player
59	DF	ECU	John Subía	16	2011	0	0	U-18 player
61	MF	ECU	David Patiño	19	2011	0	0	U-20 player
63	MF	ECU	Wellington Cedeño	15	2011	0	0	U-18 player
67	DF	ECU	Víctor Carcelén	19	2011	0	0	U-20 player
68	FW	ECU	Luis Carcelén	16	2011	0	0	U-18 player
69	FW	ECU	Diego Hurtado	15	2011	0	0	U-18 player

Note: Caps and goals are of the national league and are current as of the beginning of the season.

=== Winter transfers ===
During the off-season, Liga saw a number of high-profile players leave the squad. Veterans Carlos Espínola, Renan Calle, and Christian Lara left the team to look for more playing time, while Juan Manuel Salgueiro returned to Estudiantes after Liga could not secure a permanent move. Víctor Estupiñán and Joao Plata and went to the United States to take part in the MLS SuperDraft. They were drafted by Chivas USA and Toronto FC. Franklin Salas attempted to move abroad, but failed to find a suitor. After a prolonged process, he was loaned to Imbabura. Other loaned out players were Pedro Romo and Manuel Mendoza to Aucas and Universidad Católica, respectively. Ángel Cheme, better known as Gonzalo Chila, was suspended for two-year due to aggravated identity theft.

To reinforce the squad, Liga signed former stars Luis Bolaños and Enrique Vera, with Daniel Viteri returning after a season on loan. Argenis Moreira, Fernando Hidalgo, and Geovanny Caicedo were also signed. Liga's highest profile transfer was Ezequiel González from Fluminense. This also filled their squad's foreign player quota. Ángel Ledesma was loaned form Macará should the squad need U-18 down the line.

Players In
Name	Nat	Pos	Age	Moving from
Luis Bolaños	ECU	MF	25	Barcelona
Geovanny Caicedo	ECU	DF	29	Deportivo Quito
Ezequiel González	ARG	FW	30	Fluminense (BRA)
Fernando Hidalgo	ECU	MF	25	Barcelona
Ángel Ledesma	ECU	MF	17	Macará (loan)
Argenis Moreira	ECU	DF	23	Macará
Enrique Vera	PAR	MF	31	Atlas (MEX)
Daniel Viteri	ECU	GK	29	Barcelona
Luis Batioja	ECU	FW	16	Youth system
Richard Calderón	ECU	MF	18	Youth system
José Gutiérrez	ECU	GK	17	Youth system
Sandro Rojas	ECU	MF	17	Youth system

Players Out
Name	Nat	Pos	Age	Moving to
Renán Calle	ECU	DF	34	L.D.U. Loja
Ángel Cheme	ECU	MF	29	Two-year suspension
Carlos Espínola	ECU	DF	35	Sporting Cristal (PER)
Gabriel Espinosa	ECU	MF	25	Universidad Católica (loan)
Víctor Estupiñán	ECU	FW	22	Chivas USA (USA)
Christian Lara	ECU	FW	30	El Nacional
Manuel Mendoza	ECU	GK	21	Universidad Católica (loan)
Joao Plata	ECU	FW	18	Toronto FC (USA)
Diego Quintanilla	ECU	MF	19	Aucas (loan)
Pedro Romo	ECU	MF	21	Aucas (loan)
Franklin Salas	ECU	FW	29	Imbabura (loan)
Juan Manuel Salgueiro	URU	FW	27	Estudiantes (ARG); (loan return)

=== Summer transfers ===
On May 16, 2011, veteran goalkeeper José Francisco Cevallos announced his retirement from professional football. He played his last game on May 22. In late July, the club announced that Carlos Luna was loaned to a club to be determined at a later date. Youth-player Nelson Martínez was loaned to Aucas in mid June. That was followed by the late-July loan of forward Luis Batioja to Universidad Católica.

In late July, Liga reinforced their squad with two players transferring from Argentina. Forward Claudio Bieler returned to the club after a year-and-a-half on a loan from Racing. In the time in between, he became a naturalized Ecuadorian, freeing up a foreign-player spot in the team. The remaining foreign-player spot was filled by midfielder Lucas Acosta, who was transferring in from San Martín de San Juan.

Players In
Name	Nat	Pos	Age	Moving from
Lucas Acosta	ARG	MF	23	San Martín (SJ) (ARG) (loan)
Claudio Bieler	ECU	FW	27	Racing (ARG) (loan)

Players Out
Name	Nat	Pos	Age	Moving to
José Francisco Cevallos	ECU	GK	40	Retired
Carlos Luna	ARG	FW	29	Tigre (ARG) (loan)
Nelson Martínez	ECU	MF	19	Aucas (loan)
Luis Batioja	ECU	FW	32	Universidad Católica (loan)
John Jaramillo	ECU	GK	35	Macará (loan)

=== Copa Libertadores squad ===
No.	Pos.	Nation	Player
1	GK	ECU	José Francisco Cevallos
2	DF	ECU	Norberto Araujo
3	DF	ECU	Geovanny Caicedo
4	DF	ECU	Ulises de la Cruz
5	DF	ECU	Paúl Ambrosi
6	DF	ECU	Jorge Guagua
7	MF	ECU	Miler Bolaños
8	MF	ECU	Patricio Urrutia
9	FW	ECU	Walter Calderón
10	MF	ECU	Luis Bolaños
11	FW	ARG	Ezequiel González
12	MF	ECU	Marlon Ganchozo
13	DF	ECU	Néicer Reasco (captain)

No.	Pos.	Nation	Player
14	DF	ECU	Diego Calderón
15	MF	ECU	William Araujo
16	FW	ARG	Hernán Barcos
17	MF	ECU	Galo Corozo*
18	MF	ECU	Fernando Hidalgo
19	MF	ECU	José Cevallos Enríquez
20	MF	PAR	Enrique Vera
21	FW	ARG	Carlos Luna
22	GK	ECU	Alexander Domínguez
23	DF	ECU	Argenis Moreira
24	DF	ECU	José Valencia
25	GK	ECU	Daniel Viteri

*Corozo replaced Enrique Gámez after the Second Stage.

=== Copa Sudamericana squad ===
No.	Pos.	Nation	Player
1	GK	ECU	John Jaramillo*
2	DF	ECU	Norberto Araujo
3	DF	ECU	Geovanny Caicedo
4	DF	ECU	Ulises de la Cruz
5	DF	ECU	Paúl Ambrosi
6	DF	ECU	Jorge Guagua
7	MF	ECU	Miler Bolaños
8	MF	ECU	Patricio Urrutia
9	FW	ECU	Walter Calderón
10	MF	ECU	Luis Bolaños
11	FW	ARG	Ezequiel González
12	MF	ECU	Galo Corozo
13	DF	ECU	Néicer Reasco (captain)

No.	Pos.	Nation	Player
14	DF	ECU	Diego Calderón
15	MF	ECU	William Araujo
16	FW	ARG	Hernán Barcos
17	MF	ECU	Enrique Gámez
18	MF	ECU	Fernando Hidalgo
19	FW	ECU	Claudio Bieler
20	MF	PAR	Enrique Vera
21	FW	ARG	Lucas Acosta
22	GK	ECU	Alexander Domínguez
23	DF	ECU	Argenis Moreira
24	DF	ECU	José Valencia
25	GK	ECU	Daniel Viteri

*Jaramillo replaced Walter Chávez after the First Stage.

== Competitions ==
Competition	Started round	Final position / round	First match	Last match
Serie A	First Stage	4th	Jan 30	Dec 19
Copa Libertadores	Second Stage	Round of 16	Feb 17	May 5
Copa Sudamericana	First Stage	Runner-up	Aug 4	Dec 14

=== Pre-season friendlies ===
Liga played three friendly matches in addition to La Noche Blanca, the club's official presentation for the season. Their opponent for La Noche Blanca was Once Caldas, the defending Colombian champion.

January 15	LDU Quito	2–0	L.D.U. Loja	Pomasqui
10:00 UTC−05:00	Guagua; L. Bolaños			Stadium: Complejo de Pomasqui

January 19	LDU Quito	2–0	Universidad Católica	Pomasqui
10:00 UTC−05:00	González; Luna			Stadium: Complejo de Pomasqui

January 22	LDU Quito	1–2	Independiente del Valle	Quito
10:00 UTC−05:00	Ambrosi		Estigarribia; Ayoví	Stadium: Estadio Casa Blanca

January 26 La Noche Blanca	LDU Quito (Ecuador)	1–1	(Colombia) Once Caldas	Quito
19:15 UTC−05:00	W. Calderón 90+1'		Micolta 55'	Stadium: Estadio Casa Blanca; Referee: Roddy Zambrano

=== Serie A ===
The 2011 season is Liga's 50th season in the Serie A and their tenth consecutive. The league season will run from late January to early December, with a short break for the 2011 Copa América. The format is identical to the previous season. They came in as the defending league champion.

==== First stage ====
The First Stage of the season ran from January 30 to June 19. Liga finished 2nd and failed to qualify to the season-ending Finals and the 2012 Copa Libertadores during this stage.

Pos	Team	Pld	W	D	L	GF	GA	GD	Pts	Qualification
1	Emelec	22	12	8	2	31	15	+16	44	Finals, 2012 Copa Libertadores Second Stage, and 2011 Copa Sudamericana Second Stage
2	LDU Quito	22	11	7	4	29	13	+16	40	
3	Deportivo Quito	22	11	6	5	39	25	+14	39	2011 Copa Sudamericana First Stage (Note: Since LDU Quito was already qualified to the 2011 Copa Sudamericana First Stage as the winner of the 2010 Serie A Second Stage, Deportivo Quito also qualified to the 2011 Copa Sudamericana First Stage.)
4	El Nacional	22	9	5	8	31	23	+8	32	
5	LDU Loja	22	9	5	8	27	27	0	32	

Rules for classification: 1) points; 2) goal difference; 3) number of goals scored.
Notes:

Overall								Home						Away					
Pld	W	D	L	GF	GA	GD	Pts	W	D	L	GF	GA	GD	W	D	L	GF	GA	GD
22	11	7	4	29	13	+16	40	7	2	2	19	6	+13	4	5	2	10	7	+3

January 30 Round 1	Olmedo	1–0	LDU Quito	Riobamba
12:00 UTC−05:00	Gómez 20'	Report		Stadium: Estadio Olímpico; Attendance: 5,896; Referee: Diego Lara

February 6 Round 2	LDU Quito	3–0	Barcelona	Quito
11:30 UTC−05:00	Caicedo 4'; Cevallos, Jr. 44'; Barcos 69'	Report		Stadium: Estadio Casa Blanca; Attendance: 26,615; Referee: Daniel Salazar

February 13 Round 3	Imbabura	1–1	LDU Quito	Ibarra
12:00 UTC−05:00	Salazar 47'	Report	Reasco 84'	Stadium: Estadio Olímpico; Attendance: 12,700; Referee: Carlos Vera

February 23 Round 4	LDU Quito	2–1	Independiente del Valle	Quito
19:30 UTC−05:00	Ganchozo 3'; Moreira 69'	Report	Ayoví 32'	Stadium: Estadio Casa Blanca; Attendance: 3,371; Referee: José Caprio

February 20 Round 5	LDU Quito	5–0	Manta	Quito
11:30 UTC−05:00	Moreira 40'; L. Bolaños 69' de la Cruz 83'; W. Calderón 85', 87'	Report		Stadium: Estadio Casa Blanca; Attendance: 3,433; Referee: Sandro Vera

February 27 Round 6	El Nacional	1–2	LDU Quito	Quito
13:10 UTC−05:00	Zura 90+3'	Report	González 23'; M. Bolaños 43'	Stadium: Estadio Olímpico Atahualpa; Attendance: 20,350; Referee: Samuel Haro

March 13 Round 9	LDU Quito	2–0	ESPOLI	Quito
11:30 UTC−05:00	W. Calderón 13'; Barcos 90+1'	Report		Stadium: Estadio Casa Blanca; Attendance: 2,728; Referee: Roddy Zambrano

March 20 Round 10	L.D.U. Loja	1–2	LDU Quito	Loja
18:30 UTC−05:00	Vaca 78'	Report	L. Bolaños 10', 29'	Stadium: Estadio Federativo Reina del Cisne; Attendance: 15,281; Referee: Daniel Salazar

March 23 Round 8	Deportivo Cuenca	0–2	LDU Quito	Cuenca
20:40 UTC−05:00		Report	W. Calderón 2'; L. Bolaños 37'	Stadium: Estadio Alejandro Serrano Aguilar; Attendance: 15,247; Referee: Miguel Hidalgo
Note: The match was originally scheduled for March 9, but was postponed because it was scheduled on the same date of Liga's Copa Libertadores match at Peñarol.

April 9 Round 12	Deportivo Quito	0–0	LDU Quito	Quito
19:00 UTC−05:00		Report		Stadium: Estadio Olímpico Atahualpa; Attendance: 15,059; Referee: Carlos Vera

April 17 Round 13	LDU Quito	1–1	L.D.U. Loja	Quito
11:30 UTC−05:00	L. Bolaños 27'	Report	Tenorio 20'	Stadium: Estadio Casa Blanca; Attendance: 5,524; Referee: José Espinel

April 20 Round 15	LDU Quito	1–0	Deportivo Cuenca	Quito
20:00 UTC−05:00	de la Cruz 85'	Report		Stadium: Estadio Casa Blanca; Attendance: 2,248; Referee: Daniel Salazar
Note: This match was moved up from April 27 due to a date with Liga's Round of 16 match in the Copa Libertadores.

April 23 Round 14	ESPOLI	0–0	LDU Quito	Santo Domingo
15:00 UTC−05:00		Report		Stadium: Estadio Olímpico Municipal Etho Vega; Attendance: 7,140; Referee: Diego Lara

May 1 Round 16	Emelec	1–0	LDU Quito	Guayaquil
15:30 UTC−05:00	Gaibor 72'	Report		Stadium: Estadio George Capwell; Attendance: 16,159; Referee: Samuel Haro

May 8 Round 17	LDU Quito	2–1	El Nacional	Quito
12:00 UTC−05:00	Ganchozo 17'; M. Bolaños 42'	Report	Anangonó 11'	Stadium: Estadio Casa Blanca; Attendance: 5,339; Referee: Carlos Vera

May 11 Round 7	LDU Quito	0–1	Emelec	Quito
19:30 UTC−05:00		Report	Caicedo 84'	Stadium: Estadio Casa Blanca; Attendance: 9,361; Referee: Samuel Haro
Note: The match was postponed, by request, because of Liga's participation in the Copa Libertadores.

May 15 Round 18	Manta	1–1	LDU Quito	Manta
12:00 UTC−05:00	Mera 2'	Report	de la Cruz 45'	Stadium: Estadio Jocay; Attendance: 950; Referee: Daniel Salazar

May 18 Round 19	Independiente del Valle	1–2	LDU Quito	Sangolquí
15:30 UTC−05:00	Samaniego 90+1'	Report	L. Bolaños 1'; W. Calderón 32'	Stadium: Estadio Municipal Rumiñahui; Attendance: 2,479; Referee: Omar Ponce

May 22 Round 20	LDU Quito	2–0	Imbabura	Quito
11:30 UTC−05:00	Mercado 70' (o.g.); M. Bolaños 74'	Report		Stadium: Estadio Casa Blanca; Attendance: 13,985; Referee: Miguel Hidalgo

June 12 Round 21	Barcelona	0–0	LDU Quito	Guayaquil
17:00 UTC−05:00		Report		Stadium: Estadio Monumental Banco Pichincha; Attendance: 8,100; Referee: José Caprio

June 15 Round 11	LDU Quito	0–1	Deportivo Quito	Ibarra
19:00 UTC−05:00		Report	Bevacqua 5'	Stadium: Estadio Olímpico; Attendance: 12,653; Referee: Miguel Hidalgo
Note: This game was postponed at the request of both teams. The match was played in Ibarra since Liga's home stadium was suspended for one match due to objects being thrown on the pitch during the game versus Emelec.

June 19 Round 22	LDU Quito	1–1	Olmedo	Quito
12:00	Barcos 71'	Report	Romero 29'	Stadium: Estadio Casa Blanca; Attendance: 1,016; Referee: Diego Lara

==== Second stage ====
The Second Stage of the season began July 22 and is scheduled to end on December 4.

Pos	Team	Pld	W	D	L	GF	GA	GD	Pts
3	El Nacional	22	11	4	7	40	33	+7	37
4	Emelec	22	10	4	8	34	23	+11	34
5	LDU Quito	22	10	4	8	32	23	+9	34
6	Deportivo Cuenca	22	8	8	6	29	23	+6	32
7	Independiente José Terán	22	9	4	9	32	30	+2	31

Rules for classification: 1) points; 2) goal difference; 3) number of goals scored.

Overall								Home						Away					
Pld	W	D	L	GF	GA	GD	Pts	W	D	L	GF	GA	GD	W	D	L	GF	GA	GD
22	10	4	8	32	23	+9	34	7	2	2	20	6	+14	3	2	6	12	17	−5

July 23 Round 1	Olmedo	2–0	LDU Quito	Riobamba
16:00 UTC−05:00	Ramúa 45'; Gómez 77'	Report		Stadium: Estadio Olímpico; Attendance: 2,785; Referee: Roberto Alman

July 27 Round 2	LDU Quito	1–0	Emelec	Quito
19:45 UTC−05:00	L. Bolaños 64'	Report		Stadium: Estadio Casa Blanca; Attendance: 7,467; Referee: Omar Ponce

July 31 Round 3	Imbabura	0–1	LDU Quito	Ibarra
14:00 UTC−05:00		Report	Acosta 76'	Stadium: Estadio Olímpico; Attendance: 3,412; Referee: José Luis Espinel

August 8 Round 4	LDU Quito	1–2	Independiente del Valle	Quito
19:30 UTC−05:00	Barcos 90+2'	Report	Mina 40', 86'	Stadium: Estadio Casa Blanca; Attendance: 8,640; Referee: Carlos Vera

August 13 Round 5	LDU Quito	6–0	Manta	Quito
19:30 UTC−05:00	González 17'; Barcos 26', 40', 45', 48', 53' (pen.)	Report		Stadium: Estadio Casa Blanca; Attendance: 1,914; Referee: Samuel Haro

August 21 Round 6	El Nacional	2–3	LDU Quito	Quito
12:00 UTC−05:00	Madrid 15'; J. L. Anangonó 68'	Report	Barcos 18', 57' (pen.); Acosta 90+2'	Stadium: Estadio Olímpico Atahualpa; Attendance: 20,904; Referee: Diego Lara

August 24 Round 7	LDU Quito	0–0	Barcelona	Quito
19:30 UTC−05:00		Report		Stadium: Estadio Casa Blanca; Attendance: 21,861; Referee: Carlos Vera

August 28 Round 8	Deportivo Cuenca	2–1	LDU Quito	Cuenca
11:15 UTC−05:00	Castro 33'; Govea 84'	Report	Reasco 50'	Stadium: Estadio Alejandro Serrano Aguilar; Attendance: 7,548; Referee: José Luis Espinel

September 10 Round 9	LDU Quito	1–0	ESPOLI	Quito
19:30 UTC−05:00	González 90+1'	Report		Stadium: Estadio Casa Blanca; Attendance: 17,983; Referee: Roberto Alman

September 17 Round 10	L.D.U. Loja	3–2	LDU Quito	Loja
19:00 UTC−05:00	Fábio Renato 7'; Vaca 28', 57'	Report	Bieler 62' de la Cruz 74'	Stadium: Estadio Federativo Reina del Cisne; Attendance: 8,091; Referee: José Espinel

October 2 Round 12	Deportivo Quito	1–1	LDU Quito	Quito
12:00 UTC−05:00	Checa 11'	Report	González 51'	Stadium: Estadio Olímpico Atahualpa; Attendance: 21,114; Referee: Alfredo Intriago

October 16 Round 13	LDU Quito	3–0	L.D.U. Loja	Quito
11:30 UTC−05:00	Bieler 47'; Acosta 59'; L. Bolaños 84'	Report		Stadium: Estadio Casa Blanca; Attendance: 3,144; Referee: Samuel Haro

October 19 Round 11	LDU Quito	1–0	Deportivo Quito	Quito
19:30	Barcos 66'	Report		Stadium: Estadio Casa Blanca; Attendance: 13,583; Referee: José Carpio
Note: The match was postponed by Liga's request.

October 23 Round 14	ESPOLI	1–0	LDU Quito	Santo Domingo
15:00 UTC−05:00	Guarino 60'	Report		Stadium: Estadio Olímpico Municipal Etho Vega; Attendance: 6,869; Referee: Carlos Vera

October 26 Round 16	Barcelona	2–3	LDU Quito	Guayaquil
19:30 UTC−05:00	Borghello 11'; Caicedo 88'	Report	Barcos 52', 60'; Ambrosi 90+1'	Stadium: Estadio Monumental Banco Pichincha; Attendance: 45,244; Referee: Alfredo Intriago

October 30 Round 15	LDU Quito	4–1	Deportivo Cuenca	Quito
11:30 UTC−05:00	Barcos 23'; Reasco 36'; González 45' de la Cruz 80'	Report	Robles 4'	Stadium: Estadio Casa Blanca; Attendance: 3,413; Referee: Roddy Zambrano

November 7 Round 17	LDU Quito	2–1	El Nacional	Quito
19:30 UTC−05:00	Barcos 37' de la Cruz 85'	Report	Minda 26'	Stadium: Estadio Casa Blanca; Attendance: 3,987; Referee: Omar Ponce

November 20 Round 18	Manta	0–0	LDU Quito	Manta
13:00 UTC−05:00		Report		Stadium: Estadio Jocay; Attendance: 850; Referee: Alfredo Intriago

November 22 Round 19	Independiente del Valle	2–0	LDU Quito	Sangolquí
12:00 UTC−05:00	Solís 9', 48'	Report		Stadium: Estadio Municipal Rumiñahui; Attendance: 1,213; Referee: Miguel Hidalgo

November 27 Round 20	LDU Quito	1–2	Imbabura	Quito
11:00 UTC−05:00	R. Calderón 38'	Report	Mera 31'; Hansen 59'	Stadium: Estadio Casa Blanca; Attendance: 19,259; Referee: Samuel Haro

December 1 Round 21	Emelec	2–1	LDU Quito	Guayaquil
18:00 UTC−05:00	Vigneri 5'; Corozo 60' (o.g.)	Report	W. Calderón 26'	Stadium: Estadio George Capwell; Attendance: 4,810; Referee: Carlos Vera

December 4 Round 22	LDU Quito	0–0	Olmedo	Quito
12:00		Report		Stadium: Estadio Casa Blanca; Attendance: 1,187; Referee: Daniel Salazar

==== Third stage ====
Pos	Team	Pld	W	D	L	GF	GA	GD	Pts
1	El Nacional	2	1	1	0	3	2	+1	4
2	LDU Quito	2	0	1	1	2	3	−1	1

December 11	El Nacional	2–1	LDU Quito	Estadio Olímpico Atahualpa, Quito
12:00 (UTC-5)	Vélez 8'; Chila 39'	Report	W. Calderón 23'	Attendance: 7,550; Referee: Carlos Vera

December 19	LDU Quito	1–1	El Nacional	Estadio Casa Blanca, Quito
19:30 (UTC-5)	L. Bolaños 83'	Report	Anangonó 71'	Attendance: 10,078; Referee: Omar Ponce

=== Copa Libertadores ===
LDU Quito qualified to the 2011 Copa Libertadores—their 15th participation in the continental tournament—as the winner of the 2010 Serie A Second Stage and were given the Ecuador 1 berth as the league champion. They entered the competition in the Second Stage and were placed in Group 8 with Godoy Cruz, Independiente, Peñarol. They won their group and advance to the Round of 16 where they were eliminated by Vélez Sársfield.

Overall								Home						Away					
Pld	W	D	L	GF	GA	GD	Pts	W	D	L	GF	GA	GD	W	D	L	GF	GA	GD
8	3	1	4	12	9	+3	10	3	0	1	10	2	+8	0	1	3	2	7	−5

==== Second stage ====
Pos	Team	Pld	W	D	L	GF	GA	GD	Pts	LDU	PEN	IND	GCR
1	(Ecuador) LDU Quito	6	3	1	2	12	4	+8	10		5–0	3–0	2–0
2	(Uruguay) Peñarol	6	3	0	3	6	11	−5	9	1–0		0–1	2–1
3	(Argentina) Independiente	6	2	2	2	7	8	−1	8	1–1	3–0		1–3
4	(Argentina) Godoy Cruz	6	2	1	3	8	10	−2	7	2–1	1–3	1–1	

Legend: Blue = home team win; Yellow = draw; Red = away team win.

February 17 Second Stage	Godoy Cruz (Argentina)	2–1	(Ecuador) LDU Quito	Mendoza, Argentina
22:15 UTC−03:00	C. Sánchez 16'; N. Sánchez 59'	Report	Reasco 53'	Stadium: Estadio Malvinas Argentinas; Attendance: 19,524; Referee: Martín Vázquez (Uruguay)

March 3 Second Stage	LDU Quito (Ecuador)	3–0	(Argentina) Independiente	Quito, Ecuador
20:30 UTC−05:00	Ambrosi 10'; M. Bolaños 52'; Urrutia 78'	Report		Stadium: Estadio Casa Blanca; Attendance: 13,768; Referee: Óscar Ruiz (Colombia)

March 9 Second Stage	Peñarol (Uruguay)	1–0	(Ecuador) LDU Quito	Montevideo, Uruguay
20:30 UTC−02:00	Aguiar 57'	Report		Stadium: Estadio Centenario; Attendance: 42,455; Referee: Víctor Rivera (Peru)

March 17 Second Stage	LDU Quito (Ecuador)	5–0	(Uruguay) Peñarol	Quito, Ecuador
19:30 UTC−05:00	Luna 22'; W. Calderón 45+1', 78'; Valdez 58' (o.g.); Barcos 63' (pen.)	Report		Stadium: Estadio Casa Blanca; Attendance: 15,329; Referee: Wilmar Roldán (Colombia)
Note: During the match, Carlos Luna scored the 12,000th goal in the history of the Copa Libertadores.

April 5 Second Stage	Independiente (Argentina)	1–1	(Ecuador) LDU Quito	Avellaneda, Argentina
21:15 UTC−03:00	Núñez 23' (pen.)	Report	J. Velázquez 57' (o.g.)	Stadium: Estadio Libertadores de América; Attendance: 13,270; Referee: Carlos Torres (Paraguay)

April 12 Second Stage	LDU Quito (Ecuador)	2–0	(Argentina) Godoy Cruz	Quito, Ecuador
18:15 UTC−05:00	L. Bolaños 47'; Barcos 58'	Report		Stadium: Estadio Casa Blanca; Attendance: 15,516; Referee: Paulo Oliveira (Brazil)

==== Round of 16 ====
April 26 Round of 16	Vélez Sarsfield (Argentina)	3–0	(Ecuador) LDU Quito	Buenos Aires, Argentina
21:50 UTC−03:00	Fernández 7', 10'; Domínguez 54'	Report		Stadium: Estadio José Amalfitani; Attendance: 7,134; Referee: Carlos Amarilla (Paraguay)

May 5 Round of 16	LDU Quito (Ecuador)	0–2	(Argentina) Vélez Sarsfield	Quito, Ecuador
20:45 UTC−05:00		Report	Álvarez 45+10'; Bella 80'	Stadium: Estadio Casa Blanca; Attendance: 19,158; Referee: Wilmar Roldán (Colombia)

Vélez Sársfield won on points 6–0.

=== Copa Sudamericana ===
The 2011 Copa Sudamericana is being played in the second half of the season. Liga entered in the First Stage.

Overall								Home						Away					
Pld	W	D	L	GF	GA	GD	Pts	W	D	L	GF	GA	GD	W	D	L	GF	GA	GD
12	7	1	4	13	8	+5	22	5	0	1	10	2	+8	2	1	3	3	6	−3

==== First stage ====
August 4 First Stage	Yaracuyanos (Venezuela)	1–1	(Ecuador) LDU Quito	San Felipe, Venezuela
19:45 UTC−04:30	Chalar 78'	Report	Barcos 64' (pen.)	Stadium: Estadio Florentino Oropeza; Referee: Georges Buckley (Peru)

August 17 First Stage	LDU Quito (Ecuador)	1–0	(Venezuela) Yaracuyanos	Quito, Ecuador
17:00 UTC−05:00	Vera 19'	Report		Stadium: Estadio Casa Blanca; Referee: Raúl Orosco (Bolivia)

LDU Quito won on points 4–1.

==== Second stage ====
September 13 Second Stage	LDU Quito (Ecuador)	4–1	(Venezuela) Trujillanos	Quito, Ecuador
17:00 UTC−05:00	Barcos 25', 43', 90+1' (pen.); González 87'	Report	Falcón 1'	Stadium: Estadio Casa Blanca; Referee: Víctor Hugo Carrillo (Peru)

September 22 Second Stage	Trujillanos (Venezuela)	0–1	(Ecuador) LDU Quito	Valera, Venezuela
19:00 UTC−04:30		Report	L. Bolaños 30'	Stadium: Estadio José Alberto Pérez; Referee: Darío Ubriaco (Uruguay)

LDU Quito won on points 6–0.

==== Round of 16 ====
September 28 Round of 16	LDU Quito (Ecuador)	2–0	(Argentina) Independiente	Quito, Ecuador
17:15 UTC−05:00	Ambrosi 42'; L. Bolaños 52'	Report		Stadium: Estadio Casa Blanca; Referee: Líber Prudente (Uruguay)

October 12 Round of 16	Independiente (Argentina)	1–0	(Ecuador) LDU Quito	Avellaneda, Argentina
21:15 UTC−03:00	Núñez 45'	Report		Stadium: Estadio Libertadores de América; Referee: José Buitrago (Colombia)

Tied on points 3–3, LDU Quito won on goal difference.

==== Quarterfinals ====
November 3 Quarterfinals	LDU Quito (Ecuador)	1–0	(Paraguay) Libertad	Quito, Ecuador
19:45 UTC−05:00	L. Bolaños 90'	Report		Stadium: Estadio Casa Blanca; Referee: Sergio Pezzotta (Argentina)

November 17 Quarterfinals	Libertad (Paraguay)	1–0 (4–5 p)	(Ecuador) LDU Quito	Asunción, Paraguay
19:15 UTC−03:00	Velázquez 89'	Report		Stadium: Estadio Dr. Nicolás Léoz; Referee: Wilson Seneme (Brazil)
	Penalties
	Aquino (penalty scored); Velázquez (penalty scored); Pouso (penalty scored); Canuto (penalty missed); Medina (penalty scored); Maciel (penalty missed)		(penalty scored) Bieler; (penalty scored) Urrutia; (penalty missed) D. Calderón; (penalty scored) Guagua; (penalty scored) Barcos; (penalty scored) Reasco

Tied on points 3–3, LDU Quito won on penalties.

==== Semifinals ====
November 24 Semifinals	LDU Quito (Ecuador)	2–0	(Argentina) Vélez Sarsfield	Quito, Ecuador
19:15 UTC−05:00	Barcos 48', 83'	Report		Stadium: Estadio Casa Blanca; Referee: Jorge Larrionda (Uruguay)

November 29 Semifinals	Vélez Sarsfield (Argentina)	0–1	(Ecuador) LDU Quito	Buenos Aires, Argentina
21:15 UTC−03:00		Report	Barcos 48'	Stadium: Estadio José Amalfitani; Referee: José Buitrago (Colombia)

LDU Quito won on points 6–0.

==== Finals ====
December 8 Finals	LDU Quito (Ecuador)	0–1	Universidad de Chile	Quito, Ecuador
19:15 UTC−05:00		Report	Vargas 43'	Stadium: Estadio Casa Blanca; Referee: Diego Abal (Argentina)

December 14 Finals	Universidad de Chile	3–0	(Ecuador) LDU Quito	Santiago, Chile
21:15 UTC−03:00	Vargas 2'; Lorenzetti 79'; Vargas 86'	Report		Stadium: Estadio Nacional Julio Martínez Prádanos; Referee: Wilson Seneme (Brazil)

Universidad de Chile won on points.

=== Other friendlies ===
June 4	LDU Quito	1–1	ESPOLI	Quito, Ecuador
10:00 UTC−05:00	M. Bolaños	Report	Penilla	Stadium: Estadio Casa Blanca

== Player statistics ==
Num	Pos	Player	App	Goal	Yellow card	Red card	App	Goal	Yellow card	Red card	App	Goal	Yellow card	Red card	App	Goal	Yellow card	Red card
Num	Pos	Player	Serie A				Copa Libertadores				Copa Sudamericana				Total			
2	DF	Norberto Araujo	19	—	3	—	2	—	—	—	9	—	2	—	30	—	5	—
3	DF	Geovanny Caicedo	30	1	9	—	5	—	—	—	3	—	—	—	38	1	9	—
4	MF	Ulises de la Cruz	32	6	6	—	8	—	2	—	7	—	2	—	47	6	10	—
5	MF	Paúl Ambrosi	22	1	3	—	6	1	—	—	10	1	1	—	38	3	4	—
6	DF	Jorge Guagua	27	—	6	4	8	—	6	1	11	—	2	1	46	—	14	6
7	MF	Miler Bolaños	21	3	2	1	3	1	—	—	6	—	1	—	30	4	3	1
8	MF	Patricio Urrutia	22	—	4	1	7	1	—	—	9	—	3	—	38	1	7	1
9	FW	Walter Calderón	23	7	4	1	4	2	—	—	3	—	—	—	30	9	4	1
10	MF	Luis Bolaños	30	9	2	—	4	1	2	1	9	3	1	—	43	13	5	1
11	FW	Ezequiel González	28	5	7	—	5	—	1	—	11	1	5	—	44	6	13	—
12	DF	Galo Corozo	9	—	1	—	—	—	—	—	1	—	—	—	10	—	1	—
13	DF	Néicer Reasco	38	3	7	1	7	1	2	1	12	—	—	—	57	4	9	2
14	DF	Diego Calderón	37	—	9	1	8	—	1	—	12	—	4	—	57	—	14	1
15	MF	William Araujo	12	—	1	—	5	—	1	—	—	—	—	—	17	—	2	—
16	FW	Hernán Barcos	32	16	7	1	7	2	1	—	12	7	2	—	51	25	10	1
17	MF	Enrique Gámez	7	—	2	—	—	—	—	—	6	—	—	—	13	—	2	—
18	MF	Fernando Hidalgo	41	—	6	—	6	—	—	2	11	—	2	—	58	—	8	2
19	FW	Claudio Bieler	11	2	5	—	—	—	—	—	11	—	—	—	22	2	5	—
20	MF	Enrique Vera	26	—	15	—	8	—	5	—	3	1	1	—	37	1	21	—
21	MF	Lucas Acosta	14	3	1	—	—	—	—	—	6	—	—	—	20	3	1	—
22	GK	Alexander Domínguez	34	—	5	—	8	—	2	—	11	—	2	—	53	—	9	—
23	DF	Argenis Moreira	10	2	5	1	—	—	—	—	—	—	—	—	10	2	5	1
24	DF	José Valencia	17	—	2	—	4	—	—	—	2	—	—	—	23	—	2	—
25	GK	Daniel Viteri	10	—	1	1	—	—	—	—	1	—	—	—	11	—	1	1
50	MF	Richard Calderón	7	1	1	1	—	—	—	—	—	—	—	—	7	1	1	1
51	MF	Ángel Ledesma	3	—	—	—	—	—	—	—	—	—	—	—	3	—	—	—
52	FW	José Pabón	5	—	1	—	—	—	—	—	—	—	—	—	5	—	1	—
53	MF	Sandro Rojas	4	—	1	—	—	—	—	—	—	—	—	—	4	—	1	—
54	MF	Marlon Ganchozo	31	2	5	—	1	—	—	—	—	—	—	—	32	2	5	—
55	MF	José Cevallos Enríquez	10	1	1	—	1	—	—	—	—	—	—	—	11	1	1	—
56	FW	José Gutiérrez	4	—	—	—	—	—	—	—	—	—	—	—	4	—	—	—
57	MF	Raúl Macías	1	—	—	—	—	—	—	—	—	—	—	—	1	—	—	—
58	MF	David Carrera	2	—	—	—	—	—	—	—	—	—	—	—	2	—	—	—
59	DF	John Subía	1	—	—	—	—	—	—	—	—	—	—	—	1	—	—	—
61	MF	David Patiño	1	—	—	—	—	—	—	—	—	—	—	—	1	—	—	—
63	FW	Wellington Cedeño	1	—	—	—	—	—	—	—	—	—	—	—	1	—	—	—
67	DF	Víctor Carcelén	2	—	—	—	—	—	—	—	—	—	—	—	2	—	—	—
68	MF	Luis Carcelén	1	—	—	—	—	—	—	—	—	—	—	—	1	—	—	—
69	FW	Diego Hurtado	1	—	—	—	—	—	—	—	—	—	—	—	1	—	—	—
1	GK	José Francisco Cevallos	4	—	2	—	—	—	—	—	—	—	—	—	4	—	2	—
21	FW	Carlos Luna	7	—	—	—	4	1	1	—	—	—	—	—	11	1	1	—
53	FW	Luis Batioja	4	—	—	—	—	—	—	—	—	—	—	—	4	—	—	—
Totals			—	62	124	13	—	10	24	5	—	13	28	1	—	85	176	19

Updated as of games played on December 19, 2011.
Note: Players in italics left the club mid-season.

== See also ==
- 2011 in Ecuadorian football
