= 2012 Liga Deportiva Universitaria de Quito season =

LDU Quito
2012 season
- President: Carlos Arroyo
- Manager: Edgardo Bauza
- Stadium: Estadio Casa Blanca
- Serie A: First Stage: 6th Second Stage: 3rd Aggregate: 3rd Overall: 3rd
- Top goalscorer: League: Claudio Bieler (20 goals); All: Claudio Bieler (20 goals)
- Highest home attendance: 20,517; (April 29 v. Barcelona)
- Lowest home attendance: 1,326; (July 7 v. Manta)
- Average home league attendance: 8,340
Home colours	Away colours

Liga Deportiva Universitaria de Quito's 2012 season will be the club's 82nd year of existence, the 59th year in professional football, and the 51st in the top level of professional football in Ecuador.

== Club ==
=== Personnel ===
President: Carlos Arroyo
Honorary President: Rodrigo Paz
President of the Executive Commission: Esteban Paz
President of the Football Commission: Edwin Ripalda
Vice-President of the Football Commission: Patricio Torres
Sporting manager: Santiago Jácome

=== Coaching staff ===
Manager: Edgardo Bauza
Assistant manager: José Daniel Di Leo
Physical trainer: Bruno Militano
Goalkeeper trainer: Gustavo Flores
Statistician: Maximiliano Bauza

=== Kits ===
Supplier: Umbro
Sponsor(s): Diners Club International, Chevrolet, Coca-Cola, Discover

== Squad information ==
Liga's squad for the season is allowed a maximum of four foreign players at any one time, and a maximum of eight throughout the season. At the start of the season, Liga was mandated to start one under-19 player in each match. The jersey numbers in the main table (directly below) refer to the number on their domestic league jersey. The under-19 players will wear a jersey number of at least #50. For each CONMEBOL competition, Liga must register 25 players, whose jerseys will be numbered 1–25. Because of this, some players may have different jersey numbers while playing in CONMEBOL matches.

N	Pos	Nat.	Player	Age	Since	App	Goals	Notes
2	DF	ECU	Norberto Araujo (captain)	33	2007	139	0	
3	DF	ECU	Luis Luna	24	2012	0	0	
4	MF	ECU	Ulises de la Cruz (vice-captain)	37	2009	217	32	Previously with the club from '97–'99 and '00
5	MF	ECU	Paúl Ambrosi	31	2010	361	36	Previously with the club from '00–'09
6	DF	ARG	Ezequiel Luna	25	2012	0	0	
7	MF	ECU	Ángel Cheme	30	2009	45	2	Previously called Gonzalo Chila
8	MF	ECU	Patricio Urrutia (3rd captain)	32	2010	277	43	Previously with the club from '03–'09
10	FW	ECU	Joao Plata	20	2012	7	1	Previously with the club in '10
11	MF	ECU	Édison Méndez	32	2012	83	12	Previously with the club from '05–'06 and '09–'10
12	DF	ECU	Galo Corozo	21	2009	13	0	
13	DF	ECU	Néicer Reasco	34	2008	434	33	Previously with the club from '97–'00 and '01–'06
14	DF	ECU	Diego Calderón	25	2007	167	3	Previously with the club in '05
15	MF	ECU	Cristhian Hurtado	21	2012	2	0	Previously with the club from '08–'10
16	FW	ECU	Claudio Bieler	27	2011	74	37	Previously with the club from '08–'09
17	MF	PAR	Eduardo Echeverría	23	2012	0	0	
18	MF	ECU	Fernando Hidalgo	26	2011	41	0	
19	MF	ARG	Pablo Vitti	27	2012	0	0	
22	GK	ECU	Alexander Domínguez	24	2006	130	0	
23	DF	ECU	Elvis Bone	28	2012	0	0	
24	MF	ECU	José Pabón	21	2010	6	0	
25	GK	ECU	Daniel Viteri	30	2011	20	0	Previously with the club from '08–'09
37	FW	ARG	Ariel Nahuelpan	24	2012	0	0	
50	FW	ECU	José Gutiérrez	18	2011	4	0	U-19 player
51	FW	ECU	Marco Nazareno	19	2012	0	0	U-19 player
51	MF	ECU	Gabriel Corozo	17	2012	0	0	U-19 player
52	FW	ECU	Diego Hurtado	16	2011	1	0	U-19 player
53	MF	ECU	Sandro Rojas	18	2011	4	0	U-19 player
54	FW	ECU	Kevin Mercado	16	2011	0	0	U-19 player
55	MF	ECU	José Cevallos Enríquez	16	2011	10	1	U-19 player
60	GK	ECU	Walter Chávez	17	2011	0	0	U-19 player

Note: Caps and goals are of the national league and are current as of the beginning of the season.

=== Winter transfers ===
In a press conference on December 20, 2011, Liga de Quito announced the signings of veteran midfielder Édison Méndez of Emelec and season-long loan of Elvis Bone from Olmedo. In the same press conference, Liga announced that Argentine midfielders Ezequiel González and Lucas Acosta would not continue with the team, and that Argenis Moreira was signed by Ambato-based club Técnico Universitario. The next day it was announced that Técnico also signed midfielder William Araujo on a one-year contract. On January 4, 2011, Liga de Quito announced in a press conference the signing of Ecuadorian midfielder David Quiroz (season-long loan from Atlante). The next day, January 5, 2011, Argentinean defender Ezequiel Luna confirmed that he will be playing for Liga during the 2012 season.

Players In
Name	Nat	Pos	Age	Moving from
Édison Méndez	ECU	MF	32	Emelec
David Quiroz	ECU	MF	29	Atlante (MEX) (loan)
Elvis Bone	ECU	DF	28	Olmedo (loan)
Ezequiel Luna	ARG	DF	25	Tenerife (ESP) (loan)
Damián Manso	ARG	MF	32	Morelia (MEX)
Ariel Nahuelpan	ARG	FW	24	Racing de Santander (ESP)
Diego Hurtado	ECU	FW	16	Promoted from youth squad

Players Out
Name	Nat	Pos	Age	Moving to
Ezequiel González	ARG	MF	31	Released
Lucas Acosta	ARG	MF	24	Released
Argenis Moreira	ECU	DF	24	Técnico Universitario
William Araujo	ECU	MF	32	Técnico Universitario
Hernán Barcos	ARG	FW	27	Palmeiras (BRA)
Walter Calderón	ECU	FW	34	Liga de Loja
Miller Bolaños	ECU	MF	21	Chivas USA (USA)
Jorge Guagua	ECU	DF	30	Atlante (MEX)
Marlon Ganchozo	ECU	DF	20	Rocafuerte
José Valencia	ECU	DF	29	Released
Geovanny Caicedo	ECU	DF	30	Deportivo Cuenca

=== Summer transfers ===
On June 1, 2012, the club announced that Luis Bolaños was loaned to Club Atlas. On June 25, the club hired Eduardo Echeverría to be the new foreign player of the team. Forward Joao Plata returned to the club after a year-and-a-half on a loan from Toronto FC.

Players In
Name	Nat	Pos	Age	Moving from
Eduardo Echeverría	PAR	MF	23	Club Sportivo Carapeguá (PAR)
Joao Plata	ECU	FW	20	Toronto FC (CAN) (loan)
Luis Luna	ECU	DF	24	Imbabura (ECU)
Pablo Vitti	ARG	MF	27	Querétaro (MEX)

Players Out
Name	Nat	Pos	Age	Moving to
Luis Bolaños	ECU	MF	27	Club Atlas (MEX) (loan)
Damián Manso	ARG	MF	33	
Enrique Gámez	ECU	MF	30	

== Competitions ==
=== Pre-season friendlies ===
January 21 La Noche Blanca	LDU Quito (Ecuador)	3–1	(Colombia) Atlético Nacional	Quito
19:00 UTC−05:00	D. Hurtado 40'; Bolaños 52'; Hidalgo 77'	Report	Rentería 90+1' (pen.)	Stadium: Estadio Casa Blanca; Referee: Diego Lara

January 25	Atlético Nacional (Colombia)	2–0	(Ecuador) LDU Quito	Medellín
20:00 UTC−05:00	Pabón 22', 68'	Report		Stadium: Estadio Atanasio Girardot

January 28	Deportivo Quito	1–1	LDU Quito	Quito
19:00 UTC−05:00	Saritama		D. Hurtado	Stadium: Estadio Olímpico Atahualpa

=== Serie A ===
The 2012 season is Liga's 51st season in the Serie A and their eleventh consecutive. The league season will run from early February to early December. The format is identical to the previous season.

==== First stage ====
The First Stage of the season ran from February 5 to July 7. Liga finished 6th and failed to qualify to the Finals, 2012 Copa Sudamericana, 2013 Copa Libertadores and 2013 Copa Sudamericana during this stage.

Pos	Team	Pld	W	D	L	GF	GA	GD	Pts
4	Independiente José Terán	22	10	7	5	29	20	+9	37
5	Deportivo Cuenca	22	11	3	8	24	26	−2	36
6	LDU Quito	22	8	10	4	32	22	+10	34
7	Deportivo Quito	22	8	7	7	34	23	+11	31
8	El Nacional	22	8	5	9	24	34	−10	29

Overall								Home						Away					
Pld	W	D	L	GF	GA	GD	Pts	W	D	L	GF	GA	GD	W	D	L	GF	GA	GD
22	8	10	4	32	22	+10	34	6	4	1	23	10	+13	2	6	3	9	12	−3

February 5 Round 1	Manta	0–1	LDU Quito	Portoviejo
15:00 UTC−05:00		Report	Bieler 61'	Stadium: Estadio Reales Tamarindos; Attendance: 753; Referee: José Luis Espinel

February 12 Round 2	LDU Quito	5–0	Olmedo	Quito
11:00 UTC−05:00	Cevallos 11'; Hidalgo 23'; Bieler 45', 65', 68'	Report		Stadium: Estadio Casa Blanca; Attendance: 5,462; Referee: Roberto Alman

February 26 Round 3	Deportivo Quito	1–1	LDU Quito	Quito
11:30 UTC−05:00	Alustiza 21'	Report	Bieler 52'	Stadium: Estadio Olímpico Atahualpa; Attendance: 16,695; Referee: Alfredo Intriago

March 4 Round 5	LDU Quito	2–0	Emelec	Quito
11:30 UTC−05:00	Cevallos 55'; Nahuelpan 59'	Report		Stadium: Estadio Casa Blanca; Attendance: 17,456; Referee: José Luis Espinel

March 11 Round 6	Técnico Universitario	1–1	LDU Quito	Ambato
12:00 UTC−05:00	Colón 90+2'	Report	Bieler 39'	Stadium: Estadio Bellavista; Attendance: 17,496; Referee: Miguel Hidalgo

March 18 Round 7	LDU Quito	1–2	Deportivo Cuenca	Quito
11:30 UTC−05:00	Méndez 57'	Report	Angulo 46'; López 54'	Stadium: Estadio Olímpico Atahualpa; Attendance: 6,856; Referee: Carlos Vera
Note: The match was played in the Estadio Olímpico Atahualpa, because LDU Quito's stadium was suspended for three matches.

March 23 Round 8	LDU Loja	1–0	LDU Quito	Loja
19:30 UTC−05:00	Quiñonez 90'	Report		Stadium: Estadio Federativo Reina del Cisne; Attendance: 10,262; Referee: Robinson Galarza

March 28 Round 4	LDU Quito	1–1	Independiente José Terán	Quito
19:30 UTC−05:00	Nahuelpan 84'	Report	Angulo 90+3'	Stadium: Estadio Olímpico Atahualpa; Attendance: 4,118; Referee: Omar Ponce
Note: The match was postponed, because the referees strike. The match was played in the Estadio Olímpico Atahualpa, because LDU Quito's stadium was suspended for three matches.

March 31 Round 9	LDU Quito	3–2	El Nacional	Quito
19:00 UTC−05:00	Bieler 7', 39', 79'	Report	Madrid 23'; Preciado 25'	Stadium: Estadio Olímpico Atahualpa; Attendance: 7,155; Referee: Samuel Haro
Note: The match was played in the Estadio Olímpico Atahualpa, because LDU Quito's stadium was suspended for three matches.

April 8 Round 10	Barcelona	1–1	LDU Quito	Guayaquil
16:30 UTC−05:00	Mina 2'	Report	Bieler 89'	Stadium: Estadio Monumental Banco Pichincha; Attendance: 40,417; Referee: Carlos Vera

April 15 Round 11	LDU Quito	3–0	Macará	Quito
11:30 UTC−05:00	Cevallos 15'; Bieler 21'; Bolaños 74'	Report		Stadium: Estadio Casa Blanca; Attendance: 6,702; Referee: Roberto Alman

April 22 Round 12	Macará	0–2	LDU Quito	Ambato
12:30 UTC−05:00		Report	Bieler 33'; Manso 71'	Stadium: Estadio Bellavista; Attendance: 7,478; Referee: Diego Lara

April 29 Round 13	LDU Quito	2–2	Barcelona	Quito
11:30 UTC−05:00	Cevallos 16'; Calderón 57'	Report	Mina 45'; Erazo 60'	Stadium: Estadio Casa Blanca; Attendance: 20,517; Referee: José Luis Espinel

May 6 Round 14	El Nacional	1–1	LDU Quito	Quito
12:00 UTC−05:00	Preciado 6'	Report	Bieler 90+3'	Stadium: Estadio Olímpico Atahualpa; Attendance: 10,592; Referee: Omar Ponce

May 12 Round 15	LDU Quito	2–2	LDU Loja	Quito
17:30 UTC−05:00	Nahuelpan 58'; Bieler 86'	Report	Fábio Renato 14'; Feraud 44'	Stadium: Estadio Casa Blanca; Attendance: 19,010; Referee: Miguel Hidalgo

May 18 Round 16	Deportivo Cuenca	0–0	LDU Quito	Cuenca
20:00 UTC−05:00		Report		Stadium: Estadio Alejandro Serrano Aguilar; Attendance: 8,523; Referee: Carlos Orbe

May 23 Round 18	Emelec	3–0	LDU Quito	Guayaquil
20:00 UTC−05:00	de Jesús 15'; Valencia 32'; Giménez 90+1'	Report		Stadium: Estadio George Capwell; Attendance: 7,167; Referee: Carlos Vera

June 13 Round 17	LDU Quito	2–1	Técnico Universitario	Quito
19:30 UTC−05:00	Cevallos 25'; Bieler 74'	Report	Luis Santana 22'	Stadium: Estadio Casa Blanca; Attendance: 2,952; Referee: Roddy Zambrano
Note: The match was originally scheduled for May 20, but was postponed because the referees strike.

June 17 Round 19	Independiente José Terán	2–2	LDU Quito	Sangolquí
12:15 UTC−05:00	Concistre 39', 66'	Report	Nahuelpan 50'; Bieler 72'	Stadium: Estadio Rumiñahui; Attendance: 3,602; Referee: Omar Ponce

June 24 Round 20	LDU Quito	0–0	Deportivo Quito	Quito
11:30 UTC−05:00		Report		Stadium: Estadio Casa Blanca; Attendance: 8,863; Referee: José Luis Espinel

July 1 Round 21	Olmedo	2–0	LDU Quito	Riobamba
12:00 UTC−05:00	Murillo 20'; Prieto 25'	Report		Stadium: Estadio Olímpico de Riobamba; Attendance: 5,919; Referee: Miguel Hidalgo

July 7 Round 22	LDU Quito	2–0	Manta	Quito
17:00 UTC−05:00	Nahuelpan 32'; Cevallos 45+1'	Report		Stadium: Estadio Casa Blanca; Attendance: 1,326; Referee: Robinson Galarza

==== Second stage ====
The Second Stage of the season ran from July 14 to December 2. Liga finished 3rd and qualified to 2013 Copa Libertadores during this stage.

Pos	Team	Pld	W	D	L	GF	GA	GD	Pts	Qualification
1	Barcelona	22	13	6	3	42	19	+23	45	2013 Copa Libertadores Second Stage and 2013 Copa Sudamericana First Stage
2	Emelec	22	11	4	7	28	26	+2	37	
3	LDU Quito	22	9	8	5	26	20	+6	35	
4	Independiente José Terán	22	9	4	9	22	25	−3	31	
5	Técnico Universitario	22	8	7	7	27	34	−7	31	

Overall								Home						Away					
Pld	W	D	L	GF	GA	GD	Pts	W	D	L	GF	GA	GD	W	D	L	GF	GA	GD
22	9	8	5	26	20	+6	35	5	4	2	16	11	+5	4	4	3	10	9	+1

July 14 Round 1	Manta	1–2	LDU Quito	Manta
15:00 UTC−05:00	Garcés 36'	Report	Nahuelpan 77'; Cheme 83'	Stadium: Estadio Jocay; Attendance: 351; Referee: Carlos Orbe

July 21 Round 2	LDU Quito	0–0	Olmedo	Quito
17:30 UTC−05:00		Report		Stadium: Estadio Casa Blanca; Attendance: 4,325; Referee: Daniel Salazar

July 25 Round 3	Deportivo Quito	0–0	LDU Quito	Quito
19:15 UTC−05:00		Report		Stadium: Estadio Olímpico Atahualpa; Attendance: 10,408; Referee: Diego Lara

July 29 Round 4	LDU Quito	1–0	Independiente José Terán	Quito
11:30 UTC−05:00	Reasco 68'	Report		Stadium: Estadio Casa Blanca; Attendance: 2,931; Referee: Omar Ponce

August 5 Round 5	LDU Quito	2–2	Barcelona	Quito
11:30 UTC−05:00	Bieler 59', 90+3'	Report	Díaz 57', 80'	Stadium: Estadio Casa Blanca; Attendance: 17,725; Referee: Carlos Vera

August 11 Round 6	Técnico Universitario	0–0	LDU Quito	Ambato
16:00 UTC−05:00		Report		Stadium: Estadio Bellavista; Attendance: 6,457; Referee: Alfredo Intriago

August 18 Round 7	LDU Quito	0–2	Deportivo Cuenca	Quito
19:30 UTC−05:00		Report	Domingo 4'; Castillo 20'	Stadium: Estadio Casa Blanca; Attendance: 16,043; Referee: José Luis Espinel

August 24 Round 8	LDU Loja	1–2	LDU Quito	Loja
19:30 UTC−05:00	Calderón 40'	Report	Vitti 28'; Echeverría 80'	Stadium: Estadio Federativo Reina del Cisne; Attendance: 8,170; Referee: Edgar Hinostroza

August 29 Round 9	LDU Quito	3–1	El Nacional	Quito
19:30 UTC−05:00	de la Cruz 26'; Vitti 61'; Nahuelpan 80'	Report	Anangonó 31'	Stadium: Estadio Casa Blanca; Attendance: 8,558; Referee: Omar Ponce

September 15 Round 10	Emelec	2–2	LDU Quito	Guayaquil
13:00 UTC−05:00	Figueroa 28'; Gaibor 90+5'	Report	Cevallos 38'; Nahuelpan 54'	Stadium: Estadio George Capwell; Attendance: 7,131; Referee: Roddy Zambrano

September 19 Round 11	LDU Quito	1–2	Macará	Quito
19:30 UTC−05:00	Echeverría 27'	Report	Martínez 60'; Pirchio 90+1'	Stadium: Estadio Casa Blanca; Attendance: 3,376; Referee: Roberto Alman

September 23 Round 12	Macará	0–2	LDU Quito	Ambato
12:00 UTC−05:00		Report	Nahuelpan 67'; Vitti 81'	Stadium: Estadio Bellavista; Attendance: 7,537; Referee: Omar Ponce

September 28 Round 13	LDU Quito	1–0	Emelec	Quito
19:30 UTC−05:00	Plata 87'	Report		Stadium: Estadio Casa Blanca; Attendance: 9,289; Referee: Diego Lara

October 3 Round 14	El Nacional	0–0	LDU Quito	Quito
18:00 UTC−05:00		Report		Stadium: Estadio Olímpico Atahualpa; Attendance: 5,555; Referee: Daniel Salazar

October 19 Round 15	LDU Quito	2–2	LDU Loja	Quito
19:30 UTC−05:00	Fábio Renato 5', 26'	Report	Bieler 54' de la Cruz 82'	Stadium: Estadio Casa Blanca; Attendance: 3,159; Referee: Robinson Galarza

October 26 Round 16	Deportivo Cuenca	3–1	LDU Quito	Cuenca
20:00 UTC−05:00	Cano 32', 48'; Vázquez 65'	Report	Nahuelpan 70'	Stadium: Estadio Alejandro Serrano Aguilar; Attendance: 5,856; Referee: Diego Lara

November 4 Round 17	LDU Quito	2–2	Técnico Universitario	Quito
11:30 UTC−05:00	Nahuelpan 15'; Reasco 72'	Report	Arraya 35'; Cevallos 83'	Stadium: Estadio Casa Blanca; Attendance: 4,424; Referee: Miguel Hidalgo

November 11 Round 18	Barcelona	1–0	LDU Quito	Guayaquil
17:00 UTC−05:00	Ayoví 45+1'	Report		Stadium: Estadio Monumental Banco Pichincha; Attendance: 28,539; Referee: Daniel Salazar

November 18 Round 19	Independiente José Terán	1–0	LDU Quito	Sangolquí
12:15 UTC−05:00	Angulo 58'	Report		Stadium: Estadio Rumiñahui; Attendance: 3,076; Referee: Diego Lara

November 21 Round 20	LDU Quito	3–0	Deportivo Quito	Quito
19:15 UTC−05:00	Bieler 45'; Hidalgo 48'; Vitti 77'	Report		Stadium: Estadio Casa Blanca; Attendance: 2,940; Referee: Daniel Salazar

November 25 Round 21	Olmedo	0–1	LDU Quito	Riobamba
12:00 UTC−05:00		Report	Vitti 36'	Stadium: Estadio Olímpico de Riobamba; Attendance: 2,511; Referee: Alfredo Intriago

December 2 Round 22	LDU Quito	1–0	Manta	Quito
12:00 UTC−05:00	Cevallos 35'	Report		Stadium: Estadio Casa Blanca; Attendance: 4,176; Referee: Roddy Zambrano

==== Third stage ====
Pos	Team	Pld	W	D	L	GF	GA	GD	Pts
1	Emelec	2	2	0	0	3	1	+2	6
2	LDU Quito	2	0	0	2	1	3	−2	0

December 9	LDU Quito	1–2	Emelec	Quito
11:30 UTC−05:00	Vitti 45+1'	Report	de Jesús 31'; Mondaini 67'	Stadium: Estadio Casa Blanca; Attendance: 14,466; Referee: Omar Ponce

December 16	Emelec	1–0	LDU Quito	Guayaquil
17:00 UTC−05:00	de Jesús 78'	Report		Stadium: Estadio George Capwell; Attendance: 13,243; Referee: José Luis Espinel

== Player statistics ==
Num	Pos	Player	App	Goal	Yellow card	Red card	App	Goal	Yellow card	Red card
Num	Pos	Player	Serie A				Total			
2	DF	Norberto Araujo	35	—	9	1	35	—	9	1
3	DF	Luis Luna	5	—	1	—	5	—	1	—
4	MF	Ulises de la Cruz	28	2	2	—	28	2	2	—
5	MF	Paúl Ambrosi	6	—	1	—	6	—	1	—
6	DF	Ezequiel Luna	26	—	9	3	26	—	9	3
7	MF	Ángel Cheme	27	1	2	—	27	1	2	—
8	MF	Patricio Urrutia	28	—	4	1	28	—	4	1
10	FW	Joao Plata	13	1	1	—	13	1	1	—
11	FW	Édison Méndez	19	1	7	—	19	1	7	—
12	DF	Galo Corozo	8	—	2	—	8	—	2	—
13	DF	Néicer Reasco	40	2	7	—	40	2	7	—
14	DF	Diego Calderón	43	1	9	1	43	1	9	1
15	MF	Cristhian Hurtado	7	—	—	1	7	—	—	1
16	FW	Claudio Bieler	36	20	9	1	36	20	9	1
17	MF	Eduardo Echeverría	19	2	3	1	19	2	3	1
18	MF	Fernando Hidalgo	45	2	9	—	45	2	9	—
19	MF	Pablo Vitti	18	6	1	—	18	6	1	—
22	GK	Alexander Domínguez	45	—	4	—	45	—	4	—
23	DF	Elvis Bone	26	—	8	1	26	—	8	1
24	MF	José Pabón	7	—	—	—	7	—	—	—
25	GK	Daniel Viteri	1	—	1	—	1	—	1	—
37	FW	Ariel Nahuelpan	41	11	10	—	41	11	10	—
50	FW	José Gutiérrez	4	—	—	—	4	—	—	—
51	FW	Marco Nazareno	1	—	—	—	1	—	—	—
51	MF	Gabriel Corozo	4	—	—	—	4	—	—	—
52	FW	Diego Hurtado	3	—	—	—	3	—	—	—
53	MF	Sandro Rojas	7	—	1	—	7	—	1	—
54	FW	Kevin Mercado	5	—	—	—	5	—	—	—
55	MF	José Cevallos Enríquez	35	8	4	—	35	8	4	—
60	GK	Walter Chávez	—	—	—	—	—	—	—	—
7	MF	David Quiroz	13	—	1	—	13	—	1	—
10	MF	Luis Bolaños	11	1	1	—	11	1	1	—
17	MF	Enrique Gámez	8	—	1	—	8	—	1	—
20	MF	Enrique Vera *	5	—	2	—	5	—	2	—
21	MF	Damián Manso	19	1	1	—	19	1	1	—
Totals			—	59	110	10	—	59	110	10

Last updated: December 16, 2012.
Note 1: Players in italics left the club mid-season.
* Knee injury ended Vera’s season.
