= 2011 Copa Sudamericana finals =

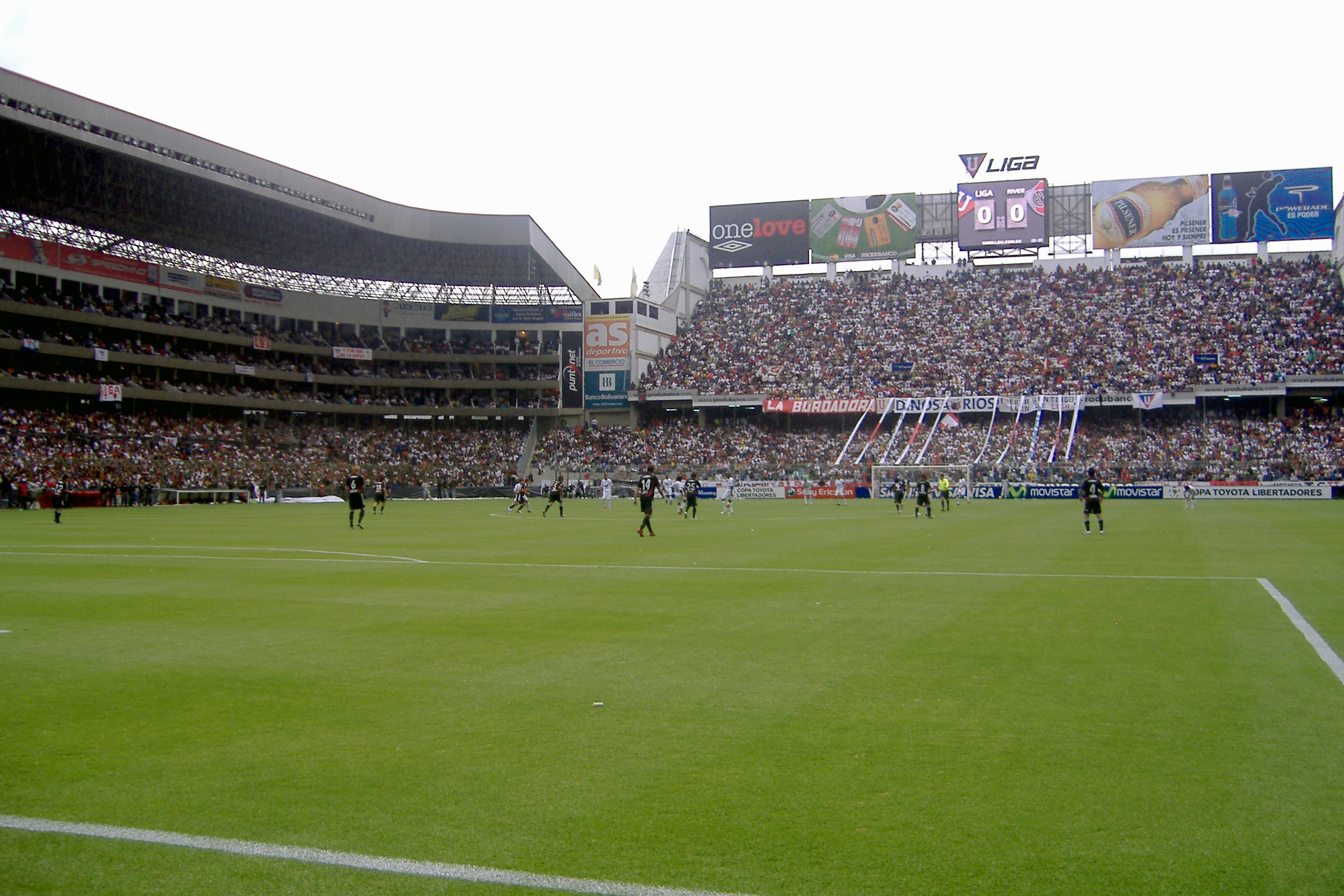
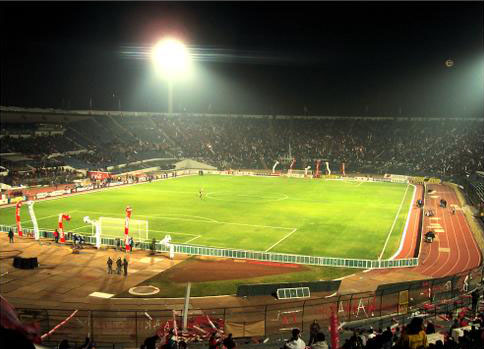
- Event: 2011 Copa Bridgestone Sudamericana de Clubes
LDU Quito	Universidad de Chile
(Ecuador)	(Chile)
0	4
- on aggregate

First leg
LDU Quito	Universidad de Chile
0	1
- Date: 8 December 2011
- Venue: Estadio Casa Blanca, Quito
- Referee: Diego Abal (Argentina)
- Attendance: 41,000

Second Leg
Universidad de Chile	LDU Quito
3	0
- Date: 14 December 2011
- Venue: Estadio Nacional Julio Martínez Prádanos, Santiago
- Referee: Wilson Seneme (Brazil)
- Attendance: 50,000

The 2011 Copa Sudamericana finals were the final two-legged tie that decided the winner of the 2011 Copa Sudamericana, the 10th edition of the Copa Sudamericana, South America's secondary international club football tournament organized by CONMEBOL. The matches were played on 8 and 14 December 2011 between Chilean club Universidad de Chile and Ecuadorian club LDU Quito.

Universidad de Chile won the first leg 1–0 and the second leg 3–0, and won their first Copa Sudamericana and also their first international trophy. As the winner, they earned the right to play in the 2012 Recopa Sudamericana against the winner of the 2011 Copa Libertadores, and the 2012 Suruga Bank Championship against the winner of the 2011 J. League Cup, Kashima Antlers.

== Qualified teams ==
Team	Previous finals appearances (bold indicates winners)
(Ecuador) LDU Quito	**2009**
Universidad de Chile	None

== Road to the finals ==
Universidad de Chile			Round	(Ecuador) LDU Quito		
Opponent	Venue	Score		Opponent	Venue	Score
(Uruguay) Fénix	Home	1–0	First stage	(Venezuela) Yaracuyanos	Away	1–1
(Uruguay) Fénix	Away	0–0	First stage	(Venezuela) Yaracuyanos	Home	1–0
(Uruguay) Nacional	Home	1–0	Second stage	(Venezuela) Trujillanos	Home	4–1
(Uruguay) Nacional	Away	0–2	Second stage	(Venezuela) Trujillanos	Away	0–1
(Brazil) Flamengo	Away	0–4	Round of 16	(Argentina) Independiente	Home	2–0
(Brazil) Flamengo	Home	1–0	Round of 16	(Argentina) Independiente	Away	1–0
(Argentina) Arsenal	Away	1–2	Quarter-finals	(Paraguay) Libertad	Home	1–0
(Argentina) Arsenal	Home	3–0	Quarter-finals	(Paraguay) Libertad	Away	1–0 (4–5 p)
(Brazil) Vasco da Gama	Away	1–1	Semi-finals	(Argentina) Vélez Sársfield	Home	2–0
(Brazil) Vasco da Gama	Home	2–0	Semi-finals	(Argentina) Vélez Sársfield	Away	0–1

== Rules ==
The final is played over two legs; home and away. The higher seeded team plays the second leg at home. The team that accumulates the most points —three for a win, one for a draw, zero for a loss— after the two legs is crowned the champion. Should the two teams be tied on points after the second leg, the team with the best goal difference wins. If the two teams have equal goal difference, the away goals rule is not applied, unlike the rest of the tournament. Extra time is played, which consists of two 15-minute halves. If the tie is still not broken, a penalty shootout ensues according to the Laws of the Game.

== Matches ==
=== First leg ===
8 December 2011
19:15 UTC−05:00

LDU Quito (Ecuador)	0–1	Universidad de Chile
	Report	E. Vargas 43'

Estadio Casa Blanca, Quito
Attendance: 41,000
Referee: Diego Abal (Argentina)

**LDU Quito**	**Universidad de Chile**

GK	22	(Ecuador) Alexander Domínguez
CB	6	(Ecuador) Jorge Guagua
CB	2	(Ecuador) Norberto Araujo
CB	14	(Ecuador) Diego Calderón	(yellow card) 54'
RM	13	(Ecuador) Néicer Reasco (c)		(substituted off) 81'
CM	18	(Ecuador) Fernando Hidalgo
CM	21	(Argentina) Lucas Acosta
LM	5	(Ecuador) Paúl Ambrosi
AM	11	(Argentina) Ezequiel González	(yellow card) 77'
FW	16	(Argentina) Hernán Barcos
FW	19	(Argentina) Claudio Bieler		(substituted off) 46'
Substitutes:
GK	25	(Ecuador) Daniel Viteri
DF	3	(Ecuador) Geovanny Caicedo
MF	17	(Ecuador) Enrique Gámez		(substituted on) 81'
DF	24	(Ecuador) José Valencia
DF	12	(Ecuador) Galo Corozo
MF	10	(Ecuador) Luis Bolaños		(substituted on) 46'
FW	9	(Ecuador) Walter Calderón
Manager:
(Argentina) Edgardo Bauza

GK	25	(Chile) Johnny Herrera	(yellow card) 87'
CB	4	(Chile) Osvaldo González
CB	2	(Chile) Marcos González
CB	13	(Chile) José Manuel Rojas (c)
DM	5	(Chile) Albert Acevedo
RM	6	(Argentina) Matías Rodríguez
CM	20	(Chile) Charles Aránguiz		(substituted off) 88'
CM	21	(Chile) Marcelo Díaz
LM	3	(Chile) Eugenio Mena
FW	17	(Chile) Eduardo Vargas	(yellow card) 51'	(substituted off) 90+1'
FW	19	(Chile) Gustavo Canales	(yellow card) 57'	(substituted off) 73'
Substitutes:
GK	1	(Uruguay) Esteban Conde
DF	14	(Chile) Paulo Magalhaes		(substituted on) 90+1'
DF	23	(Chile) Juan Abarca
MF	15	(Argentina) Guillermo Marino		(substituted on) 88'
MF	22	(Argentina) Gustavo Lorenzetti
FW	16	(Chile) Francisco Castro		(substituted on) 73'
FW	7	(Argentina) Diego Rivarola
Manager:
(Argentina) Jorge Sampaoli

Linesmen:
Hernán Maidana (Argentina)
Diego Bonfá (Argentina)
Fourth official:
Néstor Pitana (Argentina)

=== Second leg ===
14 December 2011
21:15 UTC−03:00

Universidad de Chile	3–0	(Ecuador) LDU Quito
E. Vargas 2', 86'; Lorenzetti 79'	Report

Estadio Nacional Julio Martínez Prádanos, Santiago
Attendance: 50,000
Referee: Wilson Seneme (Brazil)

**Universidad de Chile**	**LDU Quito**

GK	25	(Chile) Johnny Herrera
CB	4	(Chile) Osvaldo González	(yellow card) 57'
CB	2	(Chile) Marcos González
CB	13	(Chile) José Manuel Rojas (c)
RM	6	(Argentina) Matías Rodríguez	(yellow card) 64' (red card) 85'
CM	20	(Chile) Charles Aránguiz
CM	21	(Chile) Marcelo Díaz	(yellow card) 30'
LM	3	(Chile) Eugenio Mena
RW	17	(Chile) Eduardo Vargas
LW	16	(Chile) Francisco Castro		(substituted off) 53'
CF	19	(Chile) Gustavo Canales		(substituted off) 86'
Substitutes:
GK	1	(Uruguay) Esteban Conde
DF	5	(Chile) Albert Acevedo
DF	14	(Chile) Paulo Magalhaes
MF	15	(Argentina) Guillermo Marino
MF	22	(Argentina) Gustavo Lorenzetti		(substituted on) 53'
MF	11	(Chile) Felipe Gallegos
FW	7	(Argentina) Diego Rivarola		(substituted on) 86'
Manager:
(Argentina) Jorge Sampaoli

GK	22	(Ecuador) Alexander Domínguez
RWB	13	(Ecuador) Néicer Reasco (c)		(substituted off) 53'
CB	6	(Ecuador) Jorge Guagua	(red card) 67'
CB	2	(Ecuador) Norberto Araujo
CB	14	(Ecuador) Diego Calderón
LWB	5	(Ecuador) Paúl Ambrosi
CM	21	(Argentina) Lucas Acosta
CM	18	(Ecuador) Fernando Hidalgo	(yellow card) 9'
AM	11	(Argentina) Ezequiel González	(yellow card) 39'
SS	10	(Ecuador) Luis Bolaños		(substituted off) 73'
CF	16	(Argentina) Hernán Barcos	(yellow card) 26'
Substitutes:
GK	25	(Ecuador) Daniel Viteri
DF	3	(Ecuador) Geovanny Caicedo
DF	23	(Ecuador) Argenis Moreira
MF	17	(Ecuador) Enrique Gámez		(substituted on) 53'
MF	15	(Ecuador) William Araujo
MF	20	(Ecuador) José Francisco Cevallos, Jr.
FW	9	(Ecuador) Walter Calderón		(substituted on) 73'
Manager:
(Argentina) Edgardo Bauza

Linesmen:
Alessandro Rocha (Brazil)
Emerson de Carvalho (Brazil)
Fourth official:
Leandro Vuaden (Brazil)

== See also ==
- 2012 Recopa Sudamericana
- 2012 Suruga Bank Championship
