= Luis Luna =

Luis Luna may refer to:

- Luis Luna (footballer) (born 1988), Ecuadorian footballer
- Luis Luna (Mexican footballer) (born 1920), Mexican footballer and Mexico international
- Luis Luna (poet) (born 1975), Spanish poet
- Luis Alberto Luna Tobar (1923–2017), Ecuadorian bishop
- Luis Luna (sprinter) (born 1983), Venezuelan sprinter and 2004 Olympian
- Luis Eduardo Luna, Colombian anthropologist and ayahuasca researcher
