= Lucas Acosta =

Lucas Acosta may refer to:

- Lucas Acosta (footballer, born 1988), Argentine currently playing for Racing Club de Montevideo
- Lucas Acosta (footballer, born 1995), currently playing for Club Atlético Sarmiento
