= Gustavo Lorenzetti =

Argentine-Chilean footballer (born 1985)

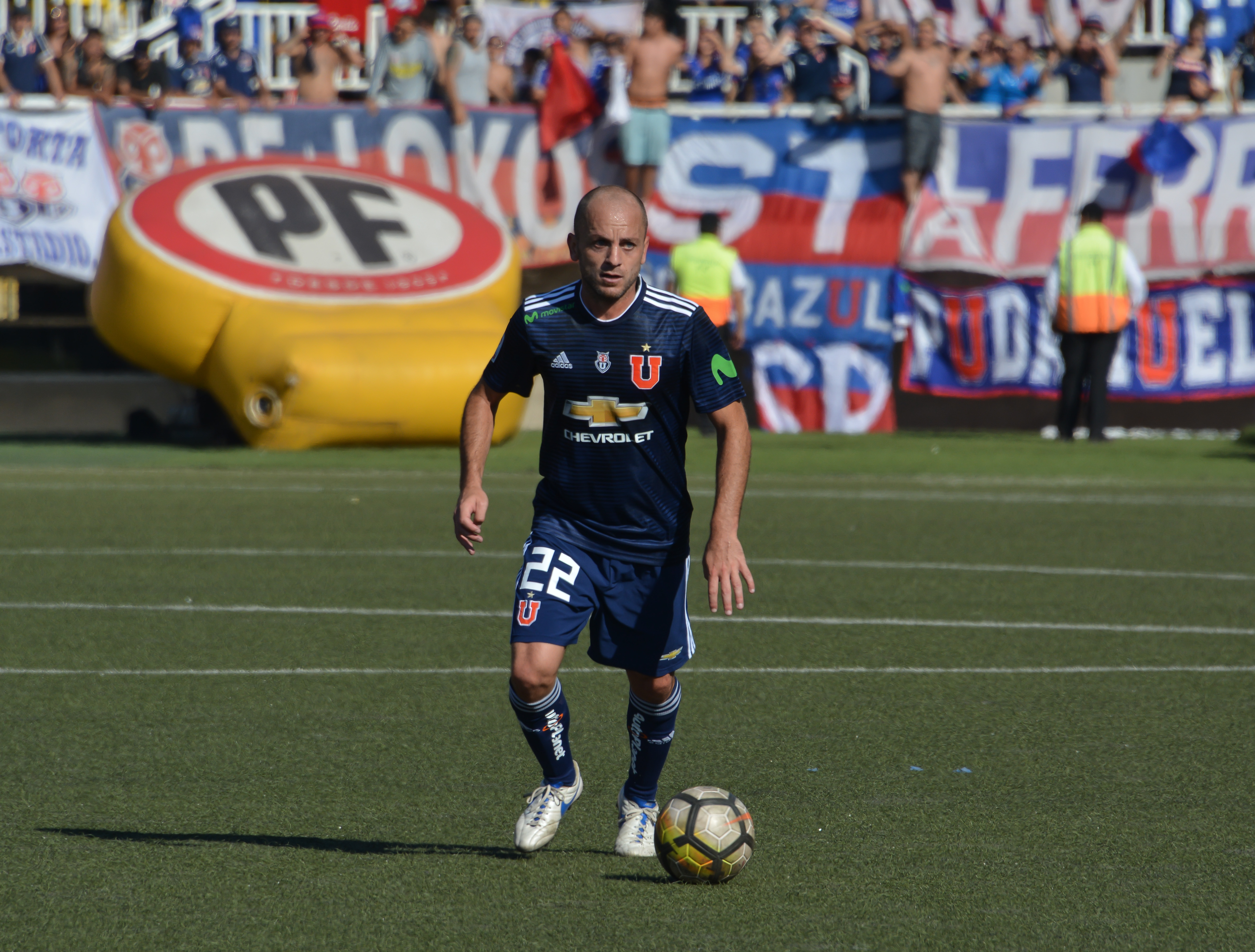
- Lorenzetti with Universidad de Chile in 2018

Personal information
- Full name: Gustavo Rubén Lorenzetti; Espinosa
- Date of birth: May 10, 1985 (age 41)
- Place of birth: Rosario, Argentina
- Height: 1.63 m (5 ft 4 in)
- Position: Attacking midfielder

Youth career
- 1994–2003: Rosario Central

Senior career*
Years	Team	Apps	(Gls)
2003–2007	Rosario Central	23	(0)
2006	→ Coquimbo Unido (loan)	37	(4)
2007	→ Universidad de Concepción (loan)	45	(5)
2008–2011	Universidad de Concepción	114	(11)
2011–2019	Universidad de Chile	197	(22)
2019	→ Nacional (loan)	12	(0)
2020–2022	Deportes Iquique	65	(1)
Total		493	(43)
- * Club domestic league appearances and goals

Gustavo Rubén Lorenzetti Espinosa (born May 10, 1985, in Rosario, Santa Fe Province, Argentina) is an Argentine naturalized Chilean former professional footballer who played as an attacking midfielder.

== Career ==
Lorenzetti joined Rosario Central youth squad in 1994. He made his professional debut for Rosario Central of the Primera Division Argentina on September 28, 2003. The coach at the time was Miguel Russo. Lorenzetti made his first start on February 22, 2004, against Boca Juniors. He also participated in Copa Libertadores 2004.

In 2006, he was loaned to Chilean club Coquimbo Unido. The team made it to the playoffs and Lorenzetti scored 4 goals and made twelve assists that season.

=== Universidad de Concepción ===
In 2007, Lorenzetti was loaned again to a Chilean club this time Universidad de Concepción with an option to buy the player at the end of the year. He again made the Chilean playoffs. In the first round of the playoffs, Universidad de Concepción upset Universidad Católica. In the second leg of the semifinal against Audax Italiano, the number one seed, Universidad de Concepción was on the verge of elimination when Lorenzetti scored an amazing goal to qualify Universidad de Concepción to the final against Colo-Colo.

In 2008, Universidad de Concepción picked up the option on Lorenzetti and bought the rights to the player. That year he won the 2008 Copa Chile tournament, defeating Deportes Ovalle in the final by 2–1.

=== Universidad de Chile ===
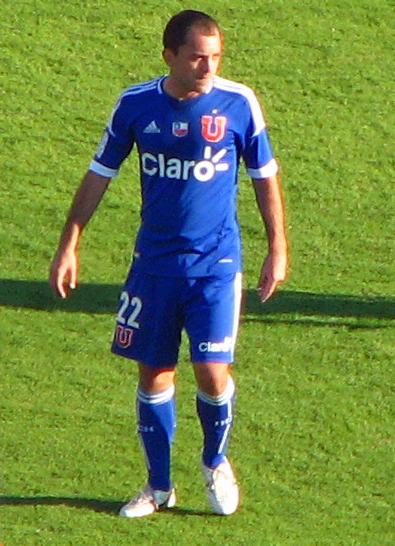
Lorenzetti with Universidad de Chile in 2012

On 9 June 2011, Universidad de Chile signed Lorenzetti from Universidad de Concepción for a fee of US$600,000 on a three-year contract. He scored a goal in his official debut in a 3–0 home win over La Serena on 30 July, for the first week of the Clausura Tournament. In his second official game, against Cobreloa, Lorenzetti scored two goals in the club's 3–1 victory and was named the man of the match. Some weeks later, he scored a brace in a 4–1 victory to Ñublense and in the following week scored again, in a 3–0 win over Unión San Felipe.

During the 2011 iteration of the Copa Sudamericana, Universidad de Chile won the tournament after defeating LDU Quito in the finals with an aggregate result of 4–0 in favor of Lorenzetti's club. He scored a goal in the second leg of the final in the club's 3–0 victory.

=== Retirement ===
In April 2023, he announced his retirement from playing, holding the record of assists as a player of Universidad de Chile in the 21st century.

== Personal life ==
Lorenzetti holds dual Argentine-Chilean nationality since he naturalized Chilean by residence in January 2017.

== Honours ==
=== Club ===
Universidad de Concepción

- Copa Chile (1): 2008–09

Universidad de Chile

- Primera División de Chile (4): 2011 Clausura, 2012 Apertura, 2014 Apertura, 2017 Clausura
- Copa Sudamericana (1): 2011
- Copa Chile (1): 2012–13, 2015
- Supercopa de Chile (1): 2015
