= Joao Plata =

Ecuadorian footballer (born 1992)

- Plata playing for Real Salt Lake against the Chicago Fire on May 25, 2013

Personal information
- Full name: Joao Jimmy Plata Cotera
- Date of birth: March 1, 1992 (age 34)
- Place of birth: Guayaquil, Ecuador
- Height: 1.57 m (5 ft 2 in)
- Position: Forward

Team information
- Current team: C.D. FAS

Youth career
- 2004–2007: Barcelona SC
- 2007–2009: Alfaro Moreno
- 2009–2010: LDU Quito

Senior career*
Years	Team	Apps	(Gls)
2010–2011	LDU Quito	7	(1)
2011	→ Toronto FC (loan)	26	(3)
2012	Toronto FC	10	(0)
2012	→ LDU Quito (loan)	13	(1)
2013–2019	Real Salt Lake	175	(46)
2019	→ Real Monarchs (loan)	1	(1)
2020–2021	Toluca	15	(1)
2022	Delfín	7	(0)
2023–	C.D. FAS	11	(4)

International career^{‡}
2011–2018	Ecuador	5	(2)
- * Club domestic league appearances and goals as of 3 December 2023 ‡ National team caps and goals as of 16 October 2018

Joao Jimmy Plata Cotera (Spanish pronunciation: [joˈaw ˈplata]; born March 1, 1992) is an Ecuadorian footballer who plays as a forward for C.D. FAS in the Primera División de Fútbol de El Salvador.

== Club career ==
=== LDU Quito ===
Plata began his career in the youth ranks of hometown club Barcelona before joining the Alfaro Moreno Academia in Guayaquil in 2009. After impressing at Alfaro Moreno he joined the youth ranks of LDU Quito.

Plata impressed Liga coach Edgardo Bauza and was called up to the senior side during the Second Stage of the 2010 Serie A season. On August 22, 2010, Plata made his professional debut for LDU Quito at Estadio Casa Blanca in a 1–0 victory over Olmedo. His debut was considered very promising and Plata became a fixture for the rest of the season.

On September 18, 2010, Plata scored his first professional goal in a 1–0 victory over ESPOLI. This important goal helped Liga consolidate their position at the top of the table. Plata ended the season appearing in 7 league matches (starting 5) and scoring one goal as Liga captured the Second Stage of the 2010 Serie A and then defeated Emelec to be declared national champion for the 10th time in the club's history.

=== Toronto FC ===
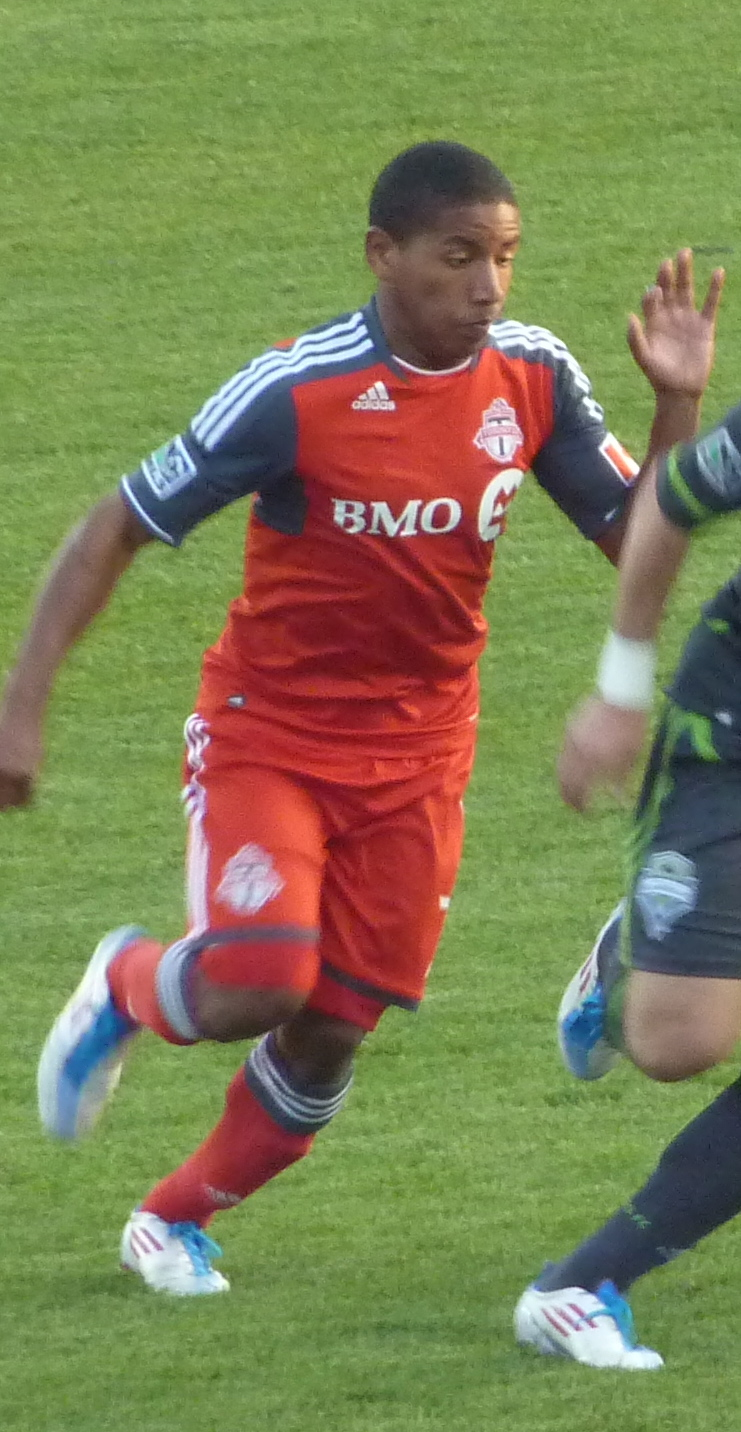
Plata playing for Toronto FC

At the conclusion of the 2010 season, in order to continue his development, Plata was loaned to Major League Soccer and was selected by Toronto FC with the No. 49 pick in the 2011 MLS SuperDraft. Toronto FC signed Plata on March 24, 2011. On April 2 Plata made his debut for Toronto as a second half sub for Alen Stevanović, in a 1–1 home draw against Chivas USA. On April 27 Plata made his first start for Toronto and provided two assists in a 3–0 away win against FC Edmonton in the first leg of the Canadian Championship. For the second leg on May 4, Plata again made the starting line-up and provided an assist as well as receiving Man of the Match honours in a 1–0 home win, giving Toronto a 4–0 aggregate victory over FC Edmonton to advance to the Canadian Championship final. Plata got his first MLS goal in a 2–1 victory over Houston Dynamo the goal was a well taken penalty and he later went on to set up the second for Maicon Santos, his performance earned him MLS player of the week. On July 2 Plata scored a crucial goal against Vancouver Whitecaps FC helping seal Toronto's third consecutive Canadian Championship, earning the team a berth in the CONCACAF Champions League. Plata was awarded the George Gross Memorial Trophy as the tournament's best player.

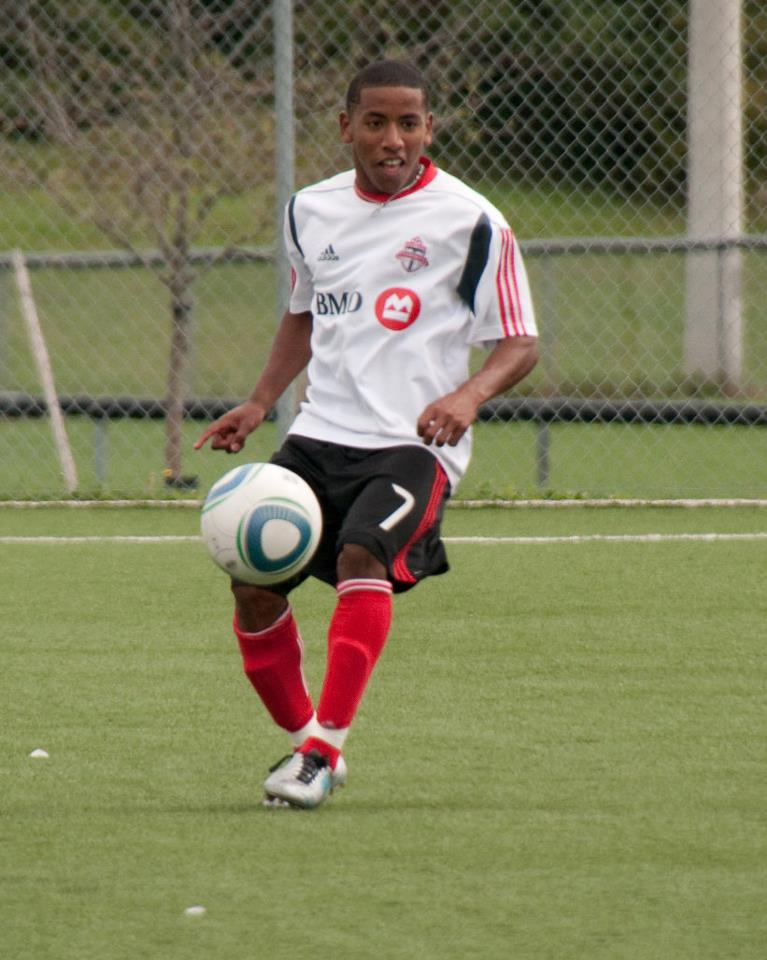
Plata playing for Toronto FC

On July 27 Plata made his Champions League debut against Real Esteli F.C. coming on for Gianluca Zavarise in the 49th minute, Plata led his team to a 2–1 home victory scoring both goals. Plata's success continued in the champions league scoring two goals in a crucial match-up against FC Dallas on October 18 in the final group stage game, with a 3–0 away victory it advanced Toronto to its first ever quarter final appearance.

On January 11, 2012, the club announced a multi-year deal to keep Plata at Toronto FC; as per club policy and league, the details of the new contract signing were not disclosed, but reports suggest a $500,000 fee was paid to secure him. Plata scored his first goal of the season on April 4, during the second leg of the 2011–12 CONCACAF Champions League semifinals against Santos Laguna, Plata scored both goals in a 6–2 away loss.

Plata returned to LDU Quito on a six-month loan from Toronto on July 11, 2012.

=== Real Salt Lake ===
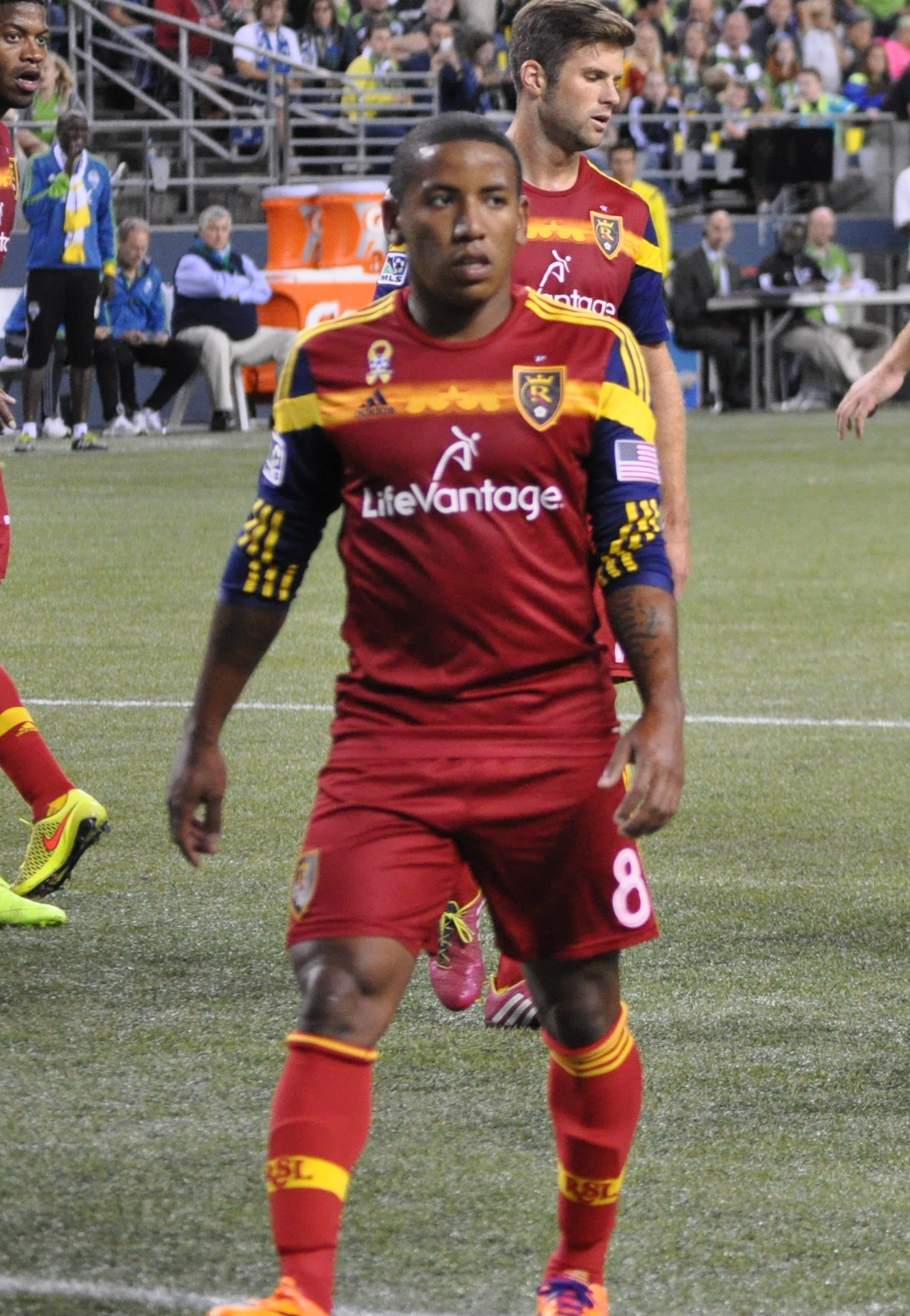
Joao Plata playing for RSL

Plata re-joined Toronto in January 2013 upon the end of the loan. However, on January 30, 2013, he was traded to Real Salt Lake in exchange for a second-round pick in the 2015 MLS SuperDraft.

On May 20, 2013, Plata scored his first goal for Real Salt Lake against Chivas USA.

In 2014, he scored a career high 13 goals, while also adding six assists, leading to the Twitter hashtag #PlataEsOro becoming popular, a play on the meaning of Plata's name, "plata" being the Spanish word for "silver" and "oro" meaning "gold."

In 2015, he re-signed with RSL, as a Young Designated Player contract. In 2017, he again extended his contract, remaining as a Designated Player, having passed the age for being a Young DP. Early in the 2019 season, he played a match with RSL's B team, Real Monarchs in the second tier USL Championship, scoring in a 4–1 victory against Reno 1868.

Following a disappointing season, in which he scored one goal, which came on a 95th-minute penalty kick against the Colorado Rapids, which was his first MLS goal in 364 days, his contract option was declined by Real Salt Lake after the 2019 season.

=== Toluca ===
On July 6, 2020, it was announced that Plata would join Liga MX side Toluca for the 2020–21 season. He scored his first goal for the club on January 24, 2021, against Necaxa. His contract was terminated in the summer of 2021.

=== Delfín ===
On January 28, 2022, he joined Ecuadorian Serie A club Delfín.

=== FAS ===
In August 2023, he joined C.D. FAS of the Primera División de Fútbol de El Salvador.

== International career ==
Plata was a member of the Ecuador Under-20 national team. On May 20, 2011, Plata was given his first senior call-up to the national team and made his debut for against Canada, on June 1, 2011, as a second half sub in a 2–2 away draw, at his club team, Toronto FC's home field BMO Field. Plata was called up for friendlies against the United States and El Salvador, in the game against El Salvador Plata scored two goals in a 5–1 win over El Salvador.

== Style of play ==
Standing at 1.57 m (5 ft 2 in), Plata is the shortest player in MLS history, alongside Cristian Techera and Yeferson Soteldo; although not physically imposing, his small stature, combined with his low centre of gravity and resulting balance, make him extremely agile, and allow him to change direction very quickly in tight spaces, while his strong legs allow him to excel in short bursts of speed. In addition to his mobility and elusiveness, Plata is an extremely quick and dynamic player, who is known for his great acceleration over short distances, and his pace on the ball, as well as his dribbling ability and technical skills. A creative forward, Plata is an accurate finisher, and is capable of both scoring and assisting goals, which allows him to play in several offensive positions: although he has been used as a striker or as a supporting forward, his favoured role is on the left wing, a position which allows him to move out wide to receive the ball, beat players on the dribble, and subsequently cut into the middle of the pitch on his stronger right foot to either shoot on goal or set up his teammates.

== Career statistics ==
=== Club ===
As of 9 November 2019

Appearances and goals by club, season and competition
Club	Season	League			Playoffs		Domestic Cup (Note: Appearances in the Canadian Championship and U.S. Open Cup.)		Continental		Total	
Club	Season	Division	Apps	Goals	Apps	Goals	Apps	Goals	Apps	Goals	Apps	Goals
LDU Quito	2010	Serie A	7	1	—		—		0	0	7	1
LDU Quito	Total		7	1	—		—		0	0	7	1
Toronto FC (loan)	2011	MLS	26	3	—		4	1	5 (Note: Appearances in the CONCACAF Champions League.)	4	35	8
Toronto FC	2012	MLS	10	0	—		3	0	4	2	17	2
Toronto FC	Total		36	3	—		7	1	9	6	52	10
LDU Quito (loan)	2012	Serie A	13	1	—		—		—		13	1
LDU Quito (loan)	Total		13	1	—		—		—		13	1
Real Salt Lake	2013	MLS	29	4	2	0	5	2	—		36	6
Real Salt Lake	2014	MLS	26	13	2	0	1	0	—		29	13
Real Salt Lake	2015	MLS	19	4	—		3	1	3	1	25	6
Real Salt Lake	2016	MLS	30	9	1	1	2	2	2	1	35	13
Real Salt Lake	2017	MLS	29	7	0	0	0	0	—		29	7
Real Salt Lake	2018	MLS	25	8	3	0	0	0	—		28	8
Real Salt Lake	2019	MLS	19	1	0	0	0	0	1 (Note: Appearances in the Leagues Cup.)	0	20	1
Real Salt Lake	Total		177	46	8	1	11	5	6	2	202	54
Real Monarchs (loan)	2019	USL Championship	1	1	0	0	—		—		1	1
Real Monarchs (loan)	Total		1	1	0	0	—		—		1	1
Career total			234	51	8	1	18	6	15	8	275	67

=== International ===
As of October 16, 2018

Ecuador national team
Year	Apps	Goals
2011	1	0
2014	3	2
2018	1	0
Total	5	2

==== International goals ====
#	Date	Venue	Opponent	Score	Final	Competition
1.	October 14, 2014	Red Bull Arena, New Jersey, United States	El Salvador	1–0	5–1	Friendly
2.	October 14, 2014	Red Bull Arena, New Jersey, United States	El Salvador	3–0	5–1	Friendly

== Honors ==
=== Club ===
LDU Quito

- Serie A (1): 2010

Toronto FC

- Canadian Championship (2): 2011, 2012

Real Salt Lake

- Major League Soccer Western Conference Championship (2): 2013, 2014

=== Individual ===
- George Gross Memorial Trophy: 2011
- Red Patch Boys Player of the Year: 2011
