= José Cevallos =

José Cevallos may refer to:

- José Cevallos Cepeda (1831–1893), Mexican politician
- José Cevallos (footballer, born 1971), Ecuadorian football goalkeeper
- José Cevallos (footballer, born 1995), Ecuadorian football attacking midfielder for Emelec, and son of footballer born 1971
