= Marlon Ganchozo =

Ecuadorian footballer (born 1991)

Personal information
- Full name: Marlon Javier Ganchozo Santana
- Date of birth: 21 February 1991 (age 35)
- Place of birth: Vinces, Los Ríos, Ecuador
- Position: Defender

Team information
- Current team: Patria

Youth career
- 2006–2008: Alfaro Moreno
- 2009–2010: LDU Quito

Senior career*
Years	Team	Apps	(Gls)
2010–2011	LDU Quito	56	(2)
2012	Rocafuerte	4	(0)
2012	Halley	4	(0)
2013	Patria	24	(5)
2014	LDU Portoviejo	33	(4)
2015–2016	Deportivo Quito	28	(3)
2016	Mushuc Runa	9	(0)
2017–	Patria	12	(0)

International career
2010	Ecuador Under-20	5	(0)
- * Club domestic league appearances and goals as of 12 August 2017

Marlon Javier Ganchozo Santana (born 21 February 1991) is an Ecuadorian football defender who plays for Patria.

== Club career ==
Marlon Ganchozo began his career at the Alfaro Moreno Academia in Guayaquil. In 2009, he joined the youth ranks of LDU Quito and appeared in 24 matches for the Under-18 side. His play with the Under-18 side did not go unnoticed by manager Edgardo Bauza and Ganchozo was promoted to the senior side in 2010.

Ganchozo quickly gained the trust of Bauza and earned a starting spot for the club. On 4 April 2010 in a league match played at Estadio Casa Blanca against longtime rival Barcelona which ended in a 0–0 draw, Ganchozo suffered a serious leg injury that sidelined him for two months. Upon recovering from his injury Ganchozo regained the form that made him one of the most promising players in Ecuadorean football. He scored his first goal for Liga on 22 July 2010 in the rematch against Barcelona helping his side to a 2–1 victory. After helping LDU Quito win the Second Stage of the 2010 Serie A, Ganchozo started both legs of the finals against Emelec helping his club to a 2–1 aggregate victory which proclaimed LDU Quito as national champion for the 10th time in its history.

== Honors ==
LDU Quito

- Serie A: 2010
