= Lucas Concistre =

Argentine football forward

Personal information
- Full name: Lucas Omar Concistre
- Date of birth: 5 November 1984 (age 42)
- Place of birth: Quilmes, Argentina
- Height: 1.84 m (6 ft 0 in)
- Position: Forward

Senior career*
Years	Team	Apps	(Gls)
2005	Tristán Suárez	27	(4)
2006	Sportivo Italiano	16	(11)
2006	Defensores de Belgrano	18	(5)
2007	Sarmiento de Junín	22	(14)
2007–2008	Platense	26	(11)
2008–2009	Instituto	25	(5)
2009–2010	Olimpo	28	(7)
2010	Anorthosis Famagusta	4	(0)
2011	Ñublense	31	(8)
2012	Independiente del Valle	15	(5)
2012–2013	Sarmiento de Junín	12	(2)
2013	Chacarita Juniors	11	(1)
2013	Municipal	24	(6)
2014–2015	Santiago Morning	28	(13)
2015–2016	Everton	25	(4)
- * Club domestic league appearances and goals

Lucas Omar Concistre (born 11 May 1984) is an Argentinian former professional footballer who played as a forward.

== Career ==
Concistre won promotion to the Argentine Primera División with Olimpo during the 2009–10 season of the Primera B Nacional.

- (Argentina) Tristán Suárez 2005
- (Argentina) Sportivo Italiano 2006
- (Argentina) Defensores de Belgrano 2006
- (Argentina) Sarmiento de Junín 2007
- (Argentina) Platense 2007–2008
- (Argentina) Instituto 2008–2009
- (Argentina) Olimpo 2009–2010
- (Cyprus) Anorthosis Famagusta 2010
- (Chile) Ñublense 2011
- (Ecuador) Independiente del Valle 2012
- (Argentina) Sarmiento de Junín 2012
- (Argentina) Chacarita Juniors 2013
- (Guatemala) Municipal 2013
- (Chile) Santiago Morning 2014–2015
- (Chile) Everton 2015–2016
