= Paúl Ambrosi =

Ecuadorian footballer (born 1980)

Personal information
- Full name: Vicente Paúl Ambrosi Zambrano
- Date of birth: 14 October 1980 (age 46)
- Place of birth: Guaranda, Ecuador
- Height: 1.77 m (5 ft 10 in)
- Position: Left-back

Youth career
- 1997–2000: LDU Quito

Senior career*
Years	Team	Apps	(Gls)
2000–2009	LDU Quito	328	(35)
2009–2010	Rosario Central	21	(0)
2010–2013	LDU Quito	44	(1)
2013	→ Cerro Porteño (loan)	1	(0)
2014	Olmedo	11	(0)
Total		405	(36)

International career
2003–2009	Ecuador	35	(0)
- * Club domestic league appearances and goals

Vicente Paúl Ambrosi Zambrano, commonly known as Paúl Ambrosi (born 14 October 1980), is an Ecuadorian former professional footballer who played as a left-back. He spent the vast majority of his professional career at LDU Quito.

== Club career ==
Ambrosi was born in Guaranda. He played for LDU Quito for most of his career. On the national level, he helped LDU Quito win three Serie A national championships, and one Serie B title. In 2008, he was a starting player on the squad that won the Copa Libertadores, the first for the club and for the country. In August 2009, he signed with Argentine club Rosario Central. He returned to LDU Quito after one season with Rosario Central.

== International career ==
Ambrosi was first called up to play for the Ecuador national team on 20 August 2003, in a game friendly against Guatemala. He became a regular fixture on the team as a starter and a substitute, playing in the 2004 Copa América, 2006 World Cup, and in the 2010 World Cup qualifiers.

== Career statistics ==
Appearances and goals by club, season and competition
Club	Season	League			National cup		Continental		Total	
Club	Season	Division	Apps	Goals	Apps	Goals	Apps	Goals	Apps	Goals
LDU Quito	2000	Ecuadorian Serie A	8	0	—		0	0	8	0
LDU Quito	2001	Serie B	30	6	—		0	0	30	6
LDU Quito	2002	Ecuadorian Serie A	43	1	—		0	0	43	1
LDU Quito	2003	Ecuadorian Serie A	42	10	—		4	1	46	11
LDU Quito	2004	Ecuadorian Serie A	42	5	—		16	4	58	9
LDU Quito	2005	Ecuadorian Serie A	43	4	—		15	0	58	4
LDU Quito	2006	Ecuadorian Serie A	36	5	—		11	0	47	5
LDU Quito	2007	Ecuadorian Serie A	31	1	—		8	1	39	2
LDU Quito	2008	Ecuadorian Serie A	30	0	—		18	1	48	1
LDU Quito	2009	Ecuadorian Serie A	23	3	—		7	0	30	3
LDU Quito	Total		328	35	—		79	7	407	42
Rosario Central	2009–10	Primera División	21	0	—		0	0	21	0
LDU Quito	2010	Ecuadorian Serie A	11	0	—		2	0	13	0
LDU Quito	2011	Ecuadorian Serie A	22	1	—		16	2	38	3
LDU Quito	2012	Ecuadorian Serie A	6	0	—		0	0	6	0
LDU Quito	Total		39	1	—		18	2	58	3
Cerro Porteño	2013	Primera División	1	0	—		1	0	2	0
LDU Quito	2013	Ecuadorian Serie A	5	0	—		0	0	5	0
Olmedo	2014	Ecuadorian Serie A	11	0	—		—		11	0
Career total			405	36	—		98	9	503	45

== Honours ==
LDU Quito

- Serie A: 2003, 2005 A, 2007, 2010
- Copa Libertadores: 2008
- Recopa Sudamericana: 2009
