= Luis Luna (footballer) =

Ecuadorian footballer (born 1988)

Personal information
- Full name: Luis Alejandro Luna Quinteros
- Date of birth: January 25, 1988 (age 38)
- Place of birth: Guayaquil, Ecuador
- Height: 1.81 m (5 ft 11 in)
- Positions: Centre back; defensive midfielder

Team information
- Current team: LDU Portoviejo
- Number: 3

Youth career
- 2004–2008: Emelec
- 2008–2009: ESPOL

Senior career*
Years	Team	Apps	(Gls)
2009	→ Aucas (loan)	5	(0)
2010	Municipal Cañar	32	(2)
2011–2012	Imbabura	45	(3)
2012–2014	LDU Quito	19	(0)
2015–2016	El Nacional	31	(1)
2016–2017	Fuerza Amarilla	27	(2)
2017–2018	Delfín	55	(3)
2018	Independiente Medellín	15	(0)
2019	Deportivo Cuenca	13	(0)
2019	Guayaquil City	12	(0)
2020–	LDU Portoviejo	5	(0)
- * Club domestic league appearances and goals as of 15:16, 2 July 2020 (UTC)

Luis Alejandro Luna Quinteros (born January 25, 1988) is an Ecuadorian footballer who plays as a centre back or defensive midfielder for L.D.U. Portoviejo.
