= Geovanny Caicedo =

Ecuadorian footballer (born 1981)

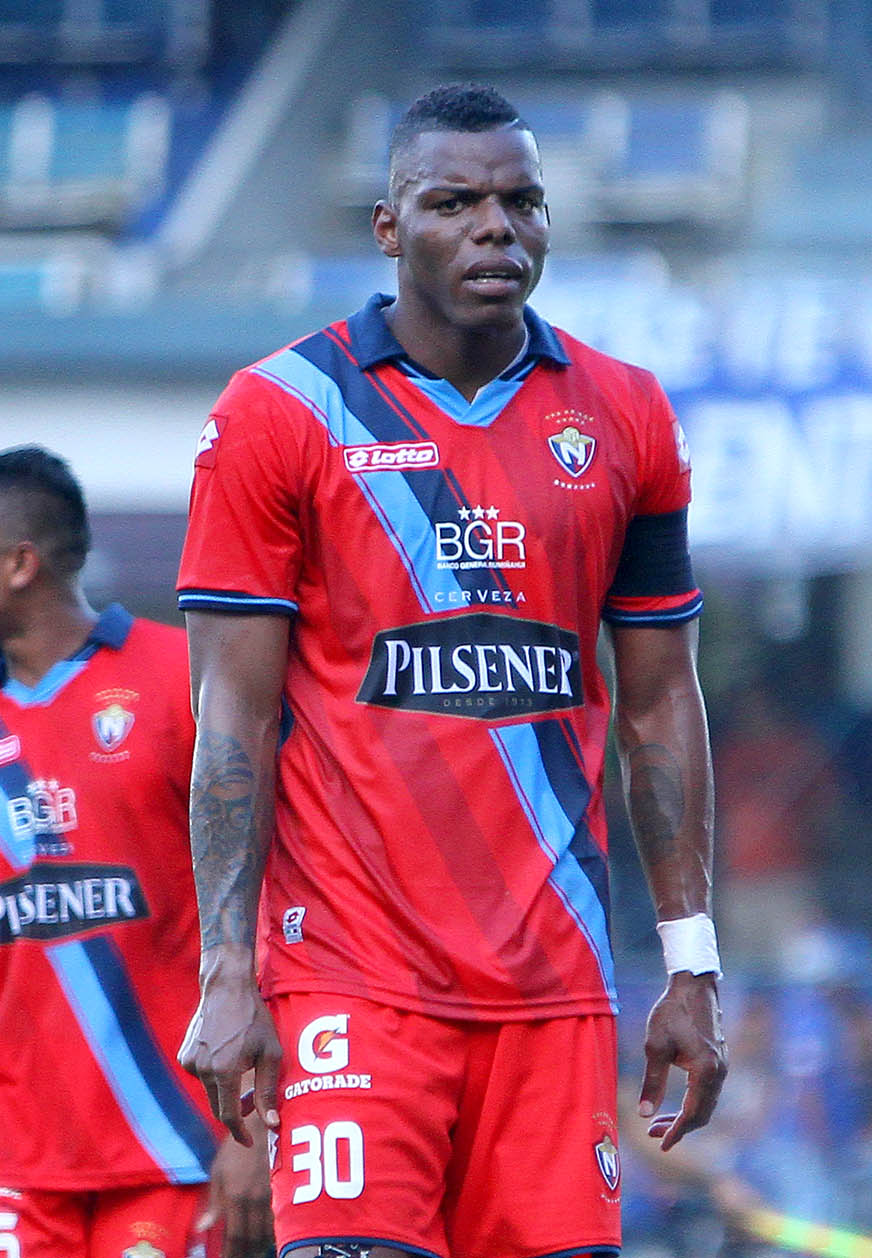
- Caicedo playing for El Nacional in 2015

Personal information
- Full name: Banner Geovanny Caicedo Quiñónez
- Date of birth: March 28, 1981 (age 45)
- Place of birth: Esmeraldas, Ecuador
- Height: 1.88 m (6 ft 2 in)
- Position: Defender

Team information
- Current team: Fuerza Amarilla

Youth career
- 1998–2003: Patria

Senior career*
Years	Team	Apps	(Gls)
2000	Huracán	11	(0)
2003–2006	Barcelona	90	(8)
2007	Emelec	24	(1)
2008	El Nacional	29	(0)
2009–2010	Deportivo Quito	58	(6)
2011–2012	LDU Quito	30	(1)
2012	Toronto FC	0	(0)
2012	Deportivo Cuenca	11	(1)
2013–2014	Deportivo Quito	23	(0)
2014–2015	El Nacional	54	(4)
2016	River Ecuador	11	(2)
2017–2018	Fuerza Amarilla	0	(0)

International career
2009–2011	Ecuador	8	(0)
- * Club domestic league appearances and goals as of July 11, 2017

Banner Geovanny Caicedo Quiñónez (born March 28, 1981, in Esmeraldas) is an Ecuadorian footballer.

== Career ==
=== Youth ===
Caicedo began his youth career with Patria in Guayaquil. In 2000, he was loaned to Huracán Sporting Club and made 11 appearances for the club before returning to Patria.

=== Professional ===
In 2003 Caicedo joined top Ecuadorean club Barcelona and quickly established himself as a fixture on defense for the club. In his four years with Barcelona he appeared in 90 league matches and scored 8 goals. In 2007, he joined Emelec and the following season played for El Nacional. The 2009 season saw Caicedo join Deportivo Quito with which he remained for two seasons appearing in 58 matches and scoring 6 goals. During the 2009 season he helped Deportivo in capturing the Serie A title. After a successful stay with Deportivo in 2011 he joined rival club LDU Quito and went on to appear in 29 matches scoring 1 goal.

On January 13, 2012, Caicedo announced that he would be joining Toronto FC and would be set to join the team during preseason, joining his countryman Joao Plata. His signing was officially announced by Toronto FC on January 26, 2012. He left Toronto FC on March 9, 2012, without playing an official game, his contract was terminated by mutual consent after having difficulty adjusting to the style of play and being away from his family.

== International ==
Caicedo has made 9 appearances for Ecuador and was selected as part of the squad for 2011 Copa América. He was last called up in a friendly against the United States on October 11, 2011.
