= Fernando Hidalgo =

Ecuadorian footballer (born 1985)

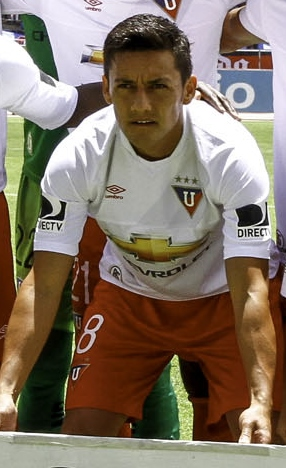
- Hidalgo in 2015

Personal information
- Full name: Fernando Roberto Hidalgo Maldonado
- Date of birth: 20 May 1985 (age 41)
- Place of birth: Quito, Ecuador
- Height: 1.78 m (5 ft 10 in)
- Position: Midfielder

Team information
- Current team: Cumbayá F.C.

Youth career
- 1999−2002: ESPOLI
- 2002−2005: Deportivo Quito

Senior career*
Years	Team	Apps	(Gls)
2005	Tungurahua	15	(4)
2006–2007	Deportivo Quito	79	(4)
2008–2010	Barcelona	101	(3)
2011–2017	L.D.U. Quito	243	(9)
2018	Aucas	33	(0)
2019	Quiteños FC	9	(1)
2019–2020	Atlético Porteño	16	(1)
2020–	Cumbayá	16	(1)

International career
2007–2010	Ecuador	12	(0)
- * Club domestic league appearances and goals as of 00:43, 6 November 2019 (UTC)

Fernando Roberto Hidalgo Maldonado (born 20 May 1985 in Quito) is an Ecuadorian footballer who plays for Cumbayá as a midfielder.

== Club career ==
Hidalgo came out of the youth system of Deportivo Quito. Before debuting for the Quito club's professional team, he played one season with Tungurahua in Ambato. He played his first season Deportivo Quito in 2006, where he became a key player for the next two seasons. In 2008, after the request of then manager Ever Hugo Almeida, he was signed by Guayaquil-based club Barcelona. However, he saw little starting time under Almeida's guidance. It wasn't until Reinaldo Merlo became the manager of Barcelona did he begin to make an impact and become a starter. He eventually captained the team and earned the nickname el Capitán. In late 2010, he returned to Quito when he signed a five-year contract with L.D.U. Quito starting in the 2011 season.

== International career ==
Fernando also was included in Ecuador's 2010 World Cup qualifying campaign. In November 2008, he was called up to take action in a friendly against Mexico.
