= Jorge Guagua =

Ecuadorian footballer (born 1981)

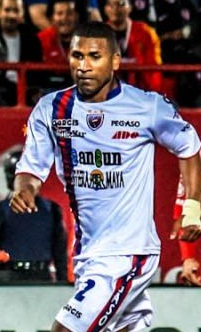

Personal information
- Full name: Jorge Daniel Guagua Tamayo
- Date of birth: 28 September 1981 (age 45)
- Place of birth: Esmeraldas, Ecuador
- Height: 1.80 m (5 ft 11 in)
- Position: Centre back

Team information
- Current team: 9 de Octubre (sporting director)

Youth career
- 1998–1999: Naval
- 1999–2000: El Nacional

Senior career*
Years	Team	Apps	(Gls)
2000–2006	El Nacional	193	(13)
2006–2007	Colón	18	(0)
2007	Emelec	10	(0)
2008	Barcelona SC	27	(2)
2009	El Nacional	30	(1)
2010–2011	LDU Quito	63	(3)
2012	Atlante	32	(1)
2013	Deportivo Quito	38	(3)
2014–2018	Emelec	90	(9)
2019	Guayaquil City	7	(0)
2019	9 de Octubre	0	(0)
Total		508	(32)

International career
2001–2015	Ecuador	63	(2)
- * Club domestic league appearances and goals

Jorge Daniel Guagua Tamayo (Spanish pronunciation: [ˈxoɾxe ˈɣwaɣwa]; born 28 September 1981) is an Ecuadorian retired professional footballer who played as a defender. He is currently a sporting director of Club 9 de Octubre.

== Club career ==
He was transferred to Colón de Santa Fe of Argentina right after the 2006 FIFA World Cup. After a year of steady performances there he returned to Ecuador to play for Club Sport Emelec. In December 2007 Guagua agreed to join Emelec's city rivals Barcelona SC For the 2009 season he will make his return to the team that made him famous, El Nacional.

On 1 December 2011, his transfer to Mexican club Atlante FC was confirmed.

In June 2019, Guagua joined Club 9 de Octubre. Retiring at the end of the year, it was confirmed in January 2020, that Guagua would continue at 9 de Octubre as the club's new sporting director.

== International career ==
A central defender, Guagua had a promising start to his career. His quick, technical abilities meant he was included in Ecuador's squad for the 2001 FIFA World Youth Championship. In the same year, he made his debut for Ecuador's senior side and he was named in his country's squad for the 2006 FIFA World Cup. He also played in the 2007 Copa América held in Venezuela.

However, Guagua, who captained Club Deportivo El Nacional to the 2005 league championship, is generally used as a substitute behind record appearance maker Ivan Hurtado in Ecuador's current side. He has 16 international caps and one goal as at 19 May 2006 against Mexico.

== Honors ==
El Nacional

- Serie A: 2005 Clausura

LDU Quito

- Serie A: 2010
- Recopa Sudamericana: 2010

Serie A

- 2014 Campeonato Ecuatoriano de Fútbol.
- 2015 Campeonato Ecuatoriano de Fútbol.
- 2017 Campeonato Ecuatoriano de Fútbol.
