= Enrique Gámez =

Ecuadorian footballer (born 1981)

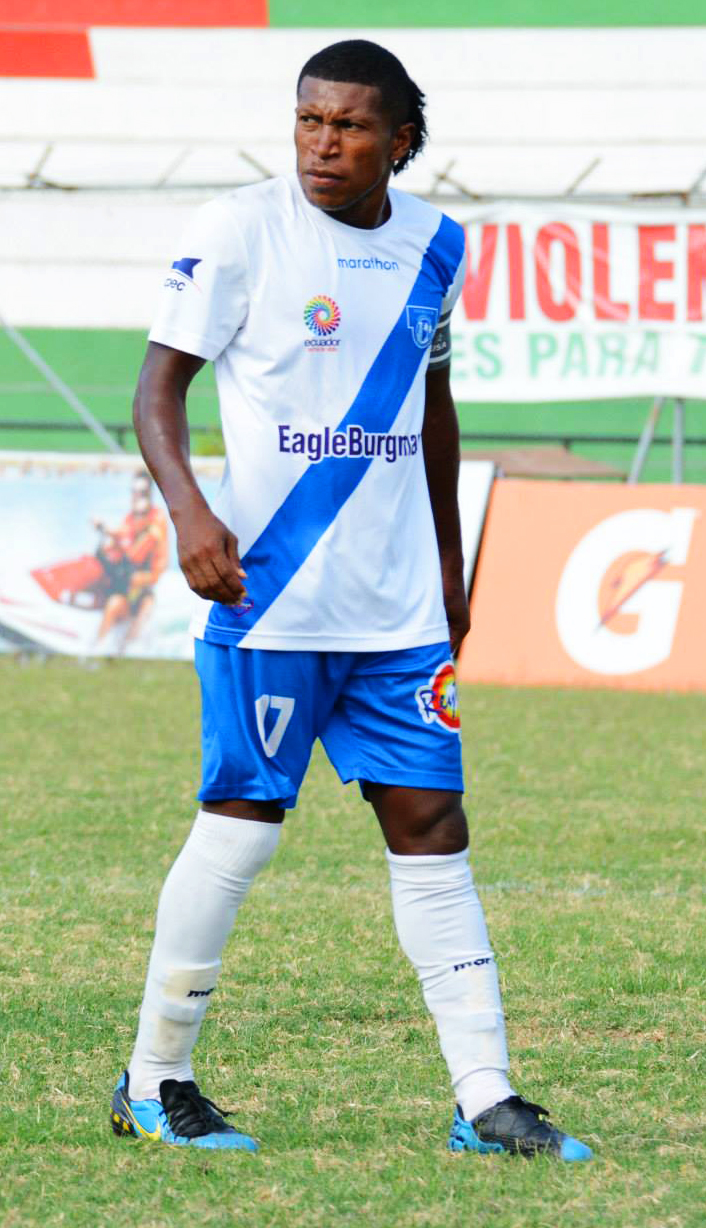
- Gamez in 2014

Personal information
- Full name: Enrique Roberto Gámez Quintero
- Date of birth: July 13, 1981 (age 45)
- Place of birth: Esmeraldas, Ecuador
- Position: Wing back

Team information
- Current team: Rocafuerte

Youth career
- 1998–2000: Esmeraldas Petrolero

Senior career*
Years	Team	Apps	(Gls)
1999–2001	Esmeraldas Petrolero	42	(4)
2002–2005	LDU Portoviejo	83	(7)
2005–2006	Deportivo Cuenca	30	(1)
2007	Barcelona	19	(0)
2008–2009	Macará	68	(5)
2010–2012	LDU Quito	38	(0)
2012	Mushuc Runa	5	(0)
2013	Macará	9	(0)
2014–2016	Esmeraldas Petrolero	42	(3)
2017–	Rocafuerte	6	(0)

International career^{‡}
2008	Ecuador	1	(0)
- * Club domestic league appearances and goals as of June 3, 2017 ‡ National team caps and goals as of December 19, 2008

Enrique Roberto Gámez Quintero (born July 13, 1981) is an Ecuadorian footballer who plays for Rocafuerte.

== Honors ==
LDU Quito

- Serie A: 2010
- Recopa Sudamericana: 2010
