= José Valencia (footballer, born 1982) =

Ecuadorian footballer

Personal information
- Full name: José Luis Valencia Murillo
- Date of birth: March 19, 1982 (age 44)
- Place of birth: Quininde, Esmeraldas, Ecuador
- Height: 1.75 m (5 ft 9 in)
- Position: Defender

Senior career*
Years	Team	Apps	(Gls)
2000–2001	Delfín	28	(0)
2002–2003	Deportivo Maldonado	10	(0)
2004–2006	Ajax	0	(0)
2004–2006	N.E.C.	29	(0)
2006–2009	Willem II	33	(1)
2008–2009	→ Eindhoven (loan)	30	(1)
2009–2010	Wuppertal	9	(0)
2010–2011	LDU Quito	24	(0)
2013	Cumbayá	1	(1)
- * Club domestic league appearances and goals as of July 5, 2013

José Luis Valencia Murillo (born March 19, 1982, in Quininde, Esmeraldas) is a retired Ecuadorian footballer.

== Club career ==
Prior to going back to play in Ecuador, he played for a number of clubs in Germany (Wuppertal), Netherlands (Ajax, N.E.C., Willem II, Eindhoven), Uruguay (Deportivo Maldonado), as well as having spent his youth career at Delfín in his native country.

== International career ==
He was called up for the Ecuador national team once in 2006, but did not play.

== Honours ==
LDU Quito

- Serie A: 2010
