= Ezequiel González =

Argentine footballer

Personal information
- Date of birth: 10 July 1980 (age 46)
- Place of birth: Rosario, Argentina
- Height: 1.78 m (5 ft 10 in)
- Position: Midfielder

Team information
- Current team: Panathinaikos (scout)

Youth career
- 1997: Rosario Central

Senior career*
Years	Team	Apps	(Gls)
1997–2001	Rosario Central	96	(20)
2001–2002	Fiorentina	19	(1)
2002–2003	Boca Juniors	23	(3)
2003	Rosario Central	20	(3)
2004–2008	Panathinaikos	72	(14)
2008–2009	Rosario Central	29	(3)
2009–2010	Fluminense	12	(1)
2011	LDU Quito	28	(5)
Total		299	(50)
- * Club domestic league appearances and goals

Ezequiel "Equi" González (Spanish pronunciation: [eseˈkjel ɣonˈsales]; born 10 July 1980) is an Argentine former professional footballer who played as a midfielder.

== Career ==
Born in Rosario, González started playing professionally at home-based Primera División Argentina Rosario Central in 1997. His success in the club from Rosario took him to Fiorentina. Early in 2002 he returned to Argentina to play for Boca Juniors, and then a year later he joined his first club, Rosario Central.

After half a season (a short championship in Argentina), González moved to Panathinaikos, where became captain of the team, and helped the club to win its first championship in seven years in 2004. That year he also won the Greek Cup with Panathinaikos completing the Double. In his first UEFA Champions League appearance in September 2004 he scored two goals against Tippeligaen champions Rosenborg. González picked up a cruciate ligament injury during a friendly match against Apollon Athinon (1–0). Due to this injury, he played only one match during the 2006–07 season. He returned from his injury, against Apollon Kalamarias (1–0) on 6 January 2008.

On 27 June 2008, he went back to Rosario Central. At the end of the season he moved to Fluminense on a free transfer to play in the Brazilian League. In 2011 he chose to play for LDU Quito in Ecuador. At the end of his contract he retired.

== Honours ==
Boca Juniors

- Copa Libertadores: 2003

Panathinaikos

- Super League Greece: 2003–04
- Greek Cup: 2003–04
