= Daniel Viteri =

Ecuadorian footballer (born 1981)

Personal information
- Full name: Daniel Jimmy Viteri Vinces
- Date of birth: December 12, 1981 (age 44)
- Place of birth: Guayaquil, Ecuador
- Height: 1.86 m (6 ft 1 in)
- Position: Goalkeeper

Team information
- Current team: Guayaquil City
- Number: 25

Youth career
- 1994–2000: Emelec

Senior career*
Years	Team	Apps	(Gls)
1999–2004	Emelec	85	(0)
2005–2007	Deportivo Quito	97	(0)
2008–2017	L.D.U. Quito	104	(0)
2010	→ Barcelona SC (loan)	5	(0)
2018	Orense SC	14	(0)
2018–	Guayaquil City	0	(0)

International career
2001	Ecuador U-20	4	(0)
2002–2007	Ecuador	5	(0)
- * Club domestic league appearances and goals as of July 18, 2018

Daniel Jimmy Viteri Vinces (born December 12, 1981, in Guayaquil) is an Ecuadoran footballer.

== Honors ==
Emelec

- Serie A: 2001, 2002

L.D.U. Quito

- Copa Libertadores: 2008
- Copa Sudamericana: 2009
- Recopa Sudamericana: 2009
