= Galo Corozo =

Ecuadorian footballer (born 1990)

Personal information
- Full name: Galo Ricardo Corozo Junco
- Date of birth: 20 August 1990 (age 36)
- Place of birth: Babahoyo, Ecuador
- Position: Midfielder

Team information
- Current team: Manta
- Number: 2

Youth career
- 2006–2009: LDU Quito

Senior career*
| Years | Team | Apps | (Gls) |
| 2009–2012 | LDU Quito | 21 | (0) |
| 2013–2017 | Deportivo Cuenca | 90 | (0) |
| 2017–2021 | Macará | 21 | (0) |
- * Club domestic league appearances and goals as of 18 August 2017

Galo Ricardo Corozo Junco (born 20 August 1990) is an Ecuadorian footballer who plays for Manta F.C. A product of LDU Quito youth system, he earned his first senior cap on 3 October 2009 in a game against Deportivo Cuenca.

== Honors ==
LDU Quito

- Serie A: 2010
