= Walter Calderón =

Ecuadorian footballer (born 1977)

Personal information
- Full name: Walter Richard Calderón Carcelén
- Date of birth: October 17, 1977 (age 49)
- Place of birth: Ambuquí, Imbabura, Ecuador
- Height: 1.90 m (6 ft 3 in)
- Position: Forward

Senior career*
Years	Team	Apps	(Gls)
1997–2000	ESPOLI	45	(4)
2000–2006	Deportivo Cuenca	228	(73)
2007	El Nacional	31	(6)
2008	Deportivo Quito	27	(7)
2009–2011	LDU Quito	64	(16)
2012	LDU Loja	33	(8)
2013–2014	Deportivo Quito	66	(12)
2015	Deportivo Cuenca	17	(0)
2016	Imbabura	15	(2)

International career^{‡}
2003–2009	Ecuador	11	(0)
- * Club domestic league appearances and goals as of June 26, 2016 ‡ National team caps and goals as of August 31, 2009

Walter Richard Calderón Carcelén, nicknamed Mamita (born October 17, 1977) is a retired Ecuadorian football player.

== Club career ==
Calderón began his professional career at Quito-based club ESPOLI. In 2000, he made the move to Deportivo Cuenca. At the club, he became a regular starter. He was a key player in the club's 2004 national champion squad. He soon left the squad in 2006 and moved to El Nacional in 2007 and Deportivo Quito in 2008. With Deportivo Quito, he won his second national title. In 2009, he made the move to LDU Quito. Despite having irregular starting times, he became a clutch striker, providing goals at decisive times. He won another national title with Liga in 2010, the 2009 Copa Sudamericana, and two Recopa Sudamericana (2009, 2010).

== Honors ==
Deportivo Cuenca

- Serie A: 2004

Deportivo Quito

- Serie A: 2008

LDU Quito

- Serie A: 2010
- Copa Sudamericana: 2009
