= Argenis Moreira =

Ecuadorian footballer (born 1987)

Personal information
- Full name: Erwin Argenis Moreira Alcivar
- Date of birth: June 15, 1987 (age 39)
- Place of birth: Manta, Ecuador
- Height: 1.86 m (6 ft 1 in)
- Position: Centre back

Team information
- Current team: Manta

Youth career
- 2003–2007: Delfín
- 2009: Macará

Senior career*
Years	Team	Apps	(Gls)
2006–2007	Delfín	33	(0)
2008	Técnico Universitario	27	(1)
2009–2010	Macará	56	(0)
2011	L.D.U. Quito	10	(2)
2012	Técnico Universitario	31	(1)
2013	Deportivo Cuenca	30	(0)
2014–2016	Mushuc Runa	37	(2)
2016	LDU Portoviejo	27	(1)
2017	Colón FC		
2018–2019	Gualaceo SC		
2020–	Manta		
- * Club domestic league appearances and goals as of August 12, 2017

Erwin Argenis Moreira Alcivar (born June 15, 1987) is an Ecuadorian football defender who plays for Colón F.C. in the Ecuadorian Serie B.

== Club career ==
At LDU Quito, he spent the first couple of matches in 2011 as an alternate. He gained his first cap with the team starting against Manta FC on February 20, 2011. In the same match, he scored his first goal for the team and opened up the scoreboard in a 5–0 rout.

In January 2020, Moreira joined Ecuadorian Serie B club Manta FC.
