= Lucas Acosta (footballer, born 1988) =

Argentine football midfielder

Personal information
- Full name: Lucas Emanuel Acosta
- Date of birth: January 26, 1988 (age 38)
- Place of birth: Santa Fe, Argentina
- Height: 1.78 m (5 ft 10 in)
- Position: Midfielder

Senior career*
Years	Team	Apps	(Gls)
2006–2011	Colón	48	(8)
2011–2012	LDU Quito	14	(3)
2012–2013	Boca Unidos	8	(0)
2013	O'Higgins	11	(1)
2014–2015	Gimnasia de Jujuy	9	(1)
2015–2016	Sarmiento Resistencia	21	(2)
2016–2017	Flandria	2	(0)
2017	Racing de Montevideo	6	(0)
2017–2018	Juventud Antoniana	17	(3)
2018	Deportivo Sanarate	4	(0)
2019	Sarmiento de La Banda	1	(0)
2020	Huracán de Comodoro	4	(3)
- * Club domestic league appearances and goals as of 20:00, 1 August 2021 (UTC)

Lucas Emanuel Acosta (born January 26, 1988) is an Argentine football midfielder. Who recently played for Huracán de Comodoro Rivadavia

He made his professional debut while playing for Colón de Santa Fe on August 5, 2006, in a 4–1 home defeat Independiente. In July 2011, he was transferred to newly promoted San Martín de San Juan, who later loaned him to Ecuadorian-club LDU Quito for a year.
