= Estadio Rodrigo Paz Delgado =

Football stadium in Quito, Ecuador

- La Casa Blanca; La Maravilla de Ponceano

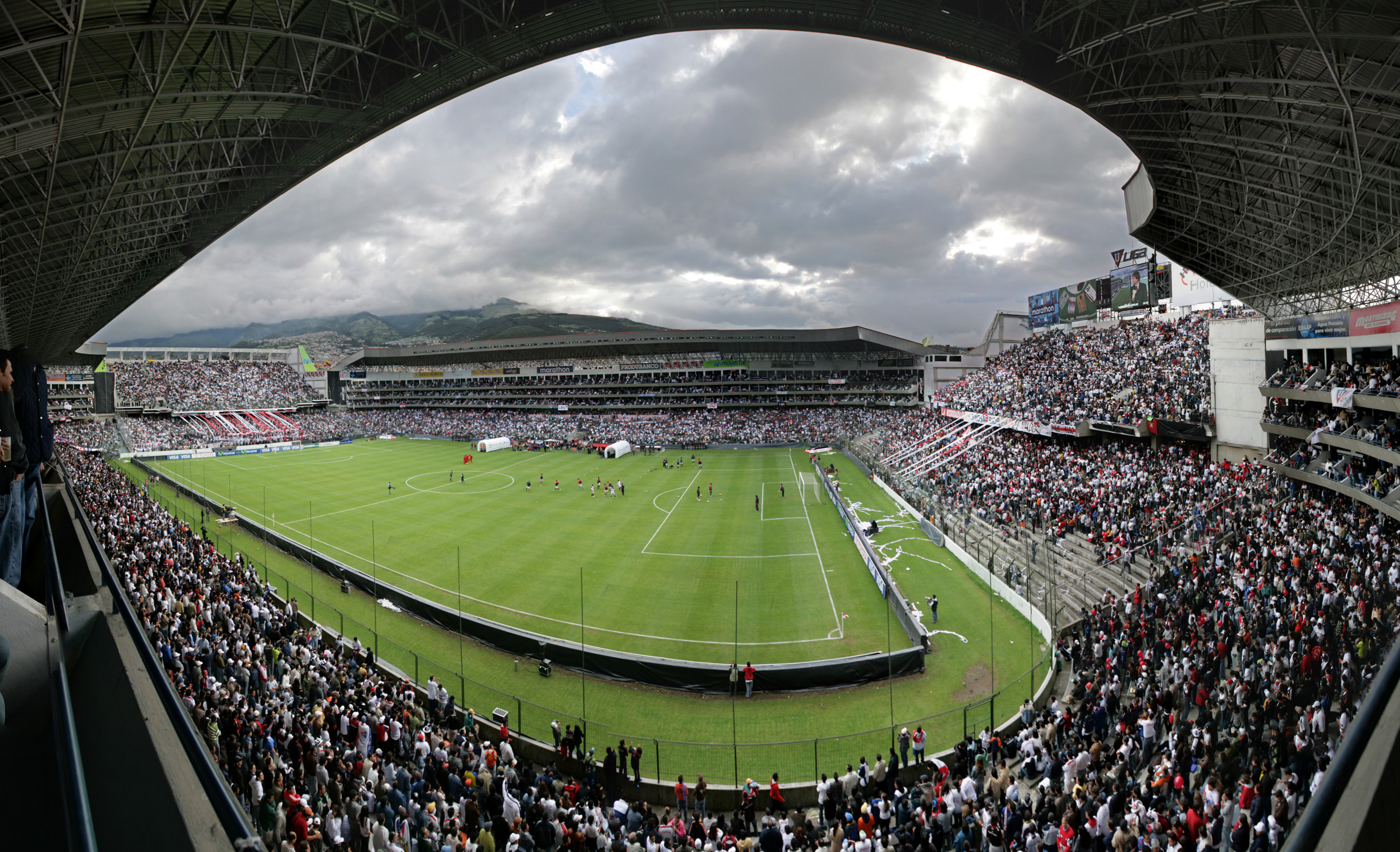
- Interactive map of Estadio Rodrigo Paz Delgado
- Full name: Estadio Rodrigo Paz Delgado
- Former names: Estadio Liga Deportiva Universitaria (1997–2017)
- Location: Av. John F. Kennedy and Gustavo Lemos; Cotocollao, Quito
- Coordinates: 0°6′28″S 78°29′21″W
- Owner: LDU Quito
- Operator: LDU Quito
- Capacity: 41,575
- Surface: GrassMaster
- Scoreboard: Yes
- Field size: 105 x 68 m

Construction
- Groundbreaking: March 1995
- Built: 1995–1997
- Opened: 6 March 1997
- Cost: $16 million
- Architect: Ricardo Mórtola
- Structural engineer: Edwin Ripalda

Tenants
- LDU Quito (1997–present); Ecuador national football team (2020–present)

Estadio Rodrigo Paz Delgado, commonly called La Casa Blanca (Spanish for "The White House"), is a football stadium in Quito, Ecuador, that is the home ground of LDU Quito. Built between 1995 and 1997, the stadium hosted its first match on 6 March 1997, between LDU Quito and Atlético Mineiro of Belo Horizonte. At an altitude of 2,734 m and with a capacity of 41,575, it is the largest stadium in Quito, and the second largest in Ecuador after the Estadio Monumental Banco Pichincha in Guayaquil.

Since its inauguration, the stadium has been the home of LDU Quito, during which time the club has won six national titles and four international titles.

The Ecuador national team used this stadium twice during the 2002 FIFA World Cup qualification on 29 March 2000 against Venezuela, and 15 August 2000 against Bolivia. Ecuador won both games.

== Images ==
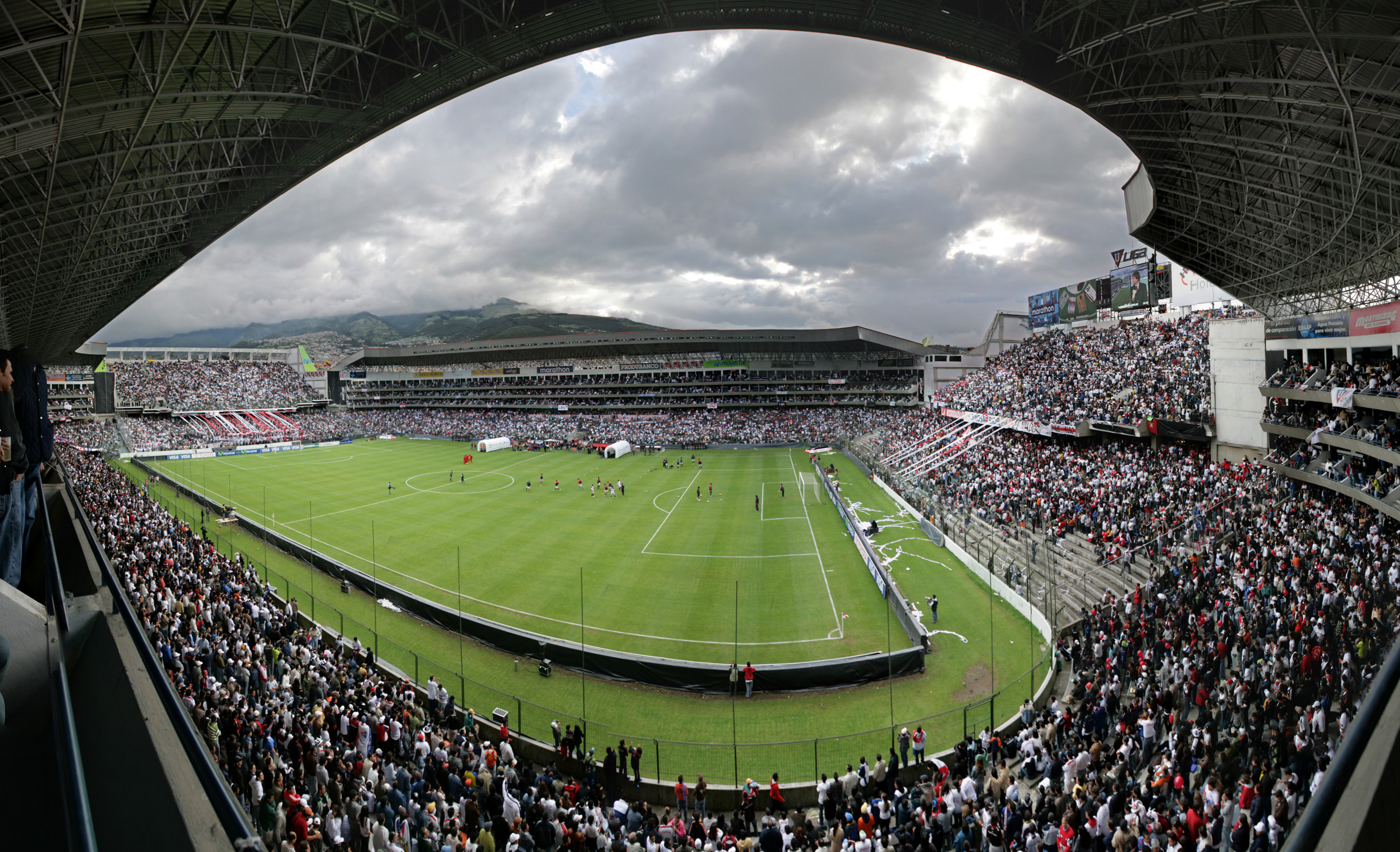
A panoramic view from a suite; LDU Quito hosting San Lorenzo for a 2008 Copa Libertadores match.

== First match ==
6 March 1997
18:00

LDU Quito (Ecuador)	3–1	(Brazil) Atlético Mineiro
Ferreira 31'; Guevara 72'; Hurtado 89'		Nino 52'

Estadio de Liga Deportiva Universitaria, Quito
Referee: Carlos Chandía (Chile)
