= 2011 Barcelona Sporting Club season =

Ecuadorian football club season

Barcelona SC
2011 season
- President: Alfonso Harb; Antonio Noboa
- Manager: Rubén Darío Insúa; Álex Aguinaga; Walter Guerrero; Luis Zubeldía
- Stadium: Estadio Monumental Banco Pichicha
- Serie A: First Stage: 8th Second Stage: 2nd Overall: 5th
- Top goalscorer: Iván Borghello (10 goals)
- Highest home attendance: 45,244; (October 26 v. LDU Quito)
- Lowest home attendance: 1,408; (March 6 v. ESPOLI)
- Average home league attendance: 10,211

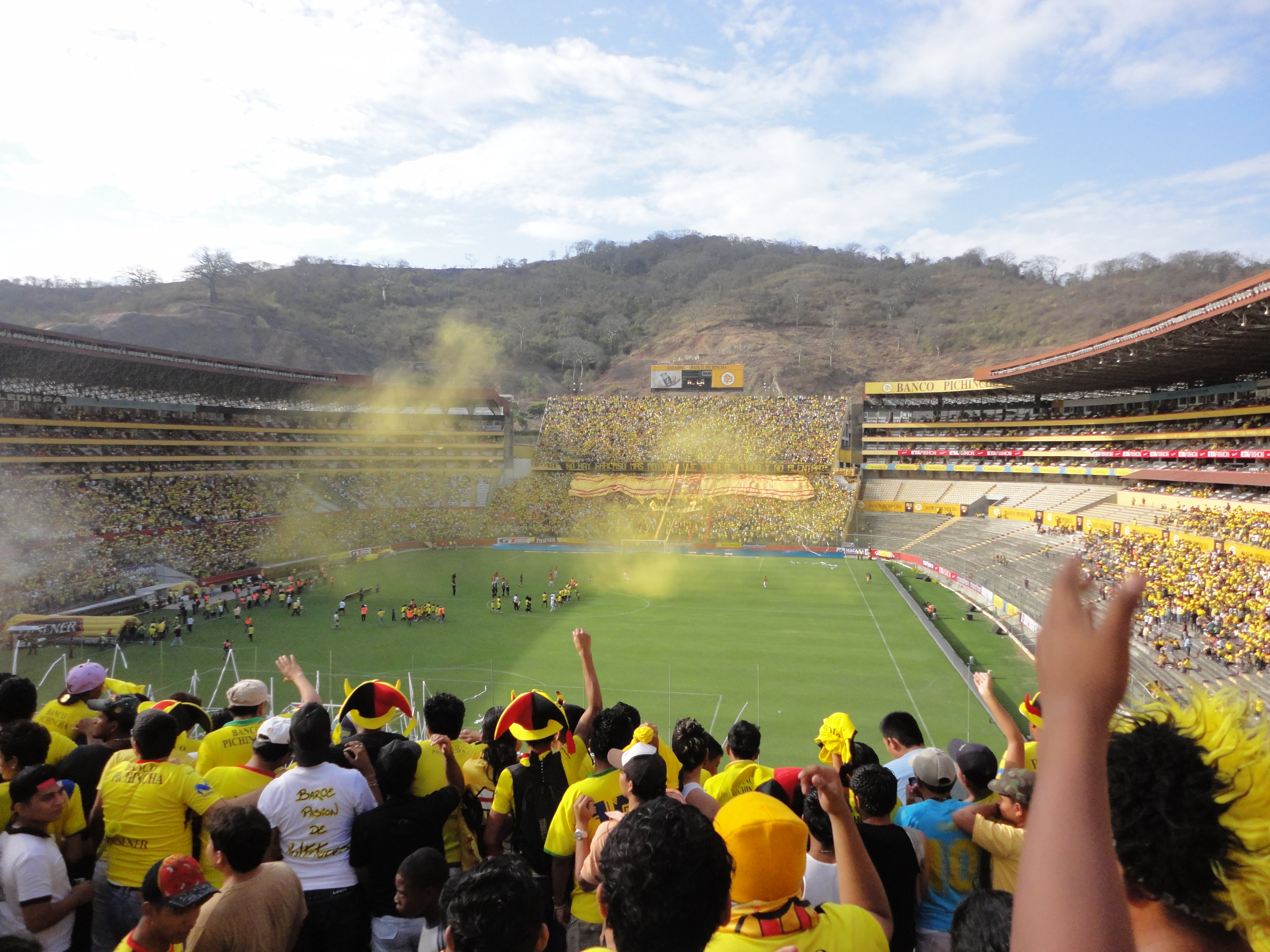
Match at the Estadio Monumental Isidro Romero Carbo (Banco Pichincha Stadium) between Barcelona Sporting Club and Club Deportivo Cuenca. The match took place on September 25, 2011, and ended in a 2-1 victory for Barcelona. The photo captures the moments before the teams took to the field.

Barcelona Sporting Club's 2011 season was the club's 86th year of existence, the 58th year in professional football, and the 53rd in the top level of professional football in Ecuador. In the first stage of the Serie A, Barcelona finished 8th and failed to qualify to the season-ending finals. In the Second Stage, the club finished 2nd and failed again to qualify to the season-ending finals because of the overall board.

== Competitions ==
=== Pre-season friendlies ===
Barcelona played three friendly matches in addition to La Noche Amarilla, the club's official presentation for the season. Their opponent for La Noche Amarilla was Deportes Tolima from Colombia.

January 19 Noche; Amarilla	Barcelona	0–0	Deportes Tolima	Guayaquil
19:30 UTC−05:00				Stadium: Banco Pichincha; Attendance: 50,000; Referee: Daniel Salazar

January 22	Barcelona	1–2	Deportes Tolima	Machala
16:00 UTC−05:00	Oyola 72' (pen.)		Castillo 38'; 39'	Stadium: 9 de Mayo; Attendance: 14,000; Referee: Robinson Galarza

January 25	Deportivo Quevedo	0–1	Barcelona	Quevedo
16:00 UTC−05:00			Caicedo 51'	Stadium: 7 de Octubre; Attendance: 10,000; Referee: Jhon Álvarez

=== Serie A ===
==== First stage ====
The First Stage of the season ran from January 30 to June 19. Barcelona finished 8th and failed to qualify to the season-ending Finals and the 2012 Copa Libertadores during this stage.

Overall								Home						Away					
Pld	W	D	L	GF	GA	GD	Pts	W	D	L	GF	GA	GD	W	D	L	GF	GA	GD
22	6	9	7	22	23	−1	27	3	5	3	12	8	+4	3	4	4	10	15	−5

Round	1	2	3	4	5	6	7	8	9	10	11	12	13	14	15	16	17	18	19	20	21	22
Ground	H	A	H	A	H	A	H	A	H	A	A	H	H	A	H	A	H	A	H	A	H	A
Result	W	L	D	D	D	D	W	D	L	L	W	D	W	L	D	W	L	D	L	L	D	W
Position	5	7	6	6	9	6	7	5	6	9	7	7	5	5	6	6	7	7	8	9	8	8

A = Away; H = Home; W = Win; D = Draw; L = Loss

January 30 Round 1	Barcelona	1–0	Imbabura	Guayaquil
17:00	Marangoni 24'	Report		Stadium: Estadio Monumental Banco Pichincha; Attendance: 15,463; Referee: José Carpio

February 6 Round 2	LDU Quito	3–0	Barcelona	Quito
11:30	Caicedo 4'; Cevallos, Jr. 44'; Barcos 69'	Report		Stadium: Estadio Casa Blanca; Attendance: 26,615; Referee: Daniel Salazar

February 12 Round 3	Barcelona	1–1	Manta	Guayaquil
17:30	Teixeira 34'	Report	Ramírez 57'	Stadium: Estadio Monumental Banco Pichincha; Attendance: 6,684; Referee: Diego Lara

February 16 Round 4	El Nacional	0–0	Barcelona	Quito
18:00		Report		Stadium: Estadio Olímpico Atahualpa; Attendance: 12,729; Referee: Samuel Haro

March 2 Round 5	Barcelona	0–0	Emelec	Guayaquil
19:30		Report		Stadium: Estadio Monumental Banco Pichincha; Attendance: 20,657; Referee: José Espinel

February 27 Round 6	Deportivo Cuenca	1–1	Barcelona	Cuenca
11:00	Godoy 44'	Report	Wila 65'	Stadium: Estadio Alejandro Serrano Aguilar; Attendance: 15,281; Referee: Sandro Vera

March 6 Round 7	Barcelona	4–1	ESPOLI	Guayaquil
17:00	Caicedo 2'; Perlaza 52'; Borghello 73'; Angulo 85'	Report	Nazareno 68'	Stadium: Estadio Monumental Banco Pichincha; Attendance: 1,408; Referee: Omar Ponce

March 9 Round 8	LDU Loja	0–0	Barcelona	Loja
20:15		Report		Stadium: Estadio Federativo Reina del Cisne; Attendance: 14,917; Referee: Miguel Hidalgo

March 13 Round 9	Barcelona	0–1	Deportivo Quito	Guayaquil
17:00		Report	Bavacqua 35'	Stadium: Estadio Monumental Banco Pichincha; Attendance: 7.484; Referee: Miguel Hidalgo

March 20 Round 10	Olmedo	4-0	Barcelona	Guayaquil
17:00	Valencia 32'; Pizzichillo 36'; Murillo 44', 76'	Report		Stadium: Estadio Olímpico de Riobamba; Attendance: 4.096; Referee: Samuel Haro

April 2 Round 11	Independiente José Terán	2-3	Barcelona	Sangolqui
13:30	Samaniego 1'; Mina 68'	Report	Maragoni 12'; Matamoros 22' de la Torre 84'	Stadium: Estadio Rumiñahui; Attendance: 7.619; Referee: Roddy Zambrano

April 10 Round 12	Barcelona	1-1	Independiente del Valle	Guayaquil
17:00	Marangoni 15'	Report	Estigarribia 67'	Stadium: Est. Banco Pichincha; Attendance: 13.308; Referee: Omar Ponce

April 16 Round 13	Barcelona	4-0	Olmedo	Machala
19:00	Borghello 11', 49'; Hurtado 19'; Teixeira 90'	Report		Stadium: Est. Nueve de Mayo; Attendance: 12.383; Referee: Miguel Hidalgo

April 24 Round 14	Deportivo Quito	1-0	Barcelona	Quito
11:30	Morales 17'	Report		Stadium: Est. Olímpico Atahualpa; Attendance: 19.957; Referee: José Carpio

April 27 Round 15	Barcelona	1-1	Liga de Loja	Machala
19:30	Angulo 9'	Report	Fábio Renato 87' (pen.)	Stadium: Est. Nueve de Mayo; Attendance: 11.270; Referee: Samuel Haro

May 1 Round 16	Espoli	2-3	Barcelona	Sto. Domingo
15:00	Gómez 22', 89'	Report	Borghello 17'; Wila 74'; Angulo 80'	Stadium: Est. Etho Vega; Attendance: 9.500; Referee: Alfredo Intriago

May 5 Round 17	Barcelona	0-2	Deportivo Cuenca	Guayaquil
19:30		Report	Ayala 16', 20'	Stadium: Est. Banco Pichincha; Attendance: 6.055; Referee: Miguel Hidalgo

May 15 Round 18	Emelec	1-1	Barcelona	Guayaquil
17:30	Méndez 54' (pen.)	Report	Marangoni 18' (pen.)	Stadium: Est. George Capwell; Attendance: 20.779; Referee: Diego Lara

May 18 Round 19	Barcelona	0-1	El Nacional	Guayaquil
19:30		Report	Anangonó 85'	Stadium: Est. Banco Pichincha; Attendance: 2.637; Referee: Alfredo Intriago

May 22 Round 20	Manta F.C.	1-0	Barcelona	Manta
16:00	Mera 64'	Report		Stadium: Est. Jocay; Attendance: 2.601; Referee: José Espinel

June 12 Round 21	Barcelona	0-0	Liga de Quito	Guayaquil
17:00		Report		Stadium: Est. Banco Pichincha; Attendance: 8.100; Referee: José Carpio

June 19 Round 22	Imbabura S.C.	0-2	Barcelona	Ibarra
12:00		Report	Wila 56'; Palacios 65'	Stadium: Est. Olímpico; Attendance: 5.984; Referee: José Espinel

==== Second stage ====
Overall								Home						Away					
Pld	W	D	L	GF	GA	GD	Pts	W	D	L	GF	GA	GD	W	D	L	GF	GA	GD
22	12	4	6	29	21	+8	40	10	0	1	19	6	+13	2	4	5	10	15	−5

Round	1	2	3	4	5	6	7	8	9	10	11	12	13	14	15	16	17	18	19	20	21	22
Ground	A	H	A	H	A	H	A	H	A	H	H	A	A	H	A	H	A	H	A	H	A	H
Result	D	W	L	W	D	W	D	W	L	W	W	D	W	W	L	L	L	W	W	W	L	W
Position	6	2	6	3	5	3	4	2	4	2	2	2	2	2	2	4	4	3	2	2	2	2

A = Away; H = Home; W = Win; D = Draw; L = Loss

January 30 Round 1	Barcelona	1:0 (1:0)	Imbabura S.C.	Guayaquil
17:00	Marangoni 24' (pen.)	Report		Stadium: Est. Banco Pichincha; Attendance: 15.463; Referee: José Carpio

February 6 Round 2	Liga de Quito	3:0 (2:0)	Barcelona	Quito
11:30	Caicedo 3'; Cevallos 43'; Barcos 68'	Report		Stadium: Est. Casa Blanca; Attendance: 26.615; Referee: Daniel Salazar

February 12 Round 3	Barcelona	1:1 (1:0)	Manta F.C.	Guayaquil
17:00	Teixeira 34'	Report	Ramírez 57'	Stadium: Est. Banco Pichincha; Attendance: 6,684; Referee: Diego Lara

February 16 Round 4	El Nacional	0:0 (0:0)	Barcelona	Quito
18:00		Report		Stadium: Est. Olímpico Atahualpa; Attendance: 12.729; Referee: Samuel Haro

March 2 Round 5	Barcelona	0:0 (0:0)	Emelec	Guayaquil
19:30		Report		Stadium: Est. Banco Pichincha; Attendance: 20.657; Referee: José Espinel

February 27 Round 6	Deportivo Cuenca	1:1 (1:0)	Barcelona	Cuenca
11:00	Godoy 44'	Report	Wila 65'	Stadium: Est. Alejandro Serrano A. Attendance: 15.281; Referee: Sandro Vera

March 6 Round 7	Barcelona	4:1 (1:0)	Espoli	Guayaquil
17:00	Caicedo 2'; Perlaza 52'; Borghello 73'; Angulo 85'	Report	Nazareno 68'	Stadium: Est. Banco Pichincha; Attendance: 1,408; Referee: Omar Ponce

March 9 Round 8	Liga de Loja	0:0 (0:0)	Barcelona	Loja
20:15		Report		Stadium: Est. Reina del Cisne; Attendance: 14.917; Referee: Miguel Hidalgo

March 13 Round 9	Barcelona	0:1 (0:1)	Deportivo Quito	Guayaquil
17:00		Report	Bevacqua 35'	Stadium: Est. Banco Pichincha; Attendance: 7,484; Referee: José Espinel

March 20 Round 10	Olmedo	4:0 (3:0)	Barcelona	Riobamba
12:00	Valencia 32'; Pizzichillo 36'; Murillo 44', 76'	Report		Stadium: Est. Olímpico de Riobamba; Attendance: 4,096; Referee: Samuel Haro

April 2 Round 11	Independiente del Valle	2:3 (1:2)	Barcelona	Sangolquí
13:30	Mina 1'; Samaniego 68'	Report	Marangoni 12'; Matamoros 22'; De la Torre 84'	Stadium: Est. General Rumiñahui; Referee: Roddy Zambrano

April 10 Round 12	Barcelona	1:1 (1:0)	Independiente del Valle	Guayaquil
17:00	Marangoni 15'	Report	Estigarribia 67'	Stadium: Est. Banco Pichincha; Attendance: 13.308; Referee: Omar Ponce

April 16 Round 13	Barcelona	4:0 (2:0)	Olmedo	Machala
19:00	Borghello 11', 49'; Hurtado 19'; Teixeira 90'	Report		Stadium: Est. Nueve de Mayo; Attendance: 12.383; Referee: Miguel Hidalgo

24 de abril Round 14	Deportivo Quito	1:0 (1:0)	Barcelona	Quito
11:30	Morales 17'	Report		Stadium: Est. Olímpico Atahualpa; Attendance: 19.957; Referee: José Carpio

27 de abril Round 15	Barcelona	1:1 (1:0)	Liga de Loja	Machala
19:30	Angulo 9'	Report	Fábio Renato 87' (pen.)	Stadium: Est. Nueve de Mayo; Attendance: 11.270; Referee: Samuel Haro

1 de mayo Round 16	Espoli	2:3 (1:1)	Barcelona	Sto. Domingo
15:00	Gómez 22', 89'	Report	Borghello 17'; Wila 74'; Angulo 80'	Stadium: Est. Etho Vega; Attendance: 9,500; Referee: Alfredo Intriago

5 de mayo Round 17	Barcelona	0:2 (0:2)	Deportivo Cuenca	Guayaquil
19:30		Report	Ayala 16', 20'	Stadium: Est. Banco Pichincha; Attendance: 6,055; Referee: Miguel Hidalgo

15 de mayo Round 18	Emelec	1:1 (0:1)	Barcelona	Guayaquil
17:30	Méndez 54' (pen.)	Report	Marangoni 18' (pen.)	Stadium: Est. George Capwell; Attendance: 20.779; Referee: Diego Lara

18 de mayo Round 19	Barcelona	0:1 (0:0)	El Nacional	Guayaquil
19:30		Report	Anangonó 85'	Stadium: Est. Banco Pichincha; Attendance: 2,637; Referee: Alfredo Intriago

22 de mayo Round 20	Manta F.C.	1:0 (0:0)	Barcelona	Manta
16:00	Mera 64'	Report		Stadium: Est. Jocay; Attendance: 2,601; Referee: José Espinel

12 de junio Round 21	Barcelona	0:0 (0:0)	Liga de Quito	Guayaquil
17:00		Report		Stadium: Est. Banco Pichincha; Attendance: 8,100; Referee: José Carpio

19 de junio Round 22	Imbabura S.C.	0:2 (0:0)	Barcelona	Ibarra
12:00		Report	Wila 56'; Palacios 65'	Stadium: Est. Olímpico; Attendance: 5,984; Referee: José Espinel

=== Other friendlies ===
January 9	Liga de Portoviejo	1:1 (1:0)	Barcelona	Portoviejo
20:00	Flores 33'		García 68'	Stadium: Est. Reales Tamarindos; Attendance: 10.000

February 20	Técnico Universitario	1:2 (1:0)	Barcelona	Ambato
	Valle 13'		Angulo 67'; Wila 89'	Stadium: Est. Bellavista; Attendance: 3,000

March 27	Brasilia	1:3 (1:1)	Barcelona	Quinindé
20:00	Cuero 20'		Caicedo 37'; Teixeira 46'; Wila 85'	Stadium: Est. Pascual Mina

July 7	Ecuador Sub-20	0:1	Barcelona	Quito
			Angulo	Stadium: Casa de la selección

July 7	Ecuador Sub-20	3:1	Barcelona	Quito
				Stadium: Casa de la selección

July 10	Emelec	0:1 (0:0)	Barcelona	Portoviejo
16:00			Angulo 52'	Stadium: Est. Reales Tamarindos; Referee: Sandro Vera

July 17	Barcelona	2:0 (1:0)	Emelec	Machala
12:00	Palacios 41'; Wila 57'			Stadium: Est. Nueve de Mayo; Attendance: 17.000; Referee: Robinson Galarza

November 12	Emelec	3:0 (2:0)	Barcelona	Puerto Ayora
15:30	A. Angulo 30'; R. Campos 42'; D. Hurtado 90'			Stadium: Stadium Jefferson Pérez

November 13	Barcelona	1:1 (0:0) (2-1 p)	Emelec	Puerto Baquerizo Moreno
16:00	Palacios		N. Angulo	Stadium: Stadium La Pampa Colorada

== See also ==
- Barcelona Sporting Club
- 2011 in Ecuadorian football
