= 2026 LigaPro Serie A =

LigaPro Serie A
- Season: 2026
- Dates: 20 February – 13 December 2026
- Champions: Independiente del Valle (3rd title)
- Copa Libertadores: Independiente del Valle; Macará; Universidad Católica (via Copa Ecuador)
- Copa Sudamericana: Libertad; Guayaquil City
- Matches: 293
- Goals: 688 (2.35 per match)
- Top goalscorer: Franco Posse (17 goals)
- Biggest home win: Ind. del Valle 6–1 Emelec (19 July); U. Católica 5–0 T. Universitario (1 August)
- Biggest away win: Aucas 0–4 Barcelona (25 October)
- Highest scoring: Ind. del Valle 6–1 Emelec (19 July); Orense 4–3 Guayaquil City (7 September)
- All statistics correct as of 22 November 2026.

The 2026 Campeonato Ecuatoriano de Fútbol Serie A, known as the 2026 Liga Ecuabet for sponsorship purposes, is the 68th season of the Serie A, Ecuador's top tier football league, and the eighth under the management of the Liga Profesional de Fútbol del Ecuador (or LigaPro). The season began on 20 February and is scheduled to end on 13 December 2026.

The defending champions Independiente del Valle won their third league title and second in a row in this season, clinching the championship with four rounds to go after a 2–2 draw for Macará against Universidad Católica on 8 November 2026.

== Format changes ==
The format for the 2026 season was approved by the Council of Presidents of LigaPro on 15 December 2025. The tournament retained its two-stage setup, but with minor changes to the final stages: in the first stage the 16 participating teams played each other twice (once at home and once away) for a total of 30 matches, and teams were sorted according to their placement into two hexagonals and one quadrangular group for the final stages.

The top six teams play the first hexagonal in which they will play each other twice to decide the season champions as well as three Copa Libertadores berths and three Copa Sudamericana ones, while the group in which the last berth to the Copa Sudamericana will be decided was downsized from six to four teams, those being the ones placing from seventh to tenth place in the first stage. The bottom six teams play a hexagonal to decide the two teams that will be relegated to Serie B at the end of the season.

Although points from the first stage were still carried over to the final stage, this time the top team at the end of the first stage was not assured of qualification for the Copa Libertadores group stage.

== Teams ==
=== Team changes ===
Sixteen teams compete in the season, the top 14 teams from the 2025 LigaPro Serie A and the top two teams of the 2025 Ecuadorian Serie B. Técnico Universitario and Vinotinto Ecuador were relegated from Serie A after finishing in the bottom two places of the relegation group of the previous season, and were replaced by the second tier champions Guayaquil City and runners-up Leones. Guayaquil City returned to the Serie A after two seasons with three matches to go after a 3–1 win over San Antonio on 12 October 2025, whilst Leones clinched a first-ever promotion to the top flight with one match left on 24 October, after Gualaceo was deducted nine points due to match-fixing.

Although El Nacional avoided relegation on sporting merit, they were administratively relegated to Serie B on 16 December 2025 after defaulting on payments to their creditors on three occasions. The decision caused the club to place last in the 2025 season, thus sparing Técnico Universitario from relegation, which was ultimately confirmed on 9 January 2026.

=== Stadia and locations ===
Locations of the 2026 Serie A clubs.

Team	City	Stadium	Capacity
Aucas	Quito	Cooprogreso Gonzalo Pozo Ripalda	21,689
Barcelona	Guayaquil	Monumental Banco Pichincha	57,267
Delfín	Manta	Jocay	21,000
Deportivo Cuenca	Cuenca	Banco del Austro Alejandro Serrano Aguilar	18,549
Emelec	Guayaquil	George Capwell Banco del Austro	40,020
Guayaquil City	Guayaquil	Christian Benítez	10,152
Independiente del Valle	Quito	Banco Guayaquil	12,000
LDU Quito	Quito	Rodrigo Paz Delgado	41,575
Leones	Atuntaqui	Olímpico Jaime Terán	10,000
Leones	Ibarra	Olímpico de Ibarra	18,600
Libertad	Loja	Reina del Cisne	14,935
Macará	Ambato	Bellavista Universidad Indoamérica	16,467
Manta	Manta	Jocay	21,000
Mushuc Runa	Ambato	COAC Mushuc Runa	8,200
Orense	Machala	Banco de Machala 9 de Mayo	16,456
Técnico Universitario	Ambato	Bellavista Universidad Indoamérica	16,467
Universidad Católica	Quito	Olímpico Atahualpa	35,258

=== Personnel and kits ===
Team	Manager	Kit manufacturer	Shirt sponsor
Aucas	(Ecuador) Norberto Araujo	Lotto	
Barcelona	(Argentina) Pablo Trobbiani	Marathon	Pilsener, Discover Card, 1xBet
Delfín	(Ecuador) Juan Carlos León	Baldo's	
Deportivo Cuenca	(Argentina) Andrés Yllana	Lotto	Banco del Austro, Chubb Seguros
Emelec	(Argentina) Ezequiel Medrán	Adidas	SOLCA
Guayaquil City	(Ecuador) Pool Gavilánez	Astro	Ecuabet, Zamofruit Company
Independiente del Valle	(Uruguay) Joaquín Papa	Marathon	Banco Guayaquil, Chubb Seguros, 1xBet
LDU Quito	(Argentina) Gustavo Álvarez	Puma	Banco Pichincha
Leones	(Argentina) Matías Córdoba	Umbro	Isuzu, San Francisco COAC Ltda.
Libertad	(Argentina) Jorge Célico	Macón Sport	Grand Aviation
Macará	(Uruguay) Guillermo Sanguinetti	Boman	San Francisco COAC Ltda, DFSK, Betgaliano
Manta	(Paraguay) Raúl Duarte	Boman	Atún Isabel, Terminal Portuaria de Manta, Tadel S.A.
Mushuc Runa	(Ecuador) Paúl Vélez	Boman	Mushuc Runa COAC
Orense	(Colombia) Juan Pablo Buch	Elohim	Banco de Machala, IncarPalm
Técnico Universitario	(Uruguay) Francisco Usúcar	Vaz Sport	San Francisco COAC Ltda.
Universidad Católica	(Ecuador) Diego Martínez	Umbro	Fundación Crisfe

=== Managerial changes ===
Team	Outgoing manager	Manner of departure	Date of vacancy	Position in table	Incoming manager	Date of appointment
First stage
Técnico Universitario	(Colombia) Alejandro Cortez	End of caretaker spell	29 November 2025	Pre-season	(Uruguay) Francisco Usúcar	9 January 2026
Deportivo Cuenca	(Ecuador) Norberto Araujo	End of contract	20 December 2025	Pre-season	(Argentina) Jorge Célico	23 December 2025
Independiente del Valle	(Spain) Javier Rabanal	End of contract	21 December 2025	Pre-season	(Uruguay) Joaquín Papa	17 December 2025
Leones	(Ecuador) Giovanny Espinoza	Demoted to assistant manager	1 January 2026	Pre-season	(Ecuador) Édison Méndez	1 January 2026
Aucas	(Colombia) Juan Pablo Buch	Sacked	4 January 2026	Pre-season	(Ecuador) Norberto Araujo	9 January 2026
Barcelona	(Spain) Ismael Rescalvo	Sacked	5 January 2026	Pre-season	(Venezuela) César Farías	7 January 2026
Emelec	(Argentina) Guillermo Duró	Mutual agreement	3 February 2026	Pre-season	(Uruguay) Vicente Sánchez	5 February 2026
Orense	(Argentina) Raúl Antuña	Mutual agreement	6 March 2026	12th	(Argentina) Agustín Robles (Note: Caretaker manager.)	6 March 2026
Orense	(Argentina) Agustín Robles	End of caretaker spell	23 March 2026	13th	(Colombia) Hernán Torres	23 March 2026
Libertad	(Ecuador) Juan Carlos León	Sacked	4 May 2026	14th	(Colombia) Juan Pablo Buch	4 May 2026
Emelec	(Uruguay) Vicente Sánchez	Mutual agreement	14 May 2026	12th	(Argentina) Cristian Nasuti (Note: Originally as caretaker manager, appointed on a permanent basis on 4 June 2026.)	14 May 2026
Delfín	(Argentina) Juan Zubeldía	Resigned	30 May 2026	15th	(Ecuador) Juan Carlos León	9 June 2026
Leones	(Ecuador) Édison Méndez	Sacked	5 June 2026	13th	(Argentina) Matías Córdoba	8 June 2026
Técnico Universitario	(Uruguay) Francisco Usúcar	Resigned	27 June 2026	9th	(Colombia) Bernardo Redín	27 June 2026
LDU Quito	(Brazil) Tiago Nunes	Sacked	16 July 2026	6th	(Ecuador) Patricio Hurtado	16 July 2026
Orense	(Colombia) Hernán Torres	Mutual agreement	20 July 2026	13th	(Argentina) Agustín Robles (Note: Originally as caretaker manager, confirmed as permanent manager for the remainder of the season on 30 July 2026.)	20 July 2026
Deportivo Cuenca	(Argentina) Jorge Célico	Mutual agreement	24 July 2026	9th	(Argentina) Daniel Néculman	25 July 2026
LDU Quito	(Ecuador) Patricio Hurtado	End of caretaker spell	26 July 2026	6th	(Argentina) Gustavo Álvarez	24 July 2026
Manta	(Ecuador) Javier Carvajal	Resigned	30 July 2026	16th	(Ecuador) David Mero	31 July 2026
Barcelona	(Venezuela) César Farías	Sacked	10 August 2026	5th	(Argentina) Pablo Trobbiani	11 August 2026
Manta	(Ecuador) David Mero	End of caretaker spell	11 August 2026	16th	(Paraguay) Raúl Duarte	11 August 2026
Técnico Universitario	(Colombia) Bernardo Redín	Sacked	11 August 2026	14th	(Argentina) Ismael Blanco (Note: Andrés Galarza was the caretaker manager for the first stage round 25 match against Emelec.)	16 August 2026
Emelec	(Argentina) Cristian Nasuti	Mutual agreement	27 August 2026	12th	(Argentina) Ezequiel Medrán	27 August 2026
Deportivo Cuenca	(Argentina) Daniel Néculman	Sacked	8 September 2026	12th	(Argentina) Diego Bonelli	8 September 2026
Deportivo Cuenca	(Argentina) Diego Bonelli	End of caretaker spell	17 September 2026	12th	(Argentina) Andrés Yllana	17 September 2026
Final stages
Orense	(Argentina) Agustín Robles	Sacked	24 September 2026	3rd, relegation hexagonal	(Colombia) Juan Pablo Buch	24 September 2026
Libertad	(Colombia) Juan Pablo Buch	Signed by Orense	24 September 2026	1st, Copa Sudamericana group	(Argentina) Jorge Célico	25 September 2026
Técnico Universitario	(Argentina) Ismael Blanco	Mutual agreement	22 October 2026	5th, relegation hexagonal	(Uruguay) Francisco Usúcar	22 October 2026

== First stage ==
The first stage began on 20 February and ended on 14 September 2026.

=== Standings ===
Pos	Team	Pld	W	D	L	GF	GA	GD	Pts	Qualification
1	Independiente del Valle	30	24	2	4	73	33	+40	74	Advance to Championship hexagonal
2	Universidad Católica	30	14	9	7	51	27	+24	51	Advance to Championship hexagonal
3	Macará	30	15	6	9	41	33	+8	51	Advance to Championship hexagonal
4	Aucas	30	14	8	8	33	28	+5	50	Advance to Championship hexagonal
5	LDU Quito	30	13	7	10	31	24	+7	46	Advance to Championship hexagonal
6	Barcelona	30	11	11	8	32	25	+7	44	Advance to Championship hexagonal
7	Libertad	30	11	8	11	33	34	−1	41	Advance to Copa Sudamericana group
8	Leones	30	10	9	11	31	32	−1	39	Advance to Copa Sudamericana group
9	Guayaquil City	30	10	9	11	33	36	−3	39	Advance to Copa Sudamericana group
10	Emelec	30	10	9	11	25	34	−9	39	Advance to Copa Sudamericana group
11	Mushuc Runa	30	9	11	10	35	38	−3	38	Advance to Relegation hexagonal
12	Deportivo Cuenca	30	10	6	14	25	37	−12	36	Advance to Relegation hexagonal
13	Orense	30	9	6	15	36	47	−11	33	Advance to Relegation hexagonal
14	Técnico Universitario	30	10	2	18	28	42	−14	32	Advance to Relegation hexagonal
15	Delfín	30	7	7	16	19	31	−12	28	Advance to Relegation hexagonal
16	Manta	30	5	6	19	17	42	−25	21	Advance to Relegation hexagonal

Source: LigaPro, Soccerway
Rules for classification: 1) Points, 2) Goal difference, 3) Goals for, 4) Away goals for, 5) Head-to-head record, 6) Drawing of lots.

=== Results ===
Home \ Away	AUC	BSC	DEL	CUE	EME	GYC	IDV	LDQ	LEO	LIB	MAC	MAN	MUS	ORE	TEC	CAT
Aucas	—	1–1	1–0	0–1	2–0	1–0	0–3	0–1	3–0	1–0	1–4	3–1	1–1	3–2	0–1	2–1
Barcelona	3–0	—	1–1	2–0	1–0	1–1	2–1	0–1	2–1	1–0	1–2	1–1	2–1	3–0	1–0	1–1
Delfín	0–1	1–2	—	1–0	1–1	1–0	0–1	1–0	0–1	0–0	2–1	0–1	1–0	1–1	1–0	0–1
Deportivo Cuenca	0–1	2–1	1–0	—	2–1	1–0	2–3	1–1	1–1	0–1	1–1	1–2	0–0	1–3	2–1	0–2
Emelec	0–2	0–0	1–1	0–2	—	1–3	2–0	1–0	2–1	1–1	2–0	1–0	1–1	2–1	2–1	1–0
Guayaquil City	1–1	0–0	2–1	0–1	0–0	—	2–4	2–1	0–0	2–2	2–1	1–0	3–1	0–1	1–0	0–0
Independiente del Valle	2–2	1–0	3–2	1–0	6–1	2–0	—	0–2	2–1	2–3	3–1	4–0	3–1	2–0	3–0	2–2
LDU Quito	0–0	0–2	2–1	1–1	2–0	1–0	0–2	—	0–1	0–0	0–2	1–0	0–0	3–0	2–1	1–1
Leones	0–1	1–1	1–0	1–1	2–0	1–1	2–3	0–2	—	1–1	1–1	3–0	3–1	1–0	0–1	1–0
Libertad	3–2	0–0	1–0	0–1	1–1	0–1	2–3	2–1	1–3	—	1–0	1–0	2–2	3–0	1–0	2–1
Macará	0–1	3–1	1–0	3–0	1–0	2–1	0–3	1–0	0–0	3–0	—	4–3	2–1	1–2	1–1	1–1
Manta	0–0	2–0	0–1	0–1	0–0	0–1	0–2	1–1	0–2	2–1	0–1	—	1–2	0–0	0–2	1–0
Mushuc Runa	0–0	0–0	1–0	4–1	2–0	2–2	1–4	1–3	1–1	0–2	0–0	1–0	—	2–1	1–0	0–0
Orense	2–1	1–1	0–0	2–0	0–2	4–3	2–3	1–2	2–0	2–1	1–2	1–1	3–2	—	1–2	1–2
Técnico Universitario	0–1	1–0	4–0	3–1	0–1	2–3	1–2	1–3	2–1	2–1	0–2	1–0	0–3	1–1	—	0–2
Universidad Católica	1–1	2–1	2–2	1–0	1–1	4–1	2–3	1–0	3–0	2–0	4–0	5–1	2–3	2–1	5–0	—

Source: LigaPro, Soccerway
Legend: Blue = home team win; Yellow = draw; Red = away team win.

== Final stages ==
For the final stages, the teams were split into three groups according to their placement in the first stage. The top six teams in the first stage play the championship hexagonal, in which the championship as well as most of the international berths will be awarded, whilst the next four teams play a quadrangular for the final Copa Sudamericana berth. The bottom six teams play the relegation hexagonal, where the two worst placed teams will be relegated at the end of the season. Teams carried over their first stage records to the final stages.

The championship and relegation hexagonals began on 18 and 20 September and are scheduled to end on 13 December, whilst the Copa Sudamericana group was played from 19 September to 7 November 2026.

=== Championship hexagonal ===
Pos	Team	Pld	W	D	L	GF	GA	GD	Pts	Qualification	IDV	MAC	AUC	CAT	LDQ	BSC
1	Independiente del Valle (C, Q)	36	27	3	6	81	38	+43	84	Qualification for the Copa Libertadores group stage	—	0–1	2–1	0–0	2–0	
2	Macará (Q)	37	21	7	9	53	37	+16	70	Qualification for the Copa Libertadores group stage	1–0	—		2–2		3–0
3	Aucas	37	16	9	12	41	42	−1	57	Qualification for the Copa Libertadores second stage	2–4	1–2	—		1–1	0–4
4	Universidad Católica (T)	37	14	12	11	56	36	+20	54	Qualification for the Copa Libertadores first stage (Note: Universidad Católica qualified for the Copa Libertadores first stage as 2026 Copa Ecuador champions or runners-up. If they end the season in third place of the championship hexagonal, the Copa Libertadores first stage berth will pass to LDU Quito, as the Copa Ecuador's best losing semi-finalist.)		0–1	1–2	—		0–1
5	LDU Quito	37	15	9	13	38	33	+5	54	Qualification for the Copa Sudamericana first stage		1–2	0–1	2–1	—	2–1
6	Barcelona	36	13	13	10	40	32	+8	52	Qualification for the Copa Sudamericana first stage				1–1	1–1	—

Updated to match(es) played on 22 November 2026. Source: LigaPro, Soccerway
Legend: Blue = home team win; Yellow = draw; Red = away team win.
Rules for classification: 1) Points, 2) Goal difference, 3) Goals for, 4) Away goals for, 5) Head-to-head record, 6) Drawing of lots.
(C) Champions; (Q) Qualified for the phase indicated; (T) Qualified, but not yet for the particular phase indicated

=== Copa Sudamericana group ===
Pos	Team	Pld	W	D	L	GF	GA	GD	Pts	Qualification	LIB	GYC	LEO	EME
1	Libertad	36	14	9	13	43	40	+3	51	Qualification for the Copa Sudamericana first stage	—	4–0	3–0	0–1
2	Guayaquil City	36	12	12	12	39	44	−5	48	Qualification for the Copa Sudamericana first stage	0–0	—	1–1	3–2
3	Leones	36	12	11	13	40	41	−1	47		4–1	1–1	—	1–3
4	Emelec	36	12	9	15	32	43	−11	45		1–2	0–1	0–2	—

Source: LigaPro, Soccerway
Legend: Blue = home team win; Yellow = draw; Red = away team win.
Rules for classification: 1) Points, 2) Goal difference, 3) Goals for, 4) Away goals for, 5) Head-to-head record, 6) Drawing of lots.

=== Relegation hexagonal ===
Pos	Team	Pld	W	D	L	GF	GA	GD	Pts	Relegation	CUE	MUS	TEC	ORE	DEL	MAN
1	Deportivo Cuenca	37	13	8	16	33	44	−11	47		—	1–1	2–1	2–0		
2	Mushuc Runa	37	11	13	13	46	52	−6	46			—		1–1	2–1	2–3
3	Técnico Universitario	37	12	4	21	37	49	−12	40		2–0	3–0	—		1–1	1–2
4	Orense	37	10	9	18	45	56	−11	39		0–0	2–3	1–1	—	4–0	
5	Delfín	37	10	9	18	33	45	−12	39	Relegation to Serie B	3–1	3–2			—	4–2
6	Manta	37	9	7	21	29	54	−25	34	Relegation to Serie B	0–2		1–0	2–1	2–2	—

Updated to match(es) played on 22 November 2026. Source: LigaPro, Soccerway
Legend: Blue = home team win; Yellow = draw; Red = away team win.
Rules for classification: 1) Points, 2) Goal difference, 3) Goals for, 4) Away goals for, 5) Head-to-head record, 6) Drawing of lots.

== Top scorers ==
As of 22 November 2026

Rank	Player	Club	Goals
1	(Uruguay) Franco Posse	Macará	17
2	(Ecuador) Ronie Carrillo	Mushuc Runa / Emelec	13
2	(Ecuador) Edinson Mero	Guayaquil City	13
2	(Ecuador) Vilinton Branda	Libertad	13
2	(Panama) José Fajardo	Universidad Católica	13
6	(Argentina) Franco Ayunta	Delfín	12
6	(Argentina) Agustín Campana	Macará	12
6	(Argentina) Agustín Herrera	Orense	12
9	(Paraguay) Carlos González	Independiente del Valle	11
9	(Ecuador) Juan Anangonó	Leones	11

Source: Futbolecuador

== See also ==
- 2026 Copa Ecuador
