= 2026 Copa Ecuador =

Copa Ecuador Banco Pichincha 2026

Tournament details
- Country: Ecuador
- Dates: 28 March – 2 December 2026
- Teams: 51
- Copa Libertadores: Universidad Católica

Tournament statistics
- Matches played: 51
- Goals scored: 126 (2.47 per match)
- Top goal scorer(s): Michael Estrada; José Fajardo (5 goals each)
- All statistics correct as of 5 November 2026.

The 2026 Copa Ecuador (officially known as the Copa Ecuador Banco Pichincha 2026 for sponsorship purposes) is the sixth edition of the Copa Ecuador, Ecuador's domestic football cup. It began on 28 March and is scheduled to end on 2 December 2026.

Universidad Católica are the defending champions.

== Format ==
For this season the competition was expanded from 49 to 51 teams, entering two additional sides from the amateur leagues but keeping the single-elimination format used in previous editions. The qualifying round was expanded to include four teams: two from the third-tier competition Segunda Categoría as well as two amateur sides, with the winners advancing to the first stage of the competition, in which 12 Ecuadorian Serie B teams, the remaining 18 Segunda Categoría ones and the amateur champions entered the competition. For this round, the involved clubs were drawn into 16 single-match ties to be hosted by the team competing in the lower tier, with the winners advancing to the second stage.

The 16 Serie A teams entered the competition in the round of 32, where they were drawn against the 16 winners from the previous round. The subsequent knockout rounds in the competition except for the semi-finals (which will be contested over two legs) will be played over a single leg to be hosted by the team from the lower tier, with the final being played on neutral ground.

== Prizes ==
The champions of this edition will qualify for the 2027 Copa Libertadores, taking the Ecuador 4 berth which will enable them to enter the first qualifying stage of that competition, and will also be entitled to play the 2027 Supercopa Ecuador against the 2026 LigaPro Serie A champions.

== Schedule ==
The schedule for the competition was presented by the Ecuadorian Football Federation on 27 March 2026.

Round	Draw date	Matches
Qualifying stage	27 March 2026	28–31 March 2026
First round	27 March 2026	7–24 April 2026
Round of 32	27 April 2026	12 May – 8 July 2026
Round of 16	27 April 2026	29 July – 20 August 2026
Quarter-finals	27 April 2026	26 August – 24 September 2026
Semi-finals	27 April 2026	28–29 October 2026 (1st leg); 4–5 November 2026 (2nd leg)
Final	27 April 2026	2 December 2026 (Cuenca)

== Teams ==
51 clubs will take part in this edition of the Copa Ecuador: 16 from Serie A, 12 from Serie B, 20 from Segunda Categoría, and 3 amateur teams.

=== Serie A ===
- Aucas
- Barcelona
- Delfín
- Deportivo Cuenca
- Emelec
- Guayaquil City
- Independiente del Valle
- LDU Quito
- Leones
- Libertad
- Macará
- Manta
- Mushuc Runa
- Orense
- Técnico Universitario
- Universidad Católica

=== Serie B ===
- 9 de Octubre
- 22 de Julio
- Atlético
- Cuenca Juniors
- Cumbayá
- Deportivo Santo Domingo
- El Nacional
- Gualaceo
- Independiente Juniors
- LDU Portoviejo
- San Antonio
- Vinotinto Ecuador

=== Segunda Categoría ===
- Africando
- Anaconda
- Astillero
- Baños Ciudad de Fuego
- Daquilema
- Deportivo Ibarra
- Deportivo Quito
- Dunamis 04
- Guaranda
- Huaquillas
- Independiente Azogues
- Insutec
- Juventud Italiana
- La Unión
- Loja City
- Nazareno
- Primero de Mayo
- Río Aguarico
- Santo Domingo
- Unión Deportiva Juvenil

=== Amateur teams ===
- 7 de Febrero
- Bejucal Sport
- Quito

== Qualifying stage ==
The qualifying stage was played by four teams: the two worst-placed teams in the 2025 Segunda Categoría's general standings and the amateur league runner-up and third-placed teams.

=== First qualifying round ===
For the first qualifying round, the two Segunda Categoría teams were drawn against the amateur sides in two ties, with the winning sides advancing to the second qualifying round. Matches in this round were played on 28 March 2026.

Team 1	Score	Team 2
Bejucal Sport	2–3	Primero de Mayo
7 de Febrero	1–0	Loja City

=== Second qualifying round ===
The two winners from the previous round played an additional match on 31 March 2026, with the winner advancing to the first round.

Team 1	Score	Team 2
7 de Febrero	0–1	Primero de Mayo

== First round ==
Twelve teams from Serie B, 18 teams from Segunda Categoría, and the amateur champion (Quito) entered the competition in the first round, along with the winning team from the qualifying stage. In this round, the team from the lower tier hosted the match.

Team 1	Score	Team 2
Nazareno	0–4	9 de Octubre
Unión Deportiva Juvenil	0–2	Daquilema
Juventud Italiana	2–1	Atlético
Guaranda	0–0 (3–4 p)	San Antonio
Insutec	3–3 (8–7 p)	Deportivo Ibarra
Independiente Azogues	0–5	LDU Portoviejo
Astillero	2–1	22 de Julio
Africando	1–2	Independiente Juniors
Baños Ciudad de Fuego	2–1	Anaconda
Dunamis 04	1–5	El Nacional
Deportivo Quito	0–1	Gualaceo
Santo Domingo	1–2	Vinotinto Ecuador
Quito	2–3	Cuenca Juniors
La Unión	0–0 (5–3 p)	Cumbayá
Primero de Mayo	0–2	Deportivo Santo Domingo
Huaquillas	1–0	Río Aguarico

== Bracket ==
Round of 32
Astillero	2
Guayaquil City	1
Daquilema (p)	0 (10)
Emelec	0 (9)
Vinotinto Ecuador	2
Orense	1
El Nacional	1
Universidad Católica	4
Independiente Juniors	1 (3)
LDU Quito (p)	1 (4)
Huaquillas	0
Leones	1
La Unión (p)	0 (8)
Deportivo Cuenca	0 (7)
San Antonio	0
Aucas	3
LDU Portoviejo (p)	1 (4)
Libertad	1 (2)
Insutec	2
Barcelona	4
Juventud Italiana	2
Técnico Universitario	0
Baños Ciudad de Fuego	0
Delfín	2
Gualaceo	1
Mushuc Runa	0
Cuenca Juniors	0
Macará	1
Deportivo Santo Domingo	0
Independiente del Valle	2
9 de Octubre	0 (3)
Manta (p)	0 (5)

Round of 16
Astillero	2
Daquilema	0
Vinotinto Ecuador	2
Universidad Católica	3
LDU Quito	6
Leones	0
La Unión	1 (3)
Aucas (p)	1 (4)
LDU Portoviejo (awd.)	3
Barcelona	0
Juventud Italiana	0
Delfín	1
Gualaceo (p)	1 (4)
Macará	1 (3)
Independiente del Valle	1
Manta	0

Quarter-finals
Astillero	0
Universidad Católica	1
LDU Quito	1
Aucas	0
LDU Portoviejo	0
Delfín	2
Gualaceo	0
Independiente del Valle	2

Semi-finals
Universidad Católica	2	2	4
LDU Quito	2	1	3
Delfín	0	0	0
Independiente del Valle	3	2	5

Final
Universidad Católica
Independiente del Valle

== Round of 32 ==
In the round of 32, the 16 Serie A teams entered the competition. In each tie, the team from the lower tier hosted the match. The draw for the round of 32 and subsequent rounds was held on 27 April 2026.

12 May 2026	Insutec	2–4	Barcelona	Quevedo
15:00 UTC−5	Lama 46'; Álvarez 76' (pen.)	Report	Céliz 12'; Martínez 47'; Wila 61'; Núñez 80'	Stadium: 7 de Octubre; Referee: Edison Silva

12 May 2026	Baños Ciudad de Fuego	0–2	Delfín	Baños
18:00 UTC−5		Report	Mendoza 51'; Molinas 78' (pen.)	Stadium: Coronel José Silva Romo; Referee: Santiago Guamanzara

14 May 2026	Astillero	2–1	Guayaquil City	Guayaquil
15:00 UTC−5	Alegría 17' (pen.); Solís 73'	Report	Palma 49' (pen.)	Stadium: Alejandro Ponce Noboa; Referee: Kléber Aroca

19 May 2026	LDU Portoviejo	1–1 (4–2 p)	Libertad	Portoviejo
18:00 UTC−5	Proaño 24'	Report	Cortez 34'	Stadium: Reales Tamarindos; Referee: Bryan Loayza
	Penalties
	Espínola (penalty scored); Gracia (penalty scored); Burgos (penalty scored); Proaño (penalty scored)		(penalty scored) Cortez; (penalty scored) Batalla; (penalty missed) Valencia; (penalty missed) Castro

20 May 2026	Daquilema	0–0 (10–9 p)	Emelec	Riobamba
15:30 UTC−5		Report		Stadium: Olímpico Fernando Guerrero; Referee: Patricio Parra
	Penalties
	Guachire (penalty scored); Arias (penalty scored); Sánchez (penalty scored); Cheme (penalty scored); Arana (penalty missed); Huilca (penalty scored); Castro (penalty scored); Perea (penalty scored); Mosquera (penalty scored); Mejía (penalty scored); Guachire (penalty scored)		(penalty scored) Leguizamón; (penalty scored) Nápoli; (penalty scored) Gonzaga; (penalty missed) Fragozo; (penalty scored) Quinteros; (penalty scored) Griffith; (penalty scored) Viteri; (penalty scored) Valencia; (penalty scored) Segura; (penalty scored) Ortiz; (penalty missed) Leguizamón

21 May 2026	San Antonio	0–3	Aucas	Ibarra
14:00 UTC−5		Report	Miranda 40'; Porozo 45+1'; Guzmán 90+2'	Stadium: Olímpico; Referee: Carlos Macías

22 May 2026	9 de Octubre	0–0 (3–5 p)	Manta	La Troncal
15:00 UTC−5		Report		Stadium: Municipal; Referee: Russell Terán
	Penalties
	Mejía (penalty scored); Riascos (penalty scored); Celedón (penalty missed); Chichande (penalty scored)		(penalty scored) Ramírez; (penalty scored) Medina; (penalty scored) Valencia; (penalty scored) Je. Nazareno; (penalty scored) Chávez

27 May 2026	Vinotinto Ecuador	2–1	Orense	Quito
15:30 UTC−5	Lugo 23', 63'	Report	Mena 45+4' (pen.)	Stadium: AFNA Arena; Referee: Eloy Beltrán

28 May 2026	El Nacional	1–4	Universidad Católica	Quito
18:00 UTC−5	Borja 41' (pen.)	Report	Palacios 37' (pen.); Martínez 67'; Moreno 70'; Mejía 90+3'	Stadium: Gonzalo Pozo Ripalda; Referee: Franklin Congo

29 May 2026	Juventud Italiana	2–0	Técnico Universitario	Manta
15:30 UTC−5	Villacrés 6'; Guerrero 56'	Report		Stadium: Jocay; Referee: Lenin Quiñónez

29 May 2026	Huaquillas	0–1	Leones	Huaquillas
18:30 UTC−5		Report	Mansilla 43' (pen.)	Stadium: Humberto Arteta Mayesa; Referee: Christian Guillén

2 June 2026	La Unión	0–0 (8–7 p)	Deportivo Cuenca	Pujilí
15:30 UTC−5		Report		Stadium: La Unión; Referee: Juan Carlos Andrade
	Penalties
	Guerra (penalty scored); Villamil (penalty scored); Cruz (penalty scored); Mazamba (penalty scored); Cagua (penalty missed); Vernaza (penalty scored); Almache (penalty scored); H. Espinoza (penalty scored); Lastra (penalty scored)		(penalty missed) Maccari; (penalty scored) Arboleda; (penalty scored) Piedra; (penalty scored) Erique; (penalty scored) Ferrero; (penalty scored) Mejía; (penalty scored) Díaz; (penalty scored) Chacón; (penalty missed) López

3 June 2026	Gualaceo	1–0	Mushuc Runa	Gualaceo
15:30 UTC−5	Silva 36'	Report		Stadium: Gerardo León Pozo; Referee: Oscar Zúñiga

4 June 2026	Cuenca Juniors	0–1	Macará	Cuenca
18:30 UTC−5		Report	Posse 48'	Stadium: Alejandro Serrano Aguilar; Referee: Anthony Díaz

8 July 2026	Deportivo Santo Domingo	0–2	Independiente del Valle	Santo Domingo
17:30 UTC−5		Report	Angulo 28'; Viacava 72'	Stadium: Etho Vega; Referee: Kevin Poveda

8 July 2026	Independiente Juniors	1–1 (3–4 p)	LDU Quito	Quito
20:00 UTC−5	Sciacqua 20'	Report	Cornejo 31'	Stadium: Banco Guayaquil; Referee: Kléber Aroca
	Penalties
	Ju. Cuero (penalty scored); Montaño (penalty scored); Viscarra (penalty scored); García (penalty missed); Ruiz (penalty missed)		(penalty missed) L. Quiñónez; (penalty scored) Medina; (penalty scored) Tobar; (penalty scored) Redes; (penalty scored) Segovia

== Round of 16 ==
29 July 2026	Gualaceo	1–1 (4–3 p)	Macará	Gualaceo
15:00 UTC−5	Coime 55'	Report	Posse 66'	Stadium: Gerardo Pozo León; Referee: Juan Carlos Andrade
	Penalties
	Salazar (penalty scored); Silva (penalty scored); Armijos (penalty scored); Angulo (penalty missed); Allauca (penalty scored)		(penalty scored) Posse; (penalty missed) Miranda; (penalty missed) Campana; (penalty scored) Klinger; (penalty scored) Jiménez

29 July 2026	Independiente del Valle	1–0	Manta	Quito
19:00 UTC−5	Loor 90+5'	Report		Stadium: Banco Guayaquil; Referee: Eloy Beltrán

30 July 2026	LDU Quito	6–0	Leones	Quito
15:00 UTC−5	Estrada 3', 18', 29'; Carabalí 25'; Corozo 26'; Deyverson 62'	Report		Stadium: Rodrigo Paz Delgado; Referee: Oswaldo Contreras

5 August 2026	Vinotinto Ecuador	2–3	Universidad Católica	Quito
15:00 UTC−5	Sánchez 19'; Vargas 59' (pen.)	Report	Fajardo 17', 90+5'; Lucero 29' (o.g.)	Stadium: AFNA Arena; Referee: Gorky Araujo

5 August 2026	LDU Portoviejo	3–0; Awarded	Barcelona	Portoviejo
19:00 UTC−5		Report	Quiñónez 65' (pen.)	Stadium: Reales Tamarindos; Referee: Bryan Loayza
Note: The match, which had originally been won by Barcelona 1–0, was awarded 3–0 to LDU Portoviejo due to Barcelona fielding the ineligible player Erick Mendoza.

12 August 2026	La Unión	1–1 (3–4 p)	Aucas	Pujilí
15:00 UTC−5	Lino 42'	Report	Mena 79'	Stadium: La Unión; Referee: Guillermo Guerrero
	Penalties
	Cruz (penalty scored); Mazamba (penalty scored); Cedeño (penalty scored); Lino (penalty missed); Lastra (penalty missed)		(penalty scored) Preciado; (penalty missed) Quiñónez; (penalty scored) Guzmán; (penalty scored) Zambrano; (penalty scored) Mena

13 August 2026	Astillero	2–0	Daquilema	Guayaquil
15:00 UTC−5	Valarezo 1'; Solís 80' (pen.)	Report		Stadium: Alejandro Ponce Noboa; Referee: Kevin Poveda

20 August 2026	Juventud Italiana	0–1	Delfín	Manta
15:00 UTC−5		Report	Bedoya 81'	Stadium: Jocay; Referee: Álex Cajas

== Quarter-finals ==
26 August 2026	LDU Quito	1–0	Aucas	Quito
17:00 UTC−5	Estrada 68' (pen.)	Report		Stadium: Rodrigo Paz Delgado; Referee: Yerson Zambrano

10 September 2026	Astillero	0–1	Universidad Católica	Guayaquil
15:00 UTC−5		Report	Fajardo 24'	Stadium: Alejandro Ponce Noboa; Referee: Gabriel González

16 September 2026	LDU Portoviejo	0–2	Delfín	Portoviejo
19:00 UTC−5		Report	Arce 47'; Ayunta 72' (pen.)	Stadium: Reales Tamarindos; Referee: Guillermo Guerrero

24 September 2026	Gualaceo	0–2	Independiente del Valle	Azogues
19:00 UTC−5		Report	Reasco 29'; Perelló 67'	Stadium: Jorge Andrade Cantos; Referee: Augusto Aragón

== Semi-finals ==
Team 1	Agg.	Team 2	1st leg	2nd leg
Universidad Católica	4–3	LDU Quito	2–2	2–1
Delfín	0–5	Independiente del Valle	0–3	0–2

=== First leg ===
28 October 2026	Delfín	0–3	Independiente del Valle	Manta
19:00 UTC−5		Report	Quintana 22', 46'; González 63'	Stadium: Jocay; Referee: Robert Cabrera

29 October 2026	Universidad Católica	2–2	LDU Quito	Quito
19:00 UTC−5	Fajardo 14'; Londoño 90+13' (pen.)	Report	Weigandt 77'; L. Rodríguez 90+5'	Stadium: Banco Guayaquil; Referee: Juan Carlos Andrade

=== Second leg ===
4 November 2026	LDU Quito	1–2 (3–4 agg.)	Universidad Católica	Quito
19:00 UTC−5	Estrada 66' (pen.)	Report	Fajardo 34'; Cangá 62'	Stadium: Rodrigo Paz Delgado; Referee: Gorky Araujo

5 November 2026	Independiente del Valle	2–0 (5–0 agg.)	Delfín	Quito
19:00 UTC−5	Reasco 66'; Sornoza 90+3'	Report		Stadium: Banco Guayaquil; Referee: Guillermo Guerrero

== Final ==
The final will be played at Estadio Alejandro Serrano Aguilar in Cuenca.

2 December 2026
--:-- UTC−5

Universidad Católica	v	Independiente del Valle

Estadio Alejandro Serrano Aguilar, Cuenca

== Top scorers ==
As of 5 November 2026

Rank	Player	Club	Goals
1	(Ecuador) Michael Estrada	LDU Quito	5
1	(Panama) José Fajardo	Universidad Católica	5
3	(Ecuador) Cristian Benalcázar	Deportivo Ibarra	2
3	(Ecuador) Fricson Borja	El Nacional	2
3	(Ecuador) José Lugo	Vinotinto Ecuador	2
3	(Ecuador) Felipe Mejía	9 de Octubre	2
3	(Uruguay) Franco Posse	Macará	2
3	(Paraguay) Hugo Quintana	Independiente del Valle	2
3	(Ecuador) Miguel Solís	Astillero	2

== See also ==
- 2026 LigaPro Serie A
