= Érick Plúas =

Ecuadorian footballer (born 2002)

Personal information
- Full name: Érick Alexander Plúas Vera
- Date of birth: 20 March 2002 (age 24)
- Place of birth: Huaquillas, Ecuador
- Height: 1.75 m (5 ft 9 in)
- Position: Midfielder

Team information
- Current team: Orense
- Number: 14

Youth career
- 2020: Orense
- 2021–2022: → Palmeiras (loan)

Senior career*
Years	Team	Apps	(Gls)
2021–	Orense	82	(1)

International career^{‡}
2019	Ecuador U17	12	(2)
2024	Ecuador U20	0	(0)
2024	Ecuador U23	4	(0)
- * Club domestic league appearances and goals as of 16 July 2026 ‡ National team caps and goals as of 16 July 2026

Érick Alexander Plúas Vera (born 20 March 2002) is an Ecuadorian professional footballer who plays as a midfielder for Orense S.C. in the LigaPro Serie A.

== Club career ==
Plúas joined the youth academy of Orense S.C. as a child and rose through the club's junior categories, winning several youth titles with the side. As a youth international, he was a regular starter for Ecuador's under-15 side at the 2017 South American Under-15 Championship in Argentina, and later played at the 2019 South American Under-17 Championship in Peru, through which Ecuador qualified for that year's 2019 FIFA U-17 World Cup in Brazil.

On 4 July 2020, Orense confirmed that Plúas, then 18, had been sent on a one-year loan with an option to buy to Brazilian club Palmeiras, where he had already been training for several months. Registered with Palmeiras' under-20 squad, he was among a group of youth players promoted to train alongside the first team under head coach Vanderlei Luxemburgo.

Plúas returned to Orense S.C. at the end of the loan and was promoted to the first-team squad in 2021, going on to become a regular member of the side in the LigaPro Serie A, primarily as a central or defensive midfielder.

== International career ==
Plúas represented Ecuador at under-17 level, featuring at the 2019 South American Under-17 Championship in Peru, and was named in the squad for the 2019 FIFA U-17 World Cup in Brazil, announced on 8 October 2019.

In December 2023, he was called up by coach Miguel Bravo to a training microcycle with the Ecuador under-23 squad as part of preparation for the 2024 Pre-Olympic Tournament in Venezuela, a qualifying competition for the 2024 Summer Olympics.

== Career statistics ==
As of match played 15 July 2026

Appearances and goals by club, season and competition
Club	Season	League			Cup		Continental		State League		Other		Total	
Club	Season	Division	Apps	Goals	Apps	Goals	Apps	Goals	Apps	Goals	Apps	Goals	Apps	Goals
Orense	2021	LigaPro Serie A	1	0	—		—		—		—		1	0
Orense	2022	LigaPro Serie A	26	0	—		—		—		—		26	0
Orense	2023	LigaPro Serie A	29	1	—		—		—		—		29	1
Orense	2024	LigaPro Serie A	17	0	—		—		—		—		17	0
Orense	2026	LigaPro Serie A	9	0	—		—		—		—		9	0
Career total			82	1	0	0	0	0	0	0	0	0	82	1
