= Ecuador national under-23 football team =

Ecuador Olympic
- Nickname(s): La Tri (The Tri); La Tricolor (The Tricolors); Los Amarillos (The Yellows)
- Association: Federación Ecuatoriana de Fútbol (FEF)
- Confederation: CONMEBOL (South America)
- Head coach: Jorge Célico
- FIFA code: ECU

Pan American Games
- Appearances: 3 (first in 1995)
- Best result: 7th (2011)

The Ecuador national under-23 football team (also known as the Ecuador Olympic football team) represents Ecuador in international football competitions during Olympic Games and Pan American Games. The selection is limited to players under the age of 23, except for three overage players. The team is controlled by the Ecuadorian Football Federation.

== Competitive record ==
=== Olympic Games ===
Olympic Games record
Year	Host	Round	Pos.	GP	W	D	L	GS	GA
1992	(Spain) Barcelona	Did not qualify							
1996	(United States) Atlanta	Did not qualify							
2000	(Australia) Sydney	Did not qualify							
2004	(Greece) Athens	Did not qualify							
2008	(China) Beijing	Did not qualify							
2012	(United Kingdom) London	Did not qualify							
2016	(Brazil) Rio de Janeiro	Did not qualify							
2020	(Japan) Tokyo	Did not qualify							
2024	(France) Paris	Did not qualify							
Total		–	0/9	–	–	–	–	–	–

=== CONMEBOL Preolímpico ===
CONMEBOL Preolímpico record
Year	Host	Pos.	GP	W	D	L	GS	GA
1992	Paraguay	Fourth place	7	3	1	3	12	6
1996	Argentina	Group stage	4	0	1	3	5	18
2000	Brazil	Group stage	4	0	0	4	5	12
2004	Chile	Group stage	4	3	0	1	10	9
2020	Colombia	Group stage	4	0	0	4	0	9
2024	Venezuela	Group stage	4	2	1	1	7	3
Total		Fourth place	27	8	3	16	39	57

=== Pan American Games ===
Pan American Games record
Year	Host	Round	Pos.	GP	W	D	L	GS	GA
1995	(Argentina) Mar del Plata	Group stage	9th	3	1	0	2	6	10
1999	(Canada) Winnipeg	Did not qualify							
2003	(Dominican Republic) Santo Domingo	Did not qualify							
2007	(Brazil) Rio de Janeiro	The Under-17 team participated							
2011	(Mexico) Guadalajara	Group stage	7th	3	0	1	2	2	4
2015	(Canada) Toronto	Did not qualify							
2019	(Peru) Lima	Group stage	8th	3	0	1	2	3	6
2023	(Chile) Santiago	Did not qualify							
Total		7th	3/19	9	1	2	6	11	20

== Results and fixtures ==
Win Draw Loss Fixture

== Players ==
=== Current squad ===
Head coach: (Ecuador) Miguel Bravo

Ecuador announced their 23-man squad on 28 December 2023. On 3 January 2024, Ecuadorian Football Federation announced that Sebastián González, Óscar Zambrano, Daykol Romero (all three from LDU Quito) and Jhoanner Chávez (Bahia) were dropped from the squad because their clubs decided not to release them and were replaced by Ronny Borja, Andrew Draper, Ronald Perlaza and Carlos Sánchez.

Forward Nilson Angulo was initially considered but was not part of the team as his club (Anderlecht) decided not to release him.

No.	Pos.	Player	Date of birth (age)	Club
1	GK	Cristhian Loor	9 March 2006 (aged 17)	(Ecuadorian Football Federation) Independiente del Valle
2	DF	Óscar Quiñónez	19 February 2001 (aged 22)	(Ecuadorian Football Federation) Orense
3	DF	Christian García	6 July 2004 (aged 19)	(Ecuadorian Football Federation) Independiente del Valle
4	DF	Alex Rangel	18 March 2002 (aged 21)	(Ecuadorian Football Federation) Técnico Universitario
5	MF	Érick Plúas	20 March 2002 (aged 21)	(Ecuadorian Football Federation) Orense
6	DF	Layan Loor	23 May 2001 (aged 22)	(Ecuadorian Football Federation) Universidad Católica
7	FW	Yaimar Medina	5 November 2004 (aged 19)	(Ecuadorian Football Federation) Independiente del Valle
8	MF	Patrik Mercado	31 July 2003 (aged 20)	(Ecuadorian Football Federation) Independiente del Valle
9	FW	Justin Cuero	18 March 2004 (aged 19)	(Russian Football Union) Orenburg
10	MF	Pedro Vite (captain)	9 March 2002 (aged 21)	(Canadian Soccer Association) Vancouver Whitecaps
11	FW	John Mercado	3 June 2002 (aged 21)	(Portuguese Football Federation) AVS
12	GK	Gilmar Napa	5 January 2003 (aged 21)	(Ecuadorian Football Federation) Emelec
13	DF	Joshué Quiñónez	29 May 2001 (aged 22)	(Ecuadorian Football Federation) Barcelona
14	DF	Carlos Sánchez	6 February 2001 (aged 22)	(Ecuadorian Football Federation) Independiente del Valle
15	MF	Ronny Borja	10 June 2005 (aged 18)	(Ecuadorian Football Federation) El Nacional
16	FW	Allen Obando	13 June 2006 (aged 17)	(Ecuadorian Football Federation) Barcelona
17	FW	Junior Ayoví	21 December 2001 (aged 22)	(Ecuadorian Football Federation) Guayaquil City
18	MF	Youri Ochoa	10 January 2005 (aged 19)	(Ecuadorian Football Federation) Independiente del Valle
19	FW	Cristhoper Zambrano	5 July 2004 (aged 19)	(Ecuadorian Football Federation) Aucas
20	MF	Andrew Draper	4 August 2001 (aged 22)	(United States Soccer Federation) Sporting Kansas City
21	MF	Ronald Perlaza	11 May 2005 (aged 18)	(Ecuadorian Football Federation) Aucas
22	GK	Alexis Villa	22 September 2001 (aged 22)	(Ecuadorian Football Federation) Independiente del Valle
23	DF	Maikel Reyes	13 January 2003 (aged 21)	(Ecuadorian Football Federation) Delfín
