= Óscar Quiñónez =

Ecuadorian footballer (born 2001)

Personal information
- Full name: Óscar Esteban Quiñónez Mendoza
- Date of birth: February 19, 2001 (age 25)
- Place of birth: Machala, Ecuador
- Height: 1.90 m (6 ft 3 in)
- Position: Centre-back

Team information
- Current team: Orense (on loan from Racing Club de Montevideo)
- Number: 45

Youth career
- 2020: Orense

Senior career*
Years	Team	Apps	(Gls)
2021–2024	Orense	78	(2)
2024	Racing Club de Montevideo	4	(0)
2024	→ Orense (loan)	15	(0)
2025	→ Independiente del Valle (loan)	11	(0)
2026–	→ Orense (loan)	15	(1)

International career^{‡}
2024	Ecuador U23	4	(0)
- * Club domestic league appearances and goals as of 16 July 2026 ‡ National team caps and goals as of 16 July 2026

Óscar Esteban Quiñónez Mendoza (born 19 February 2001) is an Ecuadorian professional footballer who plays as a centre-back for Orense, on loan from Racing Club de Montevideo of the Uruguayan Primera División.

== Club career ==
Born in Machala, Quiñónez joined the youth ranks of Orense at the age of 14.

He made his first-team and Ecuadorian Serie A debut for Orense on 1 August 2021, under coach Andrés García Soler, coming on as a substitute for Julio Angulo in a 2–2 draw against Delfín. He scored his first professional goal on 28 November of the same year, in a 2–0 away win over Olmedo.

Quiñónez left Orense on 18 January 2024 to sign for Racing Club de Montevideo of the Uruguayan Primera División. He returned to Orense later the same year, and was regarded as one of the club's standout players during the 2024 season.

On 6 January 2025, Quiñónez signed for Independiente del Valle under coach Javier Rabanal. He later moved to Racing Club de Montevideo for a second spell, before joining Orense on loan on 22 January 2026.

== International career ==
On 27 December 2023, Quiñónez was named by coach Miguel Bravo in Ecuador's squad for the under-23 Pre-Olympic Tournament, held in Venezuela.

== Personal life ==
Quiñónez is the twin brother of fellow footballer Steeven Quiñónez, and is also the brother of footballer Bryan Quiñónez both play for Orense.

== Career statistics ==
As of match played 10 July 2026

Appearances and goals by club, season and competition
Club	Season	League			Cup		Continental		State League		Other		Total	
Club	Season	Division	Apps	Goals	Apps	Goals	Apps	Goals	Apps	Goals	Apps	Goals	Apps	Goals
Orense	2021	LigaPro Serie A	13	1	—		—		—		—		13	1
Orense	2022	LigaPro Serie A	25	0	—		—		—		—		25	0
Orense	2023	LigaPro Serie A	25	1	—		—		—		—		25	1
Orense (loan)	2024	LigaPro Serie A	15	0	—		—		—		—		15	0
Orense (loan)	Total		78	2	—		—		—		—		78	2
Racing Montevideo	2024	Liga AUF	4	0	—		1 (Note: Appearance in Copa Sudamericana)	0	—		—		5	0
Independiente del Valle	2025	LigaPro Serie A	9	0	—		2 (Note: Appearance in Copa Libertadores)	0	—		—		13	0
Orense (loan)	2026	LigaPro Serie A	14	1	0	0	1	0	0	0	0	0	15	1
Career total			105	3	0	0	4	0	0	0	0	0	109	3
