= Ronny Borja =

Ecuadorian footballer (born 2005)

Personal information
- Full name: Ronny Matías Borja Robalino
- Date of birth: June 10, 2005 (age 21)
- Place of birth: Quito, Ecuador
- Height: 1.66 m (5 ft 5 1/2 in)
- Position: Defensive midfielder

Team information
- Current team: Leones Fútbol Club
- Number: 55

Youth career
- 2023: El Nacional

Senior career*
Years	Team	Apps	(Gls)
2023	El Nacional	11	(1)
2024–2026	Emelec	24	(1)
2026–	Leones	14	(0)

International career^{‡}
2025	Ecuador U20	3	(0)
2024	Ecuador U23	3	(0)
- * Club domestic league appearances and goals as of 10 July 2026 ‡ National team caps and goals as of 1 February 2025

Ronny Matías Borja Robalino (born 10 June 2005) is an Ecuadorian professional footballer who plays as a midfielder for Leones Fútbol Club.

== Club career ==
Born in Quito, Borja came through the youth categories of El Nacional. He made his senior debut for the club during the 2023 season, in which he made 12 appearances and scored one goal.

Having become a free agent after leaving El Nacional, Borja signed for Emelec on 16 February 2024, with the Guayaquil-based club acquiring 100 per cent of his training and economic rights. He made his Ecuadorian Serie A debut on 4 August 2024, starting in a 1–0 home defeat to Deportivo Cuenca; he was replaced late in the match by academy graduate Elkin Muñoz, who was himself making his professional debut in the same game.

Borja's spell at Emelec was disrupted by injury. In April 2025 he ruptured the anterior cruciate ligament and medial meniscus in his left knee during a 1–1 draw with Manta FC, an injury that required surgery. He returned before the end of the year but suffered a partial tear of a collateral ligament in training in November 2025, ending his season early.

Borja left Emelec as a free agent at the end of his contract and, on 30 January 2026, joined newly promoted Leones Fútbol Club ahead of the club's first-ever season in the Ecuadorian Serie A.

== International career ==
In January 2024, while still registered with El Nacional, Borja was called up by coach Miguel Bravo to Ecuador's under-23 squad for that year's South American Pre-Olympic Tournament in Venezuela, a competition that doubled as qualification for the football tournament at the 2024 Summer Olympics in Paris. Ecuador were eliminated in the group phase.

In January 2025, by then an established member of Emelec's first-team squad, Borja was named in Ecuador's under-20 squad for the 2025 South American U-20 Championship, a qualifying tournament for the 2025 FIFA U-20 World Cup in Chile.

== Career statistics ==
As of match played 10 July 2026

Appearances and goals by club, season and competition
Club	Season	League			Cup		Continental		State League		Other		Total	
Club	Season	Division	Apps	Goals	Apps	Goals	Apps	Goals	Apps	Goals	Apps	Goals	Apps	Goals
El Nacional	2023	LigaPro Serie A	11	1	—		—		—		—		11	1
Emelec	2024	LigaPro Serie A	16	0	—		—		—		—		16	0
Emelec	2025	LigaPro Serie A	7	0	1	0	—		—		—		8	0
Emelec	Total		23	1	1	0	—		—		—		24	1
Leones	2026	LigaPro Serie A	14	0	0	0	0	0	0	0	0	0	14	0
Career total			48	1	0	0	0	0	0	0	0	0	49	1
