= Agustín Robles =

Argentine football manager

Personal information
- Date of birth: 7 January 1989 (age 37)
- Place of birth: Argentina

Managerial career
- Years: Team
- Banfield (youth)
- 2023: Lanús (youth)
- 2024–2026: Orense (youth)
- 2026: Orense (interim)
- 2026: Orense (interim)
- 2026: Orense

Agustín Robles (born 7 January 1989) is an Argentine football manager.

== Career ==
Robles worked in the youth categories of Banfield and Lanús before moving abroad in 2024, taking over the under-19 team of Orense in Ecuador.

On 6 March 2026, Robles was named interim manager of Orense, after compatriot Raúl Antuña left. Back to his previous role after the arrival of Hernán Torres, he was again interim on 20 July, after Torres' departure, before being confirmed as manager until the end of the year late in that month.

On 24 September 2026, Robles was dismissed by Orense.
