= Jonathan Montenegro (footballer) =

Ecuadorian footballer (born 1990)

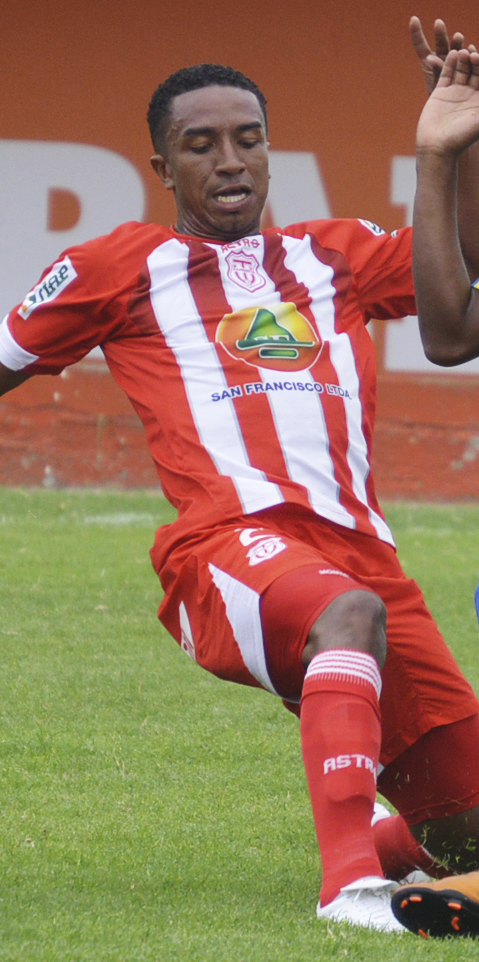
- Montenegro in 2014

Personal information
- Full name: Jonathan Javier Montenegro Castillo
- Date of birth: 13 May 1990 (age 36)
- Place of birth: Guayaquil, Ecuador
- Position: Defender

Team information
- Current team: Olmedo

Youth career
- LDU Guayaquil
- 2008–2009: River Plate Ecuador

Senior career*
Years	Team	Apps	(Gls)
2008–2010	River Plate Ecuador	51	
2010–2011	Barcelona	7	(0)
2011–2014	River Plate Ecuador		
2012	→ Macará (loan)	15	(0)
2014–2015	Técnico Universitario		
2015–2016	Gualaceo SC		
2016–2017	Liga de Loja		
2017–	Olmedo		
- * Club domestic league appearances and goals

Jonathan Javier Montenegro Castillo (born 13 May 1990 in Guayaquil) is an Ecuadorian football defender who played for Olmedo in 2017.
