= Alex Rangel =

Ecuadorian footballer (born 2002)

Álex Rangel
Personal information
- Full name: Álex Daniel Rangel Corozo
- Date of birth: March 18, 2002 (age 24)
- Place of birth: Guayaquil, Ecuador
- Height: 1.87 m (6 ft 1 1/2 in)
- Position: Centre-back

Team information
- Current team: Barcelona SC
- Number: 14

Senior career*
Years	Team	Apps	(Gls)
2020–2023	Técnico Universitario	46	(1)
2024–	Barcelona SC	46	(1)

International career^{‡}
2023	Ecuador U23	1	(0)
- * Club domestic league appearances and goals as of 16 July 2026 ‡ National team caps and goals as of 25 August 2023

Alex Daniel Rangel Corozo (born 18 March 2002) is an Ecuadorian professional footballer who plays as a centre-back for Barcelona SC.

== Club career ==
Born in Guayaquil, Rangel grew up playing football with his brothers and father before a neighbourhood friend encouraged him to attend his first semi-professional training session at the age of 16. He joined Técnico Universitario's first-team squad in 2020, and went on to establish himself as a regular starter, helping the club avoid relegation from the Serie A in 2022.

Rangel had a breakout 2023 season, making 30 league appearances and scoring one goal, and was regarded as one of the best defenders in that year's LigaPro campaign.

On 4 January 2024, Rangel signed a five-year contract with Barcelona SC as a free agent. The move became the subject of a lengthy dispute: Técnico Universitario contended that Rangel remained under a valid professional contract with the club until 2025, rather than the amateur agreement cited to justify his free transfer, and filed a claim with the Ecuadorian Football Federation's Chamber of Mediation and Dispute Resolution. In June 2025, the Chamber ruled that Rangel's contract had indeed been amateur, dismissing Técnico Universitario's US$500,000 transfer-fee claim, but ordered Barcelona SC to pay the club US$27,616.44 in training compensation for developing the player.

Rangel missed several months of the 2025 season because of a knee injury sustained in late April 2025.

== International career ==
In August 2023, Rangel was called up to the Ecuador national team by manager Félix Sánchez Bas for 2026 FIFA World Cup qualifiers against Argentina and Uruguay.

He was later named in Ecuador's under-23 squad for the 2024 CONMEBOL Pre-Olympic Tournament in Venezuela, which served as qualification for the 2024 Summer Olympics in Paris.

== Career statistics ==
As of match played 15 July 2026

Appearances and goals by club, season and competition
Club	Season	League			Cup		Continental		State League		Other		Total	
Club	Season	Division	Apps	Goals	Apps	Goals	Apps	Goals	Apps	Goals	Apps	Goals	Apps	Goals
Técnico Universitario	2021	LigaPro Serie A	7	0	—		—		—		—		7	0
Técnico Universitario	2022	LigaPro Serie A	17	0	—		—		—		—		17	0
Técnico Universitario	2023	LigaPro Serie A	22	1	—		—		—		—		22	1
Técnico Universitario	Total		46	1	—		—		—		—		46	1
Barcelona SC	2024	LigaPro Serie A	23	1	—		4 (Note: One Appearance in Copa Sudamericana and Three appearances in Copa Libertadores)	0	—		—		27	1
Barcelona SC	2025	LigaPro Serie A	10	0	1	0	4 (Note: Appearance(s) in Copa Libertadores)	0	—		—		15	0
Barcelona SC	2026	LigaPro Serie A	13	0	—		8 (Note: Appearance(s) in Copa Libertadores)	0	—		—		21	0
Barcelona SC	Total		46	1	1	0	16	0	—		—		63	1
Career total			92	2	1	0	16	0	0	0	0	0	109	2
