= Juan Anangonó =

Juan Anangonó may refer to:

- Juan Carlos Anangonó (born 1989), Ecuadorian footballer
- Juan Luis Anangonó (born 1989), Ecuadorian international footballer
