= Ángel Gómez (footballer, born 1976) =

Spanish football director (born 1976)

Ángel Gómez Ruiz (born 15 September 1976) is a Spanish director of football. He has worked in other football roles such as a scout, and manager of C.D. River Ecuador in 2017.

== Early life and playing career ==
Gómez was born in Seville in Andalusia to a local mother and a father from Galicia. At the age of three months, he moved to Frankfurt in West Germany. He played in the youth ranks of Eintracht Frankfurt before returning to Spain at age 12. He settled in Catalonia and played on the left wing for several lower-league clubs in the region including UE Cornellà, FC Santboià, AEC Manlleu and CF Balaguer.

== Coaching and directorial career ==
A psychology graduate and UEFA Pro Licence holder, Gómez began coaching the youth team at CE Europa in Barcelona, and at 26 he was the coordinator of the entire youth set-up. By the time of his exit in 2009, all of Europa's youth teams were playing at the highest regional level.

Gómez then moved to Ecuador, where he became the director of Barcelona S.C. in Guayaquil. During his time in charge, the team managed by compatriot Benito Floro went from avoiding relegation on the final matchday to qualifying for the Copa Sudamericana, having been in the higher Copa Libertadores places for most of the season. In 2011 he moved to Independiente del Valle where he was also manager of the under-18 team and won the national title.

Due to his wife's pregnancy, Gómez returned to Spain and became a scout on the South American market for RCD Espanyol. In 2012, Óscar Perarnau promoted him to technical secretary, and he succeeded him as director of football in 2016. He was dismissed on 28 November, having signed 11 players including David López, and was succeeded by academy coordinator Jordi Lardín. Gómez later said that he had wanted Paco Jémez as manager, and eventual appointee Quique Sánchez Flores demanded players that Gómez did not want to sign, such as Álvaro Vázquez and José Manuel Jurado.

In December 2016, Gómez agreed to return to Ecuador in the new year as manager of C.D. River Ecuador in the Ecuadorian Serie A. He was sacked on 28 March with the team last in the table, with four draws and as many losses.

Gómez returned to European football in June 2018, being appointed director at AC Omonia in the Cypriot First Division. He appointed Juan Carlos Oliva, a strategist at Espanyol, to be the manager.
