= Javier Carvajal =

Ecuadorian footballer and manager (born 1972)

Personal information
- Full name: Javier Eduardo Carvajal Burgos
- Date of birth: 1 June 1989 (age 37)
- Place of birth: Jipijapa, Ecuador
- Position: Goalkeeper

Youth career
- 2003–2009: Manta

Senior career*
Years	Team	Apps	(Gls)
2006–2010	Manta	12	(0)
2009	→ Águilas Santo Domingo (loan)	9	(0)
2010	→ Jipijapa (loan)	0	(0)
2011	Águilas Santo Domingo	16	(0)
2011	Grecia	5	(0)
2012	Delfín	12	(0)
2013	Fuerza Amarilla	8	(0)
Total		62	(0)

Managerial career
- 2020–2024: Delfín (assistant)
- 2020: Delfín (interim)
- 2024: La Paz
- 2024: Delfín
- 2025: Manta (assistant)
- 2025–2026: Manta
- * Club domestic league appearances and goals

Javier Eduardo Carvajal Burgos (born 1 June 1989) is an Ecuadorian football manager and former player who played as a goalkeeper.

== Playing career ==
Born in Jipijapa, Manabí, Carvajal was a youth product of Manta, and made his senior debut with the club in 2006 at the age of 17. After failing to establish himself as a regular starter, he served loans at Águilas Santo Domingo and Jipijapa.

In 2011, after another spell at Águilas, Carvajal joined Grecia in the Ecuadorian Serie B. He moved to Delfín in the following year, before representing Fuerza Amarilla in the 2013 season, both in the Segunda Categoría.

== Managerial career ==
After retiring, Carvajal became an assistant at former side Delfín, being also an interim in September 2020 for one match between the spells of Carlos Ischia and Miguel Ángel Zahzú. He subsequently returned to his previous role, before becoming a manager of affiliate club La Paz for the 2024 season.

On 16 September 2024, Carvajal was named interim manager of Delfín until the end of the year, replacing sacked Juan Pablo Buch. On 2 January of the following year, he was sacked.

Carvajal returned to his first club Manta shortly after, initially as an assistant of Efrén Mera, before being appointed manager of the side on 2 September 2025. The following 30 July, he was sacked after being eliminated from the Copa Ecuador.
