= Matías Córdoba =

Matías Córdoba may refer to:

- Matías Córdoba (footballer, born 1984), Argentine midfielder
- Matías Córdoba (footballer, born 1999), Argentine midfielder or forward
