= Erick Zambrano =

Ecuadorian footballer (born 2007)

Personal information
- Full name: Erick Smith Zambrano Pesantez
- Date of birth: 14 November 2007 (age 18)
- Place of birth: Machala, El Oro, Ecuador
- Height: 1.72 m (5 ft 8 in)
- Position: Forward

Team information
- Current team: Orense
- Number: 54

Youth career
- 2017: Orense
- 2018: Independiente del Valle
- 2019–2023: Orense

Senior career*
Years	Team	Apps	(Gls)
2023–	Orense	3	(0)

International career^{‡}
2023	Ecuador U17	2	(0)
- * Club domestic league appearances and goals as of 15:00, 13 November 2023 (UTC) ‡ National team caps and goals as of 11 June 2025 (UTC)

Erick Smith Zambrano Pesantez (born 14 November 2007) is an Ecuadorian footballer who plays as a forward for Ecuadorian Serie A club Orense.

== Club career ==
Born in Machala in the El Oro Province of Ecuador, Zambrano joined the academy of local side Orense in 2017 at the age of nine. He had a brief spell with Independiente del Valle in the 2018 season, before returning to Orense, where he was promoted to the club's first team at the age of fifteen in July 2023.

He made his professional debut on 17 August 2023, coming on as a late second-half substitute for Dany Coronel in a 2–0 win against Gualaceo. In doing so, he broke Kendry Páez' record as youngest player to feature in the Ecuadorian Serie A at 15 years and 275 days old.

== Style of play ==
While in the academy of Independiente del Valle, he was given the nickname "Cavani" by then-youth-coach Miguel Ángel Ramírez, due to his similar hairstyle and style of play as Uruguayan international footballer Edinson Cavani.

== Career statistics ==
=== Club ===
As of 13 November 2023.

Appearances and goals by club, season and competition
Club	Season	League			Cup		Continental		Other		Total	
Club	Season	Division	Apps	Goals	Apps	Goals	Apps	Goals	Apps	Goals	Apps	Goals
Orense	2023	Ecuadorian Serie A	3	0	0	0	–		0	0	3	0
Career total			3	0	0	0	0	0	0	0	3	0
