= Pool Gavilánez =

Ecuadorian footballer and manager (born 1981)

Personal information
- Full name: Pool Geovanny Gavilánez Solís
- Date of birth: 3 August 1981 (age 45)
- Place of birth: Guayaquil, Ecuador
- Height: 1.76 m (5 ft 9 in)
- Position: Midfielder

Team information
- Current team: Guayaquil City (manager)

Youth career
- 1999–2000: Emelec

Senior career*
Years	Team	Apps	(Gls)
2000–2005	Emelec	0	(0)
2000–2001	→ Santa Rita (loan)	19	(0)
2002	→ Delfín (loan)	21	(1)
2003	→ Peñarol Portoviejo (loan)	2	(0)
2004	→ Audaz Octubrino (loan)	25	(3)
2005	Deportivo Quevedo	25	(3)
2006	Toreros	6	(0)
2007–2009	Patria	20	(4)
2010	Calvi	8	(0)
2011	Carlos Borbor Reyes	6	(2)

International career
2001	Ecuador U20		

Managerial career
- Guayaquil Sport
- 2017–: Guayaquil City
- * Club domestic league appearances and goals

Pool Geovanny Gavilánez Solís (born 3 August 1981) is an Ecuadorian football manager and former player who played as a midfielder. He is the current manager of Guayaquil City.

== Playing career ==
Born in Guayaquil, Gavilánez spent the most of his career linked to Emelec. However, he never made his first team debut with the side, serving loan deals at Santa Rita, Delfín, Peñarol Portoviejo and Audaz Octubrino before leaving in 2005.

Gavilánez subsequently represented Deportivo Quevedo, Toreros, Patria, Calvi and Carlos Borbor Reyes, retiring with the latter in the end of 2011, aged 32.

== Managerial career ==
After retiring, Gavilánez started managing Guayaquil Sport. For the 2017 season, he became the sporting director of River Ecuador before being named manager of the club (now named Guayaquil City) in September.

On 6 November 2017, Gavilánez renewed his contract with Guayaquil City for the 2018 campaign. On 6 December 2022, he further extended his link until 2027.

Despite suffering relegation in the 2023 season, Gavilánez remained in charge of the club for the following year, and led the club back to the top tier in the 2025 campaign.

== Honours ==
Guayaquil City

- Ecuadorian Serie B: 2025
