= Maxi Bevacqua =

Argentine footballer (born 1980)

Personal information
- Full name: Julio Maximiliano Bevacqua
- Date of birth: 9 June 1980 (age 46)
- Place of birth: Córdoba, Argentina
- Height: 1.81 m (5 ft 11 in)
- Position: Striker

Team information
- Current team: Aucas (youth coordinator)

Youth career
- San Lorenzo

Senior career*
Years	Team	Apps	(Gls)
1999–2006	San Lorenzo	20	(2)
2000–2001	→ Almagro (loan)	29	(12)
2002–2003	→ Chacarita Juniors (loan)	7	(0)
2003–2004	→ C.A.I. (loan)	36	(17)
2004–2005	→ Belgrano (loan)	35	(15)
2005	→ Braga (loan)	13	(2)
2006	→ Estrela Amadora (loan)	14	(0)
2006	→ Villa Mitre (loan)	9	(1)
2007	Portimonense	14	(0)
2008	FC Vaduz	25	(3)
2008–2009	Panthrakikos	9	(0)
2009	Atlético Rafaela	13	(0)
2010	Manta	44	(22)
2011–2012	Deportivo Quito	74	(28)
2013–2014	Atlético Venezuela	23	(6)
2014–2015	Independiente Neuquén	8	(1)
2015	Delfín	13	(2)

Managerial career
- 2025: Atlético Vinotinto (assistant)
- 2025: Atlético Vinotinto
- * Club domestic league appearances and goals

Julio Maximiliano "Maxi" Bevacqua (born 9 June 1980, in Córdoba) is an Argentine football coach and former player who played as a striker. He is the current youth coordinator of Ecuadorian club Aucas.
