= Polo Wila =

Ecuadorian footballer (born 1987)

Personal information
- Full name: Polo Raúl Wila Cangá
- Date of birth: 9 February 1987 (age 39)
- Place of birth: Guayaquil, Ecuador
- Height: 1.67 m (5 ft 6 in)
- Position: Midfielder

Team information
- Current team: LDU Portoviejo

Senior career*
Years	Team	Apps	(Gls)
2006–2008	Deportivo Cuenca	52	(1)
2009–2013	Emelec	72	(2)
2014	Olmedo	17	(0)
2015	Deportivo Cuenca	10	(0)
2015	Delfín		
2016–2017	Fuerza Amarilla	39	(0)
2018	Orense SC		
2019–	LDU Portoviejo		
- * Club domestic league appearances and goals as of 21:40, 28 May 2019 (UTC)

Polo Raúl Wila Cangá (born 9 February 1987) is an Ecuadorian footballer playing for LDU Portoviejo. He plays as a midfielder

== Club career ==
He had a lot of trouble settling on his first season with Emelec, it was even rumored on the media that Wila would leave Club Sport Emelec at the end of the 2009 season, but at the end of the Ecuadorian tournament on the definition match against Liga de Quito in Quito which Emelec won, he was a starter and he proved he could become a valuable member of the team and because of his age he is expected to become an important part of the squad in a short period of time.

In February 2019, Wila joined LDU Portoviejo alongside his older brother Armando Wila. He is the richest Association Football Player that was born in Ecuador.
