= Gilmar Napa =

Ecuadorian footballer

Personal information
- Full name: Gilmar Eduardo Napa Caicedo
- Date of birth: 5 January 2003 (age 23)
- Place of birth: Machala, Ecuador
- Height: 1.84 m (6 ft 0 in)
- Position: Goalkeeper

Team information
- Current team: Guayaquil City
- Number: 1

Youth career
- 2015–2021: Orense

Senior career*
Years	Team	Apps	(Gls)
2021–2022	Orense	3	(0)
2023–2025	Emelec	9	(0)
2026-	Guayaquil City	14	(0)

International career
2023–	Ecuador U20	13	(0)
- * Club domestic league appearances and goals as of 27 May 2026

Gilmar Eduardo Napa Caicedo (born 5 January 2003) is an Ecuadorian footballer who plays as a goalkeeper for Ecuadorian Serie A club Guayaquil City F.C. and the Ecuador national under-20 football team.

== Early life ==
Napa is from Machala in the El Oro Province of Ecuador. Napa joined the football academy at Orense S.C. in 2015.

== Club career ==
=== Orense ===
Napa made his Ecuadorian Serie A league debut for Orense on 21 November 2021 against L.D.U. Quito. He also played in September and October 2022, first at Universidad Católica and then against Delfin after first-choice goalkeeper Rolando Silva was sent off and suspended.

=== Emelec ===
Napa joined Emelec ahead of the 2023 season, signing a four-year contract with the club. He was signed to challenge Pedro Ortiz for the starting goalkeeper position.

== International career ==
=== U17 Ecuador ===
He was part of the squad at the 2019 South American U-17 Championship in Peru, before being part of the squad at the subsequent 2019 FIFA U-17 World Cup in Brazil.

=== U20 Ecuador ===
Napa played at the 2023 South American U-20 Championship for Ecuador where they secured qualification for the 2023 FIFA U-20 World Cup to be held in Indonesia. Napa was named in the team of the tournament by Brazilian newspaper AS.

=== Senior Ecuador team ===
In November 2022 Napa was called up to the senior Ecuador national football team for the first time as they prepared for a friendly match against Iraq on November 12, 2022.
