= Andrés Mena =

Ecuadorian footballer

Personal information
- Full name: Andrés David Mena Montenegro
- Date of birth: 7 September 2000 (age 26)
- Place of birth: Quito, Ecuador
- Height: 1.86 m (6 ft 1 in)
- Position: Midfielder

Team information
- Current team: Aucas

Youth career
- Independiente del Valle

Senior career*
Years	Team	Apps	(Gls)
2018–2020	Independiente del Valle	4	(0)
2019–2020	Independiente Juniors	19	(1)
2021–2023	Rangers	0	(0)
2021	→ Atlético Santo Domingo (loan)	10	(2)
2022	→ El Nacional (loan)	26	(1)
2023	→ 9 de Octubre (loan)	9	(0)
2024-2025	El Nacional	6	(0)
2026–	Aucas	6	(0)
- * Club domestic league appearances and goals as of 24 August 2025

Andrés David Mena Montenegro (born 7 September 2000) is an Ecuadorian footballer who plays as a midfielder for Aucas in the LigaPro.

== Career ==
A product of Independiente del Valle, Mena made his professional debut with them on 1 November 2018 in the top division, and also played for the reserve team, Independiente Juniors, in the second level. He was a member of the squads that won both the 2019 Copa Sudamericana and the 2020 U-20 Copa Libertadores.

In 2021, Mena moved to Chile and signed with Rangers de Talca. In the second half of the same year, he returned to Ecuador, on loan to Atlético Santo Domingo.

In 2022, Mena switched to El Nacional, with whom he won the Ecuadorian Serie B. The next year, he went on to 9 de Octubre.

In January 2024, Mena rejoined El Nacional in the Ecuadorian top division. He made an appearance at the 2024 Copa Libertadores in the 0–1 loss against Sportivo Trinidense on 29 February.
