= Francisco Gómez (footballer) =

Ecuadorian footballer (born 1977)

Personal information
- Full name: Francisco Gómez Portocarrero
- Date of birth: September 24, 1977 (age 49)
- Place of birth: Ecuador
- Position: Defender

Senior career*
Years	Team	Apps	(Gls)
1995	CD Audaz Octubrino		
1996	LDU Cuenca		
1997	Deportivo Toluca FC		
1997–1998	CD Veracruz		
1999–2000	Ángeles de Puebla		
2000–2001	CD Irapuato		
2002	Alebrijes de Oaxaca		
2003	CD Veracruz		
2006	CD Esmeraldas Petrolero		
2007	LDU Portoviejo		
2007–2008	CS Emelec	29	(1)
2008	SD Aucas	13	(1)
2009	Manta FC	34	(1)
2010	CD Técnico Universitario	23	(1)
2011	CD ESPOLI	14	(3)
- * Club domestic league appearances and goals

Francisco Gómez Portocarrero (born 24 September 1977) is an Ecuadorian former footballer.

== Early life ==
He was born in 1977 in Valdez, Ecuador. He moved to Guayaquil, Ecuador at a young age.

== Career ==
He started his career with Ecuadorian side CD Audaz Octubrino. In 1996, he signed for Ecuadorian side LDU Cuenca. In 1997, he signed for Mexican side Deportivo Toluca FC. After that, he signed for Mexican side CD Veracruz. In 1999, he signed for Mexican side Ángeles de Puebla. In 2000, he signed for Mexican side CD Irapuato. In 2002, he signed for Mexican side Alebrijes de Oaxaca. In 2003, he signed for Mexican side CD Veracruz. In 2006, he signed for Ecuadorian side CD Esmeraldas Petrolero. In 2007, he signed for Ecuadorian side LDU Portoviejo. After that, he signed for Ecuadorian side CS Emelec. In 2008, he signed for Ecuadorian side SD Aucas. In 2009, he signed for Ecuadorian side Manta FC. In 2010, he signed for Ecuadorian side CD Técnico Universitario. In 2011, he signed for Ecuadorian side CD ESPOLI. After that, he signed for Ecuadorian side Club Sport 3 de Julio. He captained the club.

== Style of play ==
He mainly operates as a defender. He has been described as having "good technique and the determination that he shows in each match".

== Personal life ==
He has been a supporter of Ecuadorian side CS Emelec. He has been married. He has two daughters.
