= Armando Wila =

Ecuadorian footballer (born 1985)

Personal information
- Full name: Armando Lenin Wila Canga
- Date of birth: 12 May 1985 (age 41)
- Place of birth: San Lorenzo, Esmeraldas, Ecuador
- Height: 1.86 m (6 ft 1 in)
- Position: Forward

Team information
- Current team: LDU Portoviejo

Youth career
- 2000–2005: Deportivo Cuenca
- 2005: → Huaquillas (loan)

Senior career*
Years	Team	Apps	(Gls)
2005	Deportivo Cuenca	1	(0)
2006	→ Patria (loan)	7	(?)
2007	→ Norte America (loan)	8	(?)
2008	→ Rocafuerte (loan)	20	(?)
2009	→ Técnico Universitario (loan)	27	(6)
2010	Independiente DV	38	(9)
2011	Barcelona SC	35	(4)
2012	→ Puebla (loan)	9	(0)
2012–2014	LDU Loja	48	(12)
2014–2017	Universidad Católica	38	(20)
2015	→ Al-Nassr (loan)	8	(4)
2015–2016	→ Atlético Guayaquil (loan)	9	(0)
2016	→ Fuerza Amarilla (loan)	14	(2)
2017	Unión Comercio	4	(0)
2017–2018	Fuerza Amarilla	16	(6)
2018	CD Venecia	13	(3)
2018–2019	Santo Domingo		
2020–	CS 3 de Julio		

International career
2014	Ecuador	1	(0)
- * Club domestic league appearances and goals as of 21:46, 28 May 2019 (UTC)

Armando Lenin Wila Canga (born 12 May 1985) is an Ecuadorian footballer currently playing for LDU Portoviejo.

== Club career ==
Wila started his career at Deportivo Cuenca. With just one appearance for Cuenca, he was loaned out to many other clubs. In 2009, Wila was loaned out to Técnico Universitario where he has had the most success in his career. Currently, he is the team's second goalscorer after Omar Guerra with 6 goals.

In July 2009, in a game against ESPOLI, Wila was banned out of football for three months after he chested and argued with the referee about a play which got him a red card.

It was confirmed that Wila would be joining Barcelona for the 2015 Serie A.

In 2015, Wila joined Saudi Professional League side Al-Nassr FC.

In February 2019, Wila joined LDU Portoviejo alongside his older brother Polo Wila.

== International career ==
Wila was called up for an unofficial friendly on April 23, 2014, against the Serie A Rest of the World team composed of foreigners. He scored his 1st goal for Ecuador in this very same game. Ecuador went on to win the match 2–1. Wila made his "Official" debut for Ecuador against Netherlands on May 17, 2014. He was subbed out during the 2nd half due to an injury for Fidel Martínez.

== Career Statistics ==
As of match played 15 May 2015

Appearances and goals by club, season and competition
Club	Season	League			Cup		League cup		Continental		Total	
Club	Season	Division	Apps	Goals	Apps	Goals	Apps	Goals	Apps	Goals	Apps	Goals
Al-Nassr (loan)	2014–15	Saudi Professional League	8	4	3	0	1	0	4	0	16	4

== Honours ==
=== Club ===
Al-Nassr

- Saudi Professional League (1): 2014-15
