= Gonzalo Pizzichillo =

Uruguayan footballer (born 1984)

Gonzalo Pizzichillo Quintana (born 20 June 1984) is a Uruguayan former footballer who played as a striker.

== Career ==
Born in Paysandú, Pizzichillo has played in his home country for Peñarol, Central Español, Rampla Juniors, Montevideo Wanderers and Juventud. He was playing in the Mexican second division for Irapuato FC before joining Ecuadorian Serie A side Olmedo in 2010.

Pizzichillo signed for Cúcuta Deportivo in 2013.

== Teams ==
- (Uruguay) Peñarol 2004–2006
- (Uruguay) Central Español 2006
- (Uruguay) Rampla Juniors 2007
- (Italy) Olbia 2007
- (Liechtenstein) Vaduz 2008
- (Uruguay) Montevideo Wanderers 2008
- (Uruguay) Juventud 2008–2009
- (Mexico) Irapuato 2009–2010
- (Ecuador) Olmedo 2010–2011
- (Uruguay) El Tanque Sisley 2011–2012
- (Guatemala) Suchitepéquez 2012–2013
- (Colombia) Cúcuta Deportivo 2013
