= Sociedad de Lucha Contra el Cancer =

A child being treated in a SOLCA facility

Sociedad de Lucha Contra el Cancer (Society to Fight Cancer), a.k.a. SOLCA, is an Ecuadoran committee which disseminates techniques for fighting cancer. It was formed on December 7, 1951.

== History ==
During the 40s, Dr. Juan Tanca Marengo, a distinguished Ecuadorian doctor and humanist, worried about public health and all the different types of cancer, considered that it was necessary for him to share his oncologic knowledge with the medicine students and with doctors in general. His purpose was to establish prevention and healing campaigns, through the creation of an institute dedicated to the fight against cancer. December 7 of 1951, he calls a group of his closest doctor friends to found one of the public works with the most transcendence in Ecuador: the Sociedad de Lucha contra el cancer, or SOLCA.

In 1953, the government started to organize the creation of the building SOLCA, which was declared Society "fight with the cancer" in Ecuador. In 1957 the radiotheraphy and surgery department were built. With the pass of the years SOLCA have grown been one of the most important hospitals in Ecuador.

== Institute activities ==
=== Structure ===
Capacity of people: 155 beds
Average lodge: 5.5 days
Occupation average: 62.2%

=== Prevention ===
Not only it's important the fight against cancer, but it also is the prevention of it. Hence, the operation of this activity has been giving through interactive lectures, conferences, graphics and demonstrations among people.

a.- Professional Technicians from SOLCA.
b.- Professional Technicians from other institutions.
c.- Population in general.

=== Diseases treated ===
- Hodgkin adult diseases
- Head and Neck tumors
- Tumors located in tender parts
- Lung Cancer
- Thyroid Cancer
- Breast Cancer
- Leukemia
- Intestinal Cancer
- Esophagus Cancer
- Stomach Cancer

== Collaborators ==
Nowadays SOLCA is one of the most important hospitals in America. A lot of people, companies and industries collaborate daily with this institution. One of the most important and loyal is the ladies' committee, a group of ladies from any and all social status that offers their services without any kind of reward.
