= Atlético F.C. (Ecuador) =

Ecuadorian football club

Atlético Rojiblanco
- Full name: Atlético Fútbol Club
- Nicknames: Atleti de Guayaquil; Colchoneros
- Founded: 10 May 2022; 4 years ago
- Ground: Christian Benítez Betancourt
- Capacity: 10,150
- Chairman: Carlos Andretta
- Manager: Carlos Santamarina
- League: Ecuadorian Serie B
- 2025: Serie B, First stage: 7th of 12; Relegation group: 1st of 6
Home colours	Away colours	Third colours

Atlético Fútbol Club, known as Atlético Rojiblanco, is an Ecuadorian professional football club from the city of Guayaquil. Founded on 10 May 2022 as Club Atlético Vinotinto, they play in the Serie B.

== History ==
Founded on 10 May 2022 as Club Atlético Vinotinto in Quito by Venezuelan Franco Oliva, who wanted to honour his home country, the club achieved promotion Segunda Categoría de Pichincha in December of that year, after finishing second in their first ever competition. They also reached the national Segunda Categoría in the following two consecutive seasons (2023 and 2024).

On 7 November 2024, Atlético Vinotinto's owners acquired Cuniburo, changing the club's name to Vinotinto Ecuador and turning Atlético Vinotinto in their reserve team. In December, Atlético Vinotinto achieved a first-ever promotion to the Serie B after La Unión in the semi-finals, but lost the finals to 22 de Julio.

On 10 February 2026, after Vinotinto Ecuador suffered a relegation to the Serie B, their owners sold Atlético Vinotinto's spot in the second division to the Guayaquil Charitable Board, which reached an agreement with Atlético Madrid for the methodology and coordination methods; the new club was then named Atlético Fútbol Club.
