= Ezequiel Medrán =

Argentine footballer

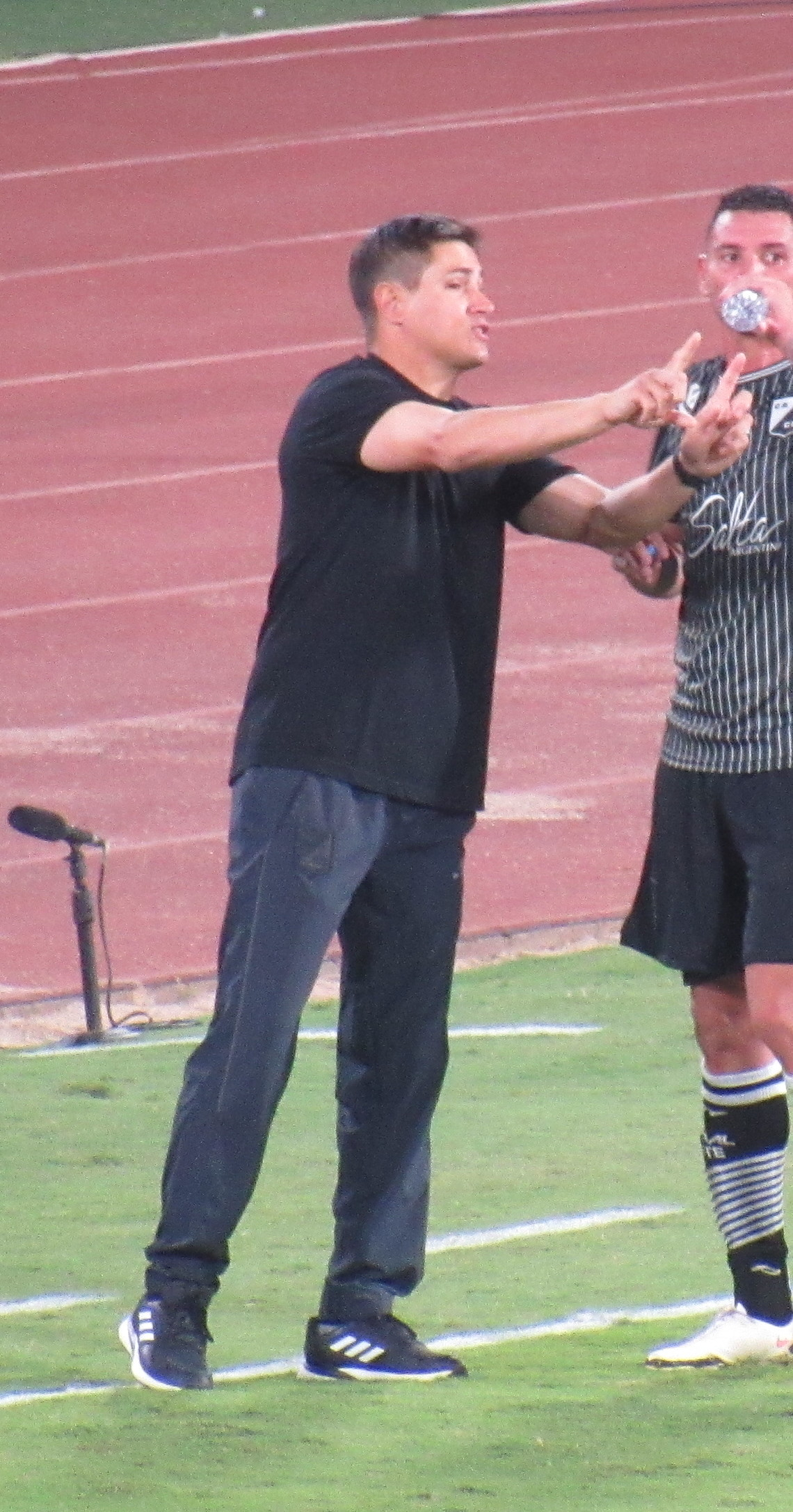

Personal information
- Full name: Ezequiel Alexis Medrán
- Date of birth: 20 December 1980 (age 45)
- Place of birth: Rafaela, Argentina
- Height: 1.78 m (5 ft 10 in)
- Position: Goalkeeper

Team information
- Current team: Emelec (manager)

Youth career
- Atlético Rafaela

Senior career*
Years	Team	Apps	(Gls)
2001–2004	Atlético Rafaela	107	(0)
2004–2008	Boca Juniors	2	(0)
2006–2007	→ Belgrano (loan)	1	(0)
2007	→ Lobos BUAP (loan)	14	(0)
2008	→ San Martín SJ (loan)	17	(0)
2009–2010	Cerro Porteño	13	(0)
2010–2011	Deportes La Serena	23	(0)
2012–2013	Cobresal	27	(1)
2014–2015	Deportes La Serena	17	(0)
2016	Central Norte	9	(0)
2016	Ben Hur	6	(0)

Managerial career
- 2018–2022: Central Norte
- 2022–2024: Atlético Rafaela
- 2024–2025: Gimnasia Mendoza
- 2025–2026: Colón
- 2026–: Emelec
- * Club domestic league appearances and goals

Ezequiel Alexis Medrán (born 20 December 1980) is a retired Argentine footballer who played as goalkeeper and current manager of Ecuadorian club Emelec.

== Coaching career ==
On 7 December 2018, Medrán was appointed manager of his former club, Torneo Federal A side Central Norte, in what would be his first ever coaching experience. In his first season at the club, he won promotion to the 2020 Primera Nacional. On 17 May 2022, Medrán was appointed manager of one of his other former clubs, Atlético de Rafaela.

== Honours ==
=== Club ===
Boca Juniors

- Apertura Tournament (2): 2005, 2008
- Clausura Tournament (1): 2006
- Copa Sudamericana (2): 2004, 2005
- Recopa Sudamericana (1): 2005

Cerro Porteño

- Paraguayan Primera División (1): 2009
