= Iván Borghello =

Argentine footballer

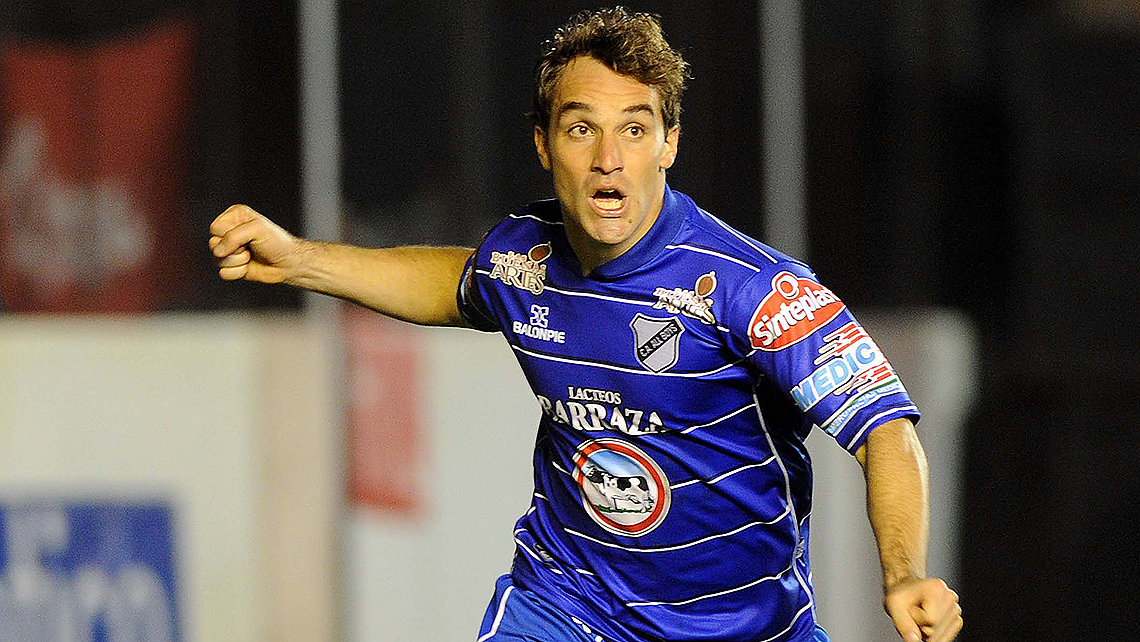

Personal information
- Full name: Iván Emiliano Borghello
- Date of birth: January 21, 1983 (age 43)
- Place of birth: Paraná, Argentina
- Height: 1.83 m (6 ft 0 in)
- Position: Striker

Team information
- Current team: Atlético Paraná

Senior career*
Years	Team	Apps	(Gls)
2001–2006	Newell's Old Boys	43	(6)
2006–2007	Santos Laguna B	23	(7)
2007–2008	Talleres Córdoba	38	(14)
2008–2009	Godoy Cruz	36	(8)
2009–2010	Deportivo Quito	18	(11)
2010	Newell's Old Boys	18	(1)
2011–2012	Barcelona SC	14	(3)
2012–2013	All Boys	34	(9)
2013–2014	Gimnasia	18	(0)
2014–2016	Huracán	18	(1)
2016	Bolívar	10	(1)
2016–	Atlético Paraná	19	(2)
- * Club domestic league appearances and goals as of 18 December 2017

Iván Emiliano Borghello (born 21 January 1983 in Paraná) is an Argentine football striker who plays for Club Atlético Paraná.

== Career ==
Borghello made his professional debut in 2001 for Newell's Old Boys. In 2004, he was part of the squad that won the Apertura 2004 championship.

In 2006, he moved to Mexico to play for Santos Laguna B but returned to Argentina after only one season to join Talleres de Córdoba of Primera B Nacional. In 2008, he was signed by newly promoted club Godoy Cruz as a reinforcement for the 2008–09 season.

For the 2010–11 Argentine Primera División season, Borghello returned to Newell's Old Boys.

== Honours ==
Season	Team	Title
Apertura 2004	Newell's Old Boys	Primera División Argentina
