= Matías Córdoba (footballer, born 1984) =

Argentine footballer

Personal information
- Full name: Matías Jesus Córdoba
- Date of birth: 7 October 1984 (age 42)
- Place of birth: Lanús, Argentina
- Height: 1.75 m (5 ft 9 in)
- Position: Attacking midfielder

Team information
- Current team: Leones (manager)

Youth career
- Argentinos Juniors

Senior career*
| Years | Team | Apps | (Gls) |
| 2004–2006 | Argentinos Juniors | 45 | (7) |
| 2006–2007 | Tigre | 25 | (0) |
| 2007–2008 | Real Salt Lake | 22 | (1) |
| 2008–2009 | Quilmes | 16 | (0) |
| 2009–2010 | Monagas | 12 | (2) |
| 2010–2011 | San Martín de Tucumán | 19 | (0) |
| 2011–2012 | Atlante | 18 | (0) |
| 2012–2013 | Deportes La Serena | 26 | (6) |
| 2013 | Perth Glory | 15 | (1) |
| 2013–2014 | Oriente Petrolero | 14 | (0) |
| 2014 | Naval | 16 | (0) |
| 2014–2015 | Brown de Adrogué | 15 | (2) |
| 2015–2016 | Alianza FC | 15 | (1) |
| 2016 | Penang | 23 | (8) |
| 2017–2018 | Barito Putera | 66 | (9) |
| Total | | 347 | (37) |

Managerial career
- 2022–2023: Puebla (assistant)
- 2024–2025: Dock Sud
- 2025–2026: Argentinos Juniors (reserves)
- 2026–: Leones
- * Club domestic league appearances and goals

Matías Jesús Córdoba (born 7 October 1984 in Lanús) is an Argentine football manager and former player who played as a midfielder. He is the current manager of Ecuadorian club Leones.

Córdoba formerly played for Argentinos Juniors, Real Salt Lake, Perth Glory, Penang FA, and PS Barito Putera in his football career.

== Playing career ==
Córdoba was formed in the storied youth ranks of Argentinos Juniors. He made his debut in the Primera Division Argentina with Argentinos Juniors in a 1–0 victory over Rosario Central on June 10, 2005. After spending three seasons at the club he was loaned to Club Atlético Tigre in 2007. Once his loan spell concluded, Argentinos Juniors loaned him out to MLS side Real Salt Lake.

Córdoba was later loaned to Quilmes on 2009, Monagas and San Martín de Tucumán on 2010 and currently he is loaned on the club Atlante F.C. of Mexico.

=== Gabala FK ===
At the beginning January 2013, Córdoba had a trial with Gabala of the Azerbaijan Premier League., which he cut short in order to sign with A-League team Perth Glory FC.

=== Perth Glory FC ===
On 8 March 2013, Cordoba scored his first goal for Glory, placing his shot across the keeper from outside the penalty box as Glory won 2–1 at the Newcastle Jets

=== Oriente Petrolero, Deportes Naval, Club Atlético Brown, Alianza F.C. ===
After left Perth Glory FC Cordoba had a brief stint with Oriente Petrolero, Deportes Naval, Club Atlético Brown, Alianza F.C., before signing permanently for Penang FA to play in Malaysia.

=== Penang FA ===
In November 2015, Cordoba signs for Malaysian side Penang FA, a professional association football club currently plays in the top division of Malaysian football, the Malaysia Super League. After a season with Penang FA, he parted ways after won the battle of relegation to stay top flight the following season.

=== Barito Putra ===
In early 2017, Cordoba signs for Indonesian side PS Barito Putera, Indonesian football club based in Banjarmasin, South Kalimantan, he's scored 4 goals and give 4 assists for team in season.
