= Raúl Antuña =

Argentine footballer

Personal information
- Full name: Raúl Adolfo Antuña
- Date of birth: 31 August 1973 (age 53)
- Place of birth: San Juan, Argentina
- Height: 1.85 m (6 ft 1 in)
- Position: Forward

Senior career*
Years	Team	Apps	(Gls)
1991–1992	San Martín San Juan	21	(3)
1992–1994	La Serena		
1995–1998	San Martín San Juan	63	(9)
1998	Elche	13	(0)
1998–1999	Gimnasia y Esgrima Jujuy	20	(0)
1999–2000	San Martín Mendoza	30	(9)
2000–2001	Instituto	35	(11)
2001–2002	San Martín San Juan	21	(3)
2002	Aucas	37	(6)
2003	Deportivo Quito	7	(1)
2003	→ Olmedo (loan)	13	(3)
2004	Deportivo Cuenca	35	(7)
2004	→ Unión Santa Fe	7	(2)
2005	Macará	14	(3)
2005–2006	Independiente Rivadavia	20	(2)
2006–2008	San Martín San Juan	42	(4)
2009	Deportivo Azogues	7	(0)
2009	Gimnasia y Tiro	9	(1)
2010	San Martín San Juan		

Managerial career
- 2011: Gimnasia y Tiro
- 2012: Sportivo Del Bono
- 2012–2013: Sportivo Peñarol
- 2014–2015: Atlético Palmira
- 2015–2016: Unión de Villa Krause
- 2016–2018: Sportivo Desamparados
- 2018–2019: Juventud Unida
- 2022: San Martín San Juan
- 2023: San Martín San Juan
- 2024–2025: San Martín San Juan
- 2025–2026: Orense
Medal record
First place	Ecuadorian Serie B	2003
First place	Ecuadorian Serie A	2004
First place	Ecuadorian Serie B	2005
- * Club domestic league appearances and goals

Raúl Adolfo Antuña (born 31 August 1973) is an Argentine football manager and former player who played as a forward. He is the current manager of Ecuadorian club Orense.
