= 2025 Ecuadorian Serie B =

LigaPro Serie B
- Season: 2025
- Dates: 18 March – 30 October 2025
- Matches: 155
- Goals: 353 (2.28 per match)

The 2025 Primera Categoría Serie B, is the 67th season of the Serie B, Ecuador's second tier football league, and the seventh under the management of the Liga Profesional de Fútbol del Ecuador (or LigaPro). The season began on 18 March and concluded on 30 October 2025.

== Teams ==
Club	City	Stadium	Capacity
22 de Julio	Esmeraldas	Estadio Folke Anderson	14,000
9 de Octubre	Guayaquil	Alejandro Ponce Noboa	5,000
Atlético Vinotinto	Cayambe	Estadio Olímpico Atahualpa	35,258
Chacaritas	Pelileo	Ciudad de Pelileo	8,000
Cumbayá	Cumbayá	Estadio Olímpico Atahualpa	35,258
Gualaceo	Gualaceo	Gerardo León Pozo	2,791
Guayaquil City	Guayaquil	Christian Benítez	10,152
Imbabura	Ibarra	Estadio Olímpico de Ibarra	18,600
Independiente Juniors	Sangolquí	Banco Guayaquil	12,000
Leones	Atuntaqui	Olímpico Jaime Terán	10,000
San Antonio	Ibarra	Olímpico de Ibarra	18,600
Vargas Torres	Esmeraldas	Folke Anderson	14,000

== First stage ==
=== League table ===
Pos	Team	Pld	W	D	L	GF	GA	GD	Pts	Qualification
1	Leones	22	11	7	4	26	14	+12	40	Qualification to Promotion round
2	Guayaquil City	22	10	7	5	31	16	+15	37	Qualification to Promotion round
3	Gualaceo	22	9	8	5	28	27	+1	35	Qualification to Promotion round
4	9 de Octubre	22	9	6	7	20	15	+5	33	Qualification to Promotion round
5	Independiente Juniors	22	9	6	7	22	21	+1	33	Qualification to Promotion round
6	San Antonio	22	9	5	8	20	19	+1	32	Qualification to Promotion round
7	Atlético Vinotinto	22	9	4	9	37	26	+11	31	Qualification to Relegation round
8	22 de Julio	22	7	7	8	20	31	−11	28	Qualification to Relegation round
9	Vargas Torres	22	5	11	6	26	22	+4	26	Qualification to Relegation round
10	Cumbayá	22	7	5	10	19	28	−9	26	Qualification to Relegation round
11	Imbabura	22	4	6	12	23	30	−7	18	Qualification to Relegation round
12	Chacaritas	22	3	8	11	21	44	−23	17	Qualification to Relegation round

Source: LigaPro
Rules for classification: 1) Points; 2) Goal difference; 3) Goals scored; 4) Away goals scored; 4) Head-to-head points; 5) Head-to-head goal difference; 6) Head-to-head away goals scored; 8) Draw.

== Final stages ==
=== Promotion round ===
Pos	Team	Pld	W	D	L	GF	GA	GD	Pts	Qualification
1	Guayaquil City (C, P)	32	16	10	6	44	22	+22	58	Promotion to 2026 Ecuadorian Serie A
2	Leones (P)	32	14	12	6	36	23	+13	54	Promotion to 2026 Ecuadorian Serie A
3	Independiente Juniors (Note: Reserve teams are ineligible for promotion.)	32	13	8	11	39	34	+5	47	Ineligible for promotion
4	9 de Octubre	32	12	10	10	35	26	+9	46	
5	Gualaceo	32	12	9	11	39	47	−8	45	
6	San Antonio	32	10	10	12	34	40	−6	40	Ineligible for promotion

Source: LigaPro
Rules for classification: 1) Points, 2) Goal difference, 3) Goals for, 4) Away goals for, 5) Head-to-head record, 6) Drawing of lots.
(C) Champions; (P) Promoted

=== Relegation round ===
Pos	Team	Pld	W	D	L	GF	GA	GD	Pts	Qualification
1	Atlético Vinotinto	32	12	9	11	50	31	+19	45	
2	Vargas Torres	32	9	16	7	38	26	+12	43	
3	Cumbayá	32	11	9	12	30	39	−9	42	
4	22 de Julio	32	9	11	12	27	47	−20	38	
5	Imbabura (R)	32	7	10	15	36	44	−8	31	Relegation to Segunda Categoría
6	Chacaritas (R)	32	4	12	16	31	60	−29	24	Relegation to Segunda Categoría

Source: LigaPro
Rules for classification: 1) Points, 2) Goal difference, 3) Goals for, 4) Away goals for, 5) Head-to-head record, 6) Drawing of lots.
(R) Relegated

== See also ==
- 2025 Ecuadorian Serie A
- 2025 Segunda Categoría
- 2025 Copa Ecuador
