= Estadio Etho Vega =

Stadium in Santo Domingo, Ecuador

Estadio Olímpico Etho Vega Baquero
- Estadio Olímpico
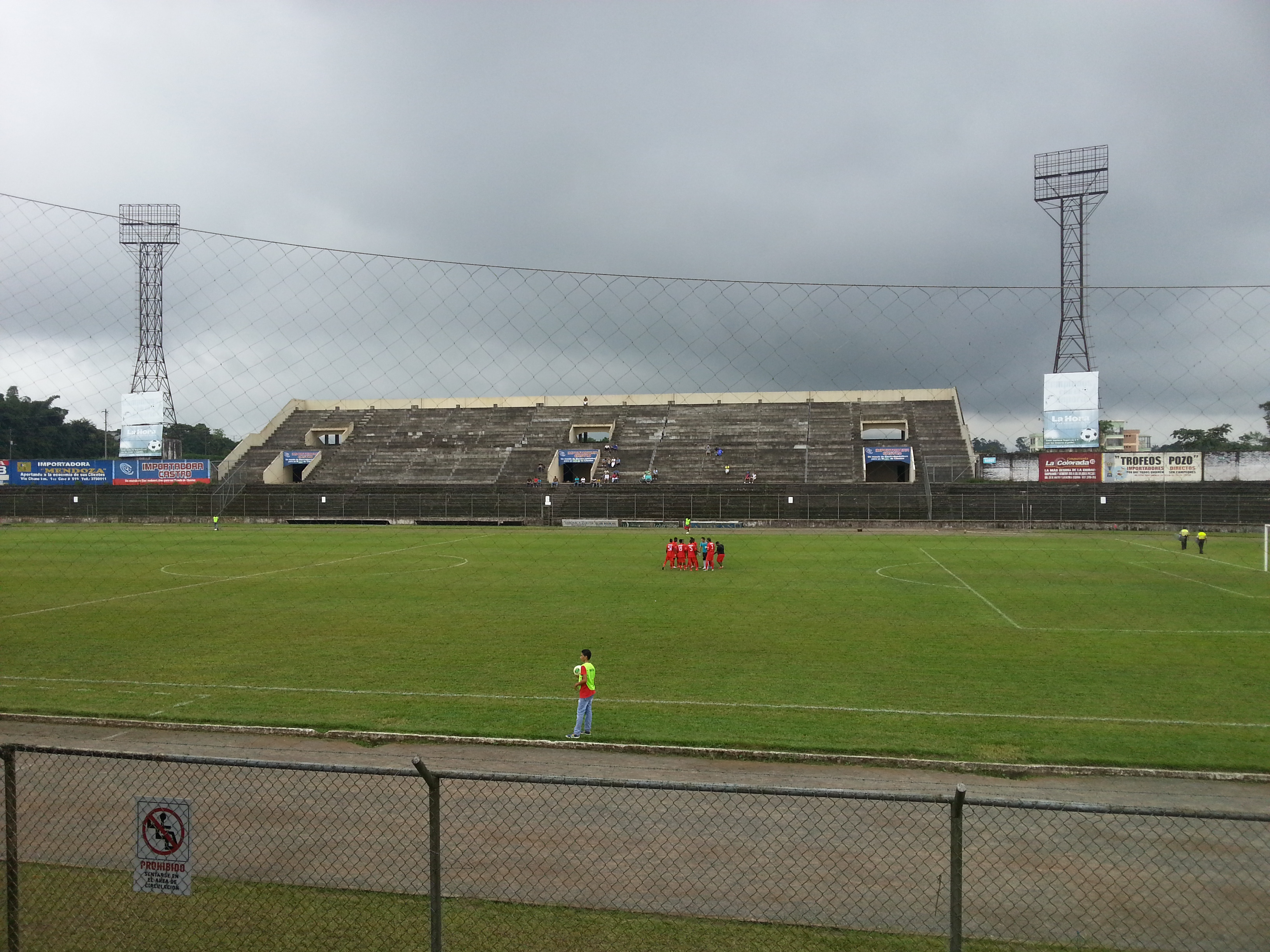
- Estadio etho vega
- Interactive map of Estadio Olímpico Etho Vega Baquero
- Full name: Estadio Olímpico Etho Vega Baquero
- Location: Santo Domingo, Ecuador
- Coordinates: 0°14′58.95″S 79°8′54.72″W
- Owner: Federación Deportiva de Santo Domingo de los Tsáchilas
- Operator: Federación Deportiva de Santo Domingo de los Tsáchilas
- Capacity: 10,172
- Surface: grass

Construction
- Opened: 1980

Tenant
- C.D. ESPOLI

The Estadio Olímpico Etho Vega Baquero, formerly named Estadio Olímpico Tsáchila, is a multi-use stadium in Santo Domingo, Ecuador. It is currently used mostly for football matches and is the home stadium of ESPOLI of the Ecuadorian Serie B. The stadium holds 10,172 spectators
