= Juan Carlos Anangonó =

Ecuadorian footballer (born 1989)

Personal information
- Full name: Juan Carlos Anangonó Campos
- Date of birth: March 29, 1989 (age 37)
- Place of birth: Ibarra, Ecuador
- Height: 1.73 m (5 ft 8 in)
- Position: Right back

Team information
- Current team: Cumbayá F.C.
- Number: 30

Youth career
- Valle del Chota
- 2005: → El Nacional (loan)
- 2006: → El Nacional (loan)

Senior career*
Years	Team	Apps	(Gls)
2007–2013	El Nacional	136	(1)
2014	Mushuc Runa	35	(0)
2015–2017	Universidad Católica	67	(1)
2018	Aucas	16	(0)
2019–2020	Técnico Universitario	4	(0)
- * Club domestic league appearances and goals as of 12:48, 11 June 2019 (UTC)

Juan Carlos Anangonó Campos (born March 29, 1989) is an Ecuadorian footballer currently playing for Cumbayá.
