= Efrén Mera =

Ecuadorian footballer (born 1985)

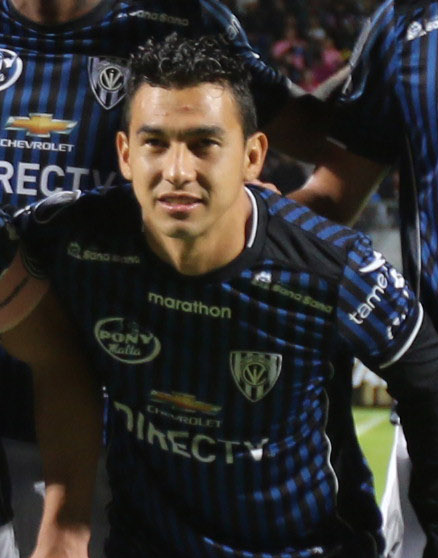

Personal information
- Full name: Efrén Alexander Mera Moreira
- Date of birth: 23 June 1985 (age 41)
- Place of birth: Manta, Ecuador
- Height: 1.75 m (5 ft 9 in)
- Position: Attacking midfielder

Youth career
- 1998–2000: Green Cross

Senior career*
Years	Team	Apps	(Gls)
2000–2011	Manta	305	(23)
2005	LDU Loja	13	(0)
2012–2013	→ Emelec (loan)	13	(2)
2015	Universidad Católica del Ecuador	30	(4)
2016	Delfín	41	(3)
2017–2021	Independiente del Valle	50	(6)
2022	Deportivo Cuenca	17	(1)
2023	Manta	13	(0)
Total		482	(39)

Managerial career
- 2024–2025: Manta
- * Club domestic league appearances and goals

Efrén Alexander Mera Moreira (born 23 June 1985), nicknamed "the Pup", is an Ecuadorian football manager and former player who played as an attacking midfielder.

== Honours ==
Manta

- Serie B: 2018

Independiente del Valle

- Copa Sudamericana: 2019
- Serie A: 2021
