= Leones F.C. (Ecuador) =

Ecuadorian football club

Leones
- Full name: Leones Fútbol Club
- Nicknames: La Manada; El Felino; La Fiera; El Rugido del Norte
- Founded: 4 November 2017; 8 years ago
- Ground: Olímpico Jaime Terán
- Capacity: 10,000
- Chairman: Esteban Paz
- Manager: Matias Cordoba
- League: Ecuadorian Serie A
- 2025: Serie B, 2nd of 12 (promoted)
- Website: www.leonesfc.com.ec
Home colours	Away colours	Third colours

Leones Fútbol Club is an Ecuadorian professional football club from the city of Atuntaqui. Founded on 4 November 2017, they play in the Serie A after achieving promotion from the Serie B in 2025.

== History ==
Founded on 4 November 2017 as Club Deportivo Profesional Leones del Norte, the club first reached the Segunda Categoría in the following year, winning their first regional title in 2020. The club continued to win the Segunda Categoría de Imbabura in the following three years, before winning the national third division in 2023, achieving a first-ever promotion to the Serie B.

In July 2024, Leones del Norte changed name to Leones Fútbol Club, also changing their kit and colors. They finished eighth in their first season in the second division, and achieved a first-ever promotion to the Serie A on 24 October 2025.

== Achievements ==
- Serie B
  - Runners-up (1): 2025
- Segunda Categoría
  - Winners (1): 2023
- Segunda Categoría de Imbabura
  - Winners (1): 2020, 2021, 2022, 2023

== Players ==
=== Current squad ===
As of 2 March 2026

Note: Flags indicate national team as defined under FIFA eligibility rules; some limited exceptions apply. Players may hold more than one non-FIFA nationality.

No.	Pos.	Nation	Player
2	DF	ECU	Jordan Moran
3	DF	ECU	Frixon Vargas
5	DF	ARG	Tobías Coppo
6	MF	ARG	Emiliano Griffa
9	FW	ARG	Santiago Arrieta
11	MF	ARG	Martin Caramuto
13	MF	ECU	Jorge Cabeza
16	DF	ECU	Maiky de la Cruz
17	FW	ECU	Jairo Mairongo
19	MF	ECU	Oscar Pepinos
20	MF	ECU	Mayer Mendez
22	GK	ECU	Jeferson Arroyo

No.	Pos.	Nation	Player
23	DF	ARG	Nicolás Monserrat
24	GK	ECU	Jose Angulo
25	DF	ARG	Brian Kreiman
27	FW	ECU	Nestor Caicedo
32	MF	ECU	Ariel Aguas
34	DF	ECU	Segundo Portocarrero
40	FW	ECU	Juan Luis Anangonó
45	GK	ECU	Leonel Nazareno
50	DF	ECU	Miguel Caicedo
55	MF	ECU	Ronny Borja
99	MF	ECU	Cristhian Solano
