= Franco Ayunta =

Argentine footballer

Personal information
- Date of birth: 29 November 2002 (age 23)
- Position: Forward

Team information
- Current team: Temperley

Senior career*
Years	Team	Apps	(Gls)
2019–	Temperley	73	(10)
2024	→ San Telmo (loan)	14	(2)
- * Club domestic league appearances and goals as of 17:27, 27 June 2025 (UTC)

Franco Ayunta (born 29 November 2002) is an Argentine footballer currently playing as a forward for Temperley.

== Career statistics ==
=== Club ===
As of 12 April 2020.

Club	Season	League			Cup		Continental		Other		Total	
Club	Season	Division	Apps	Goals	Apps	Goals	Apps	Goals	Apps	Goals	Apps	Goals
Temperley	2019–20	Primera B Nacional	1	0	0	0	–		0	0	1	0
Career total			1	0	0	0	0	0	0	0	1	0
