= Miguel Bravo =

Ecuadorian footballer (born 1986)

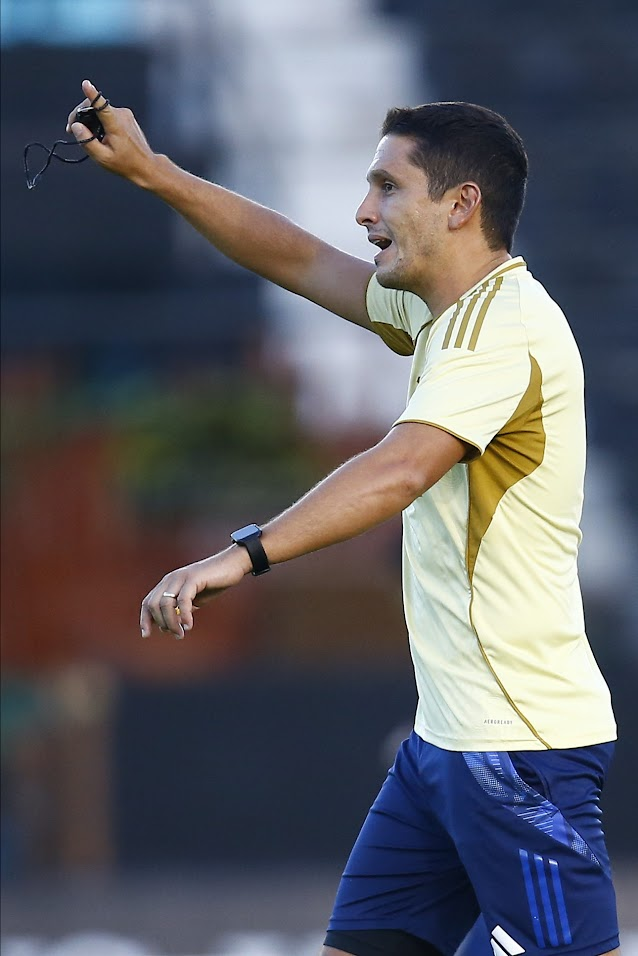

Personal information
- Full name: Miguel Ángel Bravo Prado
- Date of birth: 29 October 1986 (age 39)
- Place of birth: Quito, Ecuador
- Height: 1.79 m (5 ft 10 in)
- Position: Midfielder

Team information
- Current team: Cancún (manager)

Youth career
- 2002–2005: LDU Quito

Senior career*
Years	Team	Apps	(Gls)
2005–2008	ESPOLI	104	(14)
2009–2010	Emelec	1	(0)
2009	→ Universidad Católica del Ecuador (loan)	13	(1)
2010	→ Olmedo (loan)	40	(3)
2011–2012	Deportivo Cuenca	77	(2)
2013	El Nacional	23	(1)
2014	Deportivo Quito	2	(0)
2014–2015	Deportivo Cuenca	34	(2)
2016	Clan Juvenil	11	(0)

Managerial career
- 2020: América de Quito
- 2021: Chacaritas
- 2022: Independiente Juniors
- 2023–2025: Ecuador U20
- 2023–2025: Ecuador U23
- 2025–: Cancún
- * Club domestic league appearances and goals

Miguel Ángel Bravo Prado (born 29 October 1986 in Quito, Ecuador) is an Ecuadorian football manager and former player who played as an attacking midfielder. He is the current manager of Liga de Expansión MX club Cancún.

== Playing career ==
Bravo started his career in the youth ranks of L.D.U. Quito, playing for the U-16, U-18, and U-20 teams. He was promoted to the first team. In 2005, he made his professional debut with Espoli, where he stayed for three years and helped the team achieve promotion to the Serie A in 2007. In 2008, his performances in the Serie A earned him call-ups to the Ecuador national football team for several friendly matches. For the 2009 season, he signed with Emelec in Guayaquil.

Midway through the 2009 season, he was loaned to Universidad Católica in the Serie B, helping the club win promotion to the top flight. In 2010, he transferred to Olmedo, making over 40 appearances and scoring 3 goals. In 2011, he joined Deportivo Cuenca, establishing himself as a regular starter in 39 matches, before moving to El Nacional for the 2013 season.

He ended his playing career in early 2017 while playing for Clan Juvenil in the Ecuadorian Serie B.

== Managerial career ==
Bravo began his professional managerial career in the 2020 season with América de Quito in the Ecuadorian Serie B. The following year, he took charge of Chacaritas.

In 2022, Bravo joined the youth setup of Independiente del Valle, becoming the manager of their reserve team, Independiente Juniors. During that same year, he served as the interim manager for Independiente del Valle's first team and their U-20 squad.

On 27 February 2023, the Ecuadorian Football Federation officially appointed him as the manager of the Ecuador U-20 national team, leading them in the 2023 FIFA U-20 World Cup held in Indonesia. In late 2023, he was appointed to manage the Ecuador U-23 team for the 2024 CONMEBOL Pre-Olympic Tournament in Venezuela, while also managing the U-18 squad. He concluded his tenure with the Ecuadorian youth national teams in March 2025.

In mid-2025, he began his first international managerial stint after being appointed as the manager of Cancún F.C. in the Mexican Liga de Expansión MX.
