= Guayaquil City F.C. =

Ecuadorian professional football club

Guayaquil City
- Full name: Guayaquil City Fútbol Club
- Nicknames: El Equipo de la Ciudad; Los Ciudadanos; Los Ciitadinos; Los Celestes; Los Albicelestes
- Founded: 7 November 2007; 18 years ago
- Ground: Estadio Christian Benítez Betancourt, Guayaquil, Ecuador
- Capacity: 10,152
- President: Christian Zamora
- Manager: Pool Gavilánez
- League: LigaPro Serie A
- 2025: Serie B, 1st of 12 (promoted)
- Website: www.guayaquilcityfc.com
Home colours	Away colours	Third colours

Guayaquil City F.C. (known as C.D. River Ecuador until 2017) is an Ecuadorian professional football club based in Guayaquil. They currently play in the country's top tier-level football league, the Ecuadorian Serie A after to winning from the Ecuadorian Serie B at the end of the 2025 season.

== History ==
Formed in 2007 as Club Deportivo River Plate Ecuador (or River Ecuador), the club was founded through a partnership with the dominant Argentinian side River Plate. By 2010 the relationship had already ended, but the club continued to operate under its given name and with River Plate's traditional red kit colour.

On 11 July 2017 it was announced that River Ecuador had renamed themselves to Guayaquil City Fútbol Club, changing their strip to sky blue and white horizontal stripes. The new name, kit colours and badge design prompted a number of claims that the change in identity was the result of a takeover by the Manchester City-linked City Football Group, though no evidence of this was forthcoming.

== Statistics ==
=== Serie A ===
- Seasons: 9 (2015–2023)
- Matches played: 132
  - Wins: 38
  - Draws: 32
  - Losses: 62
- Goals for: 137
- Goals against: 184
- Goals difference: -47
- Points: 146
- All-time position: 7th

=== Serie B ===
- Seasons: 5 (2010–2014)

=== Segunda Categoría ===
- Seasons: 2 (2008–2009)

== Players ==
=== Current squad ===
As of 2 March 2026

Note: Flags indicate national team as defined under FIFA eligibility rules; some limited exceptions apply. Players may hold more than one non-FIFA nationality.

No.	Pos.	Nation	Player
1	GK	ECU	Gilmar Napa
3	DF	ECU	Yardely Rodríguez
4	DF	ECU	Erick Ladines
5	MF	ECU	Madison Julio
6	DF	ECU	Roger Arias
8	MF	ECU	Jean Humanante
9	FW	PAR	Manu Palma
10	MF	ECU	Damián Díaz
11	FW	ECU	Edinson Mero
12	GK	ECU	Rodrigo Perea
15	MF	ECU	Kevin Sambonino
16	DF	ECU	Jonathan Ordóñez
17	DF	ECU	Junior Ayoví

No.	Pos.	Nation	Player
19	FW	ECU	Anderson Naula
20	MF	URU	Santiago Laurino
21	FW	ECU	Jose Miguel Andrade
23	FW	ECU	Edwin Angulo
24	MF	URU	Gerónimo Plada
25	GK	ECU	Eved Sanchez
28	MF	ECU	Janus Vivar
29	DF	ECU	Joshué Quiñónez
50	MF	ECU	Cesar Parra
51	DF	ECU	Esnáider Cabezas
70	FW	ECU	Pablo Mancilla
80	MF	URU	Pablo González

== Managers ==
- (Ecuador) Kléber Fajardo (2007)
- (Argentina) César Vigevani (2008–2010)
- (Ecuador) Kléber Fajardo (2012)
- (Ecuador) Humberto Pizarro (2012–2015)
- (Argentina) Marcelo Trobbiani (2015)
- (Uruguay) Guillermo Sanguinetti (2016)
- (Argentina) Pablo Trobbiani (interim) (2016)
- (Spain) Ángel Gómez (2017)
- (Argentina) Gabriel Perrone (2017)
- (Ecuador) Pool Gavilánez (2017–present)
