= Orense S.C. =

Association football club in Ecuador

Orense
- Full name: Orense Sporting Club
- Nicknames: El Vendaval Verde; La amenaza verde Fortín bananero Los bananeros
- Founded: 15 December 2009; 16 years ago
- Ground: Estadio 9 de Mayo
- Capacity: 17,800
- Chairman: Martha Romero
- Manager: Hernán Torres
- League: Ecuadorian Serie A
- 2025: First stage: 5th of 16; First hexagonal: 5th of 6
Home colours	Away colours	Third colours

Orense Sporting Club is a professional football club from the city of Machala, Ecuador that plays in Serie A.

== Achievements ==
- Serie B
  - Winner (1): 2019

== Players ==
=== Current squad ===
As of 20 August, 2025

Note: Flags indicate national team as defined under FIFA eligibility rules; some limited exceptions apply. Players may hold more than one non-FIFA nationality.

No.	Pos.	Nation	Player
2	DF	ECU	Bryan Quiñónez
3	DF	ECU	Sixto Mina
5	DF	ARG	Alan Lorenzo
6	DF	ARG	Stefano Callegari
7	MF	ECU	Sergio Vasquez
8	MF	ECU	Diego Armas
9	FW	ARG	Paul Charpentier
10	MF	ARG	Valentín Burgoa (on loan from Godoy Cruz)
11	FW	ARG	Agustín Herrera
12	GK	ECU	Rolando Silva
13	MF	ECU	Ángel Mena
14	MF	ECU	Erick Plúas
15	DF	ECU	Beder Caicedo

No.	Pos.	Nation	Player
17	MF	ECU	Bruno Caicedo
19	FW	ECU	Michael Bermúdez (on loan from LDU Quito)
21	MF	ARG	Gonzalo Rostagno
22	GK	ECU	Jordy Ortiz
23	DF	ECU	Randy Meneses
25	MF	ECU	Renny Jaramillo
26	MF	ECU	Nixon Molina
31	DF	ECU	Pedro Velasco
45	DF	ECU	Óscar Quiñónez (on loan from Racing Club de Montevideo)
54	FW	ECU	Erick Zambrano
57	MF	ECU	Ariel Suárez
77	DF	ECU	Bryan Viñán

=== Out on loan ===
Note: Flags indicate national team as defined under FIFA eligibility rules; some limited exceptions apply. Players may hold more than one non-FIFA nationality.

No.	Pos.	Nation	Player
