= 2021 LigaPro Serie A =

LigaPro Serie A
- Season: 2021
- Dates: 19 February – 12 December 2021
- Champions: Independiente del Valle (1st title)
- Relegated: Manta; Olmedo
- Copa Libertadores: Independiente del Valle; Emelec; Universidad Católica; Barcelona
- Copa Sudamericana: 9 de Octubre; LDU Quito; Mushuc Runa; Delfín
- Matches: 240
- Goals: 654 (2.73 per match)
- Top goalscorer: Jonatan Bauman (26 goals)
- Biggest home win: Mushuc Runa 6–1 Delfín (17 July); Dep. Cuenca 5–0 Olmedo (26 September); Ind. del Valle 5–0 Olmedo (31 October)
- Biggest away win: Mushuc Runa 2–6 U. Católica (9 May); Manta 0–4 Emelec (18 July)
- Highest scoring: Mushuc Runa 2–6 U. Católica (9 May)

The 2021 Campeonato Ecuatoriano de Fútbol Serie A, known as the LigaPro Betcris 2021 for sponsorship purposes, was the 63rd season of the Serie A, Ecuador's top tier football league, and the third under the management of the Liga Profesional de Fútbol del Ecuador (or LigaPro). The season began on 19 February and ended on 12 December 2021.

Independiente del Valle were the champions, winning their first league title by defeating Emelec in the finals by a 4–2 aggregate score. Barcelona were the defending champions, having won the previous season.

== Format ==
On 1 January 2021, LigaPro president Miguel Ángel Loor confirmed that the 2021 season would be contested by 16 teams and the competition would be played under the same format as the previous season. Three stages were played, with the first and second ones to be played as single round-robin tournaments with all teams playing each other once for a total of 15 matches per stage. The first stage fixture was reversed for the second stage, and the top teams at the end of each stage qualified for the final stage as well as the Copa Libertadores group stage. The finals were a double-legged series between the winners of both stages with a penalty shoot-out deciding the champion in case of a tie in points and goals scored. In case a team won both stages of the season, the finals would not be played and that team would win the championship.

An aggregate table including the matches of both the first and second stages was used to decide international qualification and relegation, with the best two teams (other than the stage winners) qualifying for the Copa Libertadores, the next best three teams qualifying for the Copa Sudamericana, while the remaining Copa Sudamericana berth would be awarded to the champions of the 2021 Copa Ecuador, which was eventually cancelled. The bottom two teams of the aggregate table at the end of the season will be relegated to Serie B.

== Teams ==
16 teams competed in the season. LDU Portoviejo and El Nacional were relegated after finishing in the bottom two places of the aggregate table of the previous season, being replaced by 2020 Serie B champions 9 de Octubre and runners-up Manta.

=== Stadia and locations ===
Locations of the 2021 Serie A clubs.

Team	City	Stadium	Capacity
9 de Octubre	Guayaquil	Modelo Alberto Spencer Herrera	42,000
Aucas	Quito	Gonzalo Pozo Ripalda	21,689
Barcelona	Guayaquil	Monumental Banco Pichincha	57,267
Delfín	Manta	Jocay	17,834
Deportivo Cuenca	Cuenca	Banco del Austro Alejandro Serrano Aguilar	18,549
Emelec	Guayaquil	Banco del Pacífico Capwell	40,020
Guayaquil City	Guayaquil	Christian Benítez Betancourt	10,152
Independiente del Valle	Sangolquí	Banco Guayaquil	12,000
LDU Quito	Quito	Rodrigo Paz Delgado	41,575
Macará	Ambato	Bellavista	16,467
Manta	Manta	Jocay	17,834
Mushuc Runa	Ambato	COAC Mushuc Runa	8,200
Olmedo	Riobamba	Olímpico	7,233
Orense	Machala	9 de Mayo	16,456
Técnico Universitario	Ambato	Bellavista	16,467
Universidad Católica	Quito	Olímpico Atahualpa	35,258

=== Personnel and kits ===
Team	Manager	Kit manufacturer	Shirt sponsor
9 de Octubre	(Ecuador) Juan Carlos León	Jasa Evolution	GolTV Play
Aucas	(Venezuela) Héctor Bidoglio	Umbro	Cooperativa San Francisco Ltda.
Barcelona	(Argentina) Fabián Bustos	Marathon	Pilsener
Delfín	(Argentina) Horacio Montemurro	Baldo's	Banco del Pacífico
Deportivo Cuenca	(Uruguay) Guillermo Sanguinetti	Lotto	Chubb Seguros
Emelec	(Spain) Ismael Rescalvo	Adidas	Tubos Pacífico
Guayaquil City	(Ecuador) Pool Gavilánez	Astro	Cooperativa San Francisco Ltda.
Independiente del Valle	(Portugal) Renato Paiva	Marathon	Chery; Banco Guayaquil
LDU Quito	(Argentina) Pablo Marini	Puma	Banco Pichincha
Macará	(Ecuador) Paúl Vélez	Boman	Cooperativa San Francisco Ltda.
Manta	(Argentina) Fabián Frías	Astro	Atún Isabel
Mushuc Runa	(Ecuador) Geovanny Cumbicus	Boman	Cooperativa Mushuc Runa
Olmedo	(Ecuador) Héctor González	Boman	Cooperativa Daquilema
Orense	(Spain) Andrés García	Elohim	Banco de Machala
Técnico Universitario	(Colombia) José Eugenio Hernández	Boman	Cooperativa San Francisco Ltda.
Universidad Católica	(Argentina) Miguel Rondelli (Ecuador) Omar Andrade (caretakers)	Umbro	Banco Pichincha

=== Managerial changes ===
Team	Outgoing manager	Manner of departure	Date of vacancy	Position in table	Incoming manager	Date of appointment
First stage
Delfín	(Argentina) Horacio Montemurro	End of caretaker spell	19 December 2020	Pre-season	(Ecuador) Paúl Vélez	27 December 2020
Mushuc Runa	(Argentina) Ricardo Dillon	End of contract	19 December 2020	Pre-season	(Ecuador) Geovanny Cumbicus	24 December 2020
Independiente del Valle	(Spain) Miguel Ángel Ramírez	Resigned	20 December 2020	Pre-season	(Portugal) Renato Paiva	25 December 2020
Olmedo	(Ecuador) Geovanny Cumbicus	End of contract	20 December 2020	Pre-season	(Argentina) Pablo Trobbiani	27 December 2020
Macará	(Ecuador) Paúl Vélez	End of contract	21 December 2020	Pre-season	(Uruguay) Eduardo Favaro	25 December 2020
Aucas	(Argentina) Darío Tempesta	Sacked	14 March 2021	10th	(Venezuela) Héctor Bidoglio	16 March 2021
Deportivo Cuenca	(Argentina) Guillermo Duró	Promoted to sporting director	18 May 2021	12th	(Uruguay) Guillermo Sanguinetti	18 May 2021
Orense	(Argentina) Patricio Lara	Sacked	31 May 2021	14th	(Spain) Andrés García	6 June 2021
LDU Quito	(Uruguay) Pablo Repetto	Mutual consent	16 June 2021	7th	(Argentina) Pablo Marini (Note: Gabriel Di Noia was caretaker manager during the 2021 Supercopa Ecuador.)	25 June 2021
Olmedo	(Argentina) Pablo Trobbiani	Resigned	13 July 2021	16th	(Ecuador) César Ramos (caretaker)	14 July 2021
Second stage
Delfín	(Ecuador) Paúl Vélez	Mutual consent	31 July 2021	8th	(Argentina) Horacio Montemurro	4 August 2021
Macará	(Uruguay) Eduardo Favaro	Sacked	3 August 2021	15th	(Ecuador) Paúl Vélez	5 August 2021
Olmedo	(Ecuador) César Ramos	End of caretaker spell	5 August 2021	16th	(Ecuador) Luis Espinel	5 August 2021
Olmedo	(Ecuador) Luis Espinel	Resigned	28 September 2021	16th	(Ecuador) Nelson Brito	28 September 2021
Universidad Católica	(Colombia) Santiago Escobar	Resigned	25 October 2021	4th	(Argentina) Miguel Rondelli (Ecuador) Omar Andrade (Note: Caretaker managers until the end of the season.)	25 October 2021
Olmedo	(Ecuador) Nelson Brito	Mutual consent	1 November 2021	16th	(Ecuador) Héctor González	1 November 2021

== First stage ==
The first stage began on 19 February and ended on 19 July 2021.

=== Standings ===
Pos	Team	Pld	W	D	L	GF	GA	GD	Pts	Qualification
1	Emelec	15	10	4	1	29	14	+15	34	Advance to Finals and qualification for Copa Libertadores group stage
2	Barcelona	15	9	4	2	31	13	+18	31	
3	Independiente del Valle	15	8	3	4	27	18	+9	27	
4	Universidad Católica	15	7	4	4	29	18	+11	25	
5	Mushuc Runa	15	7	4	4	29	21	+8	25	
6	LDU Quito	15	6	7	2	22	19	+3	25	
7	Macará	15	6	5	4	17	17	0	23	
8	9 de Octubre	15	6	2	7	22	21	+1	20	
9	Aucas	15	5	4	6	27	26	+1	19	
10	Delfín	15	4	6	5	19	25	−6	18	
11	Deportivo Cuenca	15	4	4	7	14	18	−4	16	
12	Manta	15	4	4	7	18	25	−7	16	
13	Técnico Universitario	15	3	4	8	11	17	−6	13	
14	Orense	15	3	3	9	14	24	−10	12	
15	Guayaquil City	15	2	4	9	11	30	−19	10	
16	Olmedo (Note: Olmedo were deducted three points as punishment for failing to pay their creditors.)	15	2	6	7	13	27	−14	9	

Source: LigaPro, Soccerway
Rules for classification: 1) Points, 2) Goal difference, 3) Goals for, 4) Away goals for, 5) Head-to-head record, 6) Drawing of lots.

=== Results ===
Home \ Away	9OC	AUC	BSC	DEL	CUE	EME	GUA	IDV	LDQ	MAC	MAN	MUS	OLM	ORE	TEC	CAT
9 de Octubre	—	1–3	0–1	—	2–1	—	4–0	—	—	—	2–0	1–2	2–0	—	—	1–0
Aucas	—	—	—	3–3	2–0	2–3	3–0	3–4	—	—	—	—	1–3	—	0–2	—
Barcelona	—	3–0 (Note: Match ended after 20 minutes of play and awarded 3–0 to Barcelona by walkover due to the withdrawal of Aucas player Johan Lara by injury, leaving the team below the minimum number of players required per tournament regulations (seven). The score at the time of suspension was 2–0.)	—	2–1	—	1–1	—	2–2	—	3–0	—	—	4–0	2–0	3–0	—
Delfín	2–2	—	—	—	1–1	—	1–1	—	1–1	2–0	—	—	2–4	1–1	—	—
Deportivo Cuenca	—	—	1–0	—	—	—	3–0	—	2–2	—	—	1–2	—	1–0	1–0	0–1
Emelec	0–1	—	—	1–0	4–1	—	1–0	0–0	1–1	—	—	—	—	—	2–0	—
Guayaquil City	—	—	0–3	—	—	—	—	—	2–2	3–1	0–3	0–0	—	4–1	—	1–2
Independiente del Valle	2–1	—	—	2–0	0–0	—	3–0	—	3–1	—	—	2–0	—	—	—	2–3
LDU Quito	4–2	1–3	2–2	—	—	—	—	—	—	2–1	1–0	0–0	—	2–1	—	2–1
Macará	3–2	1–0	—	—	1–0	1–1	—	3–1	—	—	—	—	—	1–0	1–1	—
Manta	—	1–1	2–3	1–2	1–0	0–4	—	2–1	—	1–1	—	—	—	—	0–2	—
Mushuc Runa	—	1–3	2–2	6–1	—	1–2	—	—	—	0–0	4–2	—	4–0	—	—	2–6
Olmedo	—	—	—	—	2–2	2–3	0–0	1–3	0–0	0–2	1–1	—	—	—	—	—
Orense	3–1	2–2	—	—	—	2–3	—	2–0	—	—	0–1	0–2	0–0	—	—	0–3
Técnico Universitario	0–0	—	—	0–1	—	—	3–0	0–2	0–1	—	—	1–3	0–0	1–2	—	—
Universidad Católica	—	1–1	2–0	0–1	—	2–3	—	—	—	1–1	3–3	—	3–0 (Note: Match awarded 3–0 to Universidad Católica due to a breach of the competition's financial regulations and lack of cleared players by Olmedo.)	—	1–1	—

Source: LigaPro, Soccerway
Legend: Blue = home team win; Yellow = draw; Red = away team win.

== Second stage ==
=== Standings ===
Pos	Team	Pld	W	D	L	GF	GA	GD	Pts	Qualification
1	Independiente del Valle	15	10	4	1	29	9	+20	34	Advance to Finals and qualification for Copa Libertadores group stage
2	Emelec	15	9	3	3	30	15	+15	30	
3	9 de Octubre	15	9	3	3	25	17	+8	30	
4	Universidad Católica	15	8	5	2	25	15	+10	29	
5	LDU Quito	15	6	5	4	27	22	+5	23	
6	Delfín	15	6	4	5	25	20	+5	22	
7	Técnico Universitario	15	5	7	3	13	9	+4	22	
8	Aucas	15	5	5	5	20	17	+3	20	
9	Barcelona	15	6	2	7	20	20	0	20	
10	Guayaquil City	15	6	2	7	16	18	−2	20	
11	Orense	15	4	7	4	14	13	+1	19	
12	Deportivo Cuenca	15	4	4	7	25	24	+1	16	
13	Mushuc Runa	15	4	4	7	12	21	−9	16	
14	Macará	15	3	4	8	18	29	−11	13	
15	Manta	15	2	6	7	11	21	−10	12	
16	Olmedo	15	0	1	14	9	49	−40	1	

Source: LigaPro, Soccerway
Rules for classification: 1) Points, 2) Goal difference, 3) Goals for, 4) Away goals for, 5) Head-to-head record, 6) Drawing of lots.

=== Results ===
Home \ Away	9OC	AUC	BSC	DEL	CUE	EME	GUA	IDV	LDQ	MAC	MAN	MUS	OLM	ORE	TEC	CAT
9 de Octubre	—	—	—	1–0	—	2–2	—	1–0	4–1	1–1	—	—	—	3–1	0–1	—
Aucas	1–1	—	1–0	—	—	—	—	—	1–0	2–4	3–0	1–1	—	0–0	—	1–2
Barcelona	1–3	—	—	—	3–2	—	2–1	—	0–2	—	2–0	4–0	—	—	—	1–1
Delfín	—	1–2	4–1	—	—	1–2	—	0–0	—	—	2–1	3–0	—	—	1–1	0–2
Deportivo Cuenca	3–1	2–1	—	2–3	—	0–1	—	1–1	—	1–1	1–0	—	5–0	—	—	—
Emelec	—	2–2	2–1	—	—	—	—	—	—	3–0	4–0	2–0	4–0	1–0	—	2–2
Guayaquil City	0–1	1–0	—	2–1	2–1	0–1	—	0–2	—	—	—	—	4–2	—	1–0	—
Independiente del Valle	—	1–0	1–0	—	—	3–2	—	—	—	4–0	1–1	—	5–0	3–2	1–1	—
LDU Quito	—	—	—	1–1	3–3	3–2	3–1	0–2	—	—	—	—	4–0	—	1–0	—
Macará	—	—	1–1	2–3	—	—	0–2	—	2–1	—	1–2	1–1	3–2	—	—	1–2
Manta	1–3	—	—	—	—	—	1–1	—	2–2	—	—	0–0	3–0	0–0	—	0–1
Mushuc Runa	1–2	—	—	—	1–0	—	1–0	0–2	1–3	—	—	—	—	0–0	0–1	—
Olmedo	1–2	1–4	0–2	1–3	—	—	—	—	—	—	—	2–5	—	0–2	0–0	0–3
Orense	—	—	1–0	2–2	1–1	—	2–0	—	1–1	2–1	—	—	—	—	0–0	—
Técnico Universitario	—	1–1	1–2	—	3–1	1–0	—	—	—	2–0	0–0	—	—	—	—	1–1
Universidad Católica	2–0	—	—	—	3–2	—	1–1	1–3	2–2	—	—	0–1	—	1–0	—	—

Source: LigaPro, Soccerway
Legend: Blue = home team win; Yellow = draw; Red = away team win.

== Finals ==
The finals (Third stage) were played by Emelec (first stage winners) and Independiente del Valle (second stage winners). The winners of the double-legged series were the Serie A champions and earned the Ecuador 1 berth in the 2022 Copa Libertadores, and the losers were the Serie A runners-up and earned the Ecuador 2 berth in the 2022 Copa Libertadores. By having the greater number of points in the aggregate table, Emelec played the second leg at home.

5 December 2021
20:00 UTC−5

Independiente del Valle	3–1	Emelec
Sornoza 22', 53' (pen.); Bauman 74'	Report	S. Rodríguez 90+9' (pen.)

Estadio Banco Guayaquil, Sangolquí
Referee: Luis Quiroz

12 December 2021
19:00 UTC−5

Emelec	1–1	Independiente del Valle
Arroyo 45+8'	Report	Schunke 8'

Estadio George Capwell, Guayaquil
Referee: Augusto Aragón

Independiente del Valle won 4–2 on aggregate.

== Aggregate table ==
Pos	Team	Pld	W	D	L	GF	GA	GD	Pts	Qualification or relegation
1	Emelec	30	19	7	4	59	29	+30	64	Qualification for Copa Libertadores group stage
2	Independiente del Valle (C)	30	18	7	5	56	27	+29	61	Qualification for Copa Libertadores group stage
3	Universidad Católica	30	15	9	6	54	33	+21	54	Qualification for Copa Libertadores second stage
4	Barcelona	30	15	6	9	51	33	+18	51	Qualification for Copa Libertadores first stage
5	9 de Octubre	30	15	5	10	47	38	+9	50	Qualification for Copa Sudamericana first stage (Note: Since the 2021 Copa Ecuador was cancelled due to the effects of the COVID-19 pandemic in Ecuador, the spot awarded to its champions (Copa Sudamericana first stage) was passed over to the aggregate table fourth best-placed team not qualified for the Copa Libertadores.)
6	LDU Quito	30	12	12	6	49	41	+8	48	Qualification for Copa Sudamericana first stage
7	Mushuc Runa	30	11	8	11	41	42	−1	41	Qualification for Copa Sudamericana first stage
8	Delfín	30	10	10	10	44	45	−1	40	Qualification for Copa Sudamericana first stage
9	Aucas	30	10	9	11	47	43	+4	39	
10	Macará	30	9	9	12	35	46	−11	36	
11	Técnico Universitario	30	8	11	11	24	26	−2	35	
12	Deportivo Cuenca	30	8	8	14	39	42	−3	32	
13	Orense	30	7	10	13	28	37	−9	31	
14	Guayaquil City	30	8	6	16	27	48	−21	30	
15	Manta (R)	30	6	10	14	29	46	−17	28	Relegation to Serie B
16	Olmedo (Note: Olmedo were deducted three points as punishment for failing to pay their creditors.) (R)	30	2	7	21	22	76	−54	10	Relegation to Serie B

Source: LigaPro
Rules for classification: 1) Points, 2) Goal difference, 3) Goals for, 4) Away goals for, 5) Head-to-head record, 6) Drawing of lots.
(C) Champions; (R) Relegated

== Top scorers ==
Rank	Name	Club	Goals
1	(Argentina) Jonatan Bauman	Mushuc Runa / Independiente del Valle	26
2	(Ecuador) Jhon Cifuente	Delfín	17
3	(Argentina) Lisandro Alzugaray	Universidad Católica	15
4	(Argentina) Diego Dorregaray	Deportivo Cuenca	14
5	(Panama) José Fajardo	9 de Octubre	12
5	(Argentina) Francisco Fydriszewski	Aucas	12
7	(Uruguay) Facundo Barceló	Emelec	10
7	(Ecuador) Jhonny Quiñónez	Aucas	10
7	(Uruguay) Sebastián Rodríguez	Emelec	10
7	(Ecuador) Joao Rojas	Emelec	10

Source: FEF
