= 2009 Campeonato Ecuatoriano de Fútbol Serie A =

Copa Credife Serie A
- Season: 2009
- Champions: Deportivo Quito (4th title)
- Relegated: LDU Portoviejo; Técnico Universitario
- 2010 Copa Libertadores: Deportivo Quito; Deportivo Cuenca; Emelec
- 2009 Copa Sudamericana: Emelec; LDU Quito
- Matches: 232
- Goals: 527 (2.27 per match)
- Top goalscorer: Claudio Bieler (22 goals)
- Biggest home win: Barcelona 5–0 LDU Portoviejo
- Biggest away win: LDU Portoviejo 0–4 LDU Quito
- Highest scoring: Emelec 5–1 ESPOLI; Olmedo 3–3 Macará; Técnico Universitario 3–3 Olmedo
- Longest unbeaten run: 17 matches: LDU Quito (May 16 – Sep 16)
- Highest attendance: 33,250 (Deportivo Quito v. Macará)
- Lowest attendance: 54 (Manta v. ESPOLI)
- Average attendance: 4,870

The 2009 Campeonato Ecuatoriano de Fútbol de la Serie A was the 51st season of the Serie A, Ecuador's premier football league. The season began on January 31 and ended on December 7. Deportivo Quito successfully defended their title for their fourth overall.

Owing to a change in sponsorship from Pilsener to Credife, the tournament will be called the Copa Credife Serie A for the next three years until 2011.

== Format ==
For 2009, a new format was introduced and approved by Ecuadorian Football Federation. The new tournament was divided into four stages, as opposed to the usual three. All matches were scheduled to be played on Sundays, but some were moved at the clubs' requests.

The First Stage was a double round-robin tournament in which the twelve teams played against each other teams twice: once at home and once away. At the end of the stage, the top-four teams with the most points qualified to the Third Stage; the top three earned bonus points (3, 2, & 1 respectively). The top-two teams also qualified to the 2009 Copa Sudamericana.

In the Second Stage, the teams were divided into two groups of six. Groups were formed by draw, but did not have no more than one team from each provincial organization (the exception being Pichincha). The teams played within their groups in a double round-robin tournament and in a local derby (Spanish: clásico). The derbies were played on the third and seventh match day of the stage.

Group 1
- Pichincha team 1
- Pichincha team 2
- Guayas team 1
- Manabí team 1
- Tungurahua team 1
- Azuay team or Chimborazo team

Group 2
- Pichincha team 3
- Pichincha team 4
- Guayas team 2
- Manabí team 2
- Tungurahua team 2
- Azuay team or Chimborazo team

Clásicos

- Pichincha team 1 vs. Pichincha team 3
- Pichincha team 2 vs. Pichincha team 4
- Guayas team 1 vs. Guayas team 2
- Manabí team 1 vs. Manabí team 2
- Tungurahua team 1 vs. Tungurahua team 2
- Azuay team vs. Chimborazo team

At the end of this stage, the two-top teams from each group qualified to the Third Stage; the top team in each group earned one bonus point for the Third Stage. The two teams with the fewest points in the First and Second Stage aggregate table were relegated to the Serie B for the next season.

In the Third Stage, the eight qualified teams were placed into two groups of four depending on their position on the aggregate table.

- Group 1: 1st, 4th, 5th, 8th
- Group 2: 2nd, 3rd, 6th, 7th

The top two teams from each group will advance to the Fourth Stage.

The Fourth Stage will consist of two head-to-head match-ups: one by the top-finisher of each group in the Third Stage, and the other by the runners-up. The match between the top finishers in the Third Stage will determine the national champion; the other will determine who finished third and fourth. The national champion, runner-up, and third-place finisher will each have a berth in the 2010 Copa Libertadores. The Ecuador 1 berth will go to the national champion, Ecuador 2 will go to the runner-up, and Ecuador 3 to the third-place finisher.

== Teams ==
Twelve teams competed in the 2009 Serie A season, ten of whom remained from the 2008 season. Deportivo Azogues and Universidad Católica were relegated last season to the Serie B after accumulating the fewest points in the First and Second Stage aggregate table. They were replaced by Manta and LDU Portoviejo, the 2008 Serie B winner and runner-up, respectively. This was Manta's second spell and second season in the Serie A, having previously played in the 2003 season. LDU Portoviejo were playing in their 22nd season in the league. Their last appearance was in 2001.

Locations of the 2009 Serie A teams

Team	Home city	Home ground	Manager
Barcelona	Guayaquil	Monumental Banco Pichincha	Juan Manuel Llop
Deportivo Cuenca	Cuenca	Alejandro Serrano Aguilar	Paúl Vélez
Deportivo Quito	Quito	Olímpico Atahualpa	Rubén Darío Insúa
El Nacional	Quito	Olímpico Atahualpa	Julio Asad
Emelec	Guayaquil	George Capwell	Gabriel Perrone
ESPOLI	Quito	La Cocha (in Latacunga)	Homero Valencia
LDU Portoviejo	Portoviejo	Reales Tamarindos	Oswaldo Morelli
LDU Quito	Quito	Casa Blanca	Jorge Fossati
Macará	Ambato	Bellavista	Víctor Marchesini
Manta	Manta	Jocay	Fabián Bustos
Olmedo	Riobamba	Olímpico de Riobamba	Héctor González
Técnico Universitario	Ambato	Bellavista	Jorge Célico

=== Managerial changes ===
Team	Outgoing manager	Manner of departure	Date of vacancy	Replaced by	Date of appointment	Position in table
Pre-season changes
Barcelona	Reinaldo Merlo	Sacked	December 9, 2008	Benito Floro	December 18, 2008	N/A
Deportivo Cuenca	Paúl Vélez	Replaced	December 14, 2008	Guillermo Duró	November 18, 2008	N/A
Deportivo Quito	Carlos Sevilla	Sacked	December 15, 2008	Rubén Insúa	December 18, 2008	N/A
LDU Quito	Edgardo Bauza	Resigned	December 22, 2008	Jorge Fossati	January 9, 2009	N/A
El Nacional	Jorge Célico	Sacked	January 28, 2009	Juan Carlos Burbano (interim)	January 29, 2009	N/A
First Stage changes
Técnico Universitario	Giovanni Mera	Sacked	March 13, 2009	Jorge Célico	March 30, 2009	12th
Macará	Mario Jacquet	Sacked	April 7, 2009	Víctor Marchesini	April 7, 2009	6th
Olmedo	Dragan Miranovic	Resigned	May 18, 2009	Héctor González (care-taker)	May 19, 2009	9th
Barcelona	Benito Floro	Sacked	June 1, 2009	Flavio Perlaza (interim)	June 1, 2009	10th
Manta	Carlos Pico	Resigned	July 6, 2009	Fabián Bustos	July 9, 2009	11th
El Nacional	Juan Carlos Burbano	Resigned	July 12, 2009	Julio Asad	July 16, 2009	6th
Barcelona	Flavio Perlaza	Replaced	June 18, 2009	Juan Manuel Llop	June 18, 2009	11th
Second Stage changes
ESPOLI	Paulo Massa	Resigned	?	Roberto Abruzzese	September 8, 2009	5th in B
Deportivo Cuenca	Guillermo Duró	Resigned	September 16, 2009	Paúl Vélez	September 17, 2009	3rd in A
Third Stage changes
ESPOLI	Roberto Abruzzese	Mutual	October 7, 2009	Homero Valencia	October 7, 2009	N/A

== First stage ==
The first stage ran from January 31 to July 12. The top-two teams qualified to the 2009 Copa Sudamericana. The top-four teams qualified to the Third Stage.

=== Standings ===
Pos	Team	Pld	W	D	L	GF	GA	GD	Pts	Qualification
1	Emelec	22	13	4	5	30	17	+13	43	Third Stage and the 2009 Copa Sudamericana First Stage
2	LDU Quito	22	12	6	4	44	20	+24	42	Third Stage and the 2009 Copa Sudamericana First Stage
3	Macará	22	10	4	8	28	26	+2	34	Third Stage
4	Olmedo	22	9	6	7	28	25	+3	33	Third Stage
5	ESPOLI	22	10	3	9	29	29	0	33	
6	El Nacional	22	8	5	9	24	21	+3	29	
7	Deportivo Quito	22	8	4	10	18	21	−3	28	
8	LDU Portoviejo	22	8	4	10	22	35	−13	28	
9	Barcelona	22	7	5	10	19	21	−2	26	
10	Deportivo Cuenca	22	8	2	12	25	31	−6	26	
11	Técnico Universitario	22	6	6	10	29	42	−13	24	
12	Manta	22	6	5	11	15	24	−9	23	

Rules for classification: 1) points; 2) goal difference; 3) number of goals scored.

=== Results ===
Home \ Away	BAR	CUE	QUI	NAC	EME	ESP	LDP	LDQ	MAC	MAN	OLM	TEC
Barcelona	—	2–1	0–0 (Note: The matches were played at Estadio 9 de Mayo in Machala.)	0–0	0–1	0–1	5–0	2–1	0–0	1–0	1–0	4–1
Deportivo Cuenca	1–0	—	0–1	1–0	0–1	0–1	2–0	1–0	0–1	2–1	2–1	3–2
Deportivo Quito	0–2	2–0	—	0–1	0–1	2–1	2–0	1–1	0–2	3–0	2–1	1–1
El Nacional	2–0	2–3	0–1	—	2–1	0–2	2–3	1–1	1–1	2–0	3–0	4–1
Emelec	0–0	3–2	2–0	2–0	—	5–1	0–1	1–1	1–0	2–0	0–1	2–2
ESPOLI	2–1	1–0	1–0	0–0	1–2	—	2–0	2–2 (Note: The match was played at Estadio Olímpico in Ibarra.)	3–1	0–0	1–3	0–2
LDU Portoviejo	1–0	2–2	1–0	0–1	1–2	2–1	—	2–1	1–1	0–1	1–2	1–0
LDU Quito	3–0	1–1	4–0	2–0	2–0	3–2	4–0	—	1–0	2–1	1–1	4–0
Macará	2–0	3–0	0–2	1–0	1–2	3–2	1–2	2–1	—	1–0	1–3	2–1
Manta	0–0	2–0	1–0	1–0	0–1	2–1	1–1	0–2	1–2	—	1–1	1–1
Olmedo	1–0	3–2	1–0	0–0	0–0	0–1	2–1	2–3	3–3	2–0	—	0–1
Técnico Universitario	4–1	2–1	1–1	1–3	2–1	1–3	2–2	1–4	2–0	0–2	1–1	—

Legend: Blue = home team win; Yellow = draw; Red = away team win.

== Second stage ==
The Second Stage began on July 19 and ended on October 3. The top-two teams from each group qualified to the Third Stage.

=== Group 1 ===
==== Standings ====
Pos	Team	Pld	W	D	L	GF	GA	GD	Pts	Qualification
1	LDU Quito	12	6	4	2	17	10	+7	22	Third Stage
2	Deportivo Cuenca	12	4	6	2	13	11	+2	18	Third Stage
3	El Nacional	12	4	3	5	17	9	+8	15	
4	Barcelona	12	3	6	3	14	16	−2	15	
5	Macará	12	2	6	4	11	12	−1	12	
6	LDU Portoviejo	12	3	2	7	8	20	−12	11	

Rules for classification: 1) points; 2) goal difference; 3) number of goals scored.

==== Results ====
Home \ Away	BAR	CUE	NAC	LDP	LDQ	MAC
Barcelona	—	1–1	1–1	2–0	1–1	3–1
Deportivo Cuenca	2–1	—	1–0	2–1	3–0	0–0
El Nacional	1–1	4–1	—	3–0	0–1	1–0
LDU Portoviejo	2–0	1–0	1–0	—	0–4	1–1
LDU Quito	4–0	2–2	1–0	2–0	—	1–1
Macará	1–2	0–0	1–1	3–0	0–2	—

Legend: Blue = home team win; Yellow = draw; Red = away team win.

=== Group 2 ===
==== Standings ====
Pos	Team	Pld	W	D	L	GF	GA	GD	Pts	Qualification
1	Deportivo Quito	12	7	2	3	13	8	+5	23	Third Stage
2	Manta	12	6	3	3	17	13	+4	21	Third Stage
3	Emelec	12	5	3	4	17	12	+5	18	
4	Olmedo	12	4	6	2	13	11	+2	18	
5	ESPOLI	12	4	1	7	13	20	−7	13	
6	Técnico Universitario	12	1	4	7	13	24	−11	7	

Rules for classification: 1) points; 2) goal difference; 3) number of goals scored.

==== Results ====
Home \ Away	QUI	EME	ESP	MAN	OLM	TEC
Deportivo Quito	—	1–0	1–0	2–0	1–1	1–2
Emelec	2–0	—	4–0	1–1	2–1	4–1
ESPOLI	0–1	2–0	—	2–0	1–2	2–2
Manta	2–0	2–0	2–1	—	0–1	3–1
Olmedo	0–2	2–0	1–0	1–1	—	0–0
Técnico Universitario	0–1	0–2	1–2	2–3	3–3	—

Legend: Blue = home team win; Yellow = draw; Red = away team win.

=== Inter-group clásicos ===
Home team	Results	Away team
El Clásico del Astillero
Emelec	2–2	Barcelona
Barcelona	0–0	Emelec
El Clásico Capitalino
LDU Quito	0–0	Deportivo Quito
Deportivo Quito	3–0	LDU Quito
El Clásico de las Fuerzas del Orden
El Nacional	4–0	ESPOLI
ESPOLI	3–2	El Nacional
El Clásico Manabita
LDU Portoviejo	0–0	Manta
Manta	3–2^{1}	LDU Portoviejo
El Clásico Ambateño
Técnico Universitario	0–2	Macará
Macará	1–1	Técnico Universitario
El Clásico del Austro
Deportivo Cuenca	0–0	Olmedo
Olmedo	1–1	Deportivo Cuenca

1. The match was played at Estadio Monumental Banco Pichincha in Guayaquil.
Colours: Blue=home team win; Yellow=draw; Red=away team win.

== Aggregate table ==
Pos	Team	Pld	W	D	L	GF	GA	GD	Pts	Qualification or relegation
1	LDU Quito	34	18	10	6	62	30	+32	64	Placed in Third Stage Group 1
2	Emelec	34	18	7	9	47	29	+18	61	Placed in Third Stage Group 2
3	Olmedo	34	13	12	9	41	36	+5	51	Placed in Third Stage Group 2
4	Deportivo Quito	34	15	6	13	31	28	+3	51	Placed in Third Stage Group 1
5	Macará	34	12	10	12	39	38	+1	46	Placed in Third Stage Group 1
6	ESPOLI	34	14	4	16	42	49	−7	46	Placed in Third Stage Group 2
7	El Nacional	34	12	8	14	41	32	+9	44	Eliminated
8	Deportivo Cuenca	34	12	8	14	38	42	−4	44	Placed in Third Stage Group 2
9	Manta	34	12	8	14	32	37	−5	44	Placed in Third Stage Group 1
10	Barcelona	34	10	11	13	33	37	−4	41	Eliminated
11	LDU Portoviejo	34	11	6	17	30	55	−25	39	Relegation to Serie B
12	Técnico Universitario	34	7	9	18	42	65	−23	30	Relegation to Serie B

Rules for classification: 1) points; 2) goal difference; 3) number of goals scored.

== Third stage ==
The Third Stage began on October 16 and is scheduled to end on November 22. The winners of each group will advance to the Fourth Stage to contest the national title. Both teams will have earned a berth to the 2010 Copa Libertadores and enter in the Second Stage of the competition (their exact berths will be determined in the Fourth Stage). The group runners-up will also advance to the Fourth Stage to contest the third-place match.

=== Group 1 ===
==== Standings ====
Pos	Team	Pld	W	D	L	GF	GA	GD	Pts	Qualification
1	Deportivo Quito	6	4	2	0	8	0	+8	15 (Note: Includes bonus points earned in earlier stages: LDU Quito (3 points), Deportivo Quito and Macará (1 point each).)	Championship Playoff and the 2010 Copa Libertadores Second Stage
2	LDU Quito	6	1	3	2	4	2	+2	9	Third-Place Playoff
3	Macará	6	1	3	2	2	3	−1	7	Eliminated
4	Manta	6	1	2	3	1	10	−9	5	Eliminated

Rules for classification: 1) points; 2) goal difference; 3) number of goals scored.

==== Results ====
Home \ Away	QUI	LDQ	MAC	MAN
Deportivo Quito	—	0–0	2–0	4–0
LDU Quito	0–1	—	0–0	4–0
Macará	0–1	0–0	—	0–0
Manta	0–0	1–0	0–2	—

Legend: Blue = home team win; Yellow = draw; Red = away team win.

=== Group 2 ===
==== Standings ====
Pos	Team	Pld	W	D	L	GF	GA	GD	Pts	Qualification
1	Deportivo Cuenca	6	5	1	0	8	3	+5	16	Championship Playoff and the 2010 Copa Libertadores Second Stage
2	Emelec	6	1	3	2	3	6	−3	10 (Note: Includes bonus points earned in earlier stages: Emelec (3 points).)	Third-Place Playoff
3	Olmedo	6	2	1	3	8	8	0	7	Eliminated
4	ESPOLI	6	0	3	3	3	5	−2	3	Eliminated

Rules for classification: 1) points; 2) goal difference; 3) number of goals scored.

==== Results ====
Home \ Away	CUE	EME	ESP	OLM
Deportivo Cuenca	—	1–1	1–0	2–1
Emelec	0–1	—	1–1	2–1
ESPOLI	0–1	0–0	—	2–3
Olmedo	1–2	2–0	0–0	—

Legend: Blue = home team win; Yellow = draw; Red = away team win.

== Fourth stage ==
The Fourth Stage will consists of two playoffs. The legs of the playoffs will be played on November 29 and December 7.

=== Third-place playoff ===
The third-place playoff will be contested between the runners-up of each Third Stage group for a berth in the 2010 Copa Libertadores First Stage.

November 29, 2009
12:00 (UTC−05:00)

Emelec	1–0	LDU Quito
Peirone 11'	Report

Estadio George Capwell, Guayaquil
Attendance: 6,352
Referee: Omar Ponce

December 7, 2009
16:00 (UTC−05:00)

LDU Quito	0–1	Emelec
	Report	Rojas 83'

Estadio Casa Blanca, Quito
Attendance: 17,106
Referee: Miguel Hidalgo

=== Championship playoff ===
The championship playoff will be contested between the winners of each Third Stage group for the national title. Both teams will have already earned a berth in the 2010 Copa Libertadores Second Stage, but their exact berth will be determined here.

November 29, 2009
12:00 (UTC−05:00)

Deportivo Cuenca	1–1	Deportivo Quito
Ianiero 76'	Report	Pirchio 59'

Estadio Alejandro Serrano Aguilar, Cuenca
Attendance: 20,696
Referee: Tomás Alarcón

December 5, 2009
15:45 (UTC−05:00)

Deportivo Quito	3–2	Deportivo Cuenca
Mina 69'; Arroyo 73', 87'	Report	Preciado 80'; Villalba 83'

Estadio Olímpico Atahualpa, Quito
Attendance: 33,245
Referee: Carlos Vera

Copa Credife Serie A
2009 champion

4th title

== Top goalscorers ==
Pos	Player	Nationality	Club	Goals
1	Claudio Bieler	Argentine	LDU Quito	22
2	Gabriel Fernández	Argentine	Macará	16
2	Omar Guerra	Colombian	Técnico Universitario	16
4	Édison Preciado	Ecuadorian	Deportivo Cuenca	13
5	Iván Borghello	Argentine	Deportivo Quito	11
5	Fábio Renato	Brazilian	ESPOLI	11
7	Michael Arroyo	Ecuadorian	Deportivo Quito	10
7	Cristian Suárez	Ecuadorian	Olmedo	10
9	Luis Miguel Garcés	Ecuadorian	Macará	9
9	David Quiroz	Ecuadorian	Emelec	9
9	Rodrigo Teixeira	Brazilian	Deportivo Cuenca	9

== Awards ==
The awards were selected by the Asociación Ecuatoriana de Radiodifusión.

- Best player: Marcelo Elizaga (Emelec)
- Best goalkeeper: Marcelo Elizaga (Emelec)
- Best defender: Marcelo Fleitas (Emelec)
- Best midfielder: Giancarlo Ramos (Deportivo Cuenca)
- Best striker: Claudio Bieler (LDU Quito)
- Best young player: Joao Rojas (Emelec)
- Best manager: Paúl Vélez (Deportivo Cuenca)
- Best Ecuadorian playing abroad: Antonio Valencia (Manchester United)
- Best referee: Carlos Vera

== Statistics ==
Statistics were compiled by Quito-based newspaper El Comercio.

Scoring
- Total goals: 527
  - Average: 2.27 per game (lowest historic average)
- Total goalscorers: 160
- Top-scorer: Claudio Bieler (22 for LDU Quito)
- First goal: Gabriel Méndez (Olmedo) against José Francisco Cevallos (LDU Quito)
- Last goal: Joao Rojas (Emelec) against José Francisco Cevallos (LDU Quito)
- Total own goals: 2

Goalkeeping
- Total goalkeepers: 32
  - Field players turned goalkeeper: 2 (Patricio Urrutia, LDU Quito; Claudio Rojas, Tecnico Universitario)
- Most scored upon: Wilmar Zumba (Macara; 38 goals)
- Least scored upon: Carlos Santos (Manta; 0 in three games)
- Best average: Alexander Domínguez (11 goals in 24 matches)
- Most penalties stopped: Cristian Mora (El Nacional; 3 stopped)

Players and Manager
- Total players: 393
- Team with the most used: LDU Quito (39 players)
- Team with the least used: Olmedo, Deportivo Cuenca, LDU Portoviejo, Macara (30 each)
- Most capped player(s): Luis Checa (Deportivo Quito) and Édison Preciado (Deportivo Cuenca) (41 games each)
- Total managers: 24
- Most changes: 3 (El Nacional, ESPOLI, Macara, Tecnico Universitario)

Attendance
- Total: 1,129,811
  - Average: 4,870 per match
- Highest attendance: Deportivo Quito v. Macara (33,250)
- Lowest attendance: Manta v. ESPOLI (54)
- Highest attendance by date: match day 13 (47,109)
- Lowest attendance by date: match day 30 (8,925)

== See also ==
- 2009 in Ecuadorian football
- 2009 Copa Libertadores
- 2009 Copa Sudamericana
- 2009 Recopa Sudamericana
