= 2013 Campeonato Ecuatoriano de Fútbol Serie A =

Copa Pilsener Serie A
- Season: 2013
- Champions: Emelec (11th title)
- Relegated: Macará; Deportivo Quevedo
- 2014 Copa Libertadores: Emelec; Independiente del Valle; Deportivo Quito
- 2014 Copa Sudamericana: Emelec; Independiente del Valle; Universidad Católica; Barcelona
- Matches: 264
- Goals: 645 (2.44 per match)
- Top goalscorer: Federico Nieto (29 goals)
- Biggest home win: Emelec 7–0 Universidad Católica (October 20)
- Biggest away win: Universidad Católica 0–4 Emelec (January 30); Macará 1–5 Deportivo Cuenca (April 27); Macará 1–5 Independiente del Valle (May 25); Macará 0–4 Emelec (October 27)
- Highest scoring: Barcelona 6–2 Universidad Católica (May 8)
- Longest winning run: Emelec — 8 matches (January 27–March 29)
- Longest unbeaten run: Emelec — 12 matches (September 18–December 8)
- Longest winless run: LDU Loja — 16 matches (February 22–June 23)
- Longest losing run: El Nacional — 6 matches (February 2–March 9); Macará — 6 matches (April 5–May 8)

The 2013 Campeonato Ecuatoriano de Fútbol de la Serie A (officially known as the Copa Pilsener Serie A for sponsorship reasons) was the 55th season of the Serie A, Ecuador's premier football league. Barcelona was the defending champion.

== Format ==
On the night of January 8, 2013, the Ecuadorian Football Federation determined that the format for 2013 would be the same as the previous season.

== Teams ==
Twelve teams will compete in the 2013 Serie A season, ten of whom remain from the previous season. Técnico Universitario and Olmedo were relegated last season after accumulating the fewest points in the 2012 season aggregate table. They will be replaced by Universidad Católica and Deportivo Quevedo, the 2012 Serie B winner and runner-up, respectively. Both teams are making returns to the Serie A. Universidad Católica is returning after two seasons, while Deportivo Quevedo is returning after seven.

Locations of the 2012 Serie A teams.

Team	Home city	Home ground	Manager	Captain
Barcelona	Guayaquil	Monumental Banco Pichincha	Luis Soler	Matías Oyola
Deportivo Cuenca	Cuenca	Alejandro Serrano Aguilar	Fabián Frías	Mariano Mina
Deportivo Quevedo	Quevedo	7 de Octubre	José Mora	Jhon García
Deportivo Quito	Quito	Olímpico Atahualpa	Rubén Darío Insúa	Jorge Guagua
El Nacional	Quito	Olímpico Atahualpa	Carlos Sevilla	Marwin Pita
Emelec	Guayaquil	George Capwell	Gustavo Quinteros	Pedro Quiñónez
Independiente del Valle	Sangolquí	Rumiñahui	Pablo Repetto	Henry León
LDU Loja	Loja	Federativo Reina del Cisne	Álex Aguinaga	Pedro Larrea
LDU Quito	Quito	Casa Blanca	Edgardo Bauza	Norberto Araujo
Macará	Ambato	Bellavista	Christian Gómez	Cristian Mora
Manta	Manta	Jocay	Fabián Bustos	Rolando Ramírez
Universidad Católica	Quito	Olímpico Atahualpa	Jorge Célico	Facundo Martínez

=== Managerial changes ===
Team	Outgoing manager	Manner of departure	Date of vacancy	Replaced by	Date of appointment	Position in table
Pre-season changes
Deportivo Cuenca	Guillermo Duró	Replaced	December 2, 2012	Guillermo Rivarola	December 19, 2012	N/A
Manta	Armando Osma	Replaced	December 2, 2012	Edwin Cózar	December 18, 2012	N/A
First Stage changes
El Nacional	Orlando Narváez (Note: Interim manager.)	Replaced	January 29, 2013	Manuel Tomé	January 29, 2013	2nd
El Nacional	Manuel Tomé	Sacked	March 5, 2013	Orlando Narváez	March 5, 2013	10th
El Nacional	Orlando Narváez	Replaced	March 10, 2013	Carlos Sevilla	March 10, 2013	12th
Deportivo Cuenca	Guillermo Rivarola	Resigned	April 22, 2013	Fabián Frías	April 22, 2013	12th
Macará	Fabián Bustos	Resigned	April 28, 2013	Armando Ósma	April 29, 2013	12th
LDU Loja	Paúl Vélez	Resigned	May 18, 2013	Juan Carlos Pérez	May 18, 2013	11th
Inter-stage changes
LDU Loja	Juan Carlos Pérez	Replaced	June 29, 2013	Álex Aguinaga	June 29, 2013	N/A
Manta	Edwin Cózar	Resigned	June 30, 2013	Fabián Bustos	July 1, 2013	N/A
Second Stage changes
Deportivo Quevedo	Raúl Duarte	Resigned	July 21, 2013	Juan Urquiza	July 23, 2013	12th
Barcelona	Gustavo Costas	Resigned	August 10, 2013	Luis Soler	August 12, 2013	10th
Deportivo Quevedo	Juan Urquiza	Resigned	September 25, 2013	José Mora	September 25, 2013	12th
Macará	Armando Ósma	Resigned	October 22, 2013	Óscar Pacheco	October 23, 2013	12th
Macará	Óscar Pacheco	Resigned	November 8, 2013	Christian Gómez	November 8, 2013	12th

== First stage ==
The first stage (Spanish: Primera Etapa) began on January 25 and ended on June 30.

=== Standings ===
Pos	Team	Pld	W	D	L	GF	GA	GD	Pts	Qualification
1	Emelec	22	14	3	5	28	17	+11	45	2014 Copa Libertadores Second Stage and 2014 Copa Sudamericana First Stage
2	LDU Quito	22	12	5	5	26	19	+7	41	
3	Independiente del Valle	22	12	3	7	37	25	+12	39	
4	Deportivo Quito	22	10	8	4	41	24	+17	38	
5	Barcelona	22	11	5	6	33	19	+14	38	
6	Universidad Católica	22	9	6	7	34	35	−1	33	
7	El Nacional	22	8	2	12	29	33	−4	26	
8	Deportivo Cuenca	22	6	7	9	29	36	−7	25	
9	Deportivo Quevedo	22	6	5	11	26	34	−8	23	
10	Manta	22	5	7	10	26	33	−7	22	
11	LDU Loja	22	3	8	11	21	33	−12	17	
12	Macará	22	3	7	12	14	36	−22	16	

=== Results ===
Home \ Away	BAR	CUE	QUE	QUI	NAC	EME	IDV	LDL	LDQ	MAC	MAN	CAT
Barcelona	—	4–0	2–0	1–0	1–0	2–0	2–5	3–1	3–0	1–0	0–0	6–2
Deportivo Cuenca	2–0	—	1–1	2–2	1–1	0–1	2–1	1–1	0–0	2–1	0–2	1–2
Deportivo Quevedo	1–1	0–0	—	4–3	1–1	0–1	1–2	2–1	0–0	2–1	3–0	1–3
Deportivo Quito	1–0	5–1	4–1	—	3–1	3–0	0–2	2–0	2–1	0–0	3–0	2–2
El Nacional	2–1	3–1	1–2	1–2	—	2–1	3–0	2–1	0–1	3–1	2–1	1–2
Emelec	0–0	3–1	2–1	1–0	2–1	—	0–2	1–0	0–1	3–0	1–0	1–0
Independiente del Valle	1–1	2–1	2–1	0–0	2–1	1–1	—	2–1	1–2	3–0	3–0	1–0
LDU Loja	2–1	1–3	0–2	2–2	1–2	1–2	2–0	—	0–0	0–0	2–2	0–2
LDU Quito	1–0	0–2	3–1	1–3	1–0	1–2	2–1	1–1	—	1–0	2–0	2–1
Macará	0–0	1–5	1–0	2–2	2–1	0–0	1–5	0–1	0–3	—	1–0	1–1
Manta	1–2	3–1	3–2	0–0	4–0	1–2	3–1	1–1	1–1	1–1	—	2–2
Universidad Católica	0–2	2–2	2–0	2–2	2–1	0–4	1–0	2–2	1–2	2–1	3–1	—

Updated to match(es) played on June 30, 2013. Source:
Legend: Blue = home team win; Yellow = draw; Red = away team win.

== Second stage ==
The second stage (Spanish: Segunda Etapa) began on July 5 and will end on December 8.

=== Standings ===
Pos	Team	Pld	W	D	L	GF	GA	GD	Pts	Qualification
1	Emelec	22	12	7	3	39	13	+26	43	2014 Copa Libertadores Second Stage and 2014 Copa Sudamericana First Stage
2	Universidad Católica	22	11	5	6	34	29	+5	38	
3	Independiente del Valle	22	9	7	6	33	23	+10	34	
4	El Nacional	22	9	7	6	19	14	+5	34	
5	Deportivo Quito	22	9	6	7	21	26	−5	33	
6	Barcelona	22	7	9	6	21	24	−3	30	
7	LDU Loja	22	7	8	7	28	22	+6	29	
8	Manta	22	7	6	9	21	27	−6	27	
9	LDU Quito	22	5	10	7	22	22	0	25	
10	Deportivo Cuenca	22	4	10	8	29	32	−3	22	
11	Deportivo Quevedo	22	6	4	12	18	34	−16	22	
12	Macará	22	3	7	12	16	35	−19	16	

=== Results ===
Home \ Away	BAR	CUE	QUE	QUI	NAC	EME	IDV	LDL	LDQ	MAC	MAN	CAT
Barcelona	—	3–3	2–0	2–1	0–1	0–2	1–1	0–0	1–0	0–0	2–1	0–1
Deportivo Cuenca	0–0	—	3–0	6–1	0–0	0–0	1–3	1–0	0–3	2–0	1–1	2–2
Deportivo Quevedo	0–0	3–1	—	2–0	1–0	1–3	0–3	1–1	0–0	1–0	1–0	0–2
Deportivo Quito	1–2	1–1	2–1	—	0–0	2–0	1–1	2–0	0–0	3–0	1–0	2–0
El Nacional	0–1	2–2	2–0	0–1	—	0–2	1–0	1–1	1–0	2–0	2–1	2–1
Emelec	0–0	2–0	3–1	3–0	0–2	—	1–0	0–0	0–0	2–1	4–1	7–0
Independiente del Valle	3–0	2–1	3–1	0–1	0–0	2–2	—	1–0	1–0	3–0	1–1	2–2
LDU Loja	3–1	2–1	1–0	4–0	1–1	0–2	2–1	—	1–1	4–1	3–0	0–1
LDU Quito	2–2	2–1	3–1	1–1	0–1	1–1	2–2	2–1	—	1–1	0–1	0–3
Macará	2–2	1–1	2–0	0–1	1–1	0–4	2–0	1–1	1–3	—	2–1	0–1
Manta	0–1	1–1	1–1	3–0	1–0	0–0	2–1	2–1	1–1	1–0	—	2–1
Universidad Católica	3–1	3–1	2–3	0–0	1–0	2–1	2–3	2–2	1–0	1–1	3–0	—

Updated to match(es) played on December 8, 2013. Source:
Legend: Blue = home team win; Yellow = draw; Red = away team win.

== Aggregate table ==
Pos	Team	Pld	W	D	L	GF	GA	GD	Pts	Qualification or relegation
1	Emelec	44	26	10	8	67	30	+37	88	2014 Copa Libertadores Second Stage and 2014 Copa Sudamericana First Stage
2	Independiente del Valle	44	21	10	13	70	48	+22	73	2014 Copa Libertadores Second Stage and 2014 Copa Sudamericana First Stage
3	Deportivo Quito	44	19	14	11	62	50	+12	71	2014 Copa Libertadores First Stage
4	Universidad Católica	44	20	11	13	68	64	+4	71	2014 Copa Sudamericana First Stage
5	Barcelona	44	18	14	12	54	43	+11	68	2014 Copa Sudamericana First Stage
6	LDU Quito	44	17	15	12	48	41	+7	66	
7	El Nacional	44	17	9	18	48	47	+1	60	
8	Manta	44	12	13	19	47	60	−13	49	
9	Deportivo Cuenca	44	10	17	17	58	68	−10	47	
10	LDU Loja	44	10	16	18	49	55	−6	46	
11	Deportivo Quevedo	44	12	9	23	44	68	−24	45	Relegation to the Serie B
12	Macará	44	6	14	24	30	71	−41	32	Relegation to the Serie B

== Third stage ==
The Third Stage (Spanish: Tercera Etapa) was not played as Emelec won both the first stage and second stage, and were crowned champions automatically. They earned the Ecuador 1 berth in the 2014 Copa Libertadores and the Ecuador 1 berth in the 2014 Copa Sudamericana.

== Top goalscorers ==
Rank	Player	Nationality	Club	Goals
1	Federico Nieto	Argentine	Deportivo Quito	28
2	Federico Laurito	Argentine	Universidad Católica	25
3	Andrés Ríos	Argentine	Deportivo Cuenca	21
4	Junior Sornoza	Ecuadorian	Independiente del Valle	19
5	Christian Márquez	Ecuadorian	Manta	15
6	Daniel Angulo	Ecuadorian	Independiente del Valle	12
6	Alex Colón	Ecuadorian	Deportivo Quito	12
6	Ariel Nahuelpan	Argentine	Barcelona	12
9	Michael Arroyo	Ecuadorian	Barcelona	11
9	Marlon de Jesús	Ecuadorian	Emelec	11

Updated as of games played on December 8, 2013.

=== Hat tricks ===
Player	For	Against	Result	Date
(Ecuador) Christian Márquez	Manta	Independiente del Valle	3–1	January 26, 2013
(Ecuador) Junior Sornoza^{4}	Independiente del Valle	Macará	1–5	May 25, 2013
(Argentina) Federico Nieto	Deportivo Quito	Deportivo Quevedo	4–3	June 26, 2013
(Argentina) Andrés Ríos	Deportivo Cuenca	Deportivo Quito	6–1	August 16, 2013

- ^{4} Player scored 4 goals.
