= Daniel Mina =

Ecuadorian footballer (born 1980)

Personal information
- Full name: Daniel Nevil Mina Arisola
- Date of birth: December 9, 1980 (age 45)
- Place of birth: Santa Ana, Ecuador
- Position: Midfielder

Team information
- Current team: Barcelona

Youth career
- 1999–2000: Barcelona

Senior career*
Years	Team	Apps	(Gls)
1999–2001	Barcelona	57	(?)
2002	Olmedo	23	(?)
2003	Barcelona	16	(?)
2004	Audaz Octubrino	2	(?)
2004–2005	Barcelona	12	(?)
2006	Macará	17	(?)
2007	Deportivo Cuenca	7	(?)
2008	Técnico Universitario	30	(?)
2009	Deportivo Quito	24	(?)
2010	Macará	24	(0)
2011–	Barcelona	0	(0)
- * Club domestic league appearances and goals

Daniel Nevil Mina Arisola (born December 9, 1980) is an Ecuadorian football midfielder currently playing for Barcelona.
