= Osvaldo Hobecker =

Paraguayan footballer (born 1984)

Personal information
- Full name: Osvaldo Hobecker García
- Date of birth: 23 March 1984 (age 42)
- Place of birth: Juan Emilio O'Leary, Paraguay
- Height: 1.69 m (5 ft 7 in)
- Position: Winger

Youth career
- 2001–2004: Cerro Porteño

Senior career*
Years	Team	Apps	(Gls)
2004–2005	Cerro Porteño	24	(3)
2005–2006	12 de Octubre	65	(7)
2007–2008	Cerro Porteño	49	(5)
2009–2014	Rubio Ñu	138	(33)
2011	→ Guaraní (loan)	16	(2)
2012	→ Olimpia (loan)	48	(6)
2014	→ LDU Loja (loan)	6	(0)
2015	Sportivo San Lorenzo	9	(1)
2015–2016	Nacional Potosí	19	(1)
2016	General Díaz	6	(0)
2016–2017	Guaraní Antonio Franco	23	(3)
2017	Sportivo Trinidense	10	(0)

International career
2010–2012	Paraguay	2	(0)
- * Club domestic league appearances and goals

Osvaldo Hobecker (born 23 April 1984) is a Paraguayan retired footballer.

== Career ==
Hobecker started his youth career in Cerro Porteño and made his professional debut in 2004. After playing for Cerro Porteño during three seasons, he moved to Rubio Ñu in January 2009. He became a regular in the starting lineup and a key player.

On 4 February 2011, he has signed with the Paraguayan prominent Club Guaraní.

In January 2014, he joined Ecuadorian side Liga de Loja.

== International career ==
On 26 March 2010, Hobecker was first called to the Paraguayan football team for friendly against South Africa, because he constantly played well in Rubio Ñu. Hobecker made his national team debut in which he came on as a 65th-minute substitute for Rodrigo Rojas on 31 March 2010.
