= Boris Fiallos =

Ecuadorian footballer and manager (born 1974)

Personal information
- Full name: Boris Santiago Fiallos Tirado
- Date of birth: 16 March 1974 (age 52)
- Place of birth: Ambato, Ecuador
- Position: Defender

Senior career*
Years	Team	Apps	(Gls)
1999–2003	Macará	62	(2)
2003–2005	Tungurahua	33	(1)

Managerial career
- Macará (youth)
- 2010: Macará (interim)
- 2011–2015: Técnico Universitario (youth)
- 2012: Técnico Universitario (interim)
- 2015: Técnico Universitario
- 2016–2023: Macará (assistant)
- 2023: Macará
- * Club domestic league appearances and goals

Boris Santiago Fiallos Tirado (born 16 March 1974) is an Ecuadorian football manager and former player who played as a defender.

== Playing career ==
Born in Ambato, Fiallos played for hometown side Macará in the Serie A, suffering relegation in 2002. In the following year, he moved to Tungurahua of the Segunda Categoría, winning the title with the club in 2004. He was forced to retire in 2005 due to a knee injury.

== Managerial career ==
After retiring, Fiallos returned to Macará to become a manager of the youth categories. On 30 June 2010, he became an interim manager of the first team, after the dismissal of Carlos Sevilla.

Fiallos' spell in charge of Macará lasted one match (a 3–1 loss to LDU Quito) before the appointment of Víctor Riggio as manager. He later became a youth coach at cross-town rivals Técnico Universitario, being also an interim manager of the main squad in June 2012.

On 7 September 2015, Fiallos was named manager of Técnico Universitario until the end of the year, after the sacking of Óscar del Solar. In January 2016, he returned to Macará and joined Paúl Vélez's staff as an assistant.

Fiallos continued to work as an assistant of Macará in the following years, and was named manager of the club on 10 April 2023, replacing Marcelo Robledo. He led the club to the Serie B title at the end of the season, but left on a mutual agreement on 30 October.

== Honours ==
Tungurahua

- Segunda Categoría: 2004

Macará

- Ecuadorian Serie B: 2023
