= Édison Preciado =

Ecuadorian footballer (born 1986)

Personal information
- Full name: Édison Andres Preciado Bravo
- Date of birth: 18 April 1986 (age 40)
- Place of birth: Huaquillas, El Oro, Ecuador
- Height: 1.70 m (5 ft 7 in)
- Position: Forward

Team information
- Current team: Liga de Cuenca (Liga Deportiva de Cuenca)

Youth career
- 2001–2002: Audaz Octubrino
- 2003–2004: Deportivo Cuenca

Senior career*
Years	Team	Apps	(Gls)
2005–2009	Deportivo Cuenca	108	(24)
2007	→ Técnico Univ. (loan)	21	(12)
2010–2013	El Nacional	136	(31)
2013–2015	Atlético San Luis	31	(8)
2015	El Nacional	19	(3)
2016	Delfín	34	(5)
2017–2020	Deportivo Cuenca	88	(6)
2020	Gualaceo	?	(2)
2020–2021	Orense	9	(0)
2021–2022	Aviced FC		
2023	Liga De Cuenca		

International career
2010	Ecuador	2	(0)
- * Club domestic league appearances and goals as of 11:33, 26 December 2021 (UTC)

Édison Andres Preciado Bravo (born April 18, 1986) is an Ecuadorian footballer currently playing for Liga de Cuenca (Liga Deportiva de Cuenca).

== Club career ==
Preciado started his professional career at Audaz Octubrino but was soon sold to Deportivo Cuenca. He played 3 seasons with Cuenca and was soon noted for his goal scoring ability. However, his real success was shown in the 2009 season. After Cuenca qualified for the Copa Libertadores 2009, Preciado scored the only goal in a 1–0 home win against Boca Juniors. He signed for Ecuadorian giants El Nacional on January 6, 2009,

After two years in Mexican club Atletico San Luis, Preciado left the club in the summer 2015, as the parties couldn't agree on a contract extension. In July 2015, he returned to his former club El Nacional. In January 2016, Preciado moved to Delfín SC.

In January 2017, Preciado returned to Deportivo Cuenca where he played the next three years. In March 2020, he joined Gualaceo SC. In November 2020, Preciado joined Orense.

In the summer 2021, Preciado joined Aviced FC.
