= Marcos Pirchio =

Argentine footballer

Personal information
- Full name: Marcos Emiliano Pirchio
- Date of birth: January 25, 1986 (age 40)
- Place of birth: Casilda, Argentina
- Height: 1.81 m (5 ft 11 in)
- Position: Striker

Team information
- Current team: Royal Pari

Senior career*
Years	Team	Apps	(Gls)
2007–2008	Estudiantes	15	(0)
2008–2009	Olimpo	28	(9)
2009–2010	Deportivo Quito	30	(7)
2010	Unión	10	(2)
2011	Everton	10	(3)
2011–2012	Gimnasia y Esgrima	22	(5)
2012–2013	Macará	18	(6)
2013	Colorado Rapids	2	(0)
2013–2014	Macará	9	(1)
2014	Sanna Khanh Hoa	-	(-)
2014–2015	Guaraní Antonio Franco	6	(0)
2015–2016	All Boys	32	(5)
2016	Wilstermann	33	(6)
2017	Ayacucho FC	18	(2)
2018–	Royal Pari	10	(1)
- * Club domestic league appearances and goals as of 11 May 2015

Marcos Emiliano Pirchio (January 25, 1986) is an Argentine footballer who plays for Royal Pari of the Bolivian Primera División in Bolivia. He plays as a striker or a deep lying centre forward.

== Career ==
Pirchio hails from Casilda, hometown of another Estudiantes great, Marcelo Trobbiani. He made his top flight debut on May 7, 2006, against Gimnasia de La Plata. On September 5, 2007, Pirchio scored his first competitive goal for Estudiantes in a Copa Sudamericana fixture against Club Atlético Lanús.

In 2008, he transferred to Olimpo de Bahía Blanca, where he played until July 2009. Subsequently, he moved to Ecuador and signed for Deportivo Quito. He returned to Argentina subsequently, joining second division side Unión de Santa Fe.
