= Miguel Rondelli =

Argentine football manager

Personal information
- Full name: Miguel Ángel Rondelli
- Date of birth: 24 January 1978 (age 48)
- Place of birth: Buenos Aires, Argentina

Team information
- Current team: Melgar (manager)

Youth career
- Years: Team
- Vélez Sarsfield
- All Boys
- Lamadrid

Managerial career
- 2010–2017: Vélez Sarsfield (youth)
- 2018–2021: Universidad Católica del Ecuador (youth)
- 2021: Universidad Católica del Ecuador (interim)
- 2022: Universidad Católica del Ecuador
- 2023: Emelec
- 2024–2026: Cusco
- 2026–: Melgar

Miguel Ángel Rondelli (born 24 January 1978) is an Argentine football manager, currently in charge of Peruvian club Melgar.

== Career ==
Rondelli was born in Buenos Aires. After playing in the youth categories of Vélez Sarsfield, All Boys and Lamadrid, he retired at the age of just 16, and studied informatics before moving to coaching at the age of 25.

Rondelli subsequently worked in the youth sides of Vélez Sarsfield for twelve years, and moved abroad in 2018, joining Ecuadorian side Universidad Católica del Ecuador and being initially assigned as manager of the youth setup. In October 2021, he was named interim manager of the latter's main squad, along with Omar Andrade, after the departure of Santiago Escobar.

On 23 December 2021, Católica confirmed Rondelli as the first team manager for the 2022 season. He left the club on 17 November 2022, as his contract was due to expire.

On 29 November 2022, Rondelli replaced Ismael Rescalvo at the helm of Emelec, still in the Ecuadorian top tier. He left on a mutual agreement on 7 June of the following year, after the club finished 13th in the first stage of the 2023 Ecuadorian Serie A.

On 26 November 2023, Rondelli took over Cusco in the Peruvian Primera División. He qualified the club to two continental competitions in the following two seasons, before resigning on 28 March 2026.

Hours after resigning from Cusco, Melgar announced the signing of Rondelli as their manager.
