= Horacio Montemurro =

Argentine football manager

Personal information
- Full name: Horacio Antonio Montemurro
- Date of birth: 13 January 1962 (age 64)
- Place of birth: Buenos Aires, Argentina
- Position: Defender

Youth career
- Jorge Newbery
- Argentinos Juniors

Senior career*
Years	Team	Apps	(Gls)
1983–1984	Lamadrid		
1985–1987	Defensa y Justicia	37	(1)

Managerial career
- 2007: Argentinos Juniors (assistant)
- 2007–2008: Newell's Old Boys (assistant)
- 2009: Racing Club (assistant)
- 2010: Tigre (assistant)
- 2011–2012: Quilmes (assistant)
- 2012: San Lorenzo (assistant)
- 2013: Argentinos Juniors (assistant)
- 2014: Quilmes (assistant)
- 2014: Tristán Suárez (assistant)
- 2015: Arsenal de Sarandí (assistant)
- 2015–2016: El Porvenir
- 2017: Sportivo Italiano
- 2018–2019: Lamadrid
- 2020–2021: Delfín (assistant)
- 2020: Delfín (interim)
- 2021: Delfín
- 2022: Huancavilca
- 2023: Chacaritas
- * Club domestic league appearances and goals

Horacio Antonio Montemurro (born 13 January 1962) is an Argentine football manager and former player who played as a defender.

== Career ==
Born in Buenos Aires, Montemurro played for Jorge Newbery and Argentinos Juniors as a youth. He made his senior debut with Lamadrid, before moving to Defensa y Justicia in 1985.

After retiring, Montemurro worked as an assistant manager of Ricardo Caruso Lombardi at several teams in his home country before being named manager of El Porvenir on 19 December 2015. He was subsequently in charge of Sportivo Italiano and former team Lamadrid before moving to Ecuador in 2020, after being named assistant of Miguel Ángel Zahzú at Delfín.

On 3 December 2020, Montemurro was appointed interim manager of Delfín, after Zahzú's dismissal. He returned to his previous role after the appointment of Paúl Vélez, but was definitely appointed manager of the team on 4 August 2021, after Vélez was sacked.
