= Juan Carlos Pérez (footballer) =

Ecuadorian footballer and manager (born 1972)

Personal information
- Full name: Juan Carlos Pérez Palacios
- Date of birth: 9 January 1972 (age 54)
- Place of birth: Cuenca, Ecuador

Team information
- Current team: El Nacional (manager)

Youth career
- El Nacional

Senior career*
Years	Team	Apps	(Gls)
- El Nacional

Managerial career
- 2001–2002: LDU Loja
- 2002–2005: Deportivo Loja
- 2005–2011: El Nacional (youth)
- 2012–2014: LDU Loja (assistant)
- 2013: LDU Loja (interim)
- 2015–2016: Grecia
- 2016: Deportivo Calceta
- 2017: Atlético Kin
- 2018: Vargas Torres
- 2018: Audaz Octubrino
- 2019: Olmedo (reserves)
- 2019: Quiteños
- 2020: Cumbayá (assistant)
- 2021: Baldor Bermeo
- 2023: Leones del Norte
- 2024–2025: El Nacional (assistant)
- 2025: El Nacional (interim)
- 2025–: El Nacional
- * Club domestic league appearances and goals

Juan Carlos Pérez Palacios (born 9 January 1972) is an Ecuadorian professional football manager and former player. He is the current manager of El Nacional.

== Career ==
Born in Cuenca, Pérez made his first team debut with El Nacional at the age of 17, but would later retire and move to Argentina, where he obtained his managerial license. He led Segunda Categoría sides LDU Loja and Deportivo Loja before returning to El Nacional in 2005, as a manager of the youth sides.

Pérez returned to LDU Loja in 2012, as an assistant manager and director of the youth sides. In May of the following year, he was named interim manager after Paúl Vélez left, and remained in charge for more than one month before the appointment of Álex Aguinaga.

Pérez returned to managerial duties in 2015 with Grecia, and worked at lower league sides Deportivo Calceta, Atlético Kin, Vargas Torres and Audaz Octubrino. During the 2019 season, he was in charge of Olmedo's reserve team before joining the affiliate side of Deportivo Quito, Quiteños.

In 2020, Pérez was an assistant of Luis Espinel at Cumbayá, before being appointed manager of Baldor Bermeo in the following year. He was named manager of Leones del Norte ahead of the 2023 season, before returning to El Nacional in March 2024, as an assistant of the first team.

In June 2025, Pérez was appointed interim manager of El Nacional, after Omar Asad resigned. On 15 July, he was confirmed as manager of the club for the remainder of the year.
