= L.D.U. Loja =

Ecuadorian football club

Coordinates: 4°0′4″S 79°11′47″W

Liga de Loja
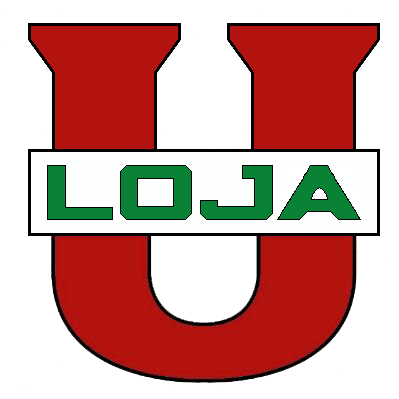
- Full name: Liga Deportiva Universitaria de Loja
- Nickname: La Garra del Oso (The Bear Claw)
- Founded: October 23, 1987
- Dissolved: 15 June 2022
- Ground: Estadio Federativo Reina del Cisne
- Capacity: 15,000
- Chairman: Franklin Moya
- Manager: Flavio Robatto
- League: Serie B
- 2013: 10th
Home colours	Away colours

Liga Deportiva Universitaria de Loja was a professional association football team from the city of Loja, Ecuador. They played in the Serie A, the highest level of the Ecuadorian professional football league. In the First Stage of the 2012 season, the team qualified for the first time to an international tournament, the 2012 Copa Sudamericana.

== History ==
Liga de Loja, began of the National University of Loja as a professional club in 1979. It has been the only football team from Loja that has been in the Serie A of Ecuadorian football and winning numerous championships locally. Its biggest fan groups are called: White Fury, The 12 South, The Band of the Black, Bear Claw, and Fan of Flags among the major. It was in the 1989 Loja league with players like the "Pavito" Orellana, Murillo, the "Tocho" Paz in the arch, among others, along with its reinforcements, won the zonal promotion to the Serie B, and so for the first time a team lojano brings the spectacle of professional football to the Estadio Federativo Reina del Cisne.

With a leadership group, friends and partner that contributed to achieving long-awaited by Loja, in this group was chaired by Mr. Vicente Gahona, were also: Eng Telmo Castro, Mr. Marco Quito, Mr. José Trelles, Mr. Byron Díaz. Dr. Alfonso Mendieta, among others. In 2003, history repeats itself, after two consecutive years of arriving in the final stages for classification and not have made it on goal differential in the second year, the leadership headed by Dr. Max González, and Dr. Luis Castillo president of the football committee, was unable to consolidate a group of experienced players with the case of the "Cocoa" Pazmiño, Wilman Buele and supported by young individuals as the "Gato" Gonzaga, Diego Feijoó, is returned to the Serie B Ecuadorian football championship, this time managing to further the Category II championship after beating team LDU Portoviejo in the Loja, to relive the illusion of an entire region that longed for the teams return to top flight.

== Stadium ==
The Estadio Federativo Reina del Cisne, is a multi-purpose stadium. It is located on Avenida Emiliano Ortega and Lourdes in the city of Loja. It was inaugurated on September 7, 1980, is used mostly for playing football and play at home there Liga de Loja, team Serie A Ecuadorian football. Its capacity is 14,935 spectators.

The stadium plays an important role in local football, as clubs like Liga de Loja Loja, Buffalos, Liga Deportiva Bernardina, City of Loja, Macas Automotive, New Horizons, Technical University of Loja, JVC Football Club, Football Club Loja, Borussia and The Thebaid made and / or make the local sports scene.

== Uniform ==
- Uniform main: White shirts, white shorts and white socks.
- Uniforms alternative: Black shirt, black shorts and black socks.

== Honors ==
- Serie B
  - Champions (1): 2010

== Out to loan ==
Note: Flags indicate national team as defined under FIFA eligibility rules; some limited exceptions apply. Players may hold more than one non-FIFA nationality.

No.	Pos.	Nation	Player

== Managers ==
- (Ecuador) Carlos Calderon (April 17, 2007 – June 30, 2008)
- (Argentina) Jorge Habegger (May 2, 2011 – Jan 5, 2012)
- (Ecuador) Paúl Vélez (Dec 5, 2011 – May 18, 2013)
- (Ecuador) Juan Carlos Pérez (interim) (May 18, 2013 – June 30, 2013)
- (Ecuador) Álex Aguinaga (July 1, 2013 – March 20, 2014)
- (Ecuador) Diego Ochoa (interim) (March 20, 2014–1?)
- (Ecuador) Geovanny Cumbicus (201?–)
