= Rubén Darío Insúa =

Argentine footballer and manager (born 1961)

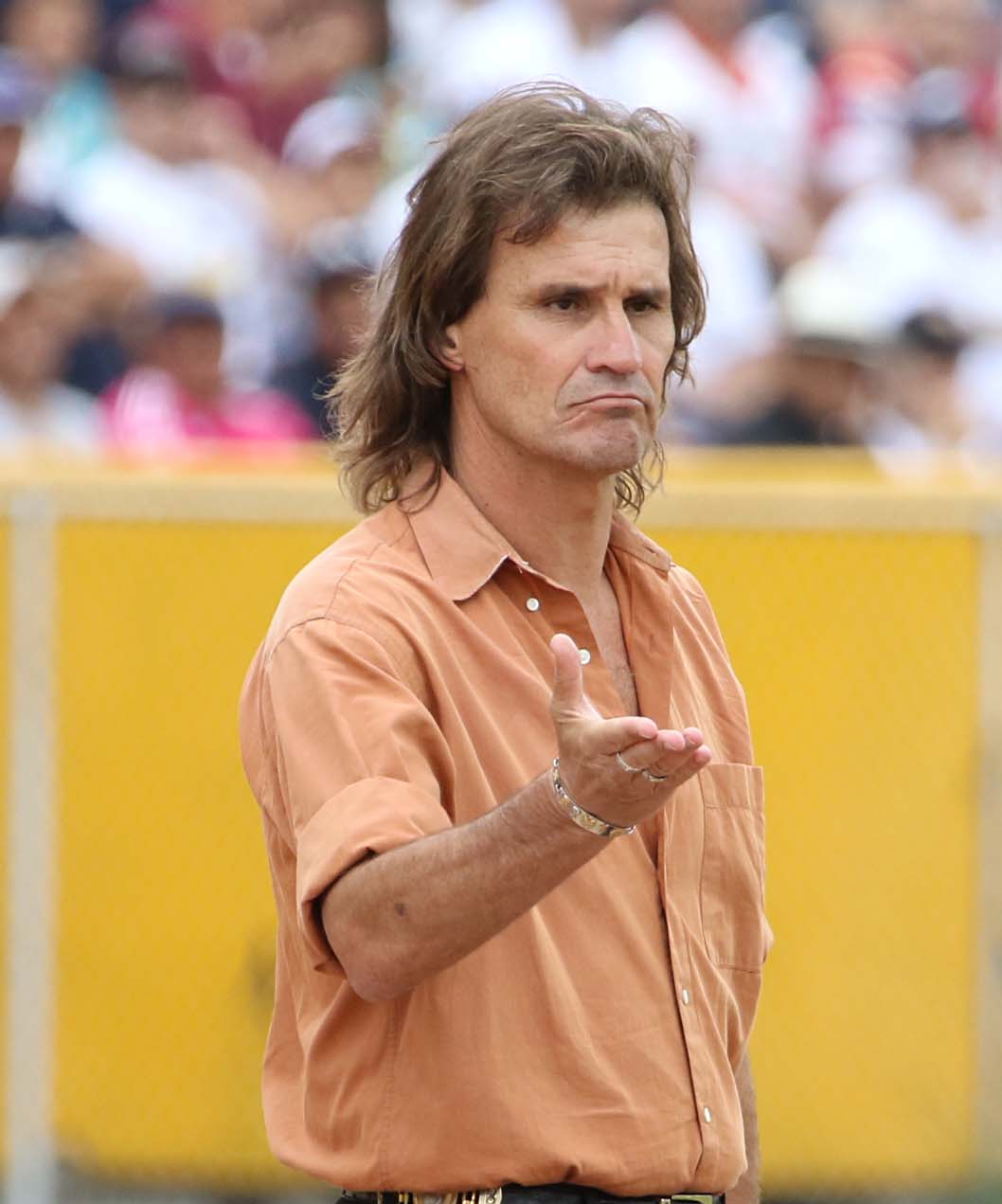
- Insúa in 2015

Personal information
- Full name: Rubén Darío Insúa Carballo
- Date of birth: 17 April 1961 (age 65)
- Place of birth: Buenos Aires, Argentina
- Height: 1.80 m (5 ft 11 in)
- Position: Attacking midfielder

Team information
- Current team: San Lorenzo (manager)

Senior career*
Years	Team	Apps	(Gls)
1978–1985	San Lorenzo	203	(38)
1985–1986	Las Palmas	10	(4)
1986–1988	Estudiantes LP	69	(11)
1988–1991	Independiente	87	(23)
1990–1994	Barcelona SC	80	(30)
1994–1995	Deportivo Cali		
1995–1996	Quilmes	7	(2)

International career
1983–1984	Argentina	5	(0)

Managerial career
- 1997–1999: Barcelona SC
- 1999: Ferro Carril Oeste
- 2000: Barcelona SC
- 2002–2003: San Lorenzo
- 2004: Barcelona SC
- 2005: Alianza Lima
- 2007: Wilstermann
- 2007–2008: Talleres
- 2009–2010: Deportivo Quito
- 2010–2011: Barcelona SC
- 2011–2012: Deportivo Cali
- 2012–2013: Deportivo Quito
- 2015: El Nacional
- 2016: Bolívar
- 2019–2020: LDU Portoviejo
- 2021: Binacional
- 2022–2024: San Lorenzo
- 2024–2026: Barracas Central
- 2026–: San Lorenzo
- * Club domestic league appearances and goals

Rubén Darío Insúa Carballo (born 17 April 1961) is an Argentine football manager and former player who played mainly as an attacking midfielder. He is the current manager of San Lorenzo.

Insúa represented the Argentina national team several times. During his playing career, he earned the nickname "el Poeta del Futbol" (the Poet of Football).

== Playing career ==
Insúa was born in Buenos Aires. He played most of his career in the Argentine top league. He was part of the Independiente team that won the 1988–89 Primera title. He also played for Barcelona in Ecuador and Deportivo Cali in Colombia, and had a spell with Spanish side UD Las Palmas.

== Style of play ==
As a player, Insúa was regarded as a swift midfielder with an excellent touch and a penchant for scoring from free kicks. These qualities earned him his nicknames "el Poeta del Gol" (the Goal Poet) and "el Poeta del Futbol" (the Football Poet). Although he was primarily an attacking midfielder, he was also capable of playing as a striker.

== Managerial career ==
Insúa coached for Ecuador's Barcelona to a national title in 1997, and the Copa Libertadores finals in 1998. He coached San Lorenzo de Almagro to the Copa Sudamericana 2002 title.

Insúa coached Ecuador's Deportivo Quito to the 2009 Campeonato Ecuatoriano de Fútbol Serie A title.

On 1 October 2010, Insúa reached a verbal agreement with Barcelona's president Eduardo Maruri to return and coach the club, which had won its last national title in 1997. On 25 March 2011, he was fired from Barcelona and replaced with Alex Aguinaga.

Insúa was Deportivo Cali's manager since approximately October 2011 until 4 March 2012.

He was the head coach of Argentine football club San Lorenzo de Almagro from end of 2023 to April 2024, when he was fired for poor results.

== Managerial statistics ==
As of match played 18 October 2026

Managerial record by team and tenure
Team	Nat	From	To	Record							
Team	Nat	From	To	G	W	D	L	GF	GA	GD	Win %
Barcelona SC	(Ecuador)	1 January 1997	31 December 1998	72	32	23	17	127	81	+46	44.44
Ferro Carril Oeste	(Argentina)	1 January 1999	31 December 1999	5	0	1	4	3	13	−10	0.00
Barcelona SC	(Ecuador)	1 January 2000	31 December 2000	44	15	15	14	60	55	+5	34.09
San Lorenzo	(Argentina)	1 July 2002	16 July 2003	47	20	12	15	75	62	+13	42.55
Barcelona SC	(Ecuador)	1 January 2004	31 December 2004	26	14	6	6	44	21	+23	53.85
Alianza Lima	(Peru)	1 January 2005	12 May 2005	17	4	8	5	27	23	+4	23.53
Jorge Wilstermann	(Bolivia)	1 January 2007	30 June 2007	22	10	5	7	29	23	+6	45.45
Talleres	(Argentina)	1 July 2007	1 March 2008	12	4	2	6	19	25	−6	33.33
Deportivo Quito	(Ecuador)	18 December 2008	12 August 2010	83	37	18	28	91	83	+8	44.58
Barcelona SC	(Ecuador)	2 October 2010	25 March 2011	21	5	9	7	19	24	−5	23.81
Deportivo Cali	(Colombia)	1 October 2011	5 March 2012	18	5	5	8	14	21	−7	27.78
Deportivo Quito	(Ecuador)	1 August 2012	31 December 2013	67	29	20	18	85	79	+6	43.28
El Nacional	(Ecuador)	29 May 2015	26 October 2015	19	7	3	9	18	25	−7	36.84
Bolívar	(Bolivia)	1 January 2016	25 April 2016	20	5	8	7	29	29	+0	25.00
LDU Portoviejo	(Ecuador)	4 February 2019	6 November 2020	61	19	23	19	79	74	+5	31.15
Binacional	(Peru)	7 April 2021	9 May 2021	3	0	1	2	2	5	−3	0.00
San Lorenzo	(Argentina)	18 May 2022	11 April 2024	99	37	42	20	95	73	+22	37.37
Barracas Central	(Argentina)	2 September 2024	14 June 2026	74	22	29	23	70	82	−12	29.73
San Lorenzo	(Argentina)	7 September 2026	present	5	2	1	2	4	7	−3	40.00
Total				715	267	231	217	890	805	+85	37.34

== Honours ==
=== Player ===
San Lorenzo

- Primera B: 1982

Independiente

- Primera División: 1988–89

Barcelona Sporting Club

- Serie A: 1991

=== Manager ===
Barcelona Sporting Club

- Serie A: 1997

San Lorenzo

- Copa Sudamericana: 2002

Deportivo Quito

- Serie A: 2009
