= Andrés García (footballer, born 1984) =

Spanish footballer and manager

Personal information
- Full name: Andrés García Soler
- Date of birth: 10 April 1984 (age 42)
- Place of birth: Algete, Spain
- Position: Defender

Team information
- Current team: Odi Sports Club (head coach)

Senior career*
Years	Team	Apps	(Gls)
- Cobeña B
2007	Cobeña	1	(0)
- Vicálvaro
- Collado Villalba
- El Casar
- Dehesa Luis II

Managerial career
- 2012–2014: Alcobendas (youth)
- 2013–2014: EMF Cobeña
- 2014–2015: Canillas (youth)
- 2015: El Casar
- 2015–2016: Getafe (youth)
- 2016–2017: Marchamalo
- 2017–2018: Getafe (youth)
- 2019-2020: Raufoss (youth)
- 2020–2021: Dalian Pro (youth)
- 2021–2022: Orense
- 2022: Raufoss
- 2023: Jönköpings Södra
- 2023: Logroñés
- 2024: Duhok (assistant)
- 2025: Guadalajara U23
- 2025–: Odi Sports Club
- * Club domestic league appearances and goals

Andrés García Soler (born 10 April 1984) is a Spanish football manager and former player who played as a defender. He is the current manager of Maldivian club Odi Sports Club.

== Career ==
Born in Algete, Community of Madrid, García was known as Karpin during his playing career, which consisted mainly of Tercera División and regional league football. In May 2007, he played 21 minutes in a Segunda División B match for CD Cobeña; the club subsequently folded. After retiring, he worked in the youth categories of Alcobendas CF before taking over EMF CD Cobeña (the replacement team of Cobeña in the city), and promoted the latter to the Segunda de Aficionados.

In 2014, García moved to China to work in the Real Madrid Foundation, but subsequently returned to his home country after being named manager of CD Canillas' Juvenil B side. On 14 July 2015, he was appointed at the helm of CD El Casar, but left in October to work as an assistant at Getafe CF's Juvenil A side.

On 27 May 2016, García was appointed manager of CD Marchamalo in the fourth division. He was sacked the following 4 April, and worked in the LaLiga Football Academy in Dubai and in the Spanish Soccer Institute in Tianjin before returning to Getafe in December 2017, now as manager of the Juvenil B team.

On 26 December 2018, García switched teams and countries again after being named under-19 manager of Norwegian side Raufoss IL. He left the club in November, and was named manager of the under-18 team of Dalian Professional in August 2020.

On 7 June 2021, García replaced sacked Patricio Lara as manager of Ecuadorian Serie A side Orense SC. On 12 August of the following year, he resigned.

On 1 November 2022, García returned to Raufoss, now as a first team manager. On 1 January 2023, however, he left the club after accepting an offer from Jönköpings Södra IF of the Swedish Superettan.

García left Jönköpings on a mutual agreement on 14 September 2023, and returned to his home country on 15 October, after being named manager of Primera Federación side SD Logroñés. He was dismissed from the latter on 19 December, after just nine matches.

== Managerial statistics ==
As of 24 February 2026

Team	Nat	From	To	Record				
Team	Nat	From	To	G	W	D	L	Win %
Orense	(Ecuador)	6 June 2021	13 August 2022	39	10	17	12	25.64
Raufoss	(Norway)	1 December 2022	31 December 2022	0	0	0	0	—
Jönköpings Södra	(Sweden)	1 January 2023	14 September 2023	21	6	7	8	28.57
Logroñés	(Spain)	15 October 2023	19 December 2023	9	3	1	5	33.33
Odi Sports Club	(Maldives)	21 August 2025	Present	22	14	5	3	63.64
Total				91	33	30	28	36.26

== Honours ==
=== Manager ===
Odi Sports Club

- President's Cup: 2026
