= Nelson Brito =

Ecuadorian footballer and manager (born 1960)

Personal information
- Full name: Nelson Vladimir Brito Salvador
- Date of birth: 24 October 1960 (age 66)
- Place of birth: Ecuador

Youth career
- Escuela Espejo
- Colegio Anderson

Senior career*
Years	Team	Apps	(Gls)
- El Nacional
- Deportivo Quito
- Independiente José Terán

Managerial career
- 1997–2000: Deportivo Quito (assistant)
- 2001–2004: MetroStars (assistant)
- 2004: Aucas (youth)
- 2005–2007: Deportivo Quito (assistant)
- 2007–2008: Independiente José Terán
- 2008: Pastaza Moto Club
- 2009: Aucas (assistant)
- 2011: UT Cotopaxi
- 2011: ESPOLI (assistant)
- 2014: ESPOLI
- 2015: Deportivo Quevedo
- 2018: Colorados
- 2021: Deportivo Guano
- 2021: Olmedo
- * Club domestic league appearances and goals

Nelson Vladimir Brito Salvador (born 24 October 1960) is an Ecuadorian football manager and former player.
