= Marcelo Elizaga =

Ecuadorian footballer (born 1972)

Personal information
- Full name: Marcelo Ramón Elizaga Ferrero
- Date of birth: April 19, 1972 (age 54)
- Place of birth: Morón, Argentina
- Height: 1.87 m (6 ft 2 in)
- Position: Goalkeeper

Senior career*
Years	Team	Apps	(Gls)
1992–1998	Nueva Chicago	98	(0)
1998–2000	Lanús	41	(0)
2000–2004	Quilmes	104	(0)
2005–2010	Emelec	223	(0)
2011–2012	Deportivo Quito	33	(0)
Total		502	(0)

International career^{‡}
2007–2012	Ecuador	23	(0)
- * Club domestic league appearances and goals as of 7 December 2009 ‡ National team caps and goals as of 16 May 2010

Marcelo Ramón Elizaga Ferrero (born April 19, 1972) is a former professional footballer who played as a goalkeeper. He played for Deportivo Quito in the Ecuador Serie A and the Ecuador national team.

== Club career ==
Elizaga started his career in 1992 for Nueva Chicago in the Argentine 2nd division. In 1998, he transferred to Club Atlético Lanús in the Primera Division Argentina.

In 2000, he joined Quilmes Atlético Club in the 2nd division and helped them gain promotion to the Primera. Since transferring to Emelec he has received awards including Goalkeeper of the Year in 2004, 2005, 2006, 2008 and 2009 from the Ecuadorian Championship.

Elizaga became a citizen of Ecuador after declaring his intention of playing in the international stage. He has also stated that he has a love for his new country.

== Emelec ==
He arrived to Ecuador in 2004 as one of four foreign players signed by Emelec for that season. He immediately started showing great goalkeeping skills and despite or because Emelec's poor season he quickly became a fan favourite thanks to his performances for the club, and he won his first award of many for best goalkeeper of the year in Ecuador. He was ratified in the club for the next season and once again he became Emelec's best player helping the club avoid relegation for the second season in a row, and winning his second best goalkeeper of the year award in a row.

Six years later he remains in the club despite many opportunities to leave and he is its captain and fan favourite. He has openly declared his intentions of retiring playing for Emelec, but not before winning a title with the club, he was very close in 2006 when Emelec finished second behind El Nacional and in 2009 when they finished third in the Ecuadorian tournament.

In 2010, Elizaga helped Emelec to qualify to that year's final matches against LDU Quito, but controversially was sent to the bench in this two matches by the team's manager Jorge Luis Sampaoli. Emelec could not score more than two goals in the final match, so Liga won the championship (Emelec lost the away match 2–0, so had to win at least 2–0 to secure penalty definition, but only scored one goal).

On 30 December 2010, Elizaga left Emelec and signed with Deportivo Quito for one season, a transfer that was met with lot of surprise specially by Emelec's fans.

In December 2011, Elizaga won the national championship with his new club Deportivo Quito, winning the title against his past team Emelec, playing the two finals and keeping a clean sheet.

== International career ==
He made his international debut in May 2007 with Ecuador against Ireland. They later tied 1–1. Selected for the 2007 Copa América, he demonstrated superb goalkeeping skill during Ecuador's final match against giants Brazil keeping the score level until Robinho's penalty. They were eliminated 1–0.

Elizaga later got called up for the 3rd and 4th rounds of the FIFA World Cup Qualification in the CONMEBOL region against Paraguay and Peru. Elizaga kept the Peruvians off the scoreboard until he was substituted off. He did not receive a call up for a while but is being put back on the line-up and has demonstrated good showings including Ecuador's victory over Colombia at Giants Stadium, where he stopped a penalty kick as well as the rebound.

He continually receives call-ups for the national team, often as a back-up for José Francisco Cevallos. In June 2009, he started in World Cup qualifiers against Peru and Argentina in place of the injured Cevallos. During those matches, he helped the squad earn crucial points for qualification, including a clean-sheet against Argentina in which he saved a penalty kick against Carlos Tevez during the first half of the match. He also performed strongly during a decisive match against Uruguay, but conceded a penalty kick (converted by Diego Forlan) after bringing down an Uruguayan striker in the last minutes of the game, resulting in a 1–2 loss.

In 2011, he was called up once again to guard Ecuador's goal posts, this time during the Copa America played in Argentina.
