= Flavio Perlaza =

Ecuadorian footballer (born 1952)

Personal information
- Full name: Flavio Arturo Perlaza Concha
- Date of birth: 7 October 1952 (age 74)
- Position: Defender

Senior career*
Years	Team	Apps	(Gls)
- El Nacional
- Barcelona S.C.

International career
1979–1985	Ecuador	24	(1)
- * Club domestic league appearances and goals

Flavio Arturo Perlaza Concha (born 7 October 1952) is an Ecuadorian former footballer who played as a defender for El Nacional and Barcelona S.C.. He made 24 appearances for the Ecuador national team from 1979 to 1985. He was also part of Ecuador's squad for the 1979 Copa América tournament.
