= Orlando Narváez =

Ecuadorian footballer (born 1958)

Personal information
- Date of birth: 26 June 1958 (age 68)
- Place of birth: Quito, Ecuador

International career
Years	Team	Apps	(Gls)
1983	Ecuador	5	(0)

Orlando Narváez (born 26 June 1958) is an Ecuadorian footballer. He played in five matches for the Ecuador national football team in 1983. He was also part of Ecuador's squad for the 1983 Copa América tournament.
