= Geovanny Mera =

Ecuadorian footballer (born 1962)

Personal information
- Date of birth: 16 August 1962 (age 64)
- Place of birth: Ambato, Ecuador

International career
Years	Team	Apps	(Gls)
1987	Ecuador	5	(1)

Geovanny Mera (born 16 August 1962) is an Ecuadorian footballer. He played in five matches for the Ecuador national football team in 1987. He was also part of Ecuador's squad for the 1987 Copa América tournament.
