= Omar Andrade =

Ecuadorian footballer and manager (born 1986)

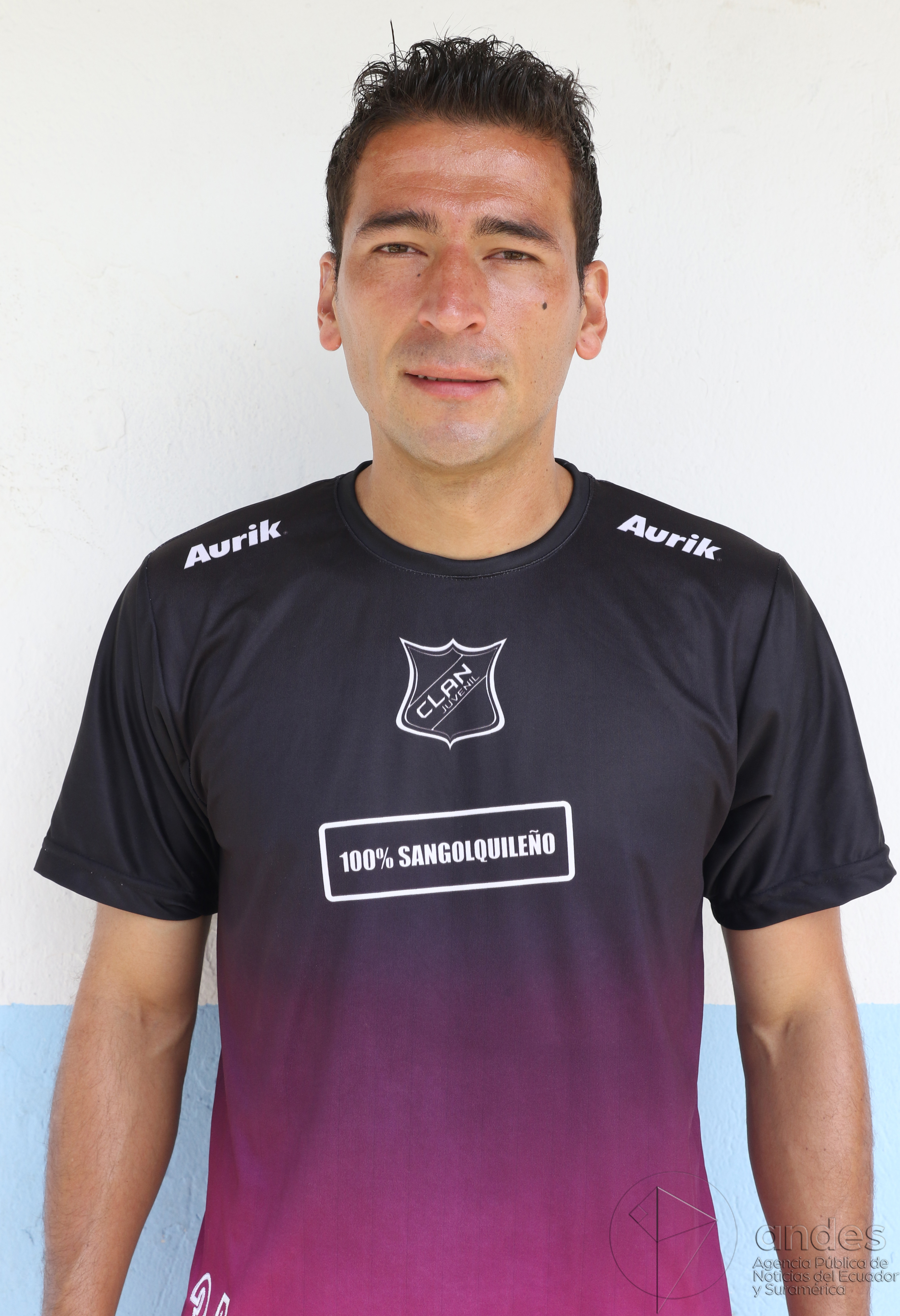

Personal information
- Full name: Omar Santiago Andrade Terán
- Date of birth: 16 June 1986 (age 40)
- Place of birth: Ibarra, Ecuador
- Height: 1.78 m (5 ft 10 in)
- Position: Winger

Team information
- Current team: Cancún (Assistant)

Youth career
- LDU Quito

Senior career*
Years	Team	Apps	(Gls)
2005	LDU Quito	6	(1)
2006–2008	ESPOLI	61	(16)
2009	Imbabura	31	(7)
2010	Olmedo	28	(2)
2011–2012	Deportivo Cuenca	63	(4)
2013–2014	Deportivo Quito	21	(0)
2014–2015	Aucas	50	(6)
2016	ESPOLI	15	(4)
2017	Clan Juvenil	6	(0)
2018	ESPOLI		

Managerial career
- Universidad Católica (youth)
- 2021: Universidad Católica (interim)
- 2025–: Cancún (Assistant)
- * Club domestic league appearances and goals

Omar Santiago Andrade Terán (born 16 June 1986) is an Ecuadorian football manager and former player who played as a winger. He is the current manager of Universidad Católica del Ecuador's youth setup.
