= Héctor González (footballer, born 1972) =

Ecuadorian footballer

Personal information
- Full name: Héctor Manuel González Ortíz
- Date of birth: 5 April 1972 (age 54)
- Place of birth: Esmeraldas, Ecuador
- Position: Midfielder

Senior career*
Years	Team	Apps	(Gls)
1991–1994	LDU Quito		
1995–2005	Olmedo	340	(25)

International career
1997	Ecuador	1	(0)

Managerial career
- 2009: Olmedo
- 2010: Olmedo (interim)
- 2012: Olmedo (interim)
- 2012: Olmedo (interim)
- 2013: Olmedo
- 2014: Olmedo (interim)
- 2014: Olmedo (interim)
- 2015: Olmedo
- 2016–2021: Atlético Santo Domingo
- 2021–2022: Olmedo
- * Club domestic league appearances and goals

Héctor Manuel González Ortíz (born 5 April 1972) is an Ecuadorian football manager and former player who played as a midfielder.

== International career ==
González was a member of the Ecuador national football team at the 1997 Copa América. He obtained just one international cap during his career, on 28 May 1997, in a friendly against El Salvador.
