= Fabián Bustos =

Argentine footballer and manager

- Bustos in 2020

Personal information
- Full name: Fabián Daniel Bustos Barbero
- Date of birth: 28 March 1969 (age 57)
- Place of birth: Córdoba, Argentina
- Height: 1.75 m (5 ft 9 in)
- Position: Forward

Team information
- Current team: Universitario (manager)

Youth career
- 1979–1985: San Lorenzo de Córdoba

Senior career*
Years	Team	Apps	(Gls)
1986–1988	San Lorenzo de Córdoba		
1989	Argentino (MJ)	6	(1)
1990	San Lorenzo de Córdoba		
1991	Nacional	4	(1)
1991–1992	Almirante Brown	41	(11)
1992–1994	Lanús	19	(0)
1994–1995	Belgrano	13	(0)
1995–1996	Deportivo Morón	32	(1)
1996–1997	Juventud Antoniana	29	(5)
1997–1999	Atlético Tucumán	68	(15)
1999	Cipolletti	13	(4)
2000	Jorge Wilsterman	12	(1)
2000–2001	Deportivo Quito	58	(18)
2002	Manta	16	(5)
2002	Macará	16	(3)
2003	Deportivo Saquisilí	33	(20)
2004–2005	El Porvenir	49	(8)
2005–2006	Estudiantes Buenos Aires	13	(0)

Managerial career
- 2006: Sarmiento (assistant)
- 2007–2008: El Porvenir (assistant)
- 2008: Acassuso (assistant)
- 2009–2010: Manta
- 2011: Deportivo Quito
- 2011: Imbabura
- 2012: Técnico Universitario
- 2012–2013: Macará
- 2013: Manta
- 2014: LDU Portoviejo
- 2015–2016: Delfín
- 2018–2019: Delfín
- 2020–2022: Barcelona SC
- 2022: Santos
- 2022–2023: Barcelona SC
- 2023: América Mineiro
- 2024–2025: Universitario
- 2025: Olimpia
- 2026: Millonarios
- 2026–: Universitario
- * Club domestic league appearances and goals

Fabián Daniel Bustos Barbero (born 28 March 1969) is an Argentine football manager and former player who played as a forward. He is the current manager of Peruvian club Universitario.

Bustos played for local sides during the major part of his career, amassing 32 appearances in the Argentine Primera División with Lanús and Belgrano. He also played in Uruguay with Nacional, in Bolivia with Jorge Wilstermann, and in Ecuador with Deportivo Quito, Macará, Manta and Deportivo Saquisilí, but retired back in his home country with Estudiantes de Buenos Aires.

After retiring, Bustos worked as an assistant manager before becoming a manager in 2009, with Manta. He continued to manage in Ecuador, winning two Ecuadorian Serie A titles with Delfín and Barcelona SC before being named in charge of Brazilian club Santos in 2022.

== Playing career ==
Born in Córdoba, Bustos began his senior career with local side San Lorenzo de Córdoba in 1986. He moved to Argentino de Marcos Juárez in 1989, before returning to his previous club in 1990, and moved to Primera B Nacional side Almirante Brown in the following year, after a short stint at Uruguayan side Nacional.

In 1992, Bustos signed for Lanús in the Argentine Primera División, but featured sparingly before moving to fellow league team Belgrano in 1994. He went on to play for second division sides in the following five seasons, representing Deportivo Morón, Juventud Antoniana, Atlético Tucumán and Cipolletti, before moving abroad in 2000 with Bolivian side Jorge Wilsterman.

Bustos moved to Ecuador in 2000, and signed for Deportivo Quito. He then played for Manta, Macará and Deportivo Saquisilí in the country, before returning to Argentina in 2004 with El Porvenir. In 2005, he joined Estudiantes de Buenos Aires, and retired with the club in the following year, aged 36.

== Managerial career ==
=== Early career ===
After being an assistant manager at Sarmiento, El Porvenir and Acassuso, Bustos was named manager of former side Manta on 15 July 2009. He opted to leave the club on a mutual agreement on 8 December 2010, and was named manager of another club he represented as a player, Deportivo Quito, thirteen days later.

Bustos was sacked by Quito on 1 May 2011, and was presented as manager of fellow Serie A team Imbabura on 30 June. He resigned on 25 August, and took over Técnico Universitario for the ensuing season on 16 December.

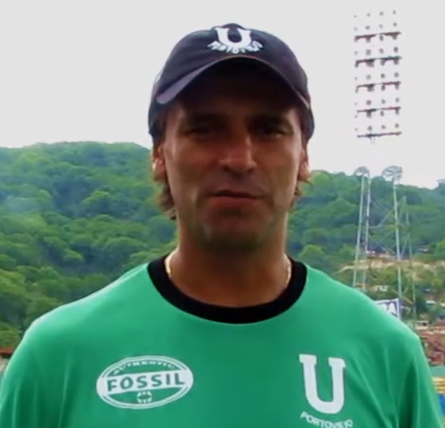
Bustos as manager of LDU Portoviejo in 2014

Dismissed by Técnico Universitario on 14 April 2012, Bustos was later named manager of Macará on 9 July. He resigned from the latter on 28 April 2013, and subsequently returned to Manta on 1 July. After leaving Manta at the end of his contract in December 2013, Bustos was later named manager of Serie B side LDU Portoviejo. He left the club the following 21 August.

=== Delfín ===
He was named in charge of fellow second division side Delfín on 3 January 2015. He led Delfín back to the top tier after 15 years, but was dismissed by the club on 30 April 2016. Bustos returned to the club in December 2016, now as a sporting director, but was named manager again in April 2018, after the departure of Guillermo Sanguinetti, managing to qualify Delfín to the 2019 Copa Sudamericana. He stayed in charge of the team for the following season, in which the club finished in 4th place of the first stage of the 2019 Serie A, advancing to the playoffs. After defeating Independiente del Valle, Macará and L.D.U. Quito in the final, Bustos led Delfín to their first-ever Serie A title; however, he left the club on 15 December of that year.

=== Barcelona SC ===
Immediately after leaving Delfín, Bustos took over Barcelona SC. In his first season, he won a second consecutive Serie A title, once again defeating L.D.U. Quito in the finals, and led the club to the semifinals of the 2021 Copa Libertadores. On 25 February 2022, Barcelona announced Bustos' departure through a press conference, with his last match in charge of the club occurring the following day.

=== Santos ===
On 25 February 2022, Santos announced the signing of Bustos as manager, with his contract to be signed in the following days. On 7 July, after just one win in 13 matches, he was sacked.

=== Return to Barcelona SC ===
On 5 September 2022, Bustos returned to his former club Barcelona in the place of departing Jorge Célico. He resigned on 4 June of the following year, after a 3–1 loss to rivals Emelec.

=== América Mineiro ===
On 9 August 2023, Bustos returned to Brazil and its top tier, after being named head coach of América Mineiro. On 9 November, after the club's relegation, he was dismissed.

=== Universitario de Deportes ===
On 30 December 2023, Bustos was announced as the head coach of Universitario de Deportes. He led the club to the 2024 title, after winning both the Apertura and the Clausura, but left on 14 April 2025.

=== Olimpia ===
On 17 April 2025, Bustos was announced as manager of Olimpia in Paraguay. He was dismissed on 14 July 2025, following a loss to Sportivo Trinidense on the second matchday of the 2025 Clausura tournament.

=== Millonarios ===
On 1 February 2026, Bustos was announced as manager of Colombian side Millonarios, replacing Hernán Torres. Seven months later, he was dismissed by the club.

== Personal life ==
Bustos' older brother Carlos is also a manager and former footballer. A defender, he began his career at Talleres and had the most of his managerial career in Peru and Mexico.

== Managerial statistics ==
As of 11 October 2026

Managerial record by team and tenure
Team	Nat.	From	To	Record								Ref
Team	Nat.	From	To	G	W	D	L	GF	GA	GD	Win %	Ref
Manta	(Ecuador)	14 July 2009	15 December 2010	62	19	20	23	64	86	−22	30.65	
Deportivo Quito	(Ecuador)	21 December 2010	1 May 2011	16	9	4	3	30	17	+13	56.25	
Imbabura	(Ecuador)	30 June 2011	25 August 2011	8	3	0	5	6	14	−8	37.50	
Técnico Universitario	(Ecuador)	16 December 2011	14 April 2012	11	2	4	5	9	14	−5	18.18	
Macará	(Ecuador)	9 July 2012	28 April 2013	35	11	5	19	36	53	−17	31.43	
Manta	(Ecuador)	1 July 2013	8 December 2013	22	7	6	9	21	27	−6	31.82	
LDU Portoviejo	(Ecuador)	24 December 2013	21 August 2014	27	15	4	8	45	27	+18	55.56	
Delfín	(Ecuador)	3 January 2015	30 April 2016	55	22	18	15	58	45	+13	40.00	
LDU Portoviejo	(Ecuador)	26 January 2017	10 October 2017	35	13	11	11	34	34	+0	37.14	
Delfín	(Ecuador)	15 April 2018	15 December 2019	89	42	27	20	134	96	+38	47.19	
Barcelona SC	(Ecuador)	15 December 2019	26 February 2022	93	46	23	24	138	83	+55	49.46	
Santos	(Brazil)	28 February 2022	7 July 2022	28	8	12	8	35	34	+1	28.57	
Barcelona SC	(Ecuador)	5 September 2022	4 June 2023	25	10	5	10	41	34	+7	40.00	
América Mineiro	(Brazil)	9 August 2023	9 November 2023	18	2	5	11	21	34	−13	11.11	
Universitario de Deportes	(Peru)	30 December 2023	14 April 2025	49	29	12	8	86	34	+52	59.18	
Olimpia	(Paraguay)	17 April 2025	14 July 2025	14	3	8	3	19	17	+2	21.43	
Millonarios	(Colombia)	1 February 2026	1 September 2026	32	16	9	7	58	32	+26	50.00	
Universitario de Deportes	(Peru)	30 September 2026	present	1	0	1	0	2	2	+0	0.00	
Career totals				620	257	174	189	837	683	+154	41.45	—

== Honours ==
Delfín

- Ecuadorian Serie B: 2015
- Ecuadorian Serie A: 2019

Barcelona SC

- Ecuadorian Serie A: 2020

Universitario de Deportes

- Peruvian Primera División: 2024
