= C.D. Técnico Universitario =

Ecuadorian football club

Técnico Universitario
- Full name: Club Deportivo Técnico Universitario
- Nicknames: Inferno Rojinegro; El Papá del Olmedo; Guaytambo; Rojinegro
- Founded: 26 March 1971; 55 years ago
- Ground: Estadio Bellavista
- Capacity: 16,467
- Chairman: Tito Jara
- Manager: Francisco Usúcar
- League: LigaPro Serie A
- 2025: Serie A, First stage: 13th of 16; Relegation group: 3rd of 4
- Website: tecnicouniversitario.com.ec
Home colours	Away colours	Third colours

Club Deportivo Técnico Universitario is an Ecuadorian professional football club based in Ambato. It was founded on 26 March 1971. Their city rivals are Macará. Were twice runners-up in Serie A of Ecuador in 1978 and 1980. The club is commonly known by the nickname “El Rodillo Rojo” (The Red Roller). They play their home matches at the Estadio Universidad Indoamérica Bellavista, which has a capacity of 16,467.

== Present ==
On 25 November 2011 the club crowned its great season getting promotion to the top flight as Serie B champions, winning 2–0 at home to Atlético Audaz, Orense squad failed because of administrative problems the club was suspended by FEF.

== Honours ==
=== National ===
- Serie B
  - Winners (6): 1977 E2, 1981 E2, 1999, 2002, 2011, 2017

=== Regional ===
- Segunda Categoría de Tungurahua
  - Winners (2): 1973, 1974

== Current squad ==
As of 17 February 2025.

Note: Flags indicate national team as defined under FIFA eligibility rules; some limited exceptions apply. Players may hold more than one non-FIFA nationality.

No.	Pos.	Nation	Player
1	GK	ARG	Santiago Razzeto
2	DF	ECU	Bryan Hernández
4	DF	ECU	Roberto Luzarraga
5	DF	ECU	Mauricio Cagua
6	DF	ARG	Marcio Gómez
7	MF	ECU	Luis Estupinan
8	MF	ARG	Martín Cháves
9	FW	URU	Lucas Fernandez
10	MF	COL	Johan Bocanegra
12	GK	ECU	Ayrton Morales
13	DF	COL	Julian Anaya
16	MF	ECU	Jose Caicedo

No.	Pos.	Nation	Player
17	FW	ECU	Johan Montes
23	MF	ECU	Edwin Mesa
25	FW	ECU	Bagner Delgado
27	DF	COL	Andres Copete
28	FW	ECU	Miguel Perea
30	MF	ECU	Kener Arce
31	DF	ECU	Edison Carcelén
33	MF	ECU	Jonathan Majao
67	DF	ECU	Marco Carrasco
70	MF	COL	Matheo Castano
77	MF	ECU	Carlos Estupinan
85	MF	ECU	Yorlin Arce

== Managers ==
- (Argentina) Jorge Célico (30 March 2009 - 31 December 2009)
- (Argentina) Juan Urquiza (1 January 2010 - 3 April 2010)
- (Ecuador) Geovanny Mera (3 April 2010 - 18 August 2010)
- (Ecuador) Paúl Vélez (19 August 2010 – 28 November 2011)
- (Argentina) Fabián Bustos (28 November 2011 - 13 April 2012)
- (Uruguay) Mario Saralegui (13 April 2012 – 18 June 2012)
- (Ecuador) Boris Fiallos (Interim) (19 June 2012 - 1 July 2012)
- (Argentina) José Basualdo (1 July 2012 – 6 May 2013)
- (Ecuador) Homero Mistral Valencia (6 May 2013 - 2 July 2013)
- (Ecuador) Paúl Vélez (7 July 2013 - 2 December 2014)
- (Ecuador) Carlos Calderón (1 January 2015 - 25 May 2015)
- (Ecuador) Jorge Alfonso (26 May 2015 - 12 July 2015)
- (Ecuador) Boris Fiallos (Interim) (12 July 2015 - 20 July 2015)
- (Argentina) Óscar del Solar (20 July 2015 - 6 September 2015)
- (Ecuador) Boris Fiallos (Interim) (7 September 2015 - 31 December 2015)
- (Ecuador) Geovanny Mera (13 January 2016 – 22 June 2016)
- (Ecuador) Jorge Ivan Vareles (Interim) (25 June 2016 - 5 September 2016)
- (Ecuador) Patricio Hurtado (5 September 2016 - 24 July 2018)
- (Argentina) Fabián Frías (27 July 2018 - 30 April 2019)
- (Colombia) José Hernández (1 May 2019 - 9 May 2022)
- (Argentina) Juan Urquiza (9 May 2022 -)
