= Club Deportivo Macará =

Association football club in Ecuador

Macará
- Full name: Club Social y Deportivo Macará
- Nicknames: El Idolo de Ambato (The Idol of Ambato); Celestes (Sky blues); Guaytambos
- Founded: August 25, 1939; 87 years ago
- Ground: Estadio Bellavista; Ambato, Ecuador
- Capacity: 16,467
- Chairman: Miller Salazar
- Coach: Guillermo Sanguinetti
- League: Ecuadorian Serie A
- 2025: First stage: 10th of 16; Second hexagonal: 1st of 6
- Website: clubmacara.ec
Home colours	Away colours	Third colours

Club Social y Deportivo Macará is a professional football club based in Ambato, Ecuador. Their home stadium is Bellavista, which they share with city rivals Técnico Universitario.

== History ==
Club Social y Deportivo Macará was founded in 1939 in the city of Ambato. At the time of its creation, the club adopted its traditional sky blue and white colors. Neptalí “Ñato” Barona served as the team’s first head coach. In 1946, Macará participated in an international tour in Colombia, marking one of its earliest appearances outside Ecuador.

In 1998, the club achieved promotion to the Ecuadorian Serie A. Macará qualified for the Copa Libertadores for the first time in 2017. In 2019, the club finished first in the overall table and secured qualification for the 2020 Copa Libertadores.

=== Foundation ===
In July 1939, a group of young students from Colegio Nacional Bolívar gathered to form an independent sporting club, and shortly afterwards entered a minor tournament under the name 'Independiente'. However, in searching for further guidance, they talked to Army Captain Galo Molina (a student's relative) and together they formed Macará, naming the team after Ecuador's southern army stronghold.

They offered the presidency to Mr. Jorge Vicente Alvarez, and he pronounced the following words: "Del Carchi al Macará... Macará ganará" (From Carchi to Macará... Macará will win); thus accepting the position.

=== The beginning of Primera A ===
Whilst Macará took part in Ecuadorian regional tournaments, the introduction of a National Championship saw them struggle to find a place among the best in the early 1960s. It took a while for the team to become strong and earn a permanent place in Primera A. Great players in the late 1960s and early and mid-1970s, such as Ítalo Estupiñán, Rómulo Dudar Mina, Arnaldo Sanchez Perrone (one of the best defenders Ecuador had in the late 1960s pretended from Barcelona of Guayaquil, Everest, and Ecuadorian Nacional team to play for his country in "London World Cup" in 1965) and Polo Carrera, made the team competitive. They were relegated in 1978 but eventually returned to Primera A.

=== 80's decade: the peak ===
During the late 1980's, the club featured several notable players, such as Peruvians Germán Leguía and Juan Martín Caballero, Uruguayan midfielder Rodolfo Abalde and Ecuadorian players such as Geovanny Mera, Jorge Alvear, Angel Buenaño, Juan Carlos Suárez, Ricardo Porras and Milton Rodríguez. With this squad, the team competed for top positions in national championships, and achieved several victories against major Ecuadorian clubs including Barcelona S.C, LDU Quito, and their local rivals Técnico Universitario.

=== The team since 1990 ===
In the early 1990s, the team lost consistency and would eventually get relegated to Primera B in 1991, and to Segunda Categoría in 1992, although they only stayed there for one season. In 1998, the club won the second division championship, and was promoted to Primera A, under chairman Miller Salazar. The team consolidated its position in the 2000 season and the center forward, Christian José Bottero, finished as the top scorer in Primera in 1999. At this time they had a good group of players including Daniel Garrido, John Ordoñez, Lino Sánchez and Héctor Lautaro Chiriboga, that would remain for the next season. However, the Ecuadorian economic crisis of 1999 and 2000 was a painful hit for the club, and added to that, their key player, Lino Sánchez's, suffered an injury in 2000 that would finish his career. In 2002, the club was forced to sell their stars Garrido and Patricio Urrutia and their performance suffered and they were relegated from Primera A at the end of the year. After that, Miller Salazar was less effective as manager, and was replaced by young businessman Ricardo Callejas. He brought fresh ideas and much needed investment and introduced better financial management. The team acquired fine players in Matías Urbano and Oscar Pacheco, among others. However, the club sold Urbano to Deportivo Quito by midyear, due to the player being unprepared to play in a lower division league. The team earned promotion for the 2004 season. 2004 was an unsatisfactory year, because, although having good players in Cristian Mora and Oscar Monge and others, it became difficult for the team to reach the last 6's group and be in contention for the title and the expenditure for appointing renowned coach Dussan Draskovic did not succeed as well as was hoped. The 2005 season saw the team relegated but they would be back again to the first division by 2007.

=== Today ===
For the second half of the Ecuadorian Campeonato Nacional in 2007, Macará started with Roque Raúl Alfaro as coach. After he left, they signed Argentinian, Raúl Urquiza, who did a much better job on the last stretch of the tournament. Macará kept its place on the premier section of Ecuador's Campeonato Nacional for the second year in a row.

For 2008, Macará hired Colombian coach Jaime De La Pava to the club, and replaced a significant part of the squad. Macará did not qualify for the Copa Libertadores de América. Jaquet was later confirmed as first team coach for the 2009 season.

During the 2011 season, Macara was in Primera B and moved up as the runners up at the end of the season with its rival Tecnico Universitario.

== Kit ==
Macará's kit manufacturer has been Marathon Sports since 2009 when they finished their relationship with Astro. Historically, Macará has had their kit produced by local and national manufacturers, but since late 1990s it has changed at the rate of almost a brand per year. These include: Marathon Sports, Puma, Diadora, Le Coq Sportif, Joma and Astro. The majors sponsor are Universidad Tecnológica Indoamérica, local footwear company Venus, Makrotubo, L. Gilbert, Hotel Casino Emperador and Ecuavisa, which also broadcasts the team's home games. As regards kit producers, the sponsorship deals vary from year to year, with the most recent main sponsors being Cerveza Pilsener, Banco del Pichincha, Mazda, Sunny Juices and Daihatsu.

== Rivalries ==
The club has two major rivalries: fellow ground-sharers and city rivals Técnico Universitario, the derby games referred to as the Clásico Ambateño; and Centro Deportivo Olmedo with whom they contest the Clásico Interandino.

== Achievements ==
- Serie B
  - Winners (5): 1971, 1998, 2005 Clausura, 2016, 2023
  - Runners-up (2): 2003, 2011

== Players ==
=== Current squad ===
Note: Flags indicate national team as defined under FIFA eligibility rules; some limited exceptions apply. Players may hold more than one non-FIFA nationality.

No.	Pos.	Nation	Player
1	GK	URU	Rodrigo Rodríguez
4	DF	ECU	Jairo Jimenez
5	MF	ECU	Jean Estacio
6	DF	ECU	Bryan Caicedo
7	FW	ARG	Federico Paz
8	MF	ARG	Gastón Blanc
9	FW	URU	Franco Posse
10	MF	ARG	Matías Miranda (on loan from Defensa y Justicia)
11	DF	ECU	Toño Espinoza
12	GK	ECU	Darwin Cuero
13	DF	ECU	Luis Ayala
14	DF	VEN	José Marrufo
15	MF	ECU	Martín Tello

No.	Pos.	Nation	Player
16	MF	ECU	José Luis Cazares
17	FW	ECU	Jose Zambrano
20	FW	ECU	Mateo Viera
21	DF	URU	Santiago Etchebarne
22	FW	ARG	Luca Ferro
25	DF	ECU	Denilson Bolanos
26	DF	ECU	Marlon Medranda
27	MF	ECU	Jordán Mohor
28	MF	ECU	Juan Macías
30	MF	ECU	Tommy Chamba
77	MF	ECU	Jeison Chala
87	MF	ECU	José Klinger (on loan from IDV)

=== Out on loan ===
Note: Flags indicate national team as defined under FIFA eligibility rules; some limited exceptions apply. Players may hold more than one non-FIFA nationality.

No.	Pos.	Nation	Player
—	DF	ARG	Nahuel Arena (out on loan to Independiente Rivadavia)

== Noted players ==
=== Top scorers ===
Macará has had one player become the top scorer in the national championship. He is:

- (United States) Anthony Velasquez (2006)

== Managers ==
- (Argentina) Roque Alfaro (11 April 2007 - 7 August 2007)
- (Argentina) Juan Urquiza (7 August 2007 - 7 October 2007)
- (Colombia) Jaime de la Pava (27 December 2007 - 5 March 2008)
- (Paraguay) Mario Jacquet (15 April 2008 - 8 April 2009)
- (Argentina) Víctor Marchesini (12 April 2009 - 15 March 2010)
- (Ecuador) Carlos Sevilla (16 March 2010 - 29 June 2010)
- (Ecuador) Boris Fiallos (29 June 2010 - 6 July 2010)
- (Argentina) Víctor Riggio (6 July 2010 - 14 September 2010)
- (Brazil) Janio Pinto (14 September 2010 - 11 June 2011)
- (Ecuador) Homero Mistral Valencia (8 June 2011 - 8 July 2012)
- (Argentina) Fabián Bustos (10 July 2012 – 28 April 2013)
- (Colombia) Armando Osma (29 April 2013 – 22 October 2013)
- (Argentina) Óscar Pacheco (23 October 2013 – 8 November 2013)
- (Ecuador) Christian Gómez (8 November 2013 - 31 December 2013)
- (Ecuador) Luis Espinel (11 January 2014 - 4 July 2014)
- (Ecuador) Christian Gómez (4 July 2014 - 11 June 2015)
- (Ecuador) Fernando Salazar (11 June 2015 - 14 June 2015)
- (Argentina) Marcelo Straccia (15 June 2015 - 13 December 2015)
- (Ecuador) Paúl Vélez (1 January 2016 - 25 December 2020)
- (Uruguay) Eduardo Favaro (25 December 2020 - 1 August 2021)
- (Ecuador) Paúl Vélez (9 August 2021 - 1 August 2022)
- (Uruguay) Marcelo Fleitas (2 August 2022 - 30 December 2022)
- (Bolivia) Marcelo Robledo (30 December 2022 - 9 April 2023)
- (Ecuador) Boris Fiallos (9 April 2023 - )
