= Paúl Vélez =

Ecuadorian footballer and manager (born 1971)

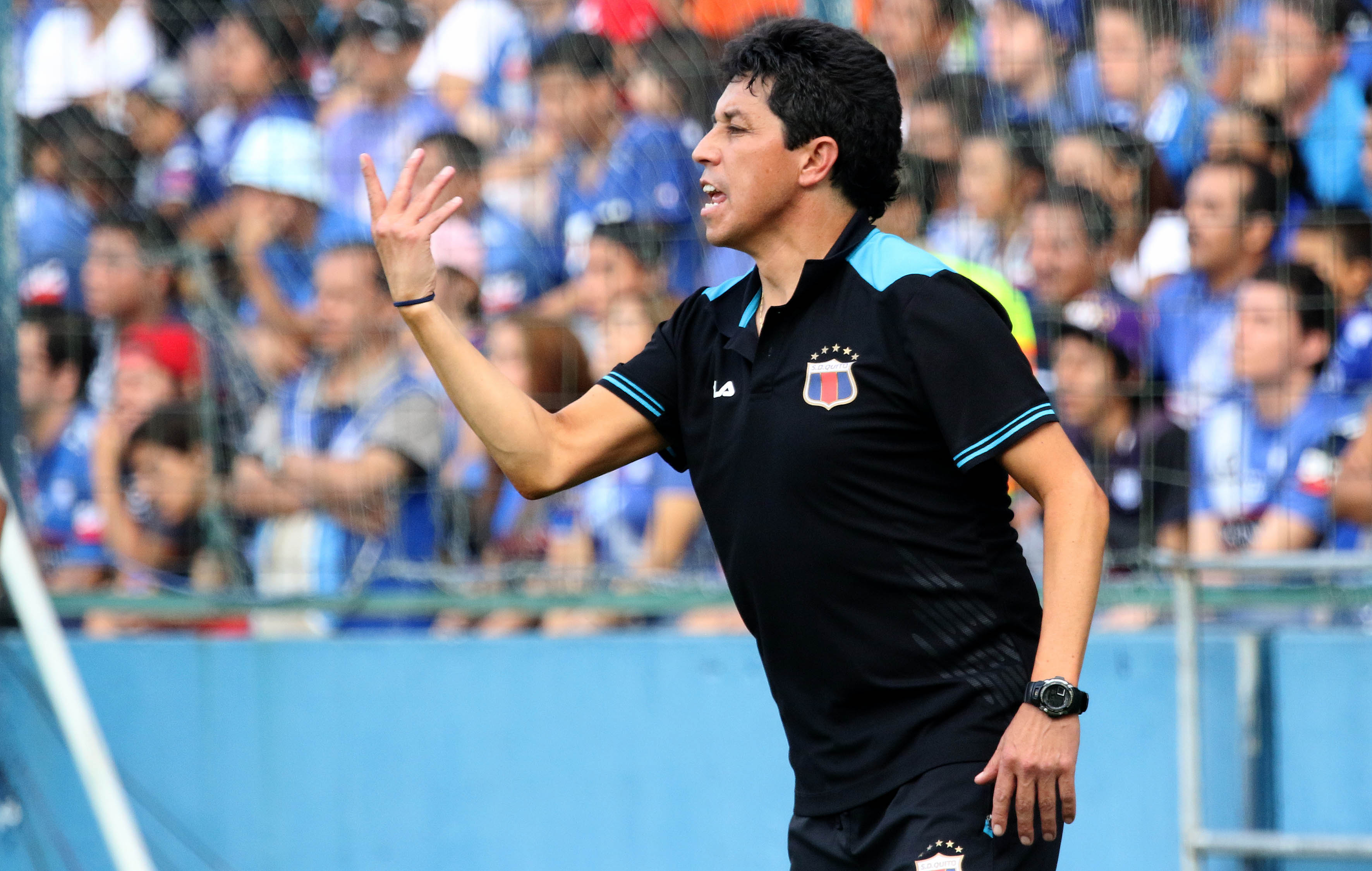
- Vélez with Deportivo Quito in 2015

Personal information
- Full name: Ángeles Paúl Vélez Ordoñez
- Date of birth: 12 May 1971 (age 55)
- Place of birth: Cuenca, Ecuador
- Position: Defender

Team information
- Current team: Mushuc Runa (manager)

Youth career
- 1983–19XX: Cruz del Vado

Senior career*
Years	Team	Apps	(Gls)
- Cruz del Vado
- LDU Cuenca
- Deportivo Cuenca

Managerial career
- 1998–1999: Deportivo Cuenca (youth assistant)
- 2000: Deportivo Cuenca (assistant)
- 2001–2006: Deportivo Cuenca (youth)
- 2007–2008: Deportivo Cuenca (assistant)
- 2008: Deportivo Cuenca (interim)
- 2009: Deportivo Cuenca (assistant)
- 2009–2010: Deportivo Cuenca
- 2010–2011: Técnico Universitario
- 2012–2013: LDU Loja
- 2013–2014: Técnico Universitario
- 2015: Deportivo Cuenca
- 2015: Deportivo Quito
- 2016–2020: Macará
- 2021: Delfín
- 2021–2022: Macará
- 2022–2023: Libertad FC
- 2024–2025: Técnico Universitario
- 2025–: Mushuc Runa
- * Club domestic league appearances and goals

Ángeles Paúl Vélez Ordoñez (born 12 May 1971) is an Ecuadorian football manager and former player who played as a defender. He is the current manager of Mushuc Runa.

== Playing career ==
Born in Cuenca, Vélez played only in local sides during his entire career. He represented Cruz del Vado, LDU Cuenca and Deportivo Cuenca, and retired in 1994, aged just 23.

== Managerial career ==
After retiring, Vélez returned to Deportivo Cuenca in 1998, to work as an assistant manager of the under-15 and later the under-20 squads. He was an assistant of the main squad in 2000, and subsequently worked as an under-16 and under-18 manager from 2001 to 2003.

Vélez was in charge of the under-17s in 2004, of the under-18s in 2005 and of the under-19s in 2006. In 2007, he became Gabriel Perrone's assistant in the main squad, and became an interim manager in October 2008, after Perrone left, and qualified the club for the 2009 Copa Libertadores.

Vélez returned to an assistant role for the 2009 campaign after Cuenca signed Guillermo Duró. In September of that year, he was again named manager after Duró resigned.

On 22 June 2010, despite finishing second in the previous tournament and again qualifying to the Libertadores, Vélez resigned. He took over Serie B side Técnico Universitario in July, leading the club to a top tier promotion before being sacked on 5 November 2011.

In December 2011, Vélez took over LDU Loja, but was relieved of his duties in May 2013. He returned to Técnico Universitario back in the second division on 2 July 2013, and narrowly missed out promotion in the 2014 season.

On 22 December 2014, Vélez returned to Deportivo Cuenca as their manager. He left the club the following 7 April due to poor results, he took over Deportivo Quito on 27 May, but left on a mutual agreement on 24 August.

Vélez was named in charge of second-level side Macará on 20 January 2016, and achieved promotion as champions in his first season. He subsequently qualified the club for two Copa Libertadores (2017 and 2019) and two Copa Sudamericana (2018 and 2020), while also being the best ranked club in the 2019 campaign.

On 28 December 2020, Vélez was presented as manager of Delfín. He left the club on mutual agreement on 31 July 2021, and was subsequently appointed for a second spell at Macará on 5 August.

Vélez was sacked by Macará on 1 August 2022. On 22 September, he was announced as manager of Libertad FC, and helped in their first-ever promotion to the top tier.

Vélez was sacked from Libertad on 24 May 2023, after only one win into the season. On 31 March 2024, after nearly one year without a club, he returned to Técnico Universitario for a third spell, with the club also in the first division.

On 20 March 2025, Vélez was sacked by Técnico Universitario, and took over fellow top tier side Mushuc Runa on 7 August.
