= 2010 Liga Deportiva Universitaria de Quito season =

LDU Quito
2010 season
- President: Carlos Arroyo
- Manager: Edgardo Bauza
- Serie A: First Stage: 2nd Second stage: 1st Aggregate: 2nd Overall: Champions (10th title)
- Copa Sudamericana: Semifinals
- Recopa Sudamericana: Champions (2nd title)
- Copa Suruga Bank: Runner-Up
- Top goalscorer: League: Hernán Barcos (22 goals); All: Hernán Barcos (28 goals)
- Highest home attendance: 27,506; (December 5 v. Emelec)
- Lowest home attendance: 0; (November 23 v. Deportivo Quito)
- Average home league attendance: 9,895
Home colours	Away colours	Third colours

Liga Deportiva Universitaria de Quito's 2010 season was the club's 80th year of existence, the 57th year in professional football, and the 49th in the top level of professional football in Ecuador. Former manager Edgardo Bauza returns to the position after Jorge Fossati left to sign with Internacional. While Liga unsuccessfully defended its 2009 title in the Copa Sudamericana and lost the Suruga Bank Championship, they became the third team to win back-to-back Recopa Sudamericanas and won their tenth Serie A title.

== Club ==
Personnel

President: Carlos Arroyo
President of the Football Commission: Edwin Ripalda
Principal directors: Rodrigo Paz & Esteban Paz
Sporting manager: Santiago Jácome

Coaching staff

Manager: Edgardo Bauza
Assistant manager: José Daniel di Leo
Physical trainer: Alejandro Mur
Goalkeeper trainer: Gustavo Flores
Statistician: Maximiliano Bauza

Kits
Supplier: Umbro
Sponsor(s): Holcim, Chevrolet, Coca-Cola, Diners Club International

Recopa Sudamericana and Copa Sudamericana kit

== Squad information ==
=== Current squad ===
Liga's squad for the season is allowed a maximum of four foreign players at any one time, and a maximum of eight throughout the season. The team must also register under-19 players to be used in every match of the league season. The jersey numbers in the main table (directly below) refer to the number on their domestic league jersey. For each CONMEBOL competition, Liga must register 25 players, whose jerseys will be numbered 1-25. Because of this, some players may have different jersey numbers while playing in CONMEBOL matches.

N	Pos	Nat.	Player	Age	Since	App	Goals	Notes
1	GK	ECU	José Francisco Cevallos	38	2008	36	0	
2	DF	ARG	Norberto Araujo	31	2007	89	0	
3	DF	ECU	Renán Calle	33	2007	60	4	
4	MF	ECU	Ulises de la Cruz	35	2009	144	20	Previously with the club from '97–'99, and '00.
5	MF	ECU	Paúl Ambrosi	29	2010	328	35	Previously with the club from '00–'09
6	DF	ECU	Jorge Guagua	28	2010	0	0	
7	MF	ECU	Miler Bolaños	19	2009	35	6	
8	MF	ECU	Patricio Urrutia	31	2010	232	42	Previously with the club from '03–'09
9	FW	ECU	Walter Calderón	32	2009	28	8	
10	MF	ECU	Christian Lara	29	2009	56	16	Previously with the club in '07
11	FW	ECU	Franklin Salas	28	2008	229	46	Previously with the club from '00–'07
12	DF	ECU	Gabriel Espinosa	21	2007	20	1	
13	DF	ECU	Néicer Reasco (captain)	32	2008	357	26	Previously with the club from '97–'00 and 01–'06
14	DF	ECU	Diego Calderón	23	2007	94	2	Previously with the club in '05
15	MF	ECU	William Araujo	30	2008	64	6	
16	FW	ARG	Hernán Barcos	25	2010	0	0	
17	MF	ECU	Enrique Gámez	28	2010	0	0	
18	FW	ECU	Víctor Estupiñán	21	2006	17	0	
19	FW	URU	Juan Manuel Salgueiro	26	2010	0	0	On loan from Estudiantes de La Plata
20	FW	ARG	Carlos Luna	27	2010	0	0	
21	MF	ECU	Ángel Cheme	25	2009	12	0	
22	GK	ECU	Alexander Domínguez	22	2006	58	0	
23	DF	ECU	Carlos Espínola	34	2009	176	16	Previously with the club from '03–'06
24	DF	ECU	José Valencia	27	2010	0	0	
25	GK	ECU	Manuel Mendoza	20	2010	0	0	
26	MF	ECU	Galo Corozo	19	2009	1	0	
28	MF	ECU	Pedro Romo	20	2008	11	0	
50	MF	ECU	Nelson Martínez	18	2010	0	0	U-19 player
51	MF	ECU	Diego Quintanilla	18	2010	0	0	U-19 player
52	FW	ECU	José Pabón	19	2010	0	0	U-19 player
53	FW	ECU	Joao Plata	17	2010	0	0	U-19 player
54	MF	ECU	Marlon Ganchozo	18	2010	0	0	U-19 player

Note: Caps and goals are of the national league and are current as of the beginning of the season.

==== Recopa Sudamericana squad ====
No.	Pos.	Nation	Player
1	GK	ECU	José Francisco Cevallos
2	DF	ARG	Norberto Araujo
3	DF	ECU	Renán Calle
4	DF	ECU	Ulises de la Cruz
5	MF	ECU	Patricio Urrutia
6	DF	ECU	Jorge Guagua
7	MF	ECU	Miler Bolaños
8	DF	ECU	Paúl Ambrosi
9	FW	ECU	Walter Calderón
10	MF	ECU	Christian Lara
11	FW	ECU	Franklin Salas
12	MF	ECU	Gabriel Espinosa
13	DF	ECU	Néicer Reasco (captain)

No.	Pos.	Nation	Player
14	MF	ECU	Diego Calderón
15	MF	ECU	William Araujo
16	FW	ARG	Hernán Barcos
17	MF	ECU	Enrique Gámez
18	FW	ECU	Víctor Estupiñán
19	FW	URU	Juan Manuel Salgueiro
20	FW	ARG	Carlos Luna
21	MF	ECU	Ángel Cheme
22	GK	ECU	Alexander Domínguez
23	DF	ECU	Carlos Espínola
24	DF	ECU	José Valencia
25	GK	ECU	Manuel Mendoza

==== Copa Sudamericana squad ====
No.	Pos.	Nation	Player
1	GK	ECU	José Francisco Cevallos
2	DF	ARG	Norberto Araujo
3	DF	ECU	Renán Calle
4	DF	ECU	Ulises de la Cruz
5	DF	ECU	Paúl Ambrosi
6	DF	ECU	Jorge Guagua
7	MF	ECU	Miler Bolaños
8	MF	ECU	Patricio Urrutia
9	FW	ECU	Walter Calderón
10	MF	ECU	Christian Lara
11	FW	ECU	Franklin Salas
12	MF	ECU	Gabriel Espinosa
13	DF	ECU	Néicer Reasco (captain)

No.	Pos.	Nation	Player
14	MF	ECU	Diego Calderón
15	MF	ECU	William Araujo
16	FW	ARG	Hernán Barcos
17	MF	ECU	Enrique Gámez
18	FW	ECU	Víctor Estupiñán
19	FW	URU	Juan Manuel Salgueiro
20	FW	ARG	Carlos Luna
21	MF	ECU	Ángel Cheme
22	GK	ECU	Alexander Domínguez
23	DF	ECU	Carlos Espínola
24	DF	ECU	José Valencia
25	GK	ECU	Manuel Mendoza

:1.José Valencia replaced Joao Plata on November 18.

=== Winter transfers ===
Players In
Name	Nat	Pos	Age	Moving from (Club nationality)
Jorge Guagua	ECU	DF	28	El Nacional (ECU)
Manuel Mendoza	ECU	GK	20	LDU Portoviejo (ECU)
Alex Bolaños	ECU	MF	24	Free agent
Miguel Bravo	ECU	MF	23	Free agent
Hernán Barcos	ARG	FW	25	Free agent
Enrique Gámez	ECU	MF	28	Macará (ECU)
José Valencia	ECU	DF	27	Free agent
Juan Manuel Salgueiro	URU	FW	26	Estudiantes (ARG)
Patricio Urrutia	ECU	MF	31	Free agent

- ^2Alex Bolaños signed with the team after the 2009 summer transfer window and was ineligible to play in the national league at the moment of signing.

Players Out
Name	Nat	Pos	Age	Moving to (Club nationality)
Jayro Campos	ECU	DF	25	Atlético Mineiro (BRA)
Claudio Graf	ARG	FW	33	Released
Daniel Viteri	ECU	GK	28	Released
Danny Vera	ECU	MF	29	Released
Pedro Larrea	ECU	DF	23	Macará (loan) (ECU)
Claudio Bieler	ARG	FW	25	Racing (ARG)
Edder Vaca	ECU	FW	25	Independiente del Valle (ECU)
Alex Bolaños	ECU	MF	25	Universidad Católica (loan) (ECU)
Miguel Bravo	ECU	MF	23	Olmedo (loan) (ECU)
Israel Chango	ECU	MF	20	LDU Loja (loan) (ECU)
Alfonso Obregón	ECU	MF	38	Retired

=== Summer transfers ===
Players In
Name	Nat	Pos	Age	Moving from (Club nationality)
Carlos Luna	ARG	FW	28	Tigre (ARG)
Paúl Ambrosi	ECU	DF	29	Rosario Central (ARG)

Players Out
Name	Nat	Pos	Age	Moving to (Club nationality)
Édison Méndez	ECU	MF	31	Atlético Mineiro (BRA)
Enrique Vera	PAR	MF	31	Atlas by América (MEX)

- ^3Enrique Vera's sporting rights belonged to Mexican club América, who transferred Vera to Atlas.

== Competitions ==
Competition	Started round	Final position / round	First match	Last match
Serie A	First Stage	Champions	Feb 7	Dec 12
Recopa Sudamericana	Final	Champions	Aug 25	Sep 8
Copa Sudamericana	Round of 16	Semifinals	Oct 12	Nov 25
Suruga Bank Championship	Final	Runner-up	Aug 4	

Source: Competitions

=== Pre-season friendlies ===
The pre-season friendlies against Universidad César Vallejo was played in two matches at Liga's training grounds. The first match was between the reserves of each team, the second by the starters. The matches were played in two 30-minutes halves. Only club officials and credited media sources were allowed to watch.

January 19	LDU Quito reserves (Ecuador)	1–0	(Peru) Universidad César Vallejo reserves	Complejo de Pomasqui
10:00 (UTC−5)	W. Calderón (?)	Report

January 19	LDU Quito starters (Ecuador)	3–0	(Peru) Universidad César Vallejo starters	Complejo de Pomasqui
11:00 (UTC−5)	Barcos (?) de la Cruz (?)	Report

January 22	LDU Quito reserves (Ecuador)	2–1	(Ecuador) Universidad Católica reserves	Complejo de Pomasqui
	Salas (?); Estupiñán (?)	Report	Iza (?)

January 22	LDU Quito starters (Ecuador)	3–1	(Ecuador) Universidad Católica starters	Complejo de Pomasqui
	W. Araujo (?); Méndez (?) de la Cruz (?)	Report	Guerra (?)

January 27	LDU Quito reserves (Ecuador)	5–0	(Ecuador) ESPOLI reserves	Estadio Casa Blanca, Quito
		Report

January 27	LDU Quito starters (Ecuador)	4–1	(Ecuador) ESPOLI reserves	Estadio Casa Blanca, Quito
	Méndez (?); Barcos (?); Reasco (?)	Report

==== La Tarde Blanca ====
In La Tarde Blanca, the club's official presentation for the season, Liga hammered visiting Sporting Cristal of Peru 5–0. The effortless win came with goals from veterans Ulises de la Cruz, Christian Lara (2), Édison Méndez, and recently signed Hernán Barcos.

January 30 La Tarde Blanca	LDU Quito (Ecuador)	5–0	(Peru) Sporting Cristal	Estadio Casa Blanca, Quito
15:30 (UTC−5)	de la Cruz 4'; Barcos 28'; Lara 33', 56'; Méndez 80'			Attendance: 15,987; Referee: Tomás Alarcón

=== Other friendlies ===
LDU Quito has accepted an invitation to play against Serie B team LDU Loja for their official debut of the season.

February 17	LDU Loja	1–1	LDU Quito	Estadio Reina del Cisne, Loja
19:00 (UTC−5)				Referee: Kléber Rojas

=== Alfonso Obregón's farewell match ===
A testimonial match was organized for the retirement of longtime midfielder and former team captain Alfonso Obregón. The match was played at La Casa Blanca on May 16. The game pitted current LDU Quito players against a team called Alfonso Obregón & Friends, composed of famous Liga and Ecuadorian footballers of the past. The legends team would be managed by former Liga manager, and two-time Serie A winning manager with Liga, Leonel Montoya. Alfonso Obregón would play a half for each team in the match.

May 16
12:00 (UTC−5)

LDU Quito	5–2	Alfonso Obregón & Friends
Barcos 16'; Bolaños 30', 64'; T. Valencia 50'; Estupiñán 65'	Article	Castillo 10'; Zambrano 17'

Estadio Casa Blanca, Quito
Referee: Byron Moreno

LDU QUITO:
GK	-	(Ecuador) José Francisco Cevallos
DF	-	(Ecuador) Nelson Martínez
DF	-	(Argentina) Norberto Araujo
DF	-	(Ecuador) Jorge Guagua
DF	-	(Ecuador) José Valencia
MF	-	(Ecuador) William Araujo
MF	-	(Ecuador) Patricio Urrutia (c)
MF	-	(Ecuador) Miler Bolaños
MF	-	(Ecuador) Ángel Cheme
FW	-	(Uruguay) Juan Manuel Salgueiro
FW	-	(Argentina) Hernán Barcos
Substitutes:
DF	-	(Ecuador) Diego Quintanilla
DF	-	(Ecuador) Wálter Reyes
MF	-	(Ecuador) Cristian Hurtado
MF	-	(Ecuador) Alfonso Obregón
MF	-	(Ecuador) Michel Cobeña (Obregón's god-son)
MF	-	(Ecuador) Pedro Romo
FW	-	(Ecuador) Tito Valencia
FW	-	(Ecuador) Víctor Estupiñán
Manager:
(Argentina) Edgardo Bauza

ALFONSO OBREGÓN & FRIENDS:
GK	-	(Ecuador) Fabricio Correa (The President's brother)
DF	-	(Ecuador) Luis Gómez
DF	-	(Ecuador) Alberto Montaño
DF	-	(Ecuador) Santiago Jácome
DF	-	(Ecuador) Néicer Reasco
MF	-	(Ecuador) Alfonso Obregón
MF	-	(Ecuador) Segundo Castillo
MF	-	(Ecuador) Édison Méndez
MF	-	(Ecuador) Álex Aguinaga
FW	-	(Ecuador) Luis Zambrano
FW	-	(Ecuador) Eduardo Hurtado
Substitutes:
GK	-	(Ecuador) Jacinto Espinoza
DF	-	(Ecuador) Fabián Mendoza
DF	-	(Ecuador) Diego Calderón
MF	-	(Ecuador) Carlos Tenorio
MF	-	(Ecuador) Christian Lara
MF	-	(Ecuador) Líder Mejía
FW	-	(Ecuador) Ariel Graziani
FW	-	(Ecuador) John Arteaga
FW	-	(Ecuador) Roberspierre Pinargote
Manager:
(Colombia) Leonel Montoya

=== Serie A ===
2010 will be LDU Quito's 49th season in the Serie A.

==== First stage ====
Pos	Team	Pld	W	D	L	GF	GA	GD	Pts	Qualification
1	Emelec	22	14	4	4	36	21	+15	46	Finals, the 2010 Copa Sudamericana Second Stage, and the 2011 Copa Libertadores Second Stage
2	LDU Quito	22	12	8	2	36	10	+26	44	2010 Copa Sudamericana Round of 16 (Note: LDU Quito was already qualified to the 2010 Copa Sudamericana as the defending champion.)
3	Barcelona	22	12	7	3	26	12	+14	43	2010 Copa Sudamericana First Stage
4	Deportivo Quito	22	10	4	8	27	23	+4	34	2010 Copa Sudamericana First Stage
5	Deportivo Cuenca	22	6	9	7	21	25	−4	27	

Rules for classification: 1st points; 2nd goal difference; 3rd number of goals scored.
Notes:

Overall								Home						Away					
Pld	W	D	L	GF	GA	GD	Pts	W	D	L	GF	GA	GD	W	D	L	GF	GA	GD
22	12	8	2	36	10	+26	44	9	2	0	27	3	+24	3	6	2	9	7	+2

Round	1	2	3	4	5	6	7	8	9	10	11	12	13	14	15	16	17	18	19	20	21	22
Ground	A	H	A	H	A	H	A	H	H	A	H	A	H	A	A	H	A	H	A	H	A	H
Result	D	W	W	W	W	D	D	W	D	D	W	D	W	D	D	W	L	W	L	W	W	W
Position	3	2	2	1	1	1	2	2	2	2	2	2	2	2	2	2	3	3	3	2	2	2

A = Away; H = Home; W = Win; D = Draw; L = Loss

February 7 Round 1	Macará	2–2	LDU Quito	Estadio Bellavista, Ambato
11:45 (UTC−5)	Fernández 26', 65'	Report	Barcos 86'; Salas 88'	Attendance: 11,197; Referee: Carlos Vera

February 12 Round 2	LDU Quito	3–0	Independiente del Valle	Estadio Casa Blanca, Quito
19:00 (UTC−5)	Lara 17'; Méndez 43' (pen.); Barcos 90'	Report		Attendance: 8,664; Referee: Diego Lara

February 21 Round 3	Olmedo	0–1	LDU Quito	Estadio Olímpico, Riobamba
12:00 (UTC−5)		Report	Barcos 30'	Attendance: 6,722; Referee: Tomás Alarcón

February 28 Round 4	LDU Quito	5–0	Emelec	Estadio Casa Blanca, Quito
11:30 (UTC−5)	Vera 12'; Méndez 21'; Barcos 56'; Salgueiro 80', 84'	Report		Attendance: 19,298; Referee: Omar Ponce

March 6 Round 5	Deportivo Quito	0–1	LDU Quito	Estadio Olímpico Atahualpa, Quito
16:00 (UTC−5)		Report	Méndez 15'	Attendance: 25,697; Referee: Carlos Vera

March 14 Round 6	LDU Quito	1–1	ESPOLI	Estadio Casa Blanca, Quito
11:30 (UTC−5)	Barcos 2'	Report	Bone 90+2'	Attendance: 8,651; Referee: Diego Lara

March 19 Round 7	Manta	0–0	LDU Quito	Estadio Jocay, Manta
20:00 (UTC−5)		Report		Attendance: 4,015; Referee: Tomás Alarcón

March 28 Round 8	LDU Quito	1–0	El Nacional	Estadio Casa Blanca, Quito
11:30 (UTC−5)	Salgueiro 18'	Report		Attendance: 12,549; Referee: José Caprio

April 4 Round 9	LDU Quito	0–0	Barcelona	Estadio Casa Blanca, Quito
11:30 (UTC−5)		Report		Attendance: 27,265; Referee: Carlos Vera

April 12 Round 10	Deportivo Cuenca	1–1	LDU Quito	Estadio Alejandro Serrano Aguilar, Cuenca
18:00 (UTC−5)	Cordero 89'	Report	W. Calderón 21'	Referee: Diego Lara

April 18 Round 11	LDU Quito	2–1	Universidad Católica	Estadio Casa Blanca, Quito
11:30 (UTC−5)	C. Lara 10'; Salas 74'	Report	Guerra 23'	Attendance: 4,607; Referee: José Caprio

April 25 Round 12	Universidad Católica	1–1	LDU Quito	Estadio Olímpico Atahualpa, Quito
11:30 (UTC−5)	Guerra 65'	Report	Martínez 17'	Attendance: 5,491; Referee: José Espinel

May 2 Round 13	LDU Quito	2–0	Deportivo Cuenca	Estadio Casa Blanca, Quito
11:30 (UTC−5)	Méndez 27' (pen.), 78'	Report		Attendance: 5,123; Referee: Omar Ponce

May 23 Round 14	Barcelona	0–0	LDU Quito	Estadio Monumental Banco Pichincha, Guayaquil
18:30 (UTC−5)		Report		Attendance: 50,087; Referee: José Caprio

May 30 Round 15	El Nacional	0–0	LDU Quito	Estadio Olímpico Atahualpa, Quito
12:00 (UTC−5)		Report		Attendance: 9,923; Referee: Alfredo Intriago

June 2 Round 16	LDU Quito	3–0	Manta	Estadio Casa Blanca, Quito
19:30 (UTC−5)	Barcos 2', 43', 58'	Report		Attendance: 2,623; Referee: Daniel Salazar

June 6 Round 17	ESPOLI	2–1	LDU Quito	Olímpico Etho Vega, Santo Domingo
16:00 (UTC−5)	de Jesús 42'; Márquez 89'	Report	Reasco 30'	Attendance: 9,459; Referee: José Caprio

June 12 Round 18	LDU Quito	2–0	Deportivo Quito	Estadio Casa Blanca, Quito
18:15 (UTC−5)	Méndez 26' (pen.); Salgueiro 45'	Report		Referee: Carlos Vera

June 16 Round 19	Emelec	1–0	LDU Quito	Estadio George Capwell, Guayaquil
14:00 (UTC−5)	Ayoví 90+3'	Report		Attendance: 1,348; Referee: Tomás Alarcón

June 20 Round 20	LDU Quito	5–0	Olmedo	Estadio Casa Blanca, Quito
11:00 (UTC−5)	Barcos 11', 66'; Bolaños 20', 52'; Reasco 80'	Report		Attendance: 1,017; Referee: Alfredo Intriago

June 27 Round 21	Independiente del Valle	0–2	LDU Quito	Estadio Rumiñahui, Sangolquí
16:00 (UTC−5)		Report	Barcos 9' (pen.); Reasco 67'	Attendance: 3,951; Referee: Omar Ponce

July 4 Round 22	LDU Quito	3–1	Macará	Estadio Casa Blanca, Quito
11:30 (UTC−5)	Barcos 4', 55', 61'	Report	Kaviedes 63'	Referee: Edgar Hinostroza

==== Second stage ====
Pos	Team	Pld	W	D	L	GF	GA	GD	Pts	Qualification
1	LDU Quito	22	14	5	3	42	17	+25	47	Finals, the 2011 Copa Sudamericana First Stage, and the 2011 Copa Libertadores Second Stage
2	Emelec	22	13	7	2	29	12	+17	46	
3	Deportivo Cuenca	22	12	5	5	32	25	+7	41	
4	Deportivo Quito	22	11	4	7	35	22	+13	37	
5	Barcelona	22	8	6	8	25	24	+1	30	

Rules for classification: 1) points; 2) goal difference; 3) number of goals scored.

Overall								Home						Away					
Pld	W	D	L	GF	GA	GD	Pts	W	D	L	GF	GA	GD	W	D	L	GF	GA	GD
22	14	5	3	42	17	+25	47	9	1	1	22	6	+16	5	4	2	20	11	+9

Round	1	2	3	4	5	6	7	8	9	10	11	12	13	14	15	16	17	18	19	20	21	22
Ground	H	A	H	A	H	A	A	H	A	H	A	H	A	H	A	H	H	A	H	A	H	A
Result	W	W	W	D	W	W	D	W	D	W	W	W	L	L	W	D	W	W	W	D	W	L
Position	2	1	1	1	1	1	1	1	1	1	1	1	1	1	1	1	1	1	1	1	1	1

A = Away; H = Home; W = Win; D = Draw; L = Loss

July 10 Round 1	LDU Quito	4–2	Manta	Estadio Casa Blanca, Quito
16:00 (UTC−5)	Salgueiro 19'; Barcos 45+1'; Bolaños 55'; Estupiñán 80'	Report	Romero 5', 11'	Attendance: 1,153; Referee: Sandro Vera

July 18 Round 2	El Nacional	2–3	LDU Quito	Estadio Olímpico Atahualpa, Quito
12:00 (UTC−5)	Suárez 17' (pen.); Quiñónez 33'	Report	Bolaños 29', 52', 64'	Attendance: 7,816; Referee: Diego Lara

July 22 Round 3	LDU Quito	2–1	Barcelona	Estadio Casa Blanca, Quito
19:30 (UTC−5)	Hurtado 7' (o.g.); Barcos 20'	Report	Samudio 41' (pen.)	Attendance: 27,060; Referee: Carlos Vera

July 28 Round 4	Deportivo Cuenca	1–1	LDU Quito	Estadio Alejandro Serrano Aguilar, Cuenca
20:35 (UTC−5)	Chala 86'	Report	Barcos 50'	Attendance: 15,216; Referee: Alfredo Intriago

August 10 Round 5	LDU Quito	2–0	Independiente del Valle	Estadio Casa Blanca, Quito
19:30 (UTC−5)	de la Cruz 18'; Salgueiro 62'	Report		Attendance: 4,663; Referee: Omar Ponce

August 15 Round 6	Macará	2–4	LDU Quito	Estadio Bellavista, Ambato
12:00 (UTC−5)	Mina 13'; Kaviedes 80'	Report	Urrutia 28'; Luna 43'; Barcos 69', 90'	Attendance: 6,269; Referee: Miguel Hidalgo

August 18 Round 7	Deportivo Quito	1–1	LDU Quito	Estadio Olímpico Atahualpa, Quito
19:15 (UTC−5)	Mina 77'	Report	de la Cruz 5'	Attendance: 22,569; Referee: Carlos Vera

August 22 Round 8	LDU Quito	1–0	Olmedo	Estadio Casa Blanca, Quito
11:30 (UTC−5)	Luna 16'	Report		Attendance: 2,749; Referee: Omar Ponce

August 28 Round 9	Emelec	1–1	LDU Quito	Estadio George Capwell, Guayaquil
14:00 (UTC−5)	Ayoví 69'	Report	Barcos 34'	Attendance: 13,026; Referee: Sandro Vera

September 13 Round 10	LDU Quito	1–0	Universidad Católica	Estadio Casa Blanca, Quito
19:30 (UTC−5)	de la Cruz 67'	Report		Attendance: 23,168; Referee: Omar Ponce

September 18 Round 11	ESPOLI	0–1	LDU Quito	Estadio Olímpico Etho Vega, Santo Domingo
15:00 (UTC−5)		Report	Plata 29'	Attendance: 6,321; Referee: José Caprio

September 25 Round 12	LDU Quito	3–0	ESPOLI	Estadio Casa Blanca, Quito
18:15 (UTC−5)	D. Calderón 75'; Luna 86'; Salgueiro 89'	Report		Attendance: 3,248; Referee: Sandro Vera

September 28 Round 13	Universidad Católica	2–1	LDU Quito	Estadio Olímpico Atahualpa, Quito
19:30 (UTC−5)	C. Guerra 18'; Cortéz 68'	Report	de la Cruz 83'	Attendance: 1,007; Referee: Diego Lara

October 3 Round 14	LDU Quito	0–1	Emelec	Estadio Casa Blanca, Quito
11:30 (UTC−5)		Report	Valencia 47'	Attendance: 12,771; Referee: Carlos Vera

October 16 Round 15	Olmedo	0–3	LDU Quito	Estadio Olímpico, Riobamba
16:00 (UTC−5)		Report	Guagua 25', 68'; Barcos 45'	Attendance: 3,615; Referee: Omar Ponce

October 23 Round 17	LDU Quito	3–0	Macará	Estadio Casa Blanca, Quito
18:15 (UTC−5)	Reasco 54'; Barcos 76'; Cheme 90+1'	Report		Attendance: 2,436; Referee: José Carpio

October 29 Round 18	Independiente del Valle	0–4	LDU Quito	Estadio Rumiñahui, Sangolquí
15:00 (UTC−5)		Report	de la Cruz 2'; Salgueiro 34' (pen.); Luna 45'; Cheme 75'	Attendance: 3,931; Referee: Alfredo Intriago

November 6 Round 19	LDU Quito	2–0	Deportivo Cuenca	Estadio Casa Blanca, Quito
18:15 (UTC−5)	Guagua 11'; Luna 18'	Report		Attendance: 17,107; Referee: Carlos Vera

November 14 Round 20	Barcelona	1–1	LDU Quito	Estadio Monumental Banco Pichincha, Guayaquil
17:00 (UTC−5)	Palacios 75'	Report	Luna 28'	Attendance: 7,371; Referee: José Carpio

November 22 Round 21	LDU Quito	3–1	El Nacional	Estadio Casa Blanca, Quito
19:30 (UTC−5)	de la Cruz 20'; Bolaños 56'; W. Araujo 73'	Report	Madrid 17'	Attendance: 3,756

November 23 Round 16 (Postponed)	LDU Quito	1–1	Deportivo Quito	Estadio Casa Blanca, Quito
9:00 (UTC−5)	Lara 86'	Report	García 36'	Attendance: 0 Referee: Daniel Salazar

November 27 Round 22	Manta	1–0	LDU Quito	Estadio Jocay, Manta
12:00 (UTC−5)	Bevacqua 81'	Report		Attendance: 1,000; Referee: Alfredo Intriago

==== Third stage ====
Pos	Team	Pld	W	D	L	GF	GA	GD	Pts
1	LDU Quito	2	1	0	1	2	1	+1	3
2	Emelec	2	1	0	1	1	2	−1	3

December 5	LDU Quito	2–0	Emelec	Estadio Casa Blanca, Quito
11:30 (UTC−5)	Bolaños 50', 90+2'	Report		Attendance: 27,506; Referee: Tomás Alarcón

December 12	Emelec	1–0	LDU Quito	Estadio George Capwell, Guayaquil
16:00 (UTC−5)	Quiroz 60'	Report		Attendance: 23,112; Referee: Carlos Vera

=== Recopa Sudamericana ===
As the 2009 Copa Sudamericana champion, LDU Quito played a two-legged tie against the 2009 Copa Libertadores champion Estudiantes de La Plata. LDU Quito successfully defended their title after winning the first leg 2–1 and drawing the second leg 0–0. They became the third team to win back-to-back Recopa Sudamericanas.

August 25	LDU Quito (Ecuador)	2–1	(Argentina) Estudiantes	Estadio Casa Blanca, Quito
20:15 (UTC−5)	Barcos 8', 17'	Report	Rojo 12'	Referee: Roberto Silvera (Uruguay)

September 8	Estudiantes (Argentina)	0–0	(Ecuador) LDU Quito	Estadio Centenario Dr. José Luis Meiszner, Quilmes
21:15 (UTC−3)		Report		Referee: Carlos Simon (Brazil)

=== Copa Suruga Bank ===
As the 2009 Copa Sudamericana champion, LDU Quito played a single match against the 2009 J.League Cup champion FC Tokyo.

August 4	FC Tokyo (Japan)	2–2 (4–3 p)	(Ecuador) LDU Quito	National Stadium, Shinjuku, Tokyo
19:00 (UTC+9)	Hirayama 34'; Oguro 90'	Report	Barcos 28'; Urrutia 62' (pen.)	Attendance: 19,423; Referee: Stuart Attwell (England)
	Penalties
	Oguro (penalty scored); Matsushita (penalty scored); Shigematsu (penalty missed); Konno (penalty scored); Kajiyama (penalty scored)		(penalty missed) Urrutia; (penalty scored) de la Cruz; (penalty scored) Lara; (penalty missed) Luna; (penalty scored) Calle

=== Copa Sudamericana ===
LDU Quito qualified to their 7th Copa Sudamericana as the defending champion. They entered the competition in the Round of 16.

October 12 Round of 16	Unión San Felipe (Chile)	4–2	(Ecuador) LDU Quito	Estadio Santa Laura, Santiago
20:15 (UTC−4)	Distéfano 24'; Vildozo 27', 67'; Toloza 86'	Report	Barcos 36' (pen.); Luna 61'	Referee: Rafael Furchi (Argentina)

October 19 Round of 16	LDU Quito (Ecuador)	6–1	(Chile) Unión San Felipe	Estadio Casa Blanca, Quito
20:00 (UTC−5)	Cheme 21'; Barcos 24' (pen.), 73'; Guagua 51'; Luna 59'; Salgueiro 66'	Report	Vildozo 38'	Referee: Wilmar Roldán (Colombia)

November 2 Quarterfinals	Newell's Old Boys (Argentina)	0–0	(Ecuador) LDU Quito	Estadio Marcelo Bielsa, Rosario
21:15 (UTC−3)		Report		Referee: Darío Ubriaco (Uruguay)

November 10 Quarterfinals	LDU Quito (Ecuador)	1–0	(Argentina) Newell's Old Boys	Estadio Casa Blanca, Quito
21:20 (UTC−5)	W. Calderón 81'	Report		Referee: Óscar Ruiz (Colombia)

November 18 Semifinals	LDU Quito (Ecuador)	3–2	(Argentina) Independiente	Estadio Casa Blanca, Quito
19:30 (UTC−5)	Salgueiro 45'; Bolaños 49'; Reasco 57'	Report	Silvera 58'; Mareque 64'	Referee: Roberto Silvera (Uruguay)

November 25 Semifinals	Independiente (Argentina)	2–1	(Ecuador) LDU Quito	Estadio Libertadores de América, Avellaneda
21:30 (UTC−3)	Parra 27'; Fredes 46'	Report	Salgueiro 45+1'	Referee: Enrique Osses (Chile)

== Player statistics ==
Num	Pos	Player	Serie A				Recopa Sudamericana				Copa Suruga Bank				Copa Sudamericana				Total			
Num	Pos	Player	App	Goal	Yellow card	Red card	App	Goal	Yellow card	Red card	App	Goal	Yellow card	Red card	App	Goal	Yellow card	Red card	App	Goal	Yellow card	Red card
1	GK	José Francisco Cevallos	8		1	1	1		1						6		1		15		3	1
2	DF	Norberto Araujo	31		7		2				1				4				38		7	
3	DF	Renán Calle	7			2					1								8			2
4	MF	Ulises de la Cruz	41	6	6	1	1				1				6				49	6	6	1
5	MF	Paúl Ambrosi	11		1		2		1										13		2	
6	DF	Jorge Guagua	36	3	9	1	2		1		1		1		6	1	3		45	4	14	1
7	MF	Miler Bolaños	24	9	5	2	1				1				5	1	1		31	10	6	2
8	MF	Patricio Urrutia	23	1	5	2	2				1	1			5		2		31	2	7	2
9	FW	Walter Calderón	13	1	1										3	1			16	2	1	
10	MF	Christian Lara	34	3	5	1	2		1		1				2				39	3	6	1
11	FW	Franklin Salas	5	2															5	2		
12	DF	Gabriel Espinosa	5				1												6			
13	DF	Néicer Reasco	39	4	4	1	2				1				6	1	2		48	5	6	1
14	DF	Diego Calderón	36	1	8	1	2		1		1				6				45	1	9	1
15	MF	William Araujo	31	1	3		2		1		1				5		1		39	1	5	
16	FW	Hernán Barcos	32	22	6		2	2			1	1			6	3	1		41	28	7	
17	MF	Enrique Gámez	23		4						1				3				27		4	
18	FW	Víctor Estupiñán	6	1	2	1													6	1	2	1
19	FW	Juan Manuel Salgueiro	39	8	4	1	2		1		1				6	3	1		48	11	6	1
20	FW	Carlos Luna	21	6	4		2				1		1		5	2	2		29	8	7	
21	MF	Ángel Cheme	33	2	2		1				1				6	1	2		41	3	4	
22	GK	Alexander Domínguez	38		4		1				1								40		4	
23	DF	Carlos Espínola	21		1	1									4				25		1	1
24	DF	José Valencia	7		1														7		1	
26	MF	Galo Corozo	3																3			
28	MF	Pedro Romo	2																2			
50	MF	Nelson Martínez	14	1	3														14	1	3	
51	MF	Diego Quintanilla	2																2			
52	FW	José Pabón	1																1			
53	FW	Joao Plata	7	1	2														7	1	2	
54	MF	Marlon Ganchozo	25		3														25		3	
8	MF	Édison Méndez	15	6	7														15	6	7	
20	MF	Enrique Vera	9	1	2	2													9	1	2	2
Totals			–	79	100	17	–	2	7	0	–	2	2	0	–	13	16	0	–	96	125	17

== See also ==
- 2010 in Ecuadorian football
