= 2010 Suruga Bank Championship =

Tokyo	LDU Quito
(Japan)	(Ecuador)
2	2
- F.C. Tokyo won 4–3 on penalties
- Date: August 4, 2010
- Venue: National Stadium, Tokyo
- Referee: Stuart Attwell (England)
- Attendance: 19,423
- Weather: Fine; 29.3°C

The 2010 Suruga Bank Championship (Japanese: スルガ銀行チャンピオンシップ2010; Spanish: Copa Suruga Bank 2010) was the third edition of the match between the winners of the previous season's J. League Cup and the Copa Sudamericana. It was contested by the 2009 J. League Cup winner Tokyo and the 2009 Copa Sudamericana champion Ecuadorian club LDU Quito.

== Qualified teams ==
Team	Qualification
(Japan) Tokyo	2009 J. League Cup champion
(Ecuador) LDU Quito	2009 Copa Sudamericana champion

== Rules ==
The match was played normally according to the rules of the games, with a penalty shootout if the score was tied at the end of regulation. The official match ball was the Adidas Jabulani, the same used in the 2010 FIFA World Cup. Each team was allowed to bring a squad of 18 players for the match and used seven squad changes during the match. The winner of the match received the trophy plus $200,000; the runner-up earned $60,000.

== Match details ==
August 4, 2010
19:00 (UTC+9)

Tokyo (Japan)	2–2	(Ecuador) LDU Quito
Hirayama 34'; Oguro 90+1'	Report	Barcos 29'; Urrutia 63' (pen.)
Penalties
Oguro (penalty scored); Matsushita (penalty scored); Shigematsu (penalty missed); Konno (penalty scored); Kajiyama (penalty scored)	4–3	(penalty missed) Urrutia; (penalty scored) de la Cruz; (penalty scored) Lara; (penalty missed) Luna; (penalty scored) Calle

National Stadium, Tokyo
Attendance: 19,423
Referee: Stuart Attwell (England)

Tokyo	LDU Quito

TOKYO:
GK	20	(Japan) Shuichi Gonda
DF	33	(Japan) Kenta Mukuhara	(yellow card) 62'	(substituted off) 81'
DF	17	(South Korea) Kim Young Gwon
DF	6	(Japan) Yasuyuki Konno (c)
DF	14	(Japan) Hokuto Nakamura
MF	3	(Japan) Masato Morishige		(substituted off) 46'
MF	27	(Japan) Sotan Tanabe		(substituted off) 64'
MF	19	(Japan) Yohei Otake		(substituted off) 46'
MF	18	(Japan) Naohiro Ishikawa		(substituted off) 77'
FW	16	(Brazil) Ricardinho		(substituted off) 57'
FW	13	(Japan) Sōta Hirayama
Substitutes:
GK	1	(Japan) Hitoshi Shiota
DF	8	(Japan) Toshihiro Matsushita		(substituted on) 81'
MF	30	(South Korea) Seo Yong-Duk		(substituted on) 64'
MF	22	(Japan) Naotake Hanyu		(substituted on) 46'
MF	10	(Japan) Yōhei Kajiyama		(substituted on) 46'
FW	39	(Japan) Masashi Oguro		(substituted on) 57'
FW	24	(Japan) Kentaro Shigematsu		(substituted on) 77'
Manager:
(Japan) Hiroshi Jofuku

LDU QUITO:
GK	22	(Ecuador) Alexander Domínguez
DF	13	(Ecuador) Néicer Reasco (c)		(substituted off) 81'
DF	2	(Argentina) Norberto Araujo
DF	6	(Ecuador) Jorge Guagua	(yellow card) 40'
DF	21	(Ecuador) Gonzalo Chila		(substituted off) 88'
DF	14	(Ecuador) Diego Calderón
MF	4	(Ecuador) Ulises de la Cruz
MF	8	(Ecuador) Patricio Urrutia
MF	7	(Ecuador) Miller Bolaños		(substituted off) 46'
FW	19	(Uruguay) Juan Manuel Salgueiro		(substituted off) 71'
FW	16	(Argentina) Hernán Barcos		(substituted off) 85'
Substitutes:
GK	1	(Ecuador) José Francisco Cevallos
DF	23	(Paraguay) Carlos Espínola
DF	3	(Ecuador) Renán Calle		(substituted on) 88'
DF	17	(Ecuador) Enrique Gámez		(substituted on) 81'
MF	15	(Ecuador) William Araujo		(substituted on) 71'
MF	10	(Ecuador) Christian Lara		(substituted on) 85'
FW	20	(Argentina) Carlos Luna	(yellow card) 50'	(substituted on) 46'
Manager:
(Argentina) Edgardo Bauza

Assistant referees:
(Singapore) Jeffrey Goh
(Singapore) Haja Maidin
Fourth official:
(Japan) Hiroyoshi Takayama

Suruga Bank Championship
2010 Champion

Tokyo
First Title
