= 2010 Recopa Sudamericana =

- Event: Recopa Sudamericana
LDU Quito	Estudiantes (LP)
(Ecuador)	(Argentina)
2	1
- LDU Quito won 4–1 on points

First leg
LDU Quito	Estudiantes (LP)
2	1
- Date: August 25, 2010
- Venue: Estadio Casa Blanca, Quito
- Referee: Roberto Silvera (Uruguay)
- Attendance: 30,000

Second leg
Estudiantes (LP)	LDU Quito
0	0
- Date: September 8, 2010
- Venue: Estadio Centenario, Quilmes
- Referee: Carlos Simon (Brazil)
- Attendance: 24,000

The 2010 Recopa Sudamericana de Clubes was a two-legged tie that determined the winner of the Recopa Sudamericana, an annual football match between the winners of the previous season's Copa Libertadores and Copa Sudamericana competitions. It was contested between Argentine club Estudiantes de La Plata and LDU Quito from Ecuador. The first leg was played on August 25 in Quito, while the second leg was played in Quilmes due to Estadio Ciudad de La Plata was undergoing renovations. Estudiantes participated in the Recopa for their first time ever, having qualified by winning the 2009 Copa Libertadores.

On the other hand, LDU Quito was the defending champion and making their second consecutive appearance having won the 2009 Copa Sudamericana. LDU Quito successfully defended their title after winning the first leg 2–1 and drawing the second leg 0–0. They became the third team to win back-to-back Recopa Sudamericanas.

As a curious fact, in June 2020 Estudiantes de La Plata filled a claim with Conmebol, requesting to be crowned champion of the 2010 edition. In the complaint, Estudiantes alleged that LDU player Gonzalo Chila should have not been registered to play the final, as he had falsified his identity document. Nevertheless, Conmebol did not take the claim into account and LDU was confirmed as champion.

== Qualified teams ==
Team	Previous finals app.
(Ecuador) LDU Quito	**2009**
(Argentina) Estudiantes (LP)	None

Bold indicates winning years

== Rules ==
The Recopa Sudamericana was played over two legs; home and away. The team that qualified via the Copa Libertadores plays the second leg at home. The team that accumulates the most points —three for a win, one for a draw, zero for a loss— after the two legs is crowned the champion. The away-goals rule is not used. Should the two teams be tied on points after regulation of the second leg, the team with the best goal difference wins. If the two teams have equal goal difference, extra time is used. The extra time consists of two 15-minute halves. If the tie is still not broken, a penalty shoot-out ensues according to the Laws of the Game.

== Background ==
Estudiantes qualified to the Recopa Sudamericana by winning the 2009 Copa Libertadores. It was their fourth Copa Libertadores title and first in 39 years, which they achieved by defeating Brazilian club Cruzeiro 4–1 on points. Liga de Quito are the reigning title holders of the competition, having won the 2009 edition of this competition after beating Internacional on both legs of the Recopa, their first title of the competition. The club earned the right to defend the trophy after winning the 2009 Copa Sudamericana, beating Fluminense in a rematch of the 2008 Copa Libertadores Finals (which LDU Quito also won). The victory was the club's first ever title in the competition and third international title ever (as well as their nation's).

Prior to the 2010 Recopa, Estudiantes and LDU Quito had previously met two times in South American competition. The first meeting between the two sides took place in the Round of 16 of the 2008 Copa Libertadores; LDU Quito won the first match 2–0 at the Estadio Casa Blanca in Quito, and lost 2–1 at the Estadio Ciudad de La Plata. Luis Bolaños's 25th-minute goal in the second match gave LDU Quito a favorable goal difference, which eliminated Estudiantes. LDU Quito subsequently went on to win the competition. Estudiantes are entering the Recopa for their first time ever. They are the seventh Argentine club to dispute this title; the first to do so was Racing in 1989. This will be LDU Quito's second consecutive appearance (as well as their second all-time appearance) of the Recopa Sudamericana. They are the only side from Ecuador to participate in the Recopa Sudamericana.

== Venues ==
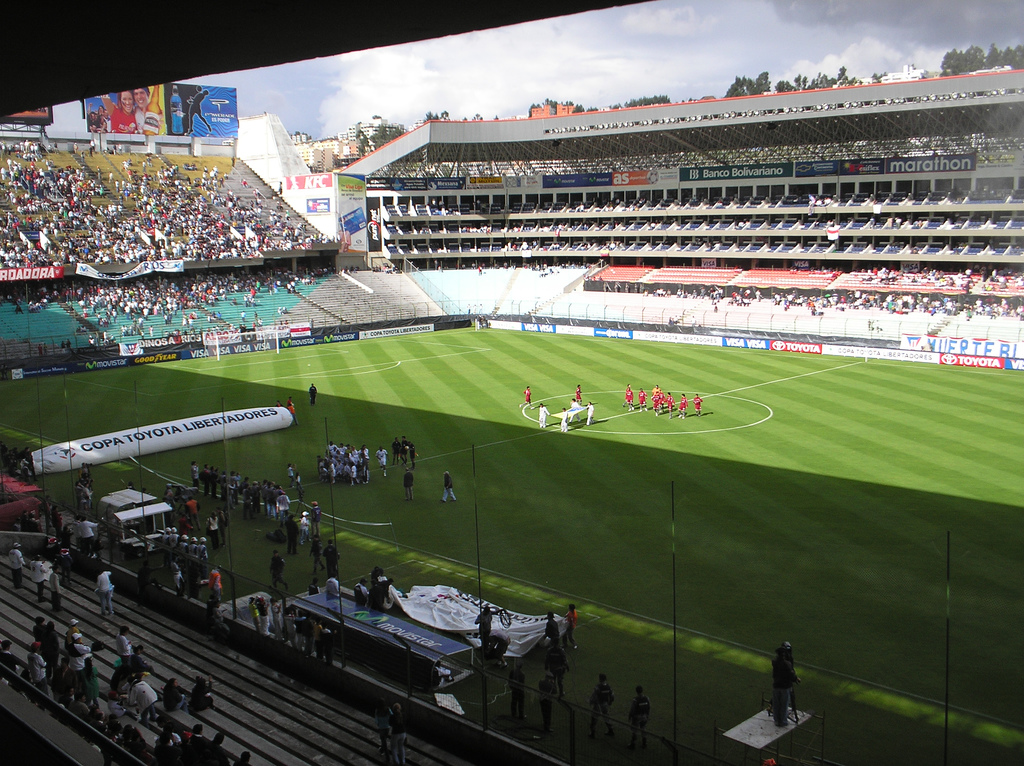
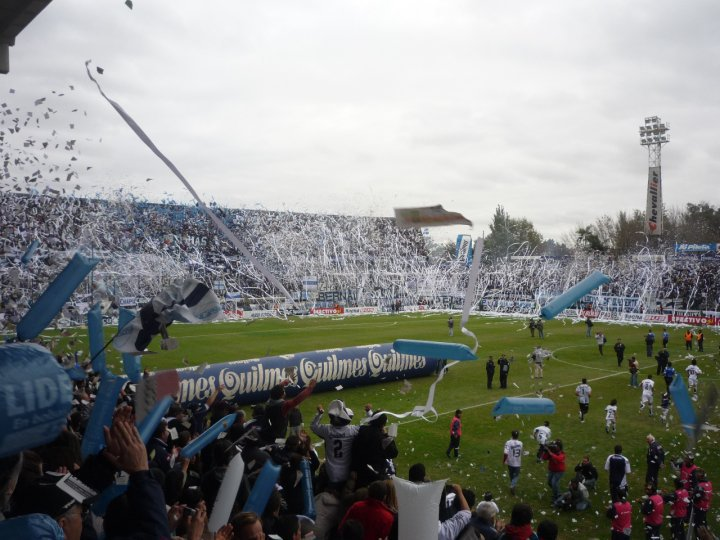
Estadio Casa Blanca (left) and Centenario of Quilmes, venues of the finals

The venues for this final series were Estadio Casa Blanca, located in Quito, and Estadio Centenario Dr. José Luis Meiszner in Quilmes. The Estadio Casa Blanca was built between 1995 and 1997, and it hosted its first match on March 6, 1997, in a game between LDU Quito and Atlético Mineiro of Belo Horizonte. Prior to this match, the stadium had hosted a final series match for the Copa Libertadores in 2008, the Recopa Sudamericana in 2009 as well as the 2009 final of the Copa Sudamericana. With a capacity of 55,400, it was the largest stadium in Quito, and the second largest in Ecuador after the Estadio Monumental Banco Pichincha in Guayaquil.

On the other hand, Estadio Centenario Dr. José Luis Meiszner hosted the second leg. Ñocated in the Quilmes district and property of Quilmes Atlético Club, it was built in 1995 to commemorate the club's centenary in 1997 (which is also why the stadium bears the name "Centenario"). It underwent a renovation in 1998 to increase its capacity. With the 2010 Recopa final, Estadio Centenario hosted an international final series match for the first time.

== Officials ==
The referees for the 2010 Recopa Sudamericana were Roberto Silvera of Uruguay and Carlos Simon of Brazil. Silvera had been a referee since 2003 and had officiated several CONMEBOL club competitions including a final series match of the 2006 and 2009 Copa Sudamericana.

Simon became a referee in Brazil in 1993 and for the FIFA in 1997. He participated in the 2000 Olympic Games, the 2002, 2006 and 2010 FIFA World Cup Qualifying Tournaments, the 2002, 2006, and 2010 FIFA World Cup and every Copa Libertadores competition since 2000. He also officiated the finals of the Campeonato Brasileiro Série A four times (1998, 1999, 2001 and 2002), the Copa do Brasil three times (2000, 2003 and 2004).

== Match details ==
=== First leg ===
2010 Recopa Sudamericana
August 25, 2010
20:15 (UTC-5)
First leg

LDU Quito (Ecuador)	2–1	(Argentina) Estudiantes LP
Barcos 8', 17'	Report	Rojo 12'

Estadio Casa Blanca, Quito
Attendance: 30,000
Referee: Roberto Silvera (Uruguay)

**LDU Quito**	**Estudiantes LP**

GK	22	(Ecuador) Alexander Domínguez
DF	5	(Ecuador) Paúl Ambrosi	(substituted off) 81'
DF	6	(Ecuador) Jorge Guagua	(yellow card) 81'
DF	13	(Ecuador) Néicer Reasco (c)
DF	2	(Argentina) Norberto Araujo
MF	14	(Ecuador) Diego Calderón
MF	10	(Ecuador) Christian Lara	(yellow card) 56' (substituted off) 85'
MF	8	(Ecuador) Patricio Urrutia
MF	15	(Ecuador) William Araujo
FW	19	(Uruguay) Juan Manuel Salgueiro	(yellow card) 30' (substituted off) 65'
FW	16	(Argentina) Hernán Barcos
Substitutes:
GK	1	(Ecuador) José Francisco Cevallos
DF	23	(Paraguay) Carlos Espínola
MF	17	(Ecuador) Enrique Gámez
MF	12	(Ecuador) Gabriel Espinosa
MF	7	(Ecuador) Miller Bolaños	(substituted on) 65'
MF	21	(Ecuador) Gonzalo Chila	(substituted on) 81'
FW	20	(Argentina) Carlos Luna	(substituted on) 85'
Manager:
(Argentina) Edgardo Bauza

GK	12	(Argentina) César Taborda
DF	3	(Argentina) Facundo Roncaglia
DF	16	(Argentina) Germán Ré	(yellow card) 76'
DF	14	(Argentina) Gabriel Mercado
DF	17	(Argentina) Federico Fernández
DF	6	(Argentina) Marcos Rojo
MF	11	(Argentina) Juan Sebastián Verón (c)
MF	22	(Argentina) Rodrigo Braña	(yellow card) 38'
MF	23	(Argentina) Leandro Benítez	(yellow card) 32' (substituted off) 82'
MF	7	(Argentina) Enzo Pérez
FW	20	(Argentina) Leandro González	(substituted off) 66'
Substitutes:
GK	25	(Argentina) Agustín Silva
DF	4	(Argentina) Raúl Iberbia
MF	5	(Argentina) Matías Sánchez	(substituted on) 82' (substituted off) 90'
MF	13	(Argentina) Michael Hoyos	(substituted on) 90'
MF	19	(Argentina) Gabriel Peñalba
MF	8	(Argentina) Juan Pablo Pereyra
FW	21	(Argentina) Diego Auzqui	(substituted on) 66'
Manager:
(Argentina) Alejandro Sabella

Assistant referees:
(Uruguay) Carlos Pastorino
(Uruguay) Miguel Ángel Nievas
Fourth official:
(Uruguay) Líber Prudente

=== Second leg ===
September 8, 2010
21:15 (UTC-3)
Second leg

Estudiantes LP (Argentina)	0–0	(Ecuador) LDU Quito
	Report

Estadio Centenario, Quilmes
Attendance: 24,000
Referee: Carlos Simon (Brazil)

**Estudiantes LP**	**LDU Quito**

GK	12	(Argentina) César Taborda
DF	16	(Argentina) Germán Ré	(substituted off) 84'
DF	14	(Argentina) Gabriel Mercado
DF	17	(Argentina) Federico Fernández
DF	6	(Argentina) Marcos Rojo	(yellow card) 20'
MF	11	(Argentina) Juan Sebastián Verón (c)
MF	22	(Argentina) Rodrigo Braña
MF	23	(Argentina) Leandro Benítez	(substituted off) 70'
MF	7	(Argentina) Enzo Pérez
FW	20	(Argentina) Leandro González
FW	10	(Argentina) Gastón Fernández	(substituted off) 46'
Substitutes:
GK	1	(Argentina) Gerónimo Rulli
DF	3	(Argentina) Facundo Roncaglia
MF	8	(Argentina) Juan Pablo Pereyra	(substituted on) 70'
MF	19	(Argentina) Gabriel Peñalba	(substituted on) 84'
MF	15	(Argentina) Darío Stefanatto
MF	18	(Argentina) Maximiliano Núñez
FW	21	(Argentina) Diego Auzqui	(substituted on) 46'
Manager:
(Argentina) Alejandro Sabella

GK	1	(Ecuador) José Francisco Cevallos	(yellow card) 63'
DF	5	(Ecuador) Paúl Ambrosi	(yellow card) 90'
DF	6	(Ecuador) Jorge Guagua
DF	4	(Ecuador) Ulises de la Cruz
DF	13	(Ecuador) Néicer Reasco (c)
DF	2	(Argentina) Norberto Araujo
MF	14	(Ecuador) Diego Calderón	(yellow card) 24'
MF	8	(Ecuador) Patricio Urrutia
MF	15	(Ecuador) William Araujo	(yellow card) 10' (substituted off) 90+2'
FW	16	(Argentina) Hernán Barcos
FW	20	(Argentina) Carlos Luna	(substituted off) 72'
Substitutes:
GK	25	(Ecuador) Manuel Mendoza
DF	3	(Ecuador) Renán Calle
MF	10	(Ecuador) Christian Lara	(substituted on) 72' (substituted off) 90+5'
MF	12	(Ecuador) Gabriel Espinosa	(substituted on) 90+2'
MF	17	(Ecuador) Enrique Gámez
MF	21	(Ecuador) Gonzalo Chila
FW	19	(Uruguay) Juan Manuel Salgueiro	(substituted on) 90+5'
Manager:
(Argentina) Edgardo Bauza

Man of the Match:
(Argentina) Norberto Araujo (LDU Quito)
Assistant referees:
(Brazil) Altermir Hausmann
(Brazil) Roberto Braatz
Fourth official:
(Brazil) Paulo Oliveira
