= 2010 in Ecuadorian football =

Football in Ecuador
- Season: 2010

The 2010 season is the 88th season of competitive football in Ecuador.

== National leagues ==
=== Serie A ===
- Champion: LDU Quito (10th title)
  - Runner-up: Emelec
- International cup qualifiers:
  - 2010 Copa Sudamericana: Emelec, Barcelona, Deportivo Quito
  - 2011 Copa Libertadores: LDU Quito, Emelec, Deportivo Quito
  - 2011 Copa Sudamericana: LDU Quito
- Relegated: Universidad Católica, Macará

=== Serie B ===
- Winner: LDU Loja (1st title)
  - Runner-up: Imbabura
- Promoted: LDU Loja, Imbabura
- Relegated: UT Equinoccial, Municipal Cañar

=== Segunda Categoria ===
- Winner: Valle del Chota (1st title)
  - Runner-up: Deportivo Quevedo
- Promoted: Valle del Chota, Deportivo Quevedo

== Clubs in international competitions ==
Team	2010 Copa Libertadores	2010 Copa Sudamericana	2010 Recopa Sudamericana	2010 Copa Suruga Bank
Barcelona	N/A	Eliminated in the Second Stage	N/A	N/A
Deportivo Cuenca	Eliminated in the Second Stage	N/A	N/A	N/A
Deportivo Quito	Eliminated in the Second Stage	Eliminated in the First Stage	N/A	N/A
Emelec	Eliminated in the Second Stage	Eliminated in the Round of 16	N/A	N/A
LDU Quito	N/A	Eliminated in the Semifinals	Champion	Runner-up

== National teams ==
=== Senior team ===
The senior team will play a number of friendlies in 2010 in preparation for the 2011 Copa América in Argentina.

May 7 Friendly	Mexico	0–0	Ecuador	East Rutherford, New Jersey, United States
21:00 (UTC-4)		ESPN Report		Stadium: Meadowlands Stadium; Attendance: 77,507; Referee: Steven Depiero (Canada)

May 11 Friendly (Unofficial)	Philadelphia Union (United States)	1–1	Ecuador	Chester, Pennsylvania, United States
11:30 (UTC-4)	Torres 23'	Article	Rojas 20'	Stadium: PPL Park; Attendance: Closed Door

May 16 Friendly	South Korea	2–0	Ecuador	Seoul, South Korea
19:00 (UTC+9)	Lee Seung-Ryul 70'; Lee Chung-Yong 84'	ESPN Report		Stadium: Seoul World Cup Stadium; Attendance: 65,000; Referee: Porached Wongkamdee (Thailand)

September 4 Friendly	Mexico	1–2	Ecuador	Zapopan, Mexico
20:00 (UTC-5)	Checa 40' (o.g.)	ESPN Report	Benítez 1'; Ayoví 20'	Stadium: Estadio Omnilife; Attendance: 17,500; Referee: Wálter Quesada (Costa Rica)

September 7 Friendly	Venezuela	1–0	Ecuador	Barquisimeto, Venezuela
20:30 UTC-4:30	Fedor 85'			Stadium: Estadio Metropolitano de Fútbol de Lara; Attendance: 30,000

October 8 Friendly	Ecuador	0–1	Colombia	Harrison, New Jersey, United States
			Falcao 87'	Stadium: Red Bull Arena; Referee: Andrew Chapin (United States)

October 12 Friendly	Ecuador	2–2	Poland	Montreal, Quebec, Canada
	Benítez 32', 78'		Smolarek 61'; Obraniak 70'	Stadium: Saputo Stadium

November 17 Friendly	Ecuador	4–1	Venezuela	Quito, Ecuador
20:00 (UTC-5)	Benítez 2', 4'; Ayoví 45' (pen.), 47'	Report	Maldonado 48'	Stadium: Estadio Olímpico Atahualpa

=== Under-20 team ===
The under-20 team played two friendlies against Colombia in preparation for the 2011 South American Youth Championship.

April 24 Friendly	Ecuador	1–1	Colombia	Ibarra, Ecuador
17:00 (UTC-5)	Morales ?'	Article	Castillo 55'	Stadium: Estadio Olímpico; Referee: Diego Lara (Ecuador)

April 26 Friendly	Colombia	3–1	Ecuador	Pasto, Colombia
(UTC-5)	Viáfara ?'; Castillo ?'; Espinoza ?' (o.g.)	Article	Ochoa ?' (pen.)	Stadium: Estadio Departamental Libertad

=== Under-16 team ===
The under-16 team participated in the 2010 South American Games in Medellín. They finished the tournament in second place behind Colombia. Luis Batioja was the tournament's topscorer with eight goals.

March 22 Preliminary Round	Colombia	1–1	Ecuador	Envigado
18:00 (UTC-5)	Delgado 14'		Batioja 8'	Stadium: Estadio Envigado; Attendance: 11,000; Referee: Quintana (Paraguay)

March 24 Preliminary Round	Ecuador	2–0	Paraguay	Itagüí
15:30 (UTC-5)	Batioja 60'; Sornoza 73'			Stadium: Estadio Ditaries Itagüí; Attendance: 500; Referee: Gambetta (Peru)

March 26 Preliminary Round	Ecuador	7–1	Bolivia	Itagüí
14:00 (UTC-5)	Sornoza 19'; Batioja 35', 45', 61', 88', 89'; Uchuari 62'		Silva 86'	Stadium: Estadio Ditaries Itagüí; Attendance: 1,500; Referee: Gamboa (Chile)

March 28 Final	Colombia	2–1	Ecuador	Envigado
20:00 (UTC-5)	Delgado 76'; Palomeque 90+2'		Batioja 32'	Stadium: Estadio Envigado; Attendance: 10,000; Referee: Quintana (Paraguay)
