= Pabón =

Pabón is a Spanish surname. Notable people with the surname include:

- Dorlan Pabón (born 1988), Colombian footballer
- José Pabón (born 1991), Ecuadorian footballer
- Marian Pabón (born c. 1958), Puerto Rican actress
- Mildred Pabón (born 1957), Puerto Rican jurist
- Miriam Pabón (born 1985), Puerto Rican model and beauty pageant winner
- Paola Pabón (born 1978), Ecuadorian politician
- Rosemberg Pabón (born 1947), Colombian political scientist
- Tony Pabón (1939–2014), American bandleader
