= Alex Cevallos =

Ecuadorian footballer (born 1967)

Personal information
- Full name: Alejandro Manuel Cevallos Villaciencio
- Date of birth: August 3, 1967 (age 59)
- Place of birth: Ancón, Ecuador
- Height: 1.81 m (5 ft 11 in)
- Position: Goalkeeper

Senior career*
Years	Team	Apps	(Gls)
1985	9 de Octubre		
1986–1993	Filanbanco		
1993–1998	Emelec		
1999	Audaz Octubrino	21	(0)
2000	Emelec	8	(0)
2001–2002	El Nacional	11	(0)
2003	Deportivo Cuenca	3	(0)

International career
1988–1996	Ecuador	23	(0)
- * Club domestic league appearances and goals as of April 2008

Alejandro Manuel "Álex" Cevallos Villaciencio (born August 3, 1967) is a retired Ecuadorian football goalkeeper that played most of his career for Emelec and played for the Ecuador national football team. He is now a goalkeeper coach.

== Club career ==
He was champion of Ecuador with Emelec in 1993 and 1994.

== Personal life ==
He is the older brother of José Francisco Cevallos, arguably Ecuador's best ever goalkeeper.
