= Ricardo Delgado =

Ricardo Delgado may refer to:

- Ricardo Delgado (comics), film and comic book artist
- Ricardo Delgado (boxer) (born 1947), boxer from Mexico
- Ricardo Delgado (Colombian footballer) (born 1994), Colombian football attacking midfielder
- Ricardo Delgado (Luxembourgian footballer) (born 1994), Luxembourgian football centre-back
