= Catalina Ontaneda =

Ecuadorian sportsperson

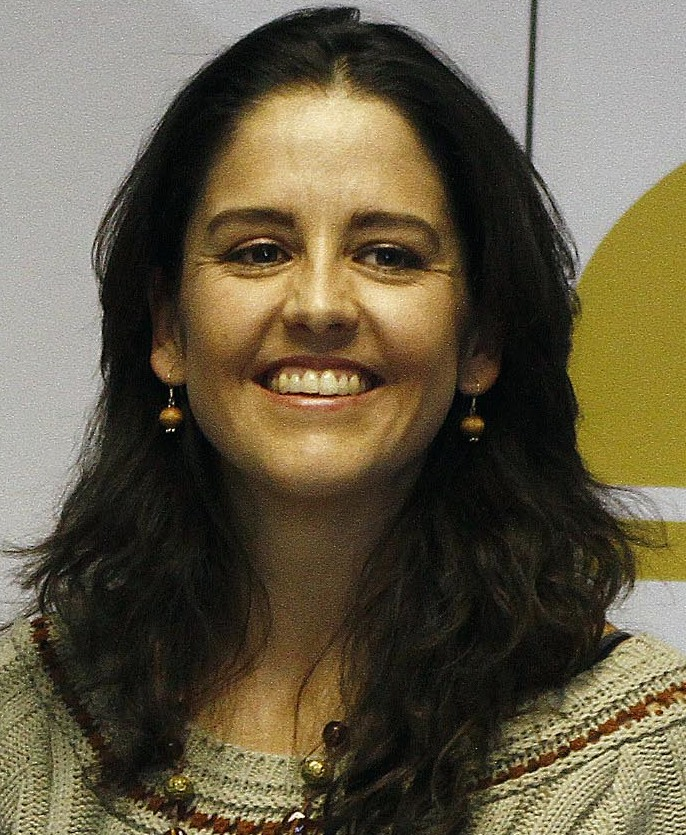
- Minister in 2015
- Born: Catalina Ontaneda Vivar c. 1977
- Occupations: sportsperson and minister
- Known for: Minister for Sport
- Predecessor: José Francisco Cevallos

Catalina Ontaneda Vivar (born c.1977) is an Ecuadorian sportsperson who became the Minister of Sport. She later set out to cycle to Canada.

== Biography ==
Ontaneda is from Loja, and was born around 1977. She graduated from the Catholic University in Quito with a degree in economics.

Ontaneda is a keen sportswoman, taking part in several sports. In 1990, she competed in BMX, and in 1992 she was chosen to join Pichincha's basketball team. It was her ability in soccer that gained her a scholarship to East Tennessee State University. In 2011 she was in the Galápagos Islands competing in a triathlon. Ontaneda has a Master of Business Administration degree, and a diploma in adventure sports from Thompson Rivers University. She was the manager of a high performance sports center.

She was appointed as the Minister of Sport by President Rafael Correa. There were ten other ministerial appointments in April 2015 which the President said would be last of his appointments until the end of his presidency. She was introduced as the new minister by Cecilia Vaca Jones who was the Coordinating Minister for Social Development. The previous minister was the former goalkeeper José Francisco Cevallos.

Mountain climber Paulina Aulestia's success at climbing Everest was recognised by Ontaneda when she was the Minister of Sport. Aulestia received $60,000 to fund her attempt, and she thanked Ontaneda for her support.

In November 2021 Ontaneda set out on a two-year bike ride that she planned to take to Canada. The following year, she had to stop her journey in Managua in Nicaragua. She left to attend her grandmother's funeral, but she planned to return to her bike and complete the journey.
