= José Cevallos (footballer, born 1971) =

Ecuadorian footballer

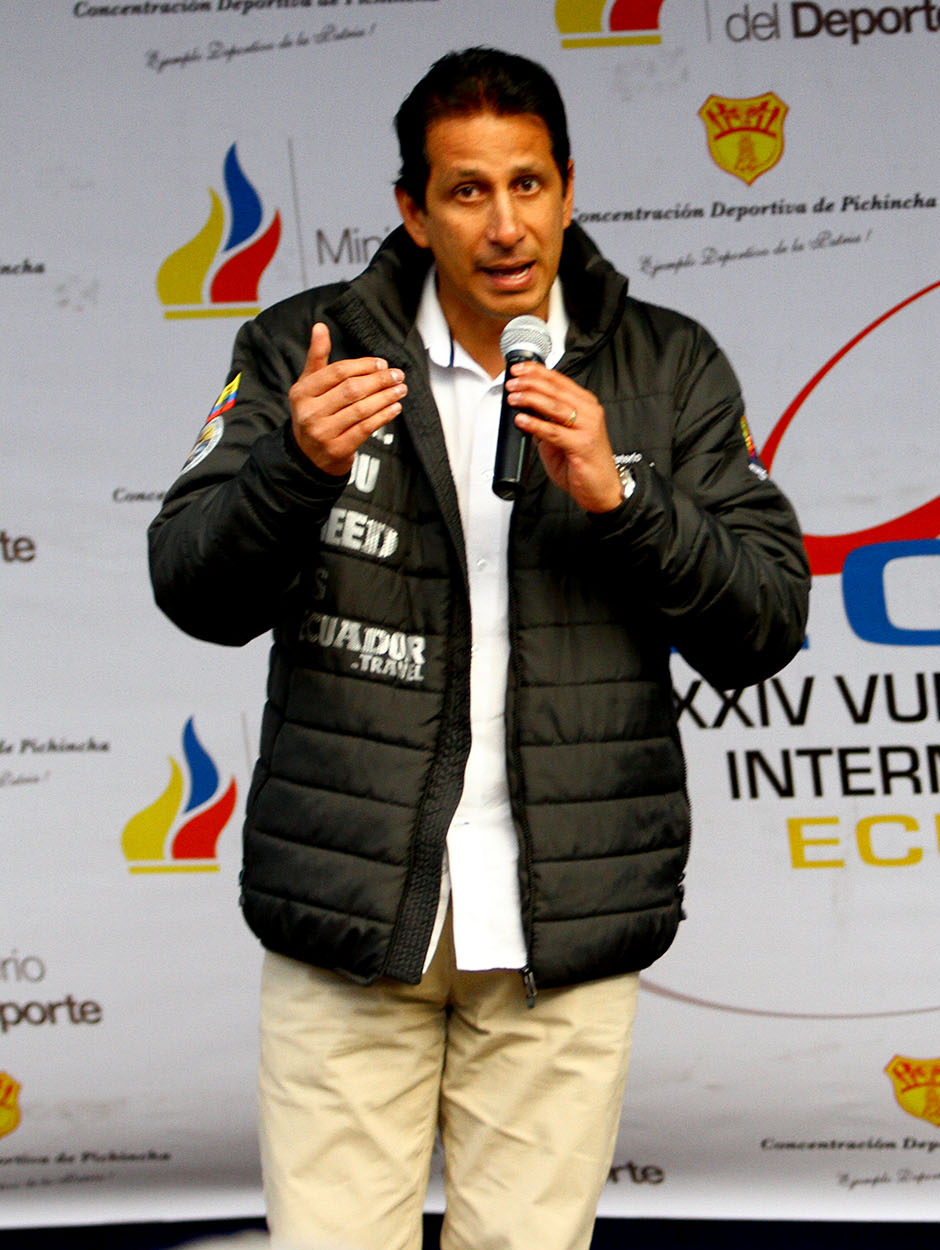
- Cevallos in 2014

Personal information
- Full name: José Francisco Cevallos Villavicencio
- Date of birth: April 17, 1971 (age 55)
- Place of birth: Ancón, Guayas, Ecuador
- Height: 1.82 m (6 ft 0 in)
- Position: Goalkeeper

Youth career
- 1985–1989: Molinera

Senior career*
Years	Team	Apps	(Gls)
1990–2006	Barcelona SC	380	(0)
2005	→ Once Caldas (loan)	11	(0)
2007	Deportivo Azogues	40	(0)
2008–2011	LDU Quito	48	(0)
Total		538	(0)

International career
1994–2010	Ecuador	89	(0)
- * Club domestic league appearances and goals

José Francisco Cevallos Villavicencio (born April 17, 1971) is an Ecuadorian former football goalkeeper, former Minister of Sports in Ecuador and former President of Barcelona, the football club where he started his professional career.

Nicknamed Las Manos del Ecuador (English: The hands of Ecuador), Cevallos is considered by many to be the greatest goalkeeper in the history of Ecuadorian football. He has won three national titles (1991, 1995, 1997) with Guayaquil based club Barcelona, with whom he has spent the majority of his professional career. As the goalkeeper for LDU Quito, he was a key figure in the team's 2008 Copa Libertadores title, where he saved three penalties in the deciding penalty shoot-out. That same year, he was voted as the Best Goalkeeper in South America by Montevideo based newspaper El País. As a member of the national team, he has participated in four Copa Américas and Ecuador's first World Cup participation. Having represented his national team 89 times, he is the highest capped goalkeeper in the history of the team.

== Club career ==
=== Barcelona ===
Cevallos was born in Ancón, Santa Elena Province. He joined the Guayaquil-based club in 1990, and spent most of his career there, playing over 400 league matches. He was a key figure in the club's 1991, 1995, and 1997 national titles, which gave the club their record 13 titles.

His most significant contribution to the club internationally came during the 1998 Copa Libertadores. In that season, Barcelona reached the finals for the second time in their history, but they would be the runner-up, again, after losing to Brazilian club Vasco da Gama.

=== Once Caldas and Deportivo Azogues ===
In 2005, he was loaned to play for Once Caldas in Colombia, where he did not enjoy major success and he just completed one season there. After returning to Barcelona briefly, he went to Deportivo Azogues where many believed that would be the end of his career. But at the club, kept his form and got back to being one of the best goalkeepers in Ecuador. Due to his outstanding performance in 2007, LDU Quito signed him for the following season.

=== LDU Quito ===
Cevallos joined the Quito club at the start of the 2008 season to help the club defend their 2007 title and to become an instrumental part of the clubs Copa Libertadores campaign. Again, as he did with Barcelona in 1998, Cevallos saw his role elevated to prominence. In the quarterfinals, LDU Quito eliminated Argentine club San Lorenzo by penalties, with Cevallos stopping a key shoot by Aureliano Torres. In the semifinals, he kept a clean sheet again Mexican club América in Quito, helping LDU Quito advance to their first final. After a 4−2 win in Quito during the first leg, Cevallos let the club's superior goal difference against Brazilian club Fluminense slip in the second leg, resulting in a decisive penalty shoot-out. Cevallos came out a hero in the end, blocking penalties by Darío Conca, Thiago Neves and Washington to give LDU Quito their first Copa Libertadores, which was also the first for the country. As a result of his performance in the tournament, he was elected as the best goalkeeper in South America and to the best eleven team for the tournament. IFFHS even ranked his as one of the top-ten goalkeepers around the world, at number 6. Initially slated to be with the club for a year, he extended his plans with the squad until 2010.

On May 16, 2011, he announced his retirement from professional football to make way for younger players.

== International career ==
During his first era with the Ecuador national team he was a participant at the 2002 FIFA World Cup and in Copa América 1995, 1997 with his brother, 1999, and 2001. He played 77 official games before announcing his retirement in 2004.

In 2008, he returned for the national team in an unofficial friendly match against LDU Quito to which he belonged. This was the first time that he played for Ecuador in four years. He played the first half of the 5–0 win until he was replaced by Espoli's Maximo Banguera.

Later he was called again to play 2010 FIFA World Cup qualification against Argentina and Colombia.

He was nicknamed by the Ecuadorian fans as "las manos del Ecuador" meaning "the hands of Ecuador" referring to his wonderful performances in the 2002 FIFA World Cup qualification.

== Political career ==
José Francisco Cevallos

Minister of Sports
- Incumbent
- Assumed office May 24, 2011
- President: Rafael Correa
- Preceded by: Sandra Vela
- Succeeded by: Catalina Ontaneda

Personal details
- Profession: Footballer

On May 23, 2011, Cevallos was picked to succeed Sandra Vela as the Minister of Sports in Ecuador. He assumed office the following day. He was succeeded by Catalina Ontaneda in 2015.

== Personal life ==
Cevallos' older brother Alex used to play professionally as a goalkeeper as well. His son José Francisco Jr. is also a footballer who plays for Juventus on loan from his father's old club.

He is also known for having a foundation that helps young kids, especially in football.

== Career statistics ==
Club performance			League		Cup		Continental		Total	
Season	Club	League	Apps	Goals	Apps	Goals	Apps	Goals	Apps	Goals
Ecuador			League		Cup		South America		Total	
2008	LDU Quito	Serie A	19	0	N/A		16	0	35	0
2009	LDU Quito	Serie A	17	0	N/A		5	0	22	0
2010	LDU Quito	Serie A	8	0	N/A		7	0	15	0
2011	LDU Quito	Serie A	4	0	N/A		0	0	4	0

== Honors ==
Barcelona S.C.

- Ecuadorian Serie A: 1991, 1995, 1997

LDU Quito

- Ecuadorian Serie A: 2010
- Copa Libertadores: 2008
- Recopa Sudamericana: 2009, 2010
- Copa Sudamericana: 2009

Ecuador

- Korea Cup: 1995
- Canada Cup: 1999
