= Patricio Urrutia =

Ecuadorian footballer (born 1977)

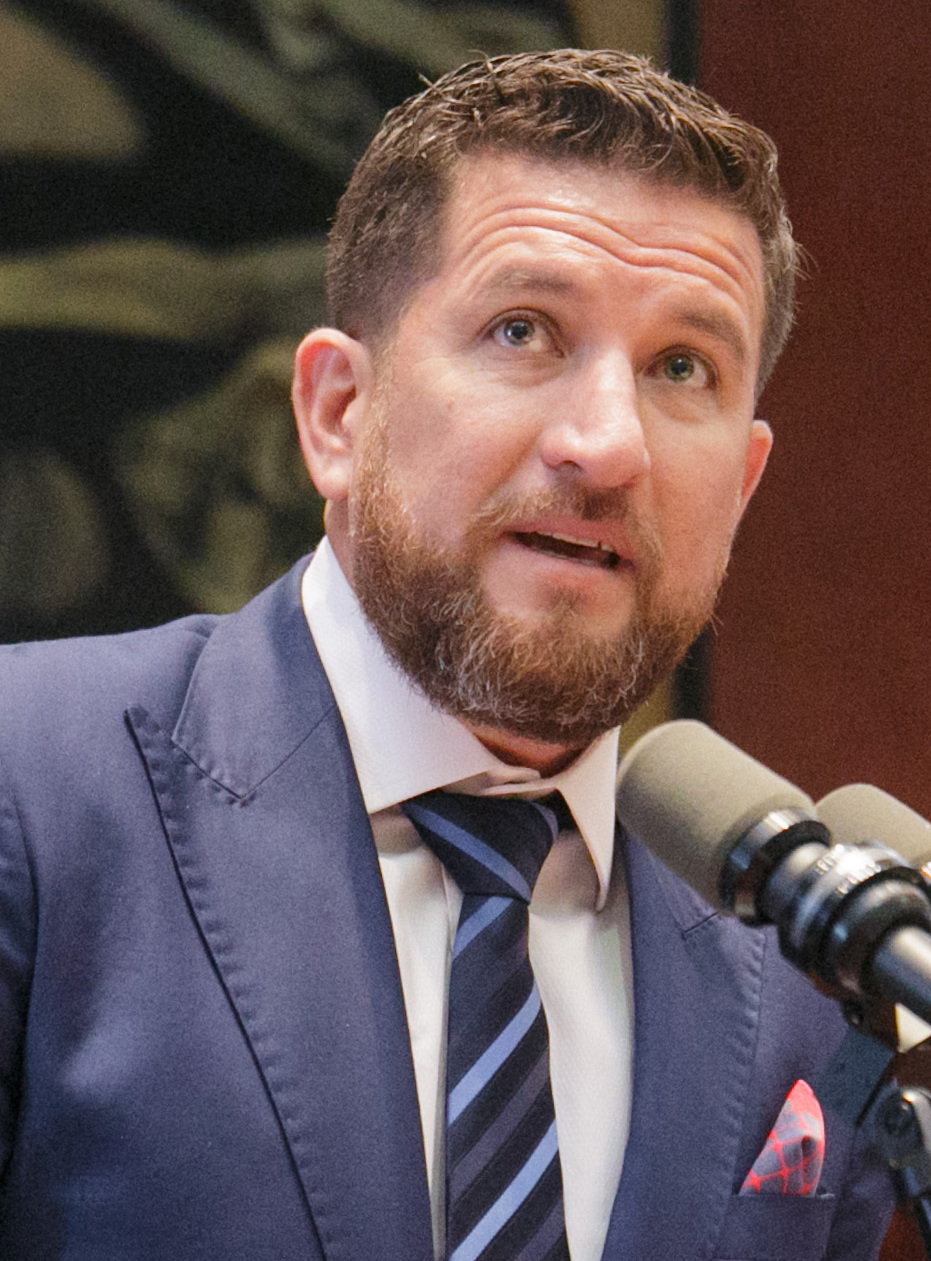
- Urrutia in 2018

Personal information
- Full name: Patricio Javier Urrutia Espinoza
- Date of birth: 15 October 1977 (age 49)
- Place of birth: Ventanas, Los Ríos, Ecuador
- Height: 1.78 m (5 ft 10 in)
- Position: Central midfielder

Senior career*
Years	Team	Apps	(Gls)
1994–1997	Barcelona SC	0	(0)
1997–1998	Calvi		
1998–1999	Técnico Universitario	30	(0)
1999–2002	Macará	79	(12)
2002	→ Barcelona SC (loan)	38	(2)
2003–2009	LDU Quito	232	(42)
2009	Fluminense	5	(0)
2010–2013	LDU Quito	75	(1)
Total		459	(57)

International career
2002–2009	Ecuador	27	(3)

Managerial career
- 2020–2022: Ecuador U17
- 2025: Delfín
- * Club domestic league appearances and goals

Patricio Javier Urrutia Espinoza (born 15 October 1977) is an Ecuadorian football manager and former player who played as a midfielder.

== Club career ==
=== Early career ===
Urrutia started playing football for local club Liga Deportiva Cantonal de Ventanas. His professional career began at Barcelona de Guayaquil in 1996, but he never got any playing time. He was later transferred to Calvi, also in Guayaquil, and again never saw playing time at the club. The following year, he was traded to Técnico Universitario in Ambato in 1998. For the Ambato club, he got significant played time, earning 30 caps in his first year. After a dry season in 1999, he was transferred to crosstown rival Macará. At the club, he was a significant part of the squad, earning 79 caps and scoring 12 goals in three seasons. In 2002, he was loaned back to Barcelona for a season, playing in 38 matches and scoring two goals before being transferred to LDU Quito.

=== LDU Quito ===
Urrutia joined LDU Quito in 2003. During his time at the club, he has become a star and a prominent figure in the line-up as the team captain. Domestically, he has helped bring in three national titles to the club (2003, 2005 A, 2007). Internationally, he has brought success to himself and the club. In the 2005 Copa Libertadores, he was a joint top-scorer with 13 other players. He has since become the team's all-time top-scorer in the tournament with 18 goals.

In 2008, he was a starting figure of the squad that won the 2008 Copa Libertadores, the first international title for the club and the country. During the campaign, he scored 7 goals, including the 4th in the first leg of the final, and the first penalty of the shootout in the second leg, and was voted the Most Valuable Player of the final.

=== Fluminense ===
Urrutia was expected to transfer to Brazilian club Fluminense. The club had been interested in Urrutia since the 2008 Copa Libertadores Final, but negotiations fell through back in 2008. The parties involved finally reach an agree for Patricio's transfer in August 2009. Pato travelled to Rio de Janeiro for medical exams, but he did not pass the medical tests because of inflammation on his right knee, which had recently been operated on. Fluminense, who at the time was in 19th position and in the relegation zone, wanted to use Pato's skills immediately. The approximate one-month recovery time prevented the team from incorporating Pato from the beginning. An initial decision was made to not sign Pato at that time, forcing him to stay with LDU Quito. However, on 26 August 2009, Urrutía signed a two-year contract with Fluminense after a second round of medical exams showed the recovery time for his knee was less than expected.

== International career ==
Urrutia was first called up to the national team on 17 November 2004, in a 2006 World Cup qualifying match against Brazil in Quito. He was chosen to be part of Ecuador's team in the World Cup games in Germany 2006. His appointment to the Ecuadorian squad for the 2006 FIFA World Cup raised a few eyebrows, as he had not made an appearance for them in months. He made his FIFA World Cup debut as a substitute for Agustín Delgado in the 2006 World Cup games against Poland and Costa Rica, where they won 2–0 and 3–0 respectively, securing a historic qualification to the round of sixteen. This was the best result yet for Ecuador in their World Cup history. He was also called up for the 2007 Copa América. He scored the only goal of the game in a friendly match against Bolivia from the penalty spot on 22 August 2007. Since those tournaments, he has been regularly been called up to the squad and has become a major player in the 2010 World Cup qualifying campaign.

== Career statistics ==
=== Club ===
Appearances and goals by club, season and competition
Club	Season	League			National cup (Note: Includes Copa do Brasil.)		Continental		Other		Total	
Club	Season	Division	Apps	Goals	Apps	Goals	Apps	Goals	Apps	Goals	Apps	Goals
Barcelona SC	1994	Ecuadorian Serie A	0	0	—		0	0	—		0	0
Barcelona SC	1995	Ecuadorian Serie A	0	0	—		0	0	—		0	0
Barcelona SC	1996	Ecuadorian Serie A	0	0	—		0	0	—		0	0
Barcelona SC	1997	Ecuadorian Serie A	0	0	—		0	0	—		0	0
Calvi	1997	Ecuadorian Serie A	0	0	—		0	0	—		0	0
Calvi	1998	Ecuadorian Serie A	0	0	—		0	0	—		0	0
Técnico Universitario	1998	Ecuadorian Serie A	30	0	—		0	0	—		0	0
Técnico Universitario	1999	Serie B	0	0	—		0	0	—		0	0
Macará	1999	Ecuadorian Serie A	15	0	—		0	0	—		0	0
Macará	2000	Ecuadorian Serie A	30	4	—		0	0	—		0	0
Macará	2001	Ecuadorian Serie A	34	8	—		0	0	—		0	0
Barcelona SC (loan)	2002	Ecuadorian Serie A	38	2	—		0	0	—		0	0
LDU Quito	2003	Ecuadorian Serie A	41	7	—		4	0	—		45	7
LDU Quito	2004	Ecuadorian Serie A	39	8	—		15	3	—		54	11
LDU Quito	2005	Ecuadorian Serie A	44	12	—		11	3	—		55	15
LDU Quito	2006	Ecuadorian Serie A	34	5	—		11	5	—		45	10
LDU Quito	2007	Ecuadorian Serie A	30	4	—		4	2	—		34	6
LDU Quito	2008	Ecuadorian Serie A	26	5	—		13	4	2 (Note: Appearances in 2008 FIFA Club World Cup)	0	41	9
LDU Quito	2009	Ecuadorian Serie A	18	1	—		6	0	—		24	1
Fluminense	2009	Série A	5	0	0	0	0	0	—		5	0
LDU Quito	2010*	Ecuadorian Serie A	23	1	—		7	0	1 (Note: Appearance in 2010 Suruga Bank Championship)	1	30	1
LDU Quito	2011	Ecuadorian Serie A	22	0	—		16	1	—		38	1
LDU Quito	2012	Ecuadorian Serie A	28	0	—		0	0	—		28	0
LDU Quito	2013	Ecuadorian Serie A	2	0	—		1	0	—		3	0

=== International ===
Scores and results list Ecuador's goal tally first, score column indicates score after each Urrutia goal.

List of international goals scored by Patricio Urrutia
No.	Date	Venue	Opponent	Score	Result	Competition
1	22 August 2007	Quito, Ecuador	Bolivia	1–0	1–0	Friendly
2	8 September 2007	Quito, Ecuador	El Salvador	5–1	5–1	Friendly
3	15 June 2008	Buenos Aires, Argentina	Argentina	1–0	1–1	2010 FIFA World Cup qualification

== Honours ==
LDU Quito

- Serie A: 2003, 2005 Apertura, 2007, 2010
- Copa Libertadores: 2008
- Recopa Sudamericana: 2009, 2010
