= 2009 Recopa Sudamericana =

- Event: Recopa Sudamericana
Internacional	LDU Quito
(Brazil)	(Ecuador)
0	4

First leg
Internacional	LDU Quito
0	1
- Date: June 25, 2009
- Venue: Estádio José Pinheiro Borba (Beira-Rio), Porto Alegre
- Referee: Juan Soto (Venezuela)
- Attendance: 30,284

Second leg
LDU Quito	Internacional
3	0
- Date: July 9, 2009
- Venue: Estadio Casa Blanca, Quito
- Referee: Carlos Chandía (Chile)
- Attendance: 55,000

The 2009 Recopa Sudamericana was the 17th Recopa Sudamericana, an annual football match between the winners of the previous season's Copa Libertadores and Copa Sudamericana competitions.

The match was contested by Ecuadorian club LDU Quito, the 2008 Copa Libertadores champion, and Brazilian club Internacional, the 2008 Copa Sudamericana champion. LDU Quito won both games of the Recopa 1–0 and 3–0, respectively. Thus, Liga de Quito won their Recopa Sudamericana title and their second international title.

== Qualified teams ==
Team	Previous finals app.
(Brazil) Internacional	**2007**
(Ecuador) LDU Quito	None

Bold indicates winning years

== Venues ==
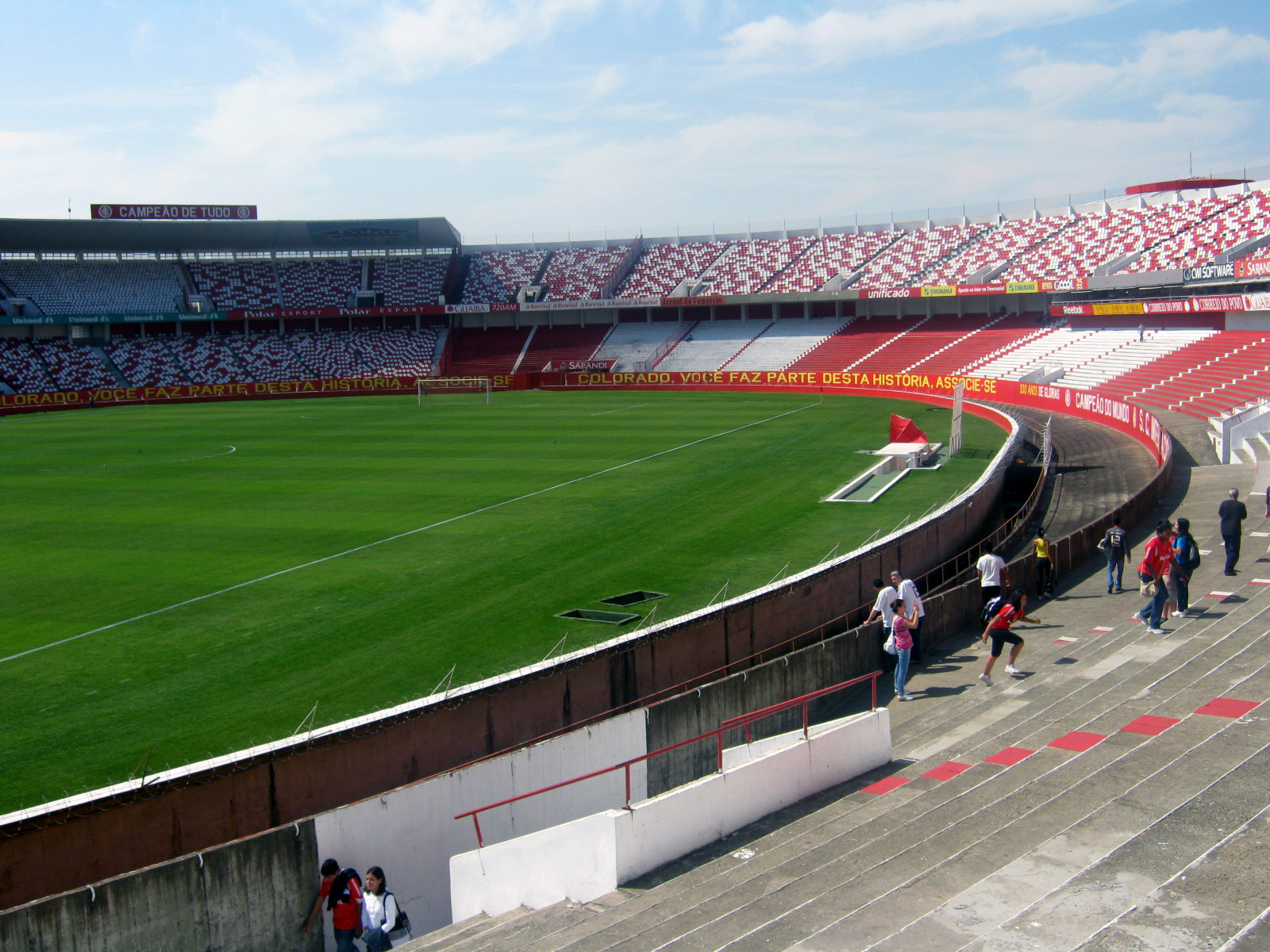
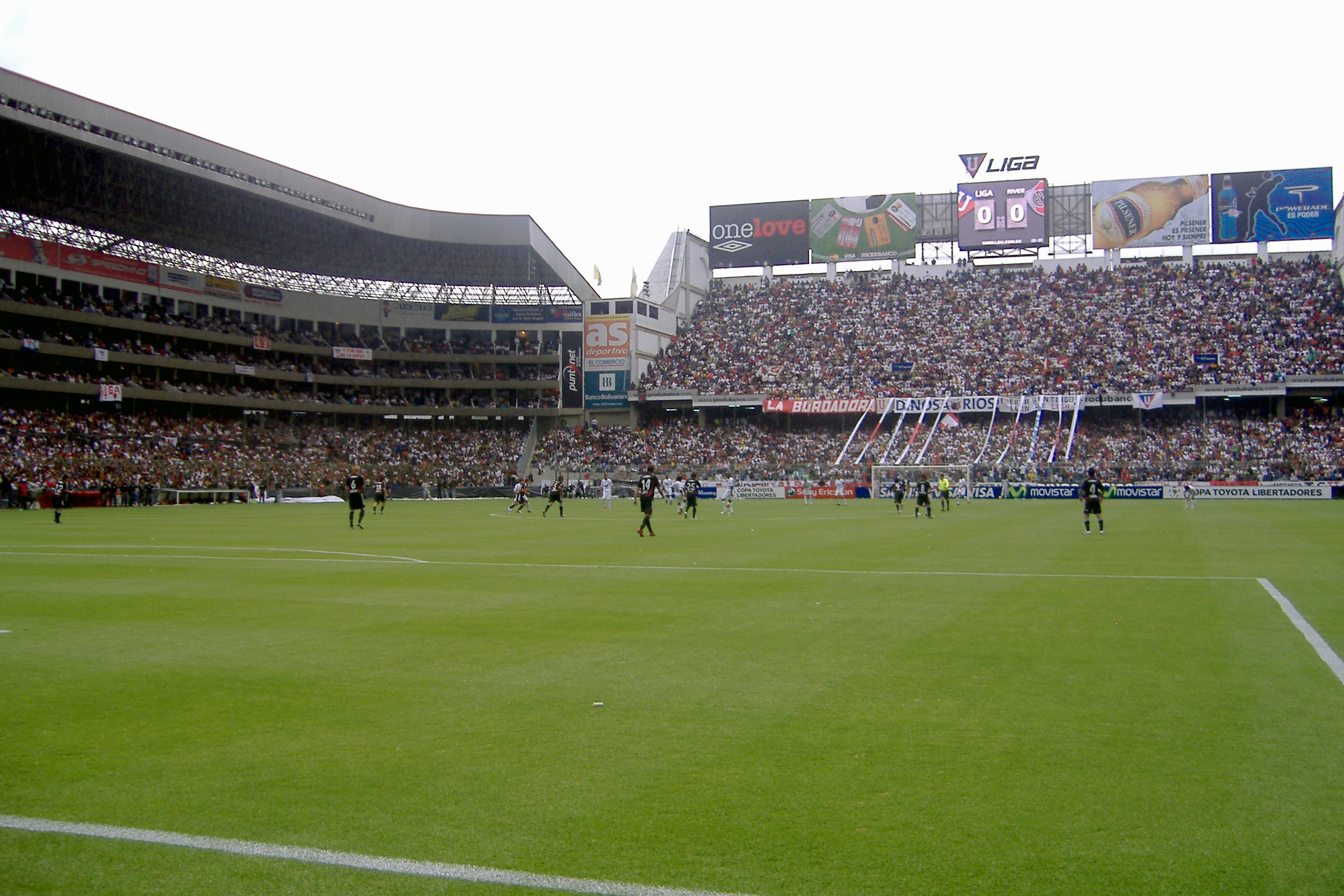
Beira-Rio (left) and Estadio Casa Blanca, venues for the series

== Matches ==
=== First leg ===
2009 Recopa Sudamericana
June 25, 2009
21:50 (UTC-3)

Internacional (Brazil)	0–1	(Ecuador) LDU Quito
	Report	Bieler 57'

Estádio Beira-Rio, Porto Alegre
Attendance: 30,284
Referee: Juan Soto (Venezuela)

**Internacional**	**LDU Quito**

GK	1	(Brazil) Lauro
DF	2	(Brazil) Bolívar	(red card) 72'
DF	3	(Brazil) Índio	(yellow card) 44'
DF	14	(Brazil) Danny
SB	16	(Brazil) Marcelo Cordeiro
MF	8	(Brazil) Sandro	(substituted off) 84'
MF	5	(Argentina) Pablo Guiñazú (c)	(yellow card) 49'
MF	17	(Brazil) Andrezinho	(yellow card) 37' (substituted off) 57'
FW	10	(Argentina) Andrés D'Alessandro
FW	7	(Brazil) Taison
FW	19	(Brazil) Alecsandro	(substituted off) 65'
Substitutes:
GK	12	(Brazil) Michel Alves
DF	4	(Brazil) Álvaro
DF	13	(Brazil) Danilo	(substituted on) 84'
MF	18	(Brazil) Giuliano	(substituted on) 57'
MF	20	(Brazil) Glaydson
FW	21	(Brazil) Leandrão	(substituted on) 69'
MF	24	(Ecuador) Luis Bolaños
Manager:
(Brazil) Tite

GK	22	(Ecuador) Alexander Domínguez
DF	23	(Ecuador) Jairo Campos	(yellow card) 44'
DF	2	(Argentina) Norberto Araujo
DF	3	(Ecuador) Renán Calle	(yellow card) 50' (substituted off) 78'
MF	13	(Ecuador) Néicer Reasco	(yellow card) 75'
DF	5	(Ecuador) Ulises de la Cruz	(yellow card) 38'
MF	8	(Ecuador) Patricio Urrutia (c)
MF	20	(Paraguay) Enrique Vera
FW	10	(Ecuador) Christian Lara	(substituted off) 70'
DF	4	(Ecuador) Paúl Ambrosi	(yellow card) 65'
FW	16	(Argentina) Claudio Bieler	(substituted off) 84'
Substitutes:
GK	1	(Ecuador) José Francisco Cevallos
MF	6	(Ecuador) Pedro Larrea	(substituted on) 84'
MF	7	(Ecuador) Miller Bolaños
FW	9	(Ecuador) Walter Calderón
MF	15	(Ecuador) William Araujo
FW	19	(Argentina) Claudio Graf	(substituted on) 70'
MF	24	(Paraguay) Carlos Espínola	(substituted on) 78'
Manager:
(Uruguay) Jorge Fossati

Assistant referees:
(Venezuela) Rafael Yanez
(Venezuela) Mayker Gómez
Fourth official:
(Venezuela) Gerardo Quintero

=== Second leg ===
July 9, 2009
19:50 (UTC-5)
Second leg

LDU Quito (Ecuador)	3–0	(Brazil) Internacional
Espínola 10'; Bieler 40'; E. Vera 57'	Report

Estadio Casa Blanca, Quito
Attendance: 55,000
Referee: Carlos Chandía (Chile)

**LDU Quito**	**Internacional**

GK	22	(Ecuador) Alexander Domínguez	(substituted off) 63'
MF	13	(Ecuador) Néicer Reasco
DF	23	(Ecuador) Jairo Campos
DF	24	(Paraguay) Carlos Espínola	(yellow card) 1'
DF	2	(Argentina) Norberto Araujo	(yellow card) 77'
MF	4	(Ecuador) Paúl Ambrosi
MF	8	(Ecuador) Patricio Urrutia (c)
MF	20	(Paraguay) Enrique Vera	(substituted off) 81'
MF	5	(Ecuador) Ulises de la Cruz
MF	10	(Ecuador) Christian Lara	(substituted off) 77'
FW	16	(Argentina) Claudio Bieler
Substitutes:
GK	1	(Ecuador) José Francisco Cevallos	(substituted on) 63'
DF	3	(Ecuador) Renán Calle
DF	6	(Ecuador) Pedro Larrea
MF	7	(Ecuador) Miller Bolaños
FW	9	(Ecuador) Walter Calderón
MF	15	(Ecuador) William Araujo	(substituted on) 81'
FW	19	(Argentina) Claudio Graf	(substituted on) 77'
Manager:
(Uruguay) Jorge Fossati

GK	1	(Brazil) Lauro
DF	13	(Brazil) Danilo
DF	3	(Brazil) Índio
DF	14	(Brazil) Danny	(yellow card) 80'
DF	6	(Brazil) Kléber
MF	20	(Brazil) Glaydson	(substituted off) 46'
MF	11	(Brazil) Magrão
MF	5	(Argentina) Pablo Guiñazú (c)
MF	10	(Argentina) Andrés D'Alessandro	(substituted off) 72'
FW	7	(Brazil) Taison	(substituted off) 52'
FW	9	(Brazil) Nilmar
Substitutes:
GK	12	(Brazil) Michel Alves
DF	4	(Brazil) Álvaro
DF	15	(Uruguay) Gonzalo Sorondo
DF	16	(Brazil) Marcelo Cordeiro
MF	17	(Brazil) Andrezinho	(substituted on) 46'
FW	19	(Brazil) Alecsandro	(substituted on) 52'
FW	24	(Ecuador) Luis Bolaños	(substituted on) 72'
Manager:
(Brazil) Tite

Assistant referees:
(Chile) Cristian Julio
(Chile) Lorenzo Acuña
Fourth official:
(Chile) Jorge Osorio
