= Claudio Guerra (footballer, born 1983) =

Argentine footballer

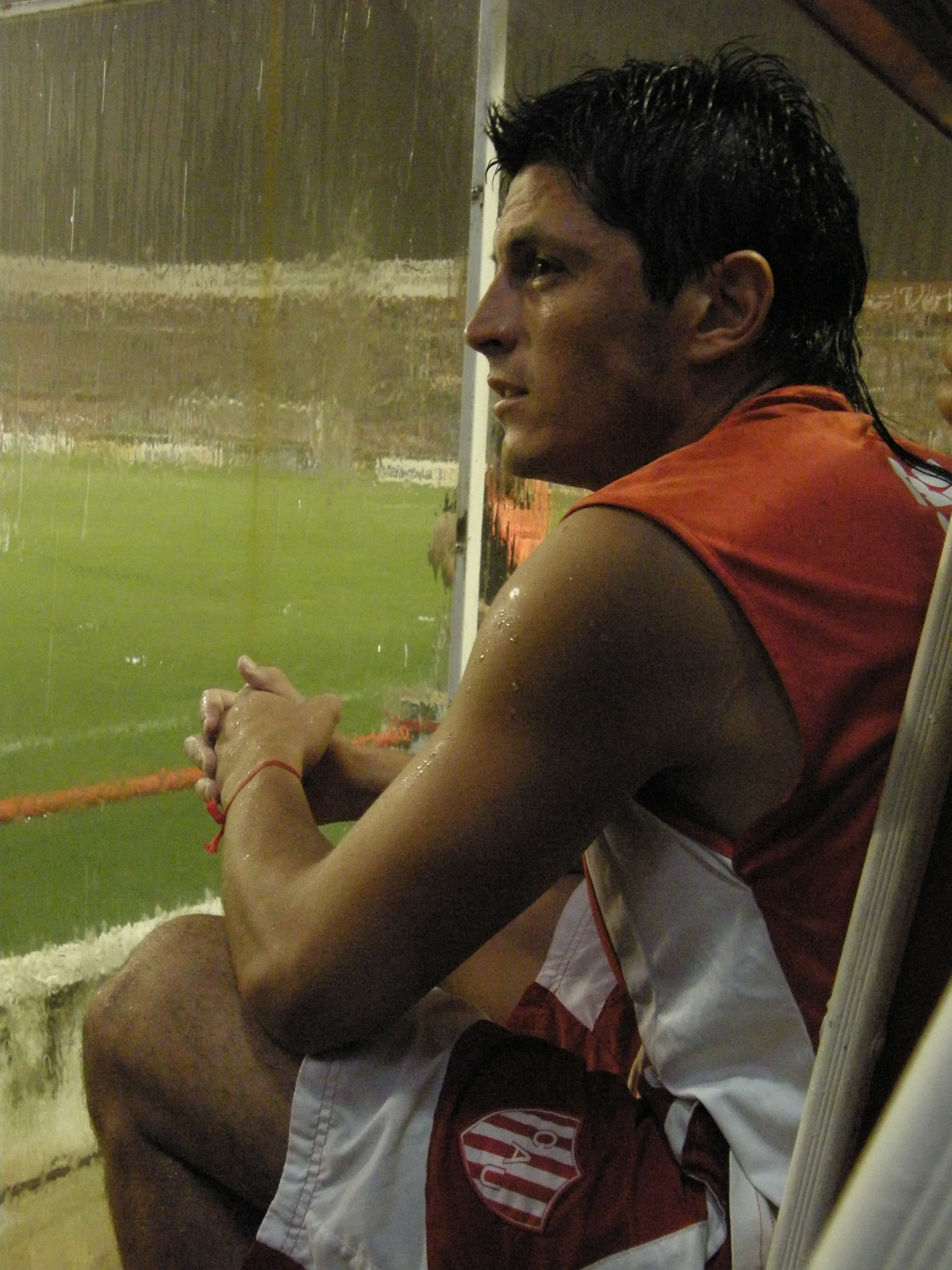
- Guerra with Unión Santa Fe in 2009

Personal information
- Full name: Claudio Rubén Guerra
- Date of birth: 5 September 1983 (age 43)
- Place of birth: Coronel Bermúdez, Buenos Aires, Argentina
- Height: 1.84 m (6 ft 0 in)
- Position: Striker

Youth career
- Huracán

Senior career*
Years	Team	Apps	(Gls)
2002–2011	Huracán	100	(8)
2005–2006	→ Defensores de Belgrano (loan)	29	(13)
2008–2009	→ Unión Santa Fe (loan)	26	(11)
2009–2010	→ Unión Santa Fe (loan)	24	(7)
2010	→ Universidad Católica (loan)	12	(6)
2011–2012	Universidad de Concepción	23	(7)
2012–2013	Aldosivi	28	(3)
2013–2014	Defensa y Justicia	32	(9)
2014–2015	Unión Santa Fe	18	(8)
2015	Sportivo Belgrano	6	(2)
2016	Nueva Chicago	8	(2)
2016	Defensores de Belgrano	0	(0)
2019	Cosmos Santa Fe	3	(1)
Total		309	(77)

Managerial career
- 2023–: Defensa y Justicia (youth)
- * Club domestic league appearances and goals

Claudio Rubén Guerra (born September 5, 1983) is an Argentine former footballer who played as a striker.

== Teams ==
- (Argentina) Huracán 2002–2005
- (Argentina) Defensores de Belgrano 2005–2006
- (Argentina) Huracán 2006–2008
- (Argentina) Unión de Santa Fe 2008–2009
- (Argentina) Huracán 2009
- (Argentina) Unión de Santa Fe 2009–2010
- (Ecuador) Universidad Católica 2010
- (Argentina) Huracán 2011
- (Chile) Universidad de Concepción 2011–2012
- (Argentina) Aldosivi 2012–2013
- (Argentina) Defensa y Justicia 2013–2014
- (Argentina) Unión Santa Fe 2014–2015
- (Argentina) Sportivo Belgrano 2015
- (Argentina) Nueva Chicago 2016
- (Argentina) Defensores de Belgrano 2016
- (Argentina) Cosmos de Santa Fe 2019
