= Nelson Martínez (footballer) =

Ecuadorian footballer (born 1991)

Personal information
- Full name: Nelson Alberto Martínez Sevilla
- Date of birth: October 25, 1991 (age 35)
- Place of birth: Quito, Ecuador
- Position: Midfielder

Team information
- Current team: UTE

Youth career
- 2005−2011: LDU Quito

Senior career*
| Years | Team | Apps | (Gls) |
| 2010−2012 | LDU Quito | 14 | (1) |
| 2011 | → Aucas (loan) | 3 | (0) |
| 2013 | FC UIDE | 30 | (3) |
| 2014−2016 | UTE | 25 | (5) |
- * Club domestic league appearances and goals as of July 2, 2016

Nelson Alberto Martínez Sevilla (born October 25, 1991) is an Ecuadorian football midfielder.

A product of the LDU Quito's youth system, he began making senior club appearances for Liga in 2010. In his professional debut against Independiente del Valle, he ran into defender Armando Wila, fracturing his cheekbone. The injury required Martínez to undergo surgery. In June 2011, he was loaned to Aucas.

== Honors ==
LDU Quito

- Serie A: 2010
