= Omar Guerra =

Colombian footballer (born 1981)

Personal information
- Full name: Omar Alfredo Guerra Castilla
- Date of birth: May 11, 1981 (age 45)
- Place of birth: Barranquilla, Colombia
- Height: 1.70 m (5 ft 7 in)
- Position: Midfielder

Senior career*
| Years | Team | Apps | (Gls) |
| 1999–2003 | Millonarios | 79 | (12) |
| 2004 | → Deportivo Pereira (loan) | 11 | (1) |
| 2005 | → Aucas (loan) | 24 | (17) |
| 2006 | → Deportivo Cuenca (loan) | 26 | (8) |
| 2007 | → Deportivo Quito (loan) | 17 | (6) |
| 2009 | Técnico Universitario | 30 | (16) |
| 2010 | Universidad Católica | 36 | (12) |
| 2011 | Deportivo Cuenca | 15 | (0) |
| 2011– | Santiago Morning | 1 | (0) |
| 2012–2013 | Macará | 70 | (12) |
| 2014 | Olimpia | 38 | (8) |
| 2015 | Uniautónoma | 23 | (1) |
- * Club domestic league appearances and goals as of 13 December 2015

Omar Alfredo Guerra Castilla (born May 11, 1981) is a Colombian football midfielder.

== Club career ==
Guerra began his professional playing career with Millonarios, scoring a goal on his debut, during the second half of 1999. Beginning in 2005, Guerra played for Aucas, Deportivo Cuenca and Deportivo Quito in Serie A de Ecuador, scoring 31 goals in three seasons.

In 2008, he returned to Millonarios for a brief spell, but has since returned to Ecuador to pay for Técnico Universitario from Ambato.
