= Darío Stefanatto =

Argentine footballer

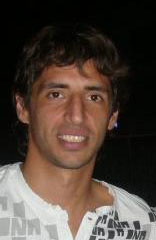
- Stefanatto in 2010

Personal information
- Full name: Darío Gustavo Stefanatto
- Date of birth: 3 April 1985 (age 41)
- Place of birth: Buenos Aires, Argentina
- Height: 1.80 m (5 ft 11 in)
- Position: Midfielder

Youth career
- All Boys

Senior career*
Years	Team	Apps	(Gls)
2005–2021	All Boys	218	(4)
2010–2011	→ Estudiantes LP (loan)	15	(0)
2018–2019	→ Alvarado (loan)	19	(0)
- * Club domestic league appearances and goals

Darío Gustavo Stefanatto (born 3 April 1985) is a retired Argentine footballer who played as midfielder.
