= Víctor Estupiñán =

Ecuadorian footballer (born 1988)

Personal information
- Full name: Víctor Manuel Estupiñán Mairongo
- Date of birth: 5 March 1988 (age 38)
- Place of birth: Quinindé, Ecuador
- Height: 5 ft 10 in (1.78 m)
- Position: Forward

Team information
- Current team: Galácticos FC

Youth career
- 2004–2006: LDU Quito

Senior career*
Years	Team	Apps	(Gls)
2006–2010	LDU Quito	23	(1)
2011	Chivas USA	9	(1)
2012	Universidad Católica	16	(4)
2012	Técnico Universitario	5	(1)
2013	Deportivo Cuenca	34	(9)
2014	Deportivo Quito	31	(3)
2015	Deportivo Quevedo	14	(4)
2015	Aucas	17	(4)
2016	Mushuc Runa	10	(1)
2016–2017	Clan Juvenil	18	(9)
2017	L.D.U. Portoviejo		(6)
2018–	Galácticos FC		

International career^{‡}
2007	Ecuador U20	2	(0)
- * Club domestic league appearances and goals as of 9 February 2020 ‡ National team caps and goals as of 23 October 2011

Víctor Manuel Estupiñán Mairongo (born 5 March 1988) is an Ecuadorian professional footballer who plays as a forward for Galácticos FC.

== Club career ==
Estupiñán was born in Quinindé. He began his career in the youth ranks of LDU Quito. In 2006, he made his debut for the senior side and has been a member of the side that has captured numerous domestic and continental titles since 2007. He participated in the 2009 Copa Sudamericana title run appearing in three matches and assisting on two goals. On 5 November 2009, he helped lead LDU Quito over Vélez Sársfield providing one assist in a 2–1 victory which helped his side reach the semifinals. Following the 2009 season it was reported that Estupiñán would be sent on loan to Macará in order to receive increased playing time, but the move never materialized.

In 2011, he was drafted 14th in the first round of the MLS SuperDraft by Chivas USA. After one season in Los Angeles, Chivas USA opted to decline the option on Estupiñán's contract.

== International career ==
Estupiñán was a member of the Ecuador U20 national team.

== Honors ==
LDU Quito

- Serie A: 2007, 2010
- Copa Libertadores: 2008
- Copa Sudamericana: 2009
