= Diego Quintanilla =

Ecuadorian footballer (born 1991)

Personal information
- Full name: Diego Mauricio Quintanilla Ribadeneira
- Date of birth: 2 February 1991 (age 35)
- Place of birth: Quito, Ecuador
- Position: Midfielder

Team information
- Current team: Alianza Cotopaxi

Youth career
- 2004–2010: LDU Quito

Senior career*
Years	Team	Apps	(Gls)
2010–2012	LDU Quito	2	(0)
2011–2012	→ Aucas (loan)	57	(10)
2013	FC UIDE	13	(7)
2013–2014	Aucas	17	(2)
2015–2016	ESPOLI	35	(2)
2017–	Alianza Cotopaxi	7	(1)
- * Club domestic league appearances and goals as of 12 August 2017

Diego Mauricio Quintanilla Ribadeneira (born 2 February 1991) is an Ecuadorian footballer who plays for Alianza Cotopaxi. A product of LDU Qutio's youth system, he earned his first senior cap on 12 June 2010 in the clasico capitalino against crosstown-rival Deportivo Quito.

== Honors ==
LDU Quito

- Serie A: 2010
