= Enrique Vera =

Paraguayan footballer (born 1979)

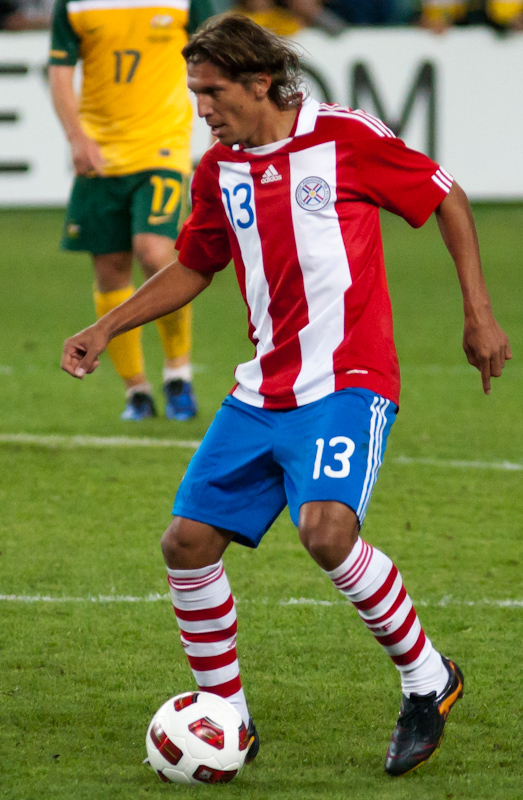
- Vera with Paraguay in 2010

Personal information
- Full name: Enrique Daniel Vera Torres
- Date of birth: 10 March 1979 (age 47)
- Place of birth: Asunción, Paraguay
- Height: 1.76 m (5 ft 9 in)
- Position: Defensive midfielder

Team information
- Current team: Club Libertad (assistant)

Senior career*
Years	Team	Apps	(Gls)
1997	Sportivo Trinidense		
1998–1999	Resistencia		
2000–2002	Sol de América		
2002	Independiente Campo Grande		
2003	Sportivo Iteño		
2004–2005	Aucas	41	(0)
2005	Universidad Católica	7	(1)
2005	Olmedo	35	(0)
2006–2008	LDU Quito	90	(8)
2008–2010	Club América	25	(1)
2009–2010	→ LDU Quito (loan)	18	(1)
2010	Atlas	13	(0)
2011–2016	LDU Quito	132	(4)
2017	Sportivo Luqueño	10	(0)
2017	América de Quito	2	(0)
2022	General Díaz		

International career
2007–2011	Paraguay	52	(4)

Managerial career
- 2024–2025: Tacuary
- 2025: CS Carapeguá
- 2025–2026: Paraguarí
- * Club domestic league appearances and goals

Enrique Daniel Vera Torres, nicknamed Rambert (born 10 March 1979), is a Paraguayan professional football manager and former player who played as a midfielder. He is currently the assistant manager of APF División de Honor club Club Libertad.

Vera has been primarily based with LDU Quito since 2006, winning the 2007 Serie A, the 2008 Copa Libertadores (playing in both legs of the final, the 2009 Recopa Sudamericana, and the 2009 Copa Sudamericana (scoring one goal).

== Club career ==
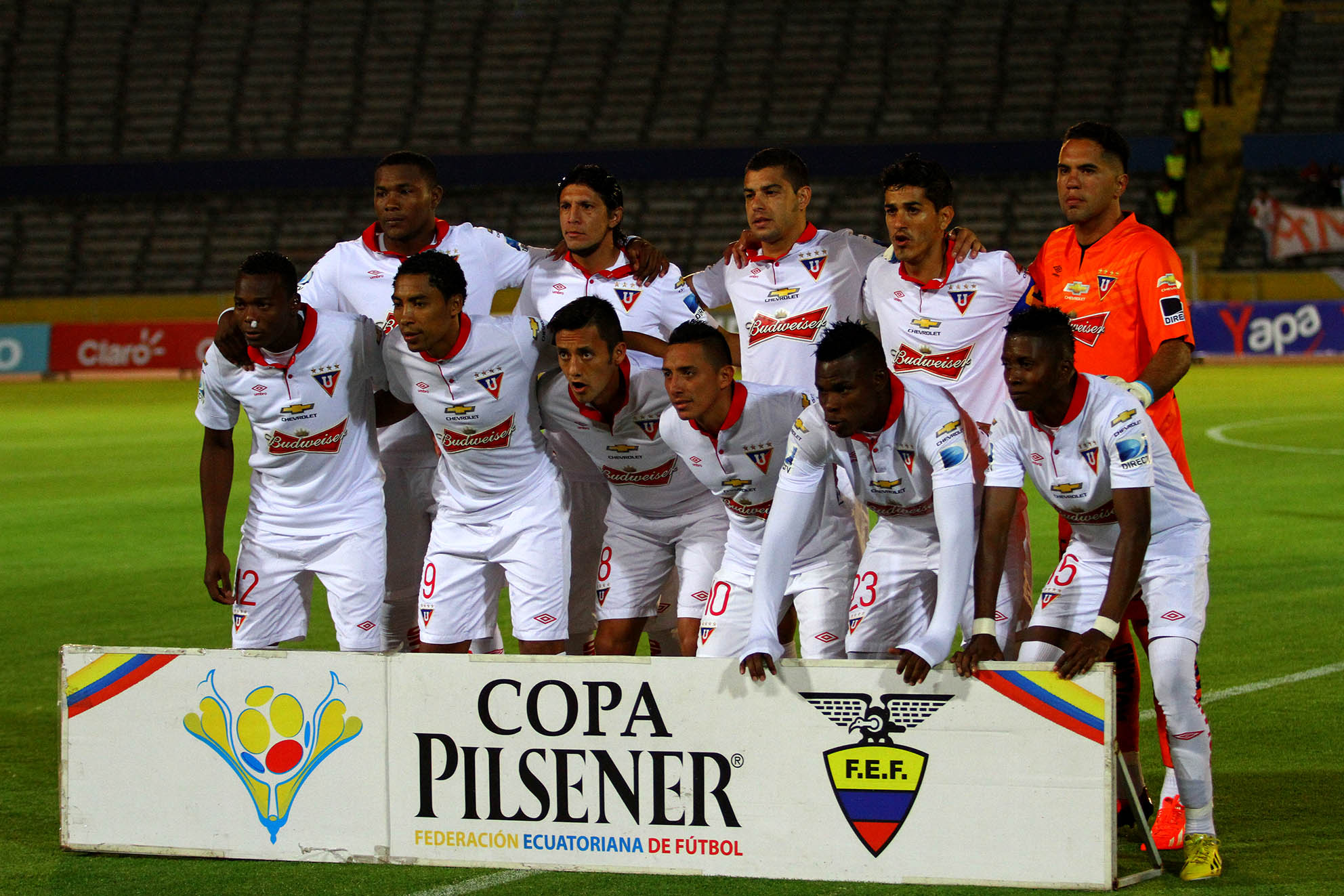
Vera, second left in the back row, with LDU Quito in 2014

Early in his career, Vera played for several Paraguayan clubs such as Resistencia, Sol de América and Sportivo Iteño before moving to Ecuador where he played for teams like Aucas, Olmedo, and LDU Quito. At the end of 2007, he was named best foreign player and best overall player of the Ecuadorian league by the newspaper El Comercio.

During the 2008, Vera was important member of the LDU Quito squad that won the 2008 Copa Libertadores, the first international for the club and for any club in Ecuador. Vera was nominated in the ideal team of the cup when he was chosen as an ideal substitute in the midfield position, along with teammates Damián Manso and Joffre Guerrón.

Shortly after the Copa Libertadores win, he signed a 4-year contract to play for Mexico's Club América. Vera scored his first goal for the Mexican side in his 4th game with the team in the Apertura 2008 1–1 draw against Pachuca.

On 18 June 2009, Vera was loaned back to LDU Quito after a bad spell at América. In the short time back, he was a key player for the club as they won two more international titles: the 2009 Recopa Sudamericana and the 2009 Copa Sudamericana.

He was sold to Atlas by America before the 2010 World Cup, where he would play with Paraguay. After a rather uneventful stint at Atlas, he returned to Ecuador for his third stint at LDU Quito. He has publicly stated he would like to retire at the Quito-based club.

In 2011 during his game with Liga de Quito, Enrique Vera left with a broken leg that took him out for more than a year until he returned to the field. In 2012, he was getting back into shape to start his new season with Liga de Quito in the 2013 season.

In December 2015, it was reported that Enrique Vera had signed with LDU Quito for one more season.

== International career ==
Vera was first called to the Paraguayan football team in 2007 by Gerardo Martino. He has since participated in the 2007 Copa América and in the 2010 FIFA World Cup qualifiers with the national team, which qualified for the 2010 FIFA World Cup in South Africa. He scored in the first half of Paraguay's second group match against Slovakia.

== Career statistics ==
=== International ===
Scores and results list Paraguay's goal tally first, score column indicates score after each Vera goal.

List of international goals scored by Enrique Vera
No.	Date	Venue	Opponent	Score	Result	Competition	Ref.
1	19 November 2008	Sultan Qaboos Sports Complex, Muscat, Oman	Oman	1–0	1–0	Friendly	
2	2 June 2010	Stadion Schützenwiese, Winterthur, Switzerland	Greece	1–0	2–0	Friendly	
3	20 June 2010	Free State Stadium, Bloemfontein, South Africa	Slovakia	1–0	2–0	2010 FIFA World Cup	
4	10 August 2010	Estadio Defensores del Chaco, Asunción, Paraguay	Costa Rica	1–0	2–0	Friendly	

== Honours ==
LDU Quito

- Serie A: 2007
- Copa Libertadores: 2008
- Recopa Sudamericana: 2009
- Copa Sudamericana: 2009
