= Gabriel Espinosa =

Ecuadorian footballer

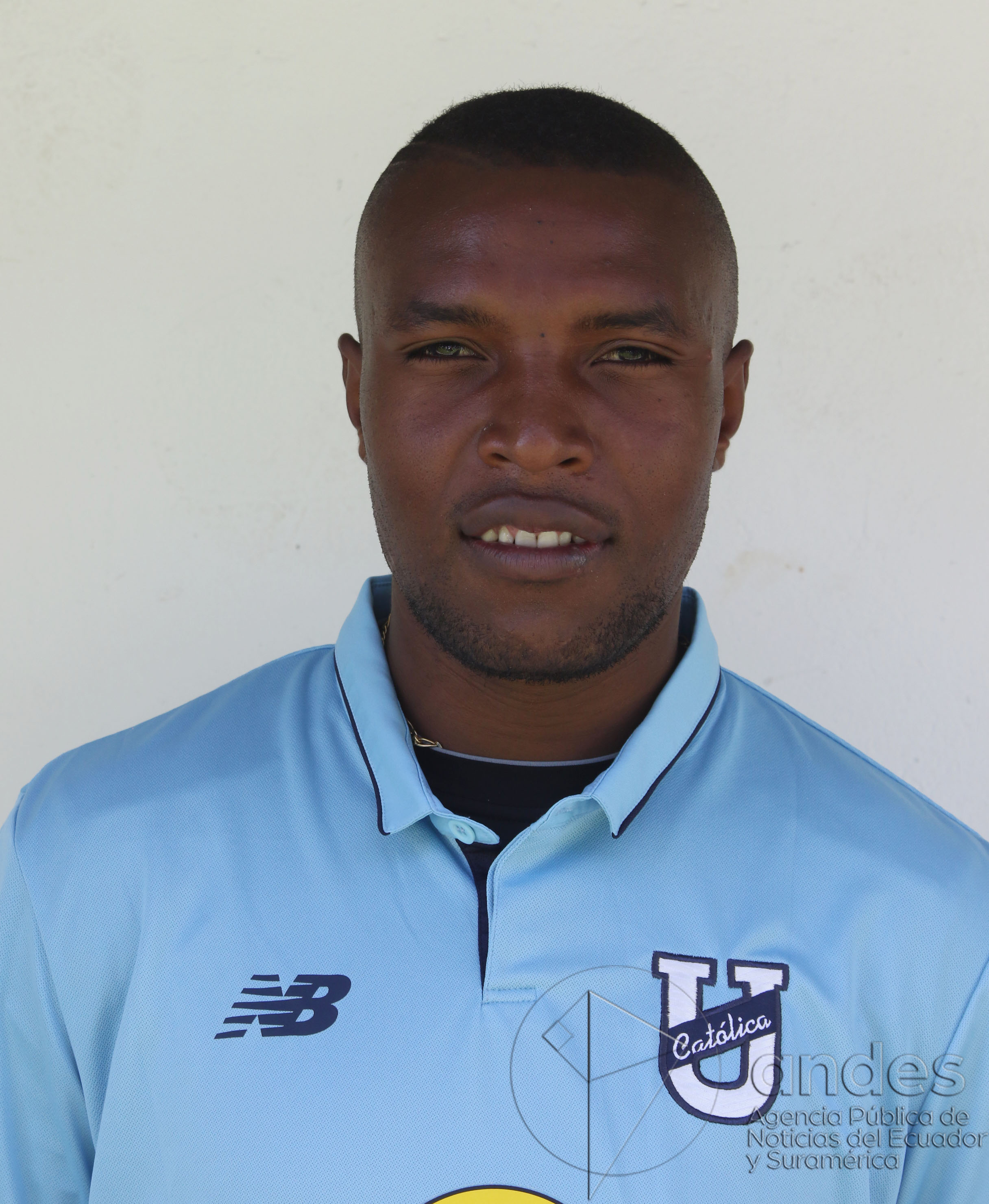
- Espinosa with Universidad Católica in 2016

Personal information
- Full name: Alejandro Gabriel Espinosa Borja
- Date of birth: 13 August 1988 (age 38)
- Place of birth: Quito, Ecuador
- Height: 1.81 m (5 ft 11 in)
- Position: Midfielder

Team information
- Current team: Clan Juvenil
- Number: 4

Youth career
- 2000–2010: LDU Quito

Senior career*
Years	Team	Apps	(Gls)
2006–2011	LDU Quito	25	(1)
2011	→ Univ. Católica (loan)	41	(0)
2012–2016	Universidad Católica	154	(3)
2017	Independiente del Valle	1	(0)
2017–	Clan Juvenil	1	(0)
- * Club domestic league appearances and goals as of 5 February 2017

Alejandro Gabriel Espinosa Borja, known simply as Gabriel Espinosa (born 13 August 1985 in Quito), is an Ecuadorian footballer.

== Honours ==
LDU Quito

- Serie A: 2007, 2010
- Copa Libertadores: 2008
- Recopa Sudamericana: 2010

Universidad Católica

- Serie B: 2012
