= Manuel Mendoza (footballer, born 1989) =

Ecuadorian footballer

Personal information
- Full name: Manuel Alberto Mendoza Rezabala
- Date of birth: January 19, 1989 (age 37)
- Place of birth: Portoviejo, Ecuador
- Position: Goalkeeper

Team information
- Current team: Técnico Universitario
- Number: 12

Youth career
- 2004–2007: LDU Portoviejo

Senior career*
Years	Team	Apps	(Gls)
2006–2009	LDU Portoviejo	69	(0)
2010–2012	LDU Quito	0	(0)
2011	→ LDU Portoviejo (loan)	6	(0)
2012	LDU Portoviejo	24	(0)
2013–	Técnico Universitario	34	(0)

International career^{‡}
2008–2009	Ecuador U-20	4	(0)
- * Club domestic league appearances and goals as of July 13, 2013 ‡ National team caps and goals as of February 6, 2009

Manuel Alberto Mendoza Rezabala (born January 19, 1989, in Portoviejo) is an Ecuadorian football goalkeeper who plays for Técnico Universitario.

== Club career ==
Mendoza has been playing professionally for LDU Portoviejo in recent times although he has not been a regular. He is expected to play more games for his club because of the stellar performance in the 2009 South American Youth Championship.

In December 2009, he transferred to LDU Quito.

== International career ==
Mendoza played a starting rolein Ecuador's participation in the 2009 South American Youth Championship. He had great performances for Ecuador's campaign. Against Peru he was close to saving a penalty from Reimond Manco. Mendoza kept two clean-sheets against Venezuela and Colombia. In the game against Argentina, he made an error, along with the defense, and Argentina tied the game 2–2 in the last minutes of the game. Ecuador would be eliminated from the tournament by coin toss, despite a respectable campaign.

Mendoza received a call-up to the senior team in early February 2009 for an unofficial friendly against England's U-21 team. He was an unused substitute and didn't play in Ecuador's 3–2 win.
