= Néicer Reasco =

Ecuadorian footballer (born 1977)

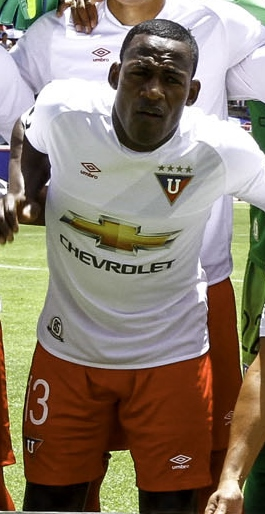
- Reasco with L.D.U. Quito in 2015

Personal information
- Full name: Néicer Reasco Yano
- Date of birth: 23 July 1977 (age 49)
- Place of birth: San Lorenzo, Esmeraldas, Ecuador
- Height: 1.71 m (5 ft 7 in)
- Position: Full back

Youth career
- 1994–1997: Tres de Julio

Senior career*
Years	Team	Apps	(Gls)
1997–2006	L.D.U. Quito	316	(19)
2001	→ Newell's Old Boys (loan)	11	(0)
2006–2008	São Paulo	6	(0)
2008–2016	L.D.U. Quito	239	(17)
2017	Aucas	44	(2)
2018	Atlético Saquisilí	12	(1)
Total		628	(39)

International career
1998–2011	Ecuador	57	(0)
- * Club domestic league appearances and goals as of 16 June 2018

Néicer Reasco Yano (born 23 July 1977) is an Ecuadorian retired footballer who played as a defender.

== Club career ==
Reasco began his professional club career playing for L.D.U. Quito for seven years. After the 2006 World Cup, he joined São Paulo in Brazil for a two-year contract, the only non-Brazilian on the team. In mid-2008, he rejoined his first club.

== International career ==
He was part of the Ecuador national team that competed at the 2006 FIFA World Cup in Germany. He was named to Ecuador's squad for the 2007 and 2011 Copa América.

== Personal life ==
Reasco is the father of Ecuador forward Djorkaeff Reasco, who made his debut for LDU Quito in November 2016 in a game Reasco Sr. also played in.

== Honors ==
L.D.U. Quito

- Serie A: 1998, 1999, 2003, 2005 Apertura, 2010
- Serie B: 2001
- Copa Sudamericana: 2009
- Recopa Sudamericana: 2009, 2010

São Paulo

- Campeonato Brasileiro Série A: 2006, 2007, 2008
