= Christian Lara (footballer) =

Ecuadorian footballer (born 1980)

Personal information
- Full name: Christian Rolando Lara Anangonó
- Date of birth: 27 April 1980 (age 46)
- Place of birth: Quito, Ecuador
- Height: 1.62 m (5 ft 4 in)
- Position: Attacking midfielder

Youth career
- 1994–1999: El Nacional

Senior career*
Years	Team	Apps	(Gls)
1997–2005	El Nacional	184	(28)
2006	Al-Wakrah	12	(2)
2007	L.D.U. Quito	44	(16)
2008	Barcelona SC	41	(4)
2009	Deportivo Pereira	10	(1)
2009–2010	L.D.U. Quito	46	(3)
2011	El Nacional	31	(3)
2012	Real Cartagena	8	(0)
2012–2013	Manta	38	(5)
2014	Deportivo Quito	43	(8)
2015–2016	El Nacional	81	(14)
2017	Dorados de Sinaloa	3	(0)
2018	Clan Juvenil	14	(3)
2018	El Nacional	12	(0)
Total		590	(115)

International career
2002–2008	Ecuador	28	(4)
- * Club domestic league appearances and goals

Christian Rolando Lara Anangonó, nicknamed Diablito (Little Devil) (born 27 April 1980, in Quito, Pichincha Province), is an Ecuadorian former footballer who played as a left winger. His last club was Sociedad Atlética Sancor, a team competing in Ecuador's Segunda Categoría, the third tier of the national football league system. He was an international player for the Ecuador national football team and was part of the squad that participated in the 2006 FIFA World Cup in Germany.

== Club career ==
Lara came through all youth divisions of Club Deportivo El Nacional, where he played until mid-2006, when he was loaned to Al-Wakrah SC of Qatar. With El Nacional, he competed from 1998, the year he made his debut in Ecuador's top division, and remained at the club until 2006. During this period, he scored a goal in the 2001 Copa Libertadores against River Plate. He also scored a goal in the 2006 FIFA World Cup qualifiers against Argentina, in a 2–0 victory for Ecuador.

After his time at El Nacional, he had a brief international spell with Al-Wakrah SC in Qatar. In 2007, he returned to Ecuador to join Liga Deportiva Universitaria de Quito, with whom he won the Ecuadorian league title that same year.

He later played for Barcelona Sporting Club (2008) and Deportivo Pereira in Colombia (2009). That same year, he returned to Liga de Quito, where he was part of the squad that won the 2009 Copa Sudamericana, the 2009 and 2010 Recopa Sudamericana, and the 2010 Ecuadorian championship. In 2011, he returned to Club Deportivo El Nacional. That same year, a possible transfer to the Indian club Euro Musketeers was reported, although it did not materialize. In 2012, he joined Real Cartagena in Colombia, after having played in clubs in Ecuador, Qatar, and Deportivo Pereira. In 2017, he played for Mexican club Dorados de Sinaloa, where he had a brief spell before returning to Ecuador.

In 2022, he returned to football after retirement, joining Sociedad Deportiva Rayo in Ecuador's Segunda Categoría (the third tier of the national league system, organized regionally). In 2025, he played for Sociedad Atlética Sancor, also in the Segunda Categoría.

== International career ==
Lara was an international for the Ecuador national team, earning 28 caps and scoring four goals. He was part of the squad that competed in the 2006 FIFA World Cup in Germany. During the South American qualifiers, he scored a goal in Ecuador's 2–0 victory over Argentina in 2005.

== Honors ==
During his career, Lara finished as runner-up in the Ecuadorian Serie A in 1999, 2000, and 2001. Among his main achievements are the Ecuadorian league titles in 2005 with El Nacional, and in 2007 and 2010 with Liga de Quito. He also won the 2009 Copa Sudamericana and the 2009 and 2010 Recopa Sudamericana with Liga de Quito.

He was named the best player of the Ecuadorian league in 2007.

== Controversies ==
In April 2026, he was detained in Quito in the context of an investigation into an alleged attempted robbery of a commercial establishment, according to police authorities. According to those authorities, he was allegedly linked to a group involved in the incident. The case remains under investigation. Subsequently, a judge ordered pretrial detention for those involved while the investigation proceeds.

== Career statistics ==
=== Club ===
As of 29 June 2018

Club	Season	League			Cup		Continental		Total	
Club	Season	Division	Apps	Goals	Apps	Goals	Apps	Goals	Apps	Goals
El Nacional	2000	Serie A	3	1	—		0	0	3	1
El Nacional	2001	Serie A	34	15	—		3	1	37	16
El Nacional	2002	Serie A	40	11	—		8	0	48	11
El Nacional	2003	Serie A	40	9	—		3	0	43	9
El Nacional	2004	Serie A	38	6	—		6	0	44	6
El Nacional	2005	Serie A	40	11	—		2	1	42	12
El Nacional	2006	Serie A	16	2	—		6	1	22	3
El Nacional	Total		211	55	—		28	3	239	58
Al-Wakrah SC	2006–07	Q-League	12	2	0	0	0	0	12	2
Al-Wakrah SC	Total		12	2	0	0	0	0	12	2
L.D.U. Quito	2007	Serie A	44	16	—		6	0	50	16
L.D.U. Quito	Total		44	16	—		6	0	50	16
Barcelona SC	2008	Serie A	41	4	—		0	0	41	4
Barcelona SC	Total		41	4	—		0	0	41	4
Deportivo Pereira	2009	Liga Águila	16	2	0	0	0	0	16	2
Deportivo Pereira	Total		16	2	0	0	0	0	16	2
L.D.U. Quito	2009	Serie A	14	0	—		7	0	21	0
L.D.U. Quito	2010	Serie A	34	3	—		5	0	39	3
L.D.U. Quito	Total		48	3	—		12	0	60	3
El Nacional	2011	Serie A	31	3	—		0	0	31	3
El Nacional	Total		31	3	—		0	0	31	3
Real Cartagena	2012	Liga Águila	8	0	3	0	0	0	11	0
Real Cartagena	Total		8	0	3	0	0	0	11	0
Manta FC	2012	Serie A	20	3	—		0	0	20	3
Manta FC	2013	Serie A	18	2	—		0	0	18	2
Manta FC	Total		38	5	—		0	0	38	5
Deportivo Quito	2014	Serie A	43	8	—		2	0	45	8
Deportivo Quito	Total		43	8	—		2	0	45	8
El Nacional	2015	Serie A	41	4	—		0	0	41	4
El Nacional	2016	Serie A	40	10	—		0	0	40	10
El Nacional	Total		81	14	—		0	0	81	14
Dorados de Sinaloa	2017	Ascenso MX	3	0	4	1	0	0	7	1
Dorados de Sinaloa	Total		3	0	4	1	0	0	7	1
Clan Juvenil	2018	Serie B	14	3	—		0	0	14	3
Clan Juvenil	Total		14	3	—		0	0	14	3
El Nacional	2018	Serie A	0	0	—		0	0	0	0
El Nacional	Total		0	0	—		0	0	0	0
Career total			590	115	7	1	48	3	645	119

== Honors ==
El Nacional

- Serie A: 2005 Clausura

LDU Quito

- Serie A: 2007, 2010
- Copa Sudamericana: 2009
- Recopa Sudamericana: 2009, 2010
