= Ricardo Delgado (Colombian footballer) =

Colombian footballer (born 1994)

Personal information
- Full name: Ricardo Delgado Araujo
- Date of birth: 24 July 1994 (age 32)
- Place of birth: Florencia, Colombia
- Height: 1.66 m (5 ft 5 in)
- Position: Attacking midfielder

Youth career
- –2012: Envigado

Senior career*
Years	Team	Apps	(Gls)
2012–2015	Envigado	9	(2)
2015	Jaguares de Córdoba	14	(1)
2016–2017	Valledupar	49	(14)
2018	Deportivo Pasto	9	(0)
2019	Pirata	1	(0)
2019	Bogotá	9	(0)
2025	Vacaville Elite	10	(3)
- * Club domestic league appearances and goals as of 18:53, 18 October 2020 (UTC)

Ricardo Delgado Araujo (born 24 July 1994) is a Colombian footballer who currently plays for Vacaville Elite, formerly of Bogotá. He's a right-footed offensive midfielder.
