= Juan Manuel Salgueiro =

Uruguayan footballer (born 1983)

Personal information
- Full name: Juan Manuel Salgueiro Silva
- Date of birth: April 3, 1983 (age 43)
- Place of birth: Montevideo, Uruguay
- Height: 1.78 m (5 ft 10 in)
- Position: Forward

Senior career*
Years	Team	Apps	(Gls)
2002–2006	Danubio	83	(21)
2006	Real Murcia	9	(0)
2007	Necaxa	8	(1)
2007–2011	Estudiantes	58	(7)
2010	→ LDU Quito (loan)	39	(8)
2011–2012	San Lorenzo	52	(8)
2012–2013	Olimpia	44	(11)
2014	Toluca	9	(2)
2014–2016	Olimpia	58	(11)
2016	Botafogo	11	(1)
2017–2018	Nacional	62	(13)
2018–2019	Libertad	19	(1)
2020–2021	San Lorenzo	7	(1)
- * Club domestic league appearances and goals as of 14:00, 9 May 2020 (UTC)

Juan Manuel Salgueiro Silva (Note: In this Spanish name, the first or paternal surname is Salgueiro and the second or maternal family name is Silva.) (born April 3, 1983) is a Uruguayan football striker who plays for Club Sportivo San Lorenzo.

== Career ==
Salgueiro started his professional career with Danubio in Montevideo. He was part of the squad that won the Uruguayan Primera División in 2004. Salgueiro had a loan spell with Real Murcia in Spain in 2006 and in 2007, followed by a brief spell at Mexican Club Necaxa before joining Estudiantes later that year. After finishing as the runner-up in 2008 Copa Sudamericana, Salgueiro was part of the Estudiantes squad that won 2009 Copa Libertadores. Salguerio subsequently transferred to LDU Quito in January 2010 as the team's reinforcement. in 2012 Olimpia

== Honours ==
Danubio

- Primera División: 2004

Estudiantes de La Plata

- Copa Libertadores: 2009

LDU Quito

- Serie A: 2010
- Recopa Sudamericana: 2010

== See also ==
- List of expatriate footballers in Paraguay
- Players and Records in Paraguayan Football
