= Carlos Espínola (footballer, born 1975) =

Paraguayan footballer

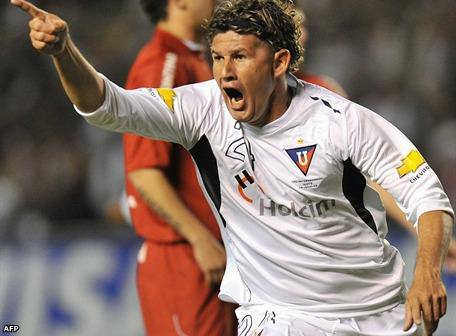

Personal information
- Full name: Carlos Alberto Espínola Oviedo
- Date of birth: 25 December 1975 (age 50)
- Place of birth: Yaguarón, Paraguay
- Height: 1.87 m (6 ft 2 in)
- Position: Defender

Senior career*
Years	Team	Apps	(Gls)
1996–1998	Cerro Porteño	39	(3)
1999	América	20	(2)
2000–2001	Cerro Porteño	36	(3)
2001	Libertad	4	(0)
2002	Sport Colombia	23	(2)
2003–2006	LDU Quito	154	(13)
2008	Deportivo Cali	17	(2)
2008	Emelec	8	(0)
2009–2010	LDU Quito	43	(3)
2011	Sporting Cristal	10	(0)

International career
2000–2004	Paraguay	4	(0)
- * Club domestic league appearances and goals as of 14 June 2012

Carlos Arberto Espínola Oviedo (born 25 December 1975) is a retired Paraguayan football defender.

Espínola began his professional career at Paraguayan club Cerro Porteño for three years, winning a national title with them in 1996. He had a brief spell at Mexican powerhouse América in 1999, but returned to Cerro Porteño the next year where he won another national title. Over the next two years, Espínola played for Paraguayan Primera División clubs Libertad and Sport Colombia.

In 2003, Espínola went to Ecuador to play for LDU Quito, where he had considerable success winning a national championship in 2003 and in 2005. In the last game of the 2006 season, Espínola was involved in a melee during a match against Barcelona. During the melee, Espínola kicked Leonardo Soledispa in the face. He received a one-year suspension for his actions.

He returned in 2008 after completing his suspension to play for Deportivo Cali in Colombia and Emelec in Ecuador. In 2009, he returned to LDU Quito where he was an integral member of the squad that won the 2009 Recopa Sudamericana and 2009 Copa Sudamericana.

He played for the Paraguay national team between 2000 and 2004.

== Honors ==
Cerro Porteño

- Primera División: 1996, 2001

LDU Quito

- Serie A: 2003, 2005 Apertura, 2010
- Copa Sudamericana: 2009
- Recopa Sudamericana: 2009, 2010
