= Ancón, Ecuador =

Rural parish in Ecuador

Coordinates: 2°19′19″S 80°51′16″W

Ancón is a rural parish of Santa Elena canton in the province of Santa Elena, Ecuador.

People began settling in the area in late 1923, when the Government of Ecuador conceded 98 mines, occupying an area of 38,842 hectares, to the British oil company Anglo Ecuadorian Oilfields. The area was initially used as a mining camp.

For many years, the oilfields were of major national economic importance. In 1911, the first barrel of oil was extracted from the Ancon 1 well。 As the first oil city in Ecuador, many families of mostly European backgrounds relocated to the area in search of work, increasing the area's stature. They remained after the British company left in 1979, taking up such trades as fishing.

In subsequent years, Ancón achieved rapid population growth and economic development. In mid-November 2007, Santa Elena became a separate province.

== Climate ==
Climate data for Ancón, elevation 2,348 m (7,703 ft), (1961–1990)
Month	Jan	Feb	Mar	Apr	May	Jun	Jul	Aug	Sep	Oct	Nov	Dec	Year
Mean daily maximum °C (°F)	28.0 (82.4)	29.1 (84.4)	29.7 (85.5)	29.2 (84.6)	27.3 (81.1)	25.1 (77.2)	23.7 (74.7)	23.2 (73.8)	23.3 (73.9)	23.7 (74.7)	24.6 (76.3)	26.0 (78.8)	26.1 (78.9)
Daily mean °C (°F)	25.2 (77.4)	26.3 (79.3)	26.5 (79.7)	26.0 (78.8)	24.7 (76.5)	23.0 (73.4)	22.0 (71.6)	21.3 (70.3)	21.2 (70.2)	21.7 (71.1)	22.3 (72.1)	23.6 (74.5)	23.7 (74.6)
Mean daily minimum °C (°F)	22.6 (72.7)	23.2 (73.8)	23.3 (73.9)	22.7 (72.9)	21.7 (71.1)	20.6 (69.1)	19.6 (67.3)	19.0 (66.2)	19.2 (66.6)	19.7 (67.5)	20.2 (68.4)	21.2 (70.2)	21.1 (70.0)
Average precipitation mm (inches)	12.0 (0.47)	38.0 (1.50)	61.0 (2.40)	14.0 (0.55)	1.0 (0.04)	0.0 (0.0)	0.0 (0.0)	1.0 (0.04)	0.0 (0.0)	0.0 (0.0)	0.0 (0.0)	2.0 (0.08)	129 (5.08)
Source: FAO
