= Carlos Luna (footballer) =

Argentine footballer

Personal information
- Full name: Carlos Ariel Luna
- Date of birth: January 17, 1982 (age 44)
- Place of birth: Piquillín, Córdoba, Argentina
- Height: 1.74 m (5 ft 9 in)
- Position: Forward

Senior career*
Years	Team	Apps	(Gls)
2000–2003	Deportivo Español	52	(7)
2003–2004	All Boys	39	(17)
2004–2005	Tigre	37	(24)
2005–2006	Racing	21	(6)
2006–2007	Quilmes	23	(8)
2007–2008	Elche	26	(8)
2008–2010	Tigre	71	(38)
2010–2012	LDU Quito	28	(6)
2011–2012	→Tigre (loan)	37	(16)
2012–2013	River Plate	25	(6)
2013–2014	Rosario Central	31	(5)
2014–2021	Tigre	137	(36)
- * Club domestic league appearances and goals

Carlos Ariel Luna (born January 17, 1982, in Piquillín, Córdoba) is a retired Argentine footballer who played as a forward.

== Career ==
Luna started his career in 2000 in the 3rd tier of Argentine football with Deportivo Español. In 2001-2002 he was part of the squad that won promotion to the Primera B Nacional where he played for one season before dropping back down a division to play for All Boys in 2003-2004 and Club Atlético Tigre in 2004–2005.

Luna was signed by Racing Club de Avellaneda of the Primera Division Argentina for the 2005–2006 season but was offloaded to Quilmes in 2006.

During his time at Quilmes the club endured one of their worst seasons finishing bottom of the table with only 21 points. Despite the weakness of the team Luna managed to score seven goals in the Clausura 2007 tournament, bringing him to the attention of Elche and prompting his move to Spain during the June–July 2007 transfer window. During the Clausura 2009 Luna scored 11 goals, nearly half of Tigre's 24 and helped them to qualify for the Copa Sudamericana 2009. LDU Quito signed the Argentine forward "El Chino" for $3m from Argentine side Club Atlético Tigre.

On March 17, 2011, in a match versus Peñarol, Luna scored the 12,000th goal in the history of the Copa Libertadores.

== Honors ==
=== Club ===
Deportivo Español

- Primera B Metropolitana: 2001–02

LDU Quito

- Serie A: 2010
- Recopa Sudamericana: 2010

=== Individual ===
- Argentine Primera División top scorer (1): Clausura 2012
