= José Pabón =

Ecuadorian footballer (born 1991)

Personal information
- Full name: José Alexander Pabón de la Cruz
- Date of birth: August 8, 1991 (age 35)
- Place of birth: Quito, Ecuador
- Height: 1.78 m (5 ft 10 in)
- Position: Defender

Team information
- Current team: Técnico Universitario

Youth career
- 2005–2009: LDU Quito

Senior career*
Years	Team	Apps	(Gls)
2010–2013	LDU Quito	13	(0)
2014–2015	El Nacional	31	(0)
2016	Mushuc Runa	11	(0)
2017–	Técnico Universitario	0	(0)
- * Club domestic league appearances and goals as of December 4, 2017

José Alexander Pabón de la Cruz (born August 8, 1991) is an Ecuadorian footballer who plays as a defender for Técnico Universitario. He is the nephew of the historic Ecuadorian footballer Ulises de la Cruz.

== Honors ==
LDU Quito

- Serie A: 2010
