= Ángel Cheme =

Ecuadorian footballer (born 1981)

Personal information
- Full name: Ángel Lizardo Cheme Ortiz
- Date of birth: 19 November 1981 (age 44)
- Place of birth: Esmeraldas, Ecuador
- Position: Midfielder

Team information
- Current team: Atlético Saquisilí

Youth career
- 2003–2004: Aucas

Senior career*
Years	Team	Apps	(Gls)
2000	Deportivo Amistad	3	(0)
2001	Calvi	7	(0)
2002	Tacito Ortiz Urriola	15	(2)
2003–2006	Aucas	26	(6)
2007–2008	Olmedo	60	(7)
2009–2012	LDU Quito	72	(3)
2013	Deportivo Quito	12	(0)
2014	Olmedo	21	(0)
2015	Espoli	16	(2)
2015	L.D.U. Loja	18	(1)
2016	Deportivo Cuenca	9	(0)
2016	Colón	11	(1)
2017–	Atlético Saquisilí	13	(5)
- * Club domestic league appearances and goals

Ángel Lizardo Cheme Ortiz (born 19 November 1981) is an Ecuadorian footballer.

He played the majority of his professional career as Gonzalo Javier Chila Palma, and claimed a date of birth of 9 December 1984, thus enabling him to play in age-restricted matches for three years after he was entitled to do so.

== Identity case ==
In December 2010, Cheme was accused of aggravated identity theft by the actual Gonzalo Chila, an evangelical pastor in Guayaquil. This led the Ecuadorian Football Federation (FEF) to investigate the accusations and apply any applicable punishments. FEF concluded that Cheme had used Chila's identity to play and was suspended for one year.
