= 2009 Liga Deportiva Universitaria de Quito season =

LDU Quito
2009 season
- President: Carlos Arroyo
- Manager: Jorge Fossati
- Serie A: 4th
- Copa Libertadores: Second Stage
- Recopa Sudamericana: Champions (1st title)
- Copa Sudamericana: Champions (1st title)
- Top goalscorer: League: Claudio Bieler (22 goals); All: Claudio Bieler (32 goals)
- Highest home attendance: 24,919; (September 27 v. Barcelona)
- Lowest home attendance: 1,033; (February 13 v. Manta)
- Average home league attendance: 7,920
Home colours	Away colours	Third colours

Liga Deportiva Universitaria de Quito's 2009 season was the club's 56th year in professional football, and the 48th in the top level of professional football in Ecuador. The club participated in their 14th Copa Libertadores, where they unsuccessfully defended their 2008 title. The club also participate in, and won, their first Recopa Sudamericana. They also won their first Copa Sudamericana title.

This season marked the second coaching tenure of Uruguayan Jorge Fossati. He previously led the team between 2003 and 2004, and led the team to their 7th national championship in 2003.

== Club ==
=== Personnel ===
President: Carlos Arroyo
Honorary President: Rodrigo Paz
Manager: Jorge Fossati
President of the Football Commission: Edwin Ripalda
Assistant: Eduardo de Capellán
Physical Trainer: Alejandro Valenzuela

=== Kits ===
Supplier: Umbro
Sponsor(s): Holcim, Powerade, Chevrolet

Recopa Sudamericana principal kit	Recopa Sudamericana alternate	Peace Cup principal kit	Peace Cup alternate

== Squad information ==
N	Pos	Nat.	Player	Age	Since	App	Goals	Notes
1	GK	(Ecuador)	José Francisco Cevallos	37	2008	19	0	
2	DF	(Argentina)	Norberto Araujo	30	2007	62	0	
3	DF	(Ecuador)	Renán Calle	32	2007	42	4	
4	DF	(Ecuador)	Ulises de la Cruz	34	2009	128	20	Previously with the club from '97-'99 and '00
5	MF	(Ecuador)	Alfonso Obregón	36	2002	306	10	Previously with the club from '98-'00
6	MF	(Ecuador)	Pedro Larrea	22	2003	64	0	
8	MF	(Ecuador)	Édison Méndez	29	2009	60	6	Previously with the club from '05-'07
9	FW	(Ecuador)	Walter Calderón	31	2009	0	0	
10	MF	(Ecuador)	Christian Lara	28	2009	44	16	Previously with the club in '07
11	FW	(Ecuador)	Franklin Salas	27	2008	208	45	Previously with the club from '00-'07
13	DF	(Ecuador)	Néicer Reasco (captain)	31	2008	324	22	Previously with the club from '97-'00 and '01-'06
14	DF	(Ecuador)	Diego Calderón	22	2007	62	2	Previously with the club in '05
15	MF	(Ecuador)	William Araujo	29	2008	33	4	
16	FW	(Argentina)	Claudio Bieler	24	2008	31	13	
17	FW	(Ecuador)	Danny Vera	28	2009	0	0	
18	MF	(Ecuador)	Ángel Cheme	24	2009	0	0	
19	FW	(Argentina)	Claudio Graf	32	2009	0	0	
20	MF	(Paraguay)	Enrique Vera	29	2009	90	8	Previously with the club from '06-'08
21	MF	(Ecuador)	Edder Vaca	23	2008	22	7	
22	GK	(Ecuador)	Alexander Domínguez	21	2006	34	0	
23	DF	(Ecuador)	Jayro Campos	24	2005	114	6	
24	DF	(Ecuador)	Gabriel Espinosa	20	2006	15	1	
25	GK	(Ecuador)	Daniel Viteri	27	2008	9	0	
27	FW	(Ecuador)	Víctor Estupiñán	20	2006	9	0	
33	DF	(Ecuador)	Carlos Espínola	33	2009	154	13	Previously with the club from '03-'06
50	MF	(Ecuador)	Danny Vaca	18	2007	22	1	
51	MF	(Ecuador)	Miler Bolaños	18	2009	0	0	
52	MF	(Ecuador)	Israel Chango	19	2006	57	1	
53	MF	(Ecuador)	Eduardo Bone	18	2007	2	0	
54	MF	(Ecuador)	Cristhian Hurtado	18	2008	1	0	
55	MF	(Ecuador)	Pedro Romo	18	2008	1	0	
56	DF	(Ecuador)	Galo Corozo	18	2009	0	0	
58	MF	(Ecuador)	Efren de la Cruz	18	2008	1	0	
-	MF	(Ecuador)	Jefferson Lara	18	2008	16	0	

Note: Caps and goals are of the national league and are current as of the beginning of the season.

=== Copa Libertadores squad ===
No.	Pos.	Nation	Player
1	GK	ECU	José Francisco Cevallos
2	DF	ARG	Norberto Araujo
3	DF	ECU	Renán Calle
4	DF	ECU	Paúl Ambrosi
5	MF	ECU	Alfonso Obregón
6	FW	URU	Richard Morales
7	MF	ECU	Miler Bolaños
8	MF	ECU	Patricio Urrutia (captain)
9	FW	ECU	Walter Calderón
10	MF	ECU	Edder Vaca
11	FW	ECU	Franklin Salas
12	MF	ECU	Gabriel Espinosa
13	DF	ECU	Néicer Reasco

No.	Pos.	Nation	Player
14	MF	ECU	Diego Calderón
15	DF	ECU	William Araujo
16	FW	ARG	Claudio Bieler
17	FW	ECU	Danny Vera
18	MF	ECU	Ángel Cheme
19	FW	CHI	Reinaldo Navia
20	MF	ECU	Pedro Larrea
21	MF	ARG	Damián Manso
22	GK	ECU	Alexander Domínguez
23	DF	ECU	Jayro Campos
24	MF	ECU	Carlos Espínola
25	GK	ECU	Daniel Viteri

=== Recopa Sudamericana squad ===
No.	Pos.	Nation	Player
1	GK	ECU	José Francisco Cevallos
2	DF	ARG	Norberto Araujo
3	DF	ECU	Renán Calle
4	DF	ECU	Paúl Ambrosi
5	DF	ECU	Ulises de la Cruz
6	MF	ECU	Pedro Larrea
7	MF	ECU	Miler Bolaños
8	MF	ECU	Patricio Urrutia (captain)
9	FW	ECU	Walter Calderón
10	MF	ECU	Christian Lara
11	FW	ECU	Franklin Salas
12	MF	ECU	Gabriel Espinosa
13	DF	ECU	Néicer Reasco

No.	Pos.	Nation	Player
14	MF	ECU	Diego Calderón
15	DF	ECU	William Araujo
16	FW	ARG	Claudio Bieler
17	FW	ECU	Danny Vera
18	MF	ECU	Byron Camacho
19	FW	ARG	Claudio Graf
20	MF	PAR	Enrique Vera
21	MF	ECU	Pedro Romo
22	GK	ECU	Alexander Domínguez
23	DF	ECU	Jayro Campos
24	DF	ECU	Carlos Espínola
25	GK	ECU	Daniel Viteri

=== Copa Sudamericana squad ===
No.	Pos.	Nation	Player
1	GK	ECU	José Francisco Cevallos
2	DF	ARG	Norberto Araujo
3	DF	ECU	Renán Calle
4	DF	ECU	Paúl Ambrosi
5	DF	ECU	Ulises de la Cruz
6	MF	ECU	Pedro Larrea
7	MF	ECU	Miler Bolaños
8	MF	ECU	Patricio Urrutia
9	FW	ECU	Walter Calderón
10	MF	ECU	Christian Lara
11	FW	ECU	Franklin Salas
12	MF	ECU	Édison Méndez
13	DF	ECU	Néicer Reasco (captain)

No.	Pos.	Nation	Player
14	MF	ECU	Diego Calderón
15	DF	ECU	William Araujo
16	FW	ARG	Claudio Bieler
17	FW	ECU	Víctor Estupiñán
18	MF	ECU	Gabriel Espinosa
19	FW	ARG	Claudio Graf
20	MF	ECU	Alex Bolaños
21	MF	ECU	Pedro Romo
22	GK	ECU	Alexander Domínguez
23	DF	ECU	Jayro Campos
24	DF	ECU	Carlos Espínola
25	GK	ECU	Daniel Viteri
20	MF	PAR	Enrique Vera

:1.Alex Bolaños replaced Enrique Vera on November 11 due to injury.

=== Winter transfers ===
Players In
Name	Nat	Pos	Age	Moving from
Miler Bolaños	(Ecuador)	MF	18	(Ecuador) Barcelona
Walter Calderón	(Ecuador)	FW	31	(Ecuador) Deportivo Quito
Ángel Cheme	(Ecuador)	MF	24	(Ecuador) Olmedo
Carlos Espínola	(Ecuador)	DF	33	(Ecuador) Emelec
Henry León	(Ecuador)	MF	25	(Ecuador) ESPOLI
Richard Morales	(Uruguay)	FW	33	(Brazil) Grêmio
Danny Vera	(Ecuador)	FW	28	(Ecuador) Barcelona

Players Out
Name	Nat	Pos	Age	Moving to
Luis Bolaños	(Ecuador)	MF	23	(Brazil) Santos
Agustín Delgado	(Ecuador)	FW	34	(Ecuador) Emelec
Richard Morales	(Uruguay)	FW	34	Retired
Christian Suárez	(Ecuador)	MF	23	(Ecuador) Olmedo
Reinaldo Navia	(Chile)	FW	30	Released

=== Summer transfers ===
Players In
Name	Nat	Pos	Age	Moving from
Ulises de la Cruz	(Ecuador)	DF	35	Free Agent
Claudio Graf	(Argentina)	FW	33	(Mexico) UAG
Christian Lara	(Ecuador)	MF	29	(Colombia) Deportivo Pereira
Édison Méndez	(Ecuador)	MF	30	(Netherlands) PSV
Enrique Vera	(Paraguay)	MF	30	(Mexico) América
Alex Bolaños*	(Ecuador)	MF	24	Unattached
*Unable to play in the Serie A.

Players Out
Name	Nat	Pos	Age	Moving to
Paúl Ambrosi	(Ecuador)	DF	28	(Argentina) Rosario Central
Byron Camacho	(Ecuador)	MF	21	(Ecuador) Aucas (loan)
Henry León	(Ecuador)	MF	25	(Ecuador) Universidad Católica
Damián Manso	(Argentina)	MF	30	(Mexico) Pachuca
Patricio Urrutia	(Ecuador)	MF	30	(Brazil) Fluminense

== Competitions ==
=== Overall ===
Competition	Started round	Final position / round	First match	Last match
Serie A	First Stage	4th	Feb 1	Dec 6
Copa Libertadores	Second Stage	Second Stage	Feb 17	Apr 29
Recopa Sudamericana	Final	Winner	Jun 25	Jul 9
Copa Sudamericana	First Stage	Winner	Aug 11	Dec 2

=== Pre-season ===
LDU Quito played two preseason friendlies prior to the start of the Serie A season

January 17	LDU Quito	3 – 0	ESPOLI	Estadio Casa Blanca, Quito
10:00 (UTC-5)

January 20	El Nacional	2 – 2	LDU Quito	Deportivo "El Sauce", Tumbaco
10:00 (UTC-5)

La Noche Blanca is the club's official presentation for the season. They hosted Colombian club Santa Fe.

January 23 La Noche Blanca	LDU Quito (Ecuador)	2 – 0	(Colombia) Santa Fe	Estadio Casa Blanca, Quito
19:35 (UTC-5)	Bieler 46'; Urrutia 51' (pen.)	Article		Attendance: ≈20,000; Referee: Tomás Alarcón

=== Serie A ===
2009 is the club's 48th season in the top-level of professional football in Ecuador. The first game of the season began on January 31, with LDU Quito's first game on February 1.

==== First stage ====
The first stage was a double round-robin tournament. LDU Quito finished 2nd and qualified to the Third Stage with 2 bonus points.

Overall								Home						Away					
Pld	W	D	L	GF	GA	GD	Pts	W	D	L	GF	GA	GD	W	D	L	GF	GA	GD
22	12	6	4	44	20	+24	42	9	2	0	27	5	+22	3	4	4	17	15	+2

Last updated: July 12, 2009.
Source: Season's Wikipedia article

Round	1	2	3	4	5	6	7	8	9	10	11	12	13	14	15	16	17	18	19	20	21	22
Ground	H	A	H	A	H	A	H	A	H	A	H	A	H	A	H	AR	H	A	H	A	H	A
Result	D	L	W	D	W	L	W	W	W	L	W	D	W	L	W	D	D	D	W	W	W	W
Position	3	9	7	5	4	5	4	2	1	3	2	2	1	1	1	2	2	2	2	2	2	2

Updated to match(es) played on July 12, 2009. Source: Season's Wikipedia article
A = Away; H = Home; W = Win; D = Draw; L = Loss

February 1 Round 1	LDU Quito	1–1	Olmedo	Quito
11:30 (UTC-5)	Reasco 76'	Report	Méndez 26'	Stadium: Estadio Casa Blanca; Attendance: 6,331; Referee: José Luis Espinel

February 6 Round 2	LDU Portoviejo	2–1	LDU Quito	Portoviejo
20:30 (UTC-5)	Ojeda 12'; Pachi 58'	Report	Urrutia 84'	Stadium: Estadio Reales Tamarindos; Attendance: 9,050; Referee: Tomás Alarcón

February 13 Round 3	LDU Quito	2–1	Manta	Quito
19:30 (UTC-5)	Campos 44'; D. Vera 87'	Report	Palacios 40'	Stadium: Estadio Casa Blanca; Attendance: 1,033; Referee: Manuel Hidalgo

February 21 Round 4	El Nacional	1–1	LDU Quito	Quito
12:00 (UTC-5)	Sánchez 82'	Report	Bieler 3'	Stadium: Estadio Olímpico Atahualpa; Attendance: 14,322; Referee: José Carpio

February 28 Round 5	LDU Quito	4–0	Deportivo Quito	Quito
18:00 (UTC-5)	W. Calderón 2'; Bieler 8', 42'; Ambrosi 87'	Report		Stadium: Estadio Casa Blanca; Attendance: 12,671; Referee: Omar Ponce

March 16 Round 7	LDU Quito	3–2	ESPOLI	Quito
19:15 (UTC-5)	Espínola 26'; Bieler 47'; Manso 90+2'	Report	Morales 23'; Cañete 44'	Stadium: Estadio Casa Blanca; Attendance: 2,374; Referee: Carlos Vera

March 21 Round 8	Técnico Universitario	1–4	LDU Quito	Ambato
16:00 (UTC-5)	Wila 29'	Report	Bieler 4'; W. Calderón 35'; Bolaños 54'; W. Araujo 85'	Stadium: Estadio Bellavista; Attendance: 5,632; Referee: Omar Ponce

April 2 Round 6	Deportivo Cuenca	1–0	LDU Quito	Cuenca
19:00 (UTC-5)	Preciado 83'	Report		Stadium: Estadio Alejandro Serrano Aguilar; Attendance: 8,045; Referee: Miguel Hidalgo
Note: This match postponed due to Liga's participation in the Copa Libertadores.

April 5 Round 9	LDU Quito	1–0	Macará	Quito
11:30 (UTC-5)	D. Vera 75'	Report		Stadium: Estadio Casa Blanca; Attendance: 1,958; Referee: Daniel Salazar

April 12 Round 10	Barcelona	2–1	LDU Quito	Guayaquil
18:00 (UTC-5)	Mina 27'; Román 65'	Report	Bieler 47'	Stadium: Estadio Monumental Banco Pichincha; Attendance: 7,331; Referee: Carlos Vera

April 17 Round 11	LDU Quito	2–0	Emelec	Quito
19:30 (UTC-5)	E. Vaca 29'; Bieler 46' (pen.)	Report		Stadium: Estadio Casa Blanca; Attendance: 7,831; Referee: Omar Ponce

April 24 Round 12	Emelec	1–1	LDU Quito	Guayaquil
19:45 (UTC-5)	Rojas 90+5'	Report	Larrea 46'	Stadium: Estadio George Capwell; Attendance: 13,220; Referee: Tomás Alarcón

May 3 Round 13	LDU Quito	3–0	Barcelona	Quito
12:30 (UTC-5)	Bieler 8', 74'; W. Calderón 63'	Report		Stadium: Estadio Casa Blanca; Attendance: 20,210; Referee: Omar Ponce

May 10 Round 14	Macará	2–1	LDU Quito	Ambato
11:45 (UTC-5)	Garcés 71'; Figueroa 90+2'	Report	Ambrosi 5'	Stadium: Estadio Bellavista; Attendance: 4,718; Referee: Samuel Haro

May 16 Round 15	LDU Quito	4–0	Técnico Universitario	Quito
18:00 (UTC-5)	Reasco 51'; Bieler 63', 70'; W. Calderón 87'	Report		Stadium: Estadio Casa Blanca; Attendance: 1,740; Referee: Alfredo Intriago

May 23 Round 16	ESPOLI	2–2	LDU Quito	Ibarra
16:00 (UTC-5)	Ibarra 39'; Ribeiro 89'	Report	D. Vera 51'; Bieler 73'	Stadium: Estadio Olímpico; Attendance: 7,224; Referee: Diego Lara

May 31 Round 17	LDU Quito	1–1	Deportivo Cuenca	Quito
11:45 (UTC-5)	Bieler 70'	Report	Quiñónez 43'	Stadium: Estadio Casa Blanca; Referee: Samuel Haro

June 13 Round 18	Deportivo Quito	1–1	LDU Quito	Quito
16:00 (UTC-5)	Minda 43'	Report	D. Vera 6'	Stadium: Estadio Olímpico Atahualpa; Attendance: 13,464; Referee: Tomás Alarcón

June 21 Round 19	LDU Quito	2–0	El Nacional	Quito
18:00 (UTC-5)	Bieler 10', 25'	Report		Stadium: Estadio Casa Blanca; Attendance: 7,419; Referee: Carlos Vera

July 1 Round 20	Manta	0–2	LDU Quito	Manta
19:00 (UTC-5)		Report	D. Vera 11'; Bieler 72'	Stadium: Estadio Jocay; Attendance: 4,020; Referee: Daniel Salazar

July 5 Round 21	LDU Quito	4–0	LDU Portoviejo	Quito
12:00 (UTC-5)	W. Calderón 8', 78'; Bolaños 22'; Espínola 50'	Report		Stadium: Estadio Casa Blanca; Attendance: 5,401; Referee: Samuel Haro

July 12 Round 22	Olmedo	2–3	LDU Quito	Riobamba
12:00 (UTC-5)	Rivas 77'; C. Caicedo 87'	Report	W. Calderón 35', 60'; Bolaños 71'	Stadium: Estadio Olímpico; Attendance: 6,629; Referee: Carlos Vera

==== Second stage ====
Liga was placed into Group 1 with Barcelona, Deportivo Cuenca, El Nacional, LDU Portoviejo, and Macará. They will also play Deportivo Quito in a "clásico". They finished first in their group and earned an extra bonus point toward the Third Stage.

Overall								Home						Away					
Pld	W	D	L	GF	GA	GD	Pts	W	D	L	GF	GA	GD	W	D	L	GF	GA	GD
12	6	4	2	18	10	+8	22	3	3	0	10	3	+7	3	1	2	8	7	+1

Last updated: October 3, 2009.
Source: Season's Wikipedia article

Round	1	2	3	4	5	6	7	8	9	10	11	12
Ground	H	H	A	A	H	H	A	H	A	A	H	A
Result	D	W	D	W	D	W	W	D	W	L	W	L
Position	3	2	2	2	2	1	1	1	1	1	1	1

Updated to match(es) played on October 3, 2009. Source: Season's Wikipedia article
A = Away; H = Home; W = Win; D = Draw; L = Loss

July 18 Round 1	LDU Quito	2–2	Deportivo Cuenca	Quito
18:00 (UTC-5)	Bieler 46'; Graf 64'	Report	Matamoros 8'; Paredes 85'	Stadium: Estadio Casa Blanca; Attendance: 1,975; Referee: José Luis Espinel

August 2 Round 3	LDU Quito	1–0	El Nacional	Quito
11:30 (UTC-5)	Graf 67'	Report		Stadium: Estadio Casa Blanca; Attendance: 4,156; Referee: Tomás Alarcón

August 5 Round 2	Barcelona	1–1	LDU Quito	Guayaquil
19:00 (UTC-5)	Oyola 5'	Report	Ambrosi 56'	Stadium: Estadio Monumental Banco Pichincha; Attendance: 17,239; Referee: Carlos Vera
Note: This match was postponed due to Liga's participation in the 2009 Peace Cup.

August 16 Round 5	Macará	0–2	LDU Quito	Ambato
10:30 (UTC-5)		Report	Bieler 33' (pen.); Bolaños 55'	Stadium: Estadio Bellavista; Attendance: 4,473; Referee: José Carpio

August 19 Round 4	LDU Quito	0–0	Deportivo Quito	Quito
19:30 (UTC-5)		Report		Stadium: Estadio Casa Blanca; Attendance: 12,107; Referee: Daniel Salazar
Note: This match was postponed due to Liga's participation in the 2009 Copa Sudamericana.

August 22 Round 6	LDU Quito	2–0	LDU Portoviejo	Quito
17:00 (UTC-5)	Graf 75'; Bolaños 85'	Report		Stadium: Estadio Casa Blanca; Attendance: 1,508; Referee: Tomas Alarcón

August 29 Round 7	LDU Portoviejo	0–4	LDU Quito	Portoviejo
20:30 (UTC-5)		Report	Graf 32'; Bieler 56'; Bolaños 76'; Calle 90'	Stadium: Estadio Reales Tamarindos; Attendance: 3,210; Referee: José Carpio
Note: In this match, Miler Bolaños scored LDU Quito's 2,500th goal.

September 13 Round 8	LDU Quito	1–1	Macará	Quito
11:30 (UTC-5)	Reasco 19'	Report	Ferreyra 80'	Stadium: Estadio Casa Blanca; Attendance: 2,452; Referee: Diego Lara

September 16 Round 10	El Nacional	0–1	LDU Quito	Quito
19:15 (UTC-5)		Report	Reasco 55'	Stadium: Estadio Olímpico Atahualpa; Attendance: 6,504; Referee: Carlos Vera
Note: This match was moved forward due to Liga's Round of 16 match of the Copa Sudamericana.

September 19 Round 9	Deportivo Quito	3–0	LDU Quito	Quito
18:00 (UTC-5)	Borghello 17', 41'; Pirchio 21'	Report		Stadium: Estadio Olímpico Atahualpa; Attendance: 15,229; Referee: Tomas Alarcón

September 27 Round 11	LDU Quito	4–0	Barcelona	Quito
12:00 (UTC-5)	Bieler 33', 47'; Campos 68'; Graf 76'	Report		Stadium: Estadio Casa Blanca; Attendance: 24,919; Referee: Daniel Salazar

October 3 Round 12	Deportivo Cuenca	3–0	LDU Quito	Cuenca
16:00 (UTC-5)	Matamoros 35', 80'; Preciado 58'	Report		Stadium: Estadio Alejandro Serrano Aguilar; Attendance: 9,504; Referee: José Luis Espinel

==== Third stage ====
LDU Quito has qualified to the third stage twice, and has earned 3 bonus points for this stage. They are placed into Group 1 with Deportivo Quito, Macará, and Manta. This stage is scheduled to begin on October 18 and end on November 22.

Overall								Home						Away					
Pld	W	D	L	GF	GA	GD	Pts	W	D	L	GF	GA	GD	W	D	L	GF	GA	GD
6	1	3	2	4	2	+2	9^{1}	1	1	1	4	1	+3	0	2	1	0	1	−1

Last updated: November 22, 2009.
Source: Season's Wikipedia article
1. LDU Quito has an additional three bonus points earned in the First and Second Stage.

Round	1	2	3	4	5	6
Ground	H	A	A	H	H	A
Result	W	D	D	D	L	L
Position	1	1	2	2	2	2

Updated to match(es) played on November 22, 2009. Source: Season's Wikipedia article
A = Away; H = Home; W = Win; D = Draw; L = Loss

October 16 Round 1	LDU Quito	4–0	Manta	Quito
19:30 (UTC-5)	Bieler 15'; Graf 18'; W. Araujo 34'; Salas 90+1'	Report		Stadium: Estadio Casa Blanca; Attendance: 1,765; Referee: Alfredo Intriago

October 25 Round 2	Deportivo Quito	0–0	LDU Quito	Quito
12:00 (UTC-5)		Report		Stadium: Estadio Olímpico Atahualpa; Attendance: 21,396; Referee: Tomás Alarcón

October 31 Round 3	Macará	0–0	LDU Quito	Ambato
16:00 (UTC-5)		Report		Stadium: Estadio Bellavista; Attendance: 4,967; Referee: Carlos Vera

November 8 Round 4	LDU Quito	0–0	Macará	Quito
11:30 (UTC-5)		Report		Stadium: Estadio Casa Blanca; Attendance: 19,053; Referee: Samuel Haro

November 16 Round 5	LDU Quito	0–1	Deportivo Quito	Quito
15:45 (UTC-5)		Report	Borghello 6'	Stadium: Estadio Casa Blanca; Attendance: 14,316; Referee: Carlos Vera

November 22 Round 6	Manta	1–0	LDU Quito	Manta
12:00 (UTC-5)	López 90'	Report		Stadium: Estadio Jocay; Attendance: 310; Referee: José Caprio

==== Fourth stage ====
Liga qualified to the third-place playoff of the fourth stage. They competed against Emelec for third-place and a berth in the 2010 Copa Libertadores first stage.

November 29	Emelec	1–0	LDU Quito	Guayaquil
12:00 (UTC-5)	Peirone 11'	Report		Stadium: Estadio George Capwell; Attendance: 6,352; Referee: Omar Ponce

December 7	LDU Quito	0–1	Emelec	Quito
16:00 (UTC-5)		Report	Rojas 83'	Stadium: Estadio Casa Blanca; Attendance: 17,106; Referee: Miguel Hidalgo

=== Copa Libertadores ===
As the defending champion, LDU Quito automatically earned a berth in this year's tournament. This was the 14th time the club participated in the continent's premier club tournament. They were drawn into the Group 1 along with 2008 Copa do Brasil winner Sport Recife, the Chilean 2008 Clausura champion Colo-Colo, and the winner of the 5th preliminary match Palmeiras. The Group stage began on February 11, with LDU Quito's first game on February 17.

LDU Quito started their title defense on a high note with a 3–2 home win against Palmeiras. This win was followed by two successive shut-out away losses in Recife and Santiago. A close home draw followed against Colo-Colo. Their last two matches were losses away and at home. They were eliminated from the competition on April 22 when Colo-Colo lost to Sport Recife.

Pos	Team	Pld	W	D	L	GF	GA	GD	Pts
1	(Brazil) Sport Recife	6	4	1	1	10	7	+3	13
2	(Brazil) Palmeiras	6	3	1	2	9	7	+2	10
3	(Chile) Colo-Colo	6	2	1	3	9	7	+2	7
4	(Ecuador) LDU Quito	6	1	1	4	6	13	−7	4

February 17	LDU Quito (Ecuador)	3–2	(Brazil) Palmeiras	Estadio Casa Blanca, Quito
17:00 (UTC-5)	W. Calderón 23', 34'; Manso 58'	Report	Willians 28'; Edmílson 46'	Referee: Wilmar Roldán (Colombia)

March 4	Sport Recife (Brazil)	2–0	(Ecuador) LDU Quito	Estádio Adelmar da Costa Carvalho (Ilha do Retiro), Recife
21:50 (UTC-3)	Daniel 13'; Paulo Baier 72' (pen.)	Report		Attendance: 20,184; Referee: Jorge Larrionda (Uruguay)

March 12	Colo-Colo (Chile)	3–0	(Ecuador) LDU Quito	Estadio Monumental David Arellano, Santiago
21:15 (UTC-4)	Carranza 56'; Cereceda 61'; Barrios 65'	Report		Referee: Carlos Amarilla (Paraguay)

April 9	LDU Quito (Ecuador)	1–1	(Chile) Colo-Colo	Estadio Casa Blanca, Quito
15:00 (UTC-5)	Campos 48'	Report	Bieler 90+2' (o.g.)	Referee: Armando Archundia (Mexico)

April 21	Palmeiras (Brazil)	2–0	(Ecuador) LDU Quito	Estádio Palestra Itália (Parque Antarctica), São Paulo
20:15 (UTC-3)	Marcão 48'; Diego Souza 83'	Report		Attendance: 19,205; Referee: Jorge Larrionda (Uruguay)

April 29	LDU Quito (Ecuador)	2–3	(Brazil) Sport Recife	Estadio Casa Blanca, Quito
19:50 (UTC-5)	Espínola 2'; D. Vera 41'	Report	Andrade 23', 77'; Igor 58'	Referee: Juan Soto (Venezuela)

=== Recopa Sudamericana ===
As the 2008 Copa Libertadores champion, LDU Quito qualified for this year's Recopa Sudamericana. They played against the 2008 Copa Sudamericana winner Sport Club Internacional in a two-legged match-up. This is LDU Quito's first Recopa Sudamericana. Internacional previously won the competition in 2007. The first leg was played at Internacional's stadium, Beira-Rio in Porto Alegre. Argentine Claudio Bieler provided the lone goal of the game for Liga. The second leg, played back in Quito at La Casa Blanca, was won decisively by the home team 3 goals to none. Carlos Espínola, Claudio Bieler, and recently signed Enrique Vera provided the scores for Liga. The Recopa title is LDU Quito's second international title.

June 25	Internacional (Brazil)	0–1	(Ecuador) LDU Quito	Porto Alegre, Brazil
21:50 (UTC-3)		Report	Bieler 57'	Stadium: Estádio José Pinheiro Borba (Beira-Rio); Attendance: 30,284; Referee: Juan Soto (Venezuela)

July 9	LDU Quito (Ecuador)	3–0	(Brazil) Internacional	Quito, Ecuador
19:50 (UTC-5)	Espínola 10'; Bieler 40'; E. Vera 57'	Report		Stadium: Estadio Casa Blanca; Referee: Carlos Chandía (Chile)

=== Copa Sudamericana ===
LDU Quito qualified for the 2009 Copa Sudamericana on July 5. By finishing 2nd in the First Stage of the Serie A, Liga earned the Ecuador 2 berth and started in the First Stage of the competition. Liga's opponent in the First Stage is Paraguayan club Libertad. The first leg was played at home at La Casa Blanca. Néicer Reasco scored the only goal of the match in stoppage time of the first half. The second leg, played in Asunción on August 25, ended in a draw. Javier González put the home team ahead in the first half. Édison Méndez scored a second half goal to keep LDU Quito the overall advantage. Liga's Round of 16 tie against Lanús opened at home. Argentine striker Claudio Bieler scored a hat-trick in the first half before Édison Méndez scored the final goal at the end of regulation time to give Liga a four-goal advantage going into the second leg. In second leg, Lanús came out strong, but were unable to get one past goalkeeper Alexander Domínguez. Claudio Bieler finally broke the tie in the 71st minute with a long-range free-kick from outside the box. Santiago Salcedo tied it for the home team before the end of regulation. LDU Quito advanced to the quarterfinals 4–1 on points. In the quarterfinals, Liga played Vélez Sársfield, also from Argentina. In both games, Liga came from behind to get favorable results. In the first leg in Buenos Aires, Hernán Rodrigo López scored first for the locals to give them the lead. A brilliant play by Néicer Reasco led to a pass to Claudio Bieler who scored the equalizer, from the floor after being tripped, to give Liga an away goal and the tie. The second leg in Quito started the same after Hernán Rodrigo López scored first for Vélez to give them the overall advantage. But Enrique Vera and Carlos Espínola scored in the second half to give Liga the win and a place in the semifinals. In the semifinals, Liga played River Plate from Montevideo, Uruguay. The first leg of the semifinal was played at the famed Estadio Centenario. River took the first leg 2–1 when Jorge Córdoba scored the winner in the second half of the match. Liga avenged their first loss in the tournament with a lopsided 7–0 win at home. Claudio Bieler scored another hat-trick in the tournament, in addition to goals from Carlos Espínola, Ulises de la Cruz, Miler Bolaños, and Édison Méndez. The win at home is officially the most lopsided win in the history of the tournament. Liga will play Brazilian club Fluminense in the Finals. This is a repeat of the 2008 Copa Libertadores Final. The first leg was played at home. Marquinho scored within the first minute of the game for Fluminense to put them ahead early. However, Liga persisted and answered back with a hat-trick by Méndez in the 21', 44, and 60'. Franklin Salas and Ulises de la Cruz added two more in the 78' and 87' to give Liga a huge 5–1 win and a four-goal advantage going into the second leg. The second leg at Maracanã ended the same way it did in 2008: a Fluminense win. This time, Fluminense won 3–0 and was unable to overcome the four-goal difference. Liga won the Copa Sudamericana and become the Ecuadorian club to win CONMEBOL's three major tournaments.

August 11 First Stage	LDU Quito (Ecuador)	1–0	(Paraguay) Libertad	Quito, Ecuador
16:00 (UTC-5)	Reasco 45'	Report		Stadium: Estadio Casa Blanca; Attendance: 6,786; Referee: José Buitrago (Colombia)

August 25 First Stage	Libertad (Paraguay)	1–1	(Ecuador) LDU Quito	Asunción, Paraguay
19:15 (UTC-3)	González 32'	Report	Méndez 63'	Stadium: Estadio Defensores del Chaco; Referee: Paulo César de Oliveira (Brazil)

September 24 Round of 16	LDU Quito (Ecuador)	4–0	(Argentina) Lanús	Quito, Ecuador
16:00 (UTC-5)	Bieler 5', 7', 26' (pen.); Méndez 90+1' (pen.)	Report		Stadium: Estadio Casa Blanca; Referee: Wilmar Roldán (Colombia)

October 1 Round of 16	Lanús (Argentina)	1–1	(Ecuador) LDU Quito	Lanús, Argentina
19:15 (UTC-3)	Salcedo 76'	Report	Bieler 71'	Stadium: Estadio Ciudad de Lanús – Néstor Díaz Pérez; Referee: Juan Soto (Venezuela)

October 20 Quarterfinals	Vélez Sarsfield (Argentina)	1–1	(Ecuador) LDU Quito	Buenos Aires, Argentina
21:30 (UTC-3)	López 5'	Report	Bieler 52'	Stadium: José Amalfitani Stadium; Attendance: 7,606; Referee: Paulo César de Oliveira (Brazil)

November 5 Quarterfinals	LDU Quito (Ecuador)	2–1	(Argentina) Vélez Sarsfield	Quito, Ecuador
20:50 (UTC-5)	Vera 68'; Espínola 75'	Report	López 44'	Stadium: Estadio Casa Blanca; Referee: Carlos Chandía (Chile)

November 12 Semifinals	River Plate (Uruguay)	2–1	(Ecuador) LDU Quito	Montevideo, Uruguay
21:15 (UTC-2)	Porta 9'; Córdoba 60'	Report	Méndez 34'	Stadium: Estadio Centenario; Referee: Carlos Simon (Brazil)

November 19 Semifinals	LDU Quito (Ecuador)	7–0	(Uruguay) River Plate	Quito, Ecuador
19:15 (UTC-5)	Bieler 18', 83', 89'; Espínola 28'; Bolaños 45+2'; Méndez 57' de la Cruz 77'	Report		Stadium: Estadio Casa Blanca; Referee: Óscar Ruiz (Colombia)

November 25 Finals	LDU Quito (Ecuador)	5–1	(Brazil) Fluminense	Quito, Ecuador
18:50 (UTC-5)	Méndez 21', 44', 60'; Salas 78' de la Cruz 87'	Report	Marquinho 1'	Stadium: Estadio Casa Blanca; Referee: Roberto Silvera (Uruguay)

December 2 Finals	Fluminense (Brazil)	3–0	(Ecuador) LDU Quito	Rio de Janeiro, Brazil
21:50 (UTC-3)	Dieguinho 14'; Fred 44'; Gum 72'			Stadium: Maracanã Stadium; Referee: Carlos Amarilla (Paraguay)

=== Peace Cup ===
LDU Quito were invited to participate in the 2009 Peace Cup, a friendly international club tournament organized by Sunmoon Peace Football Foundation, in Spain. For the group stage, they were drawn into Group B with Saudi Al-Ittihad and Spanish giants Real Madrid.

Team	Pld	W	D	L	GF	GA	GD	Pts	Qualification
(Spain) Real Madrid	2	1	1	0	5	3	+2	4	Advance to the semi-finals
(Ecuador) LDU Quito	2	1	0	1	5	5	0	3	
(Saudi Arabia) Al-Ittihad	2	0	1	1	2	4	−2	1	

July 24	LDU Quito (Ecuador)	3–1	(Saudi Arabia) Al-Ittihad	Jerez, Spain
20:30 (UTC+2)	Reasco 20'; Ambrosi 40'; Graf 72'		Kariri 74'	Stadium: Estadio Municipal de Chapín; Referee: Eduardo Iturralde González (Spain)

July 28	Real Madrid (Spain)	4–2	(Ecuador) LDU Quito	Madrid, Spain
2:30 (UTC+2)	C. Ronaldo 48' (pen.); Granero 53'; Metzelder 71'; Negredo 90+2'		E. Vera 68', 86'	Stadium: Estadio Santiago Bernabéu; Referee: Kevin Blom (Netherlands)

== Statistics ==
Num	Pos	Player	Serie A				Copa Libertadores				Recopa Sudamericana				Copa Sudamericana				Total			
Num	Pos	Player	App	Goal	Yellow card	Red card	App	Goal	Yellow card	Red card	App	Goal	Yellow card	Red card	App	Goal	Yellow card	Red card	App	Goal	Yellow card	Red card
1	GK	José Francisco Cevallos	17	-	4	1	4	-	1	1	1	-	-	-	-	-	-	-	22	-	5	2
2	DF	Norberto Araujo	27	-	4	1	4	-	1	-	2	-	1	-	10	-	1	-	43	-	7	1
3	DF	Renán Calle	18	-	6	4	6	-	2	-	1	-	1	-	2	-	-	-	27	-	9	4
4	DF	Ulises de la Cruz	16	-	1	-	-	-	-	-	2	-	1	-	10	2	-	1	28	2	2	1
5	MF	Alfonso Obregón	7	-	-	-	2	-	-	-	-	-	-	-	-	-	-	-	9	-	-	-
6	DF	Pedro Larrea	21	1	3	1	4	-	2	-	1	-	-	-	4	-	1	-	30	1	6	1
8	MF	Édison Méndez	8	-	1	-	-	-	-	-	-	-	-	-	10	7	3	-	18	7	4	-
9	FW	Walter Calderón	28	8	7	1	4	2	2	-	-	-	-	-	4	-	1	-	36	10	10	1
10	MF	Christian Lara	14	-	1	-	-	-	-	-	2	-	-	-	5	-	-	-	21	-	1	-
11	MF	Franklin Salas	21	1	1	-	1	-	-	1	-	-	-	-	2	1	-	-	24	2	1	1
13	MF	Néicer Reasco	33	4	4	-	6	-	3	-	2	-	1	-	10	1	2	-	51	5	10	-
14	DF	Diego Calderón	32	-	10	-	6	-	-	1	-	-	-	-	10	-	3	-	48	-	13	1
15	DF	William Araujo	31	2	5	-	5	-	3	-	1	-	-	-	10	-	2	-	47	2	10	-
16	FW	Claudio Bieler	32	22	11	3	4	-	2	-	2	2	-	-	10	8	2	-	48	32	15	3
17	FW	Danny Vera	24	5	1	-	3	1	-	-	-	-	-	-	-	-	-	-	27	6	1	-
18	MF	Ángel Cheme	12	-	2	-	2	-	-	-	-	-	-	-	1	-	-	-	15	-	2	-
19	FW	Claudio Graf	17	6	5	-	-	-	-	-	2	-	-	-	8	-	-	-	27	6	5	-
20	MF	Enrique Vera	9	-	7	-	-	-	-	-	2	1	-	-	5	1	4	-	16	2	11	-
20	MF	Alex Bolaños	-	-	-	-	-	-	-	-	-	-	-	-	1	-	-	-	1	-	-	-
22	GK	Alexander Domínguez	24	-	5	-	2	-	-	-	2	-	-	-	10	-	4	-	38	-	9	-
23	DF	Jayro Campos	29	2	9	1	6	1	-	-	2	-	1	-	8	-	4	2	45	3	14	3
24	MF	Gabriel Espinosa	5	-	1	-	1	-	-	-	-	-	-	-	-	-	-	-	6	-	1	-
25	GK	Daniel Viteri	1	-	-	-	2	-	-	-	-	-	-	-	-	-	-	-	3	-	-	-
27	MF	Víctor Estupiñán	8	-	1	-	-	-	-	-	-	-	-	-	3	-	1	-	11	-	2	-
33	DF	Carlos Espínola	22	3	4	-	3	1	2	-	2	1	1	-	10	2	3	-	37	7	10	-
50	MF	Danny Vaca	6	-	-	-	-	-	-	-	-	-	-	-	-	-	-	-	6	-	-	-
51	MF	Miler Bolaños	35	6	12	-	2	-	-	1	-	-	-	-	5	1	-	-	42	7	12	1
52	MF	Israel Chango	7	-	1	-	-	-	-	-	-	-	-	-	-	-	-	-	7	-	1	-
53	MF	Eduardo Bone	3	-	-	-	-	-	-	-	-	-	-	-	-	-	-	-	3	-	-	-
54	MF	Cristhian Hurtado	1	-	-	-	-	-	-	-	-	-	-	-	-	-	-	-	1	-	-	-
54	MF	Jefferson Lara	1	-	-	-	-	-	-	-	-	-	-	-	-	-	-	-	1	-	-	-
55	MF	Pedro Romo	10	-	2	-	-	-	-	-	-	-	-	-	-	-	-	-	10	-	2	-
56	MF	Galo Corozo	1	-	1	-	-	-	-	-	-	-	-	-	-	-	-	-	1	-	1	-
58	MF	Efren de la Cruz	1	-	-	-	-	-	-	-	-	-	-	-	-	-	-	-	1	-	-	-
4	DF	Paúl Ambrosi	23	2	5	-	4	-	1	-	2	-	1	-	2	-	-	-	31	2	7	-
8	MF	Patricio Urrutia	18	1	4	-	4	-	1	-	2	-	-	-	-	-	-	-	24	1	5	-
10	FW	Edder Vaca	4	1	-	1	3	-	-	-	-	-	-	-	-	-	-	-	7	1	-	1
21	MF	Damián Manso	14	1	3	-	4	1	-	-	-	-	-	-	-	-	-	-	18	2	3	-
19	FW	Reinaldo Navia	2	-	-	-	-	-	-	-	-	-	-	-	-	-	-	-	2	-	-	-
34	FW	Richard Morales	3	-	-	-	2	-	-	-	-	-	-	-	-	-	-	-	5	-	-	-
Totals			-	65	121	13	-	6	20	4	-	4	7	-	-	23	31	3	-	98	179	20

== See also ==
- 2009 in Ecuadorian football
