= 2009 Copa Sudamericana finals =

- Event: 2009 Copa Sudamericana
LDU Quito	Fluminense
(Ecuador)	(Brazil)
5	4
- on aggregate

First leg
LDU Quito	Fluminense
5	1
- Date: 25 November 2009
- Venue: Estadio Casa Blanca, Quito
- Man of the Match: Édison Méndez
- Referee: Roberto Silvera (Uruguay)
- Attendance: 55,000

Second leg
Fluminense	LDU Quito
3	0
- Date: 2 December 2009
- Venue: Estádio do Maracanã, Rio de Janeiro
- Man of the Match: Claudio Bieler
- Referee: Carlos Amarilla (Paraguay)
- Attendance: 65,822

The 2009 Copa Sudamericana finals was a two-legged football match-up to determine the 2009 Copa Sudamericana champion. It was contested by Ecuadorian club LDU Quito and Brazilian club Fluminense. Both teams were playing in their first Copa Sudamericana finals. The first leg was played in Estadio Casa Blanca in Quito on 25 November, and the host team LDU Quito won 5–1. The second leg was played in Estádio Mário Filho, better known as Maracanã, in Rio de Janeiro on 2 December and the host team Fluminese won 3–0, but LDU Quito won 5–4 on aggregate and was thus crowned the champions. Coincidentally, the finals were a rematch of the 2008 Copa Libertadores finals, which were contested under similar circumstances 17 months prior to the day.

== Qualified teams ==
Team	Previous finals app.
(Ecuador) LDU Quito	None
(Brazil) Fluminense	None

== Rules ==
The final was played over two legs; home and away. The higher seeded team played the second leg at home. The team that accumulated the most points —three for a win, one for a draw, zero for a loss— after the two legs was crowned the champion. The away-goals rule was not used. Should the two teams be tied on points after the second leg, the team with the best goal difference won. If the two teams had equal goal difference, extra time would be used. The extra time consisted of two 15-minute halves. If the tie was still not broken, a penalty shoot-out would ensue according to the Laws of the Game.

== Route to the finals ==
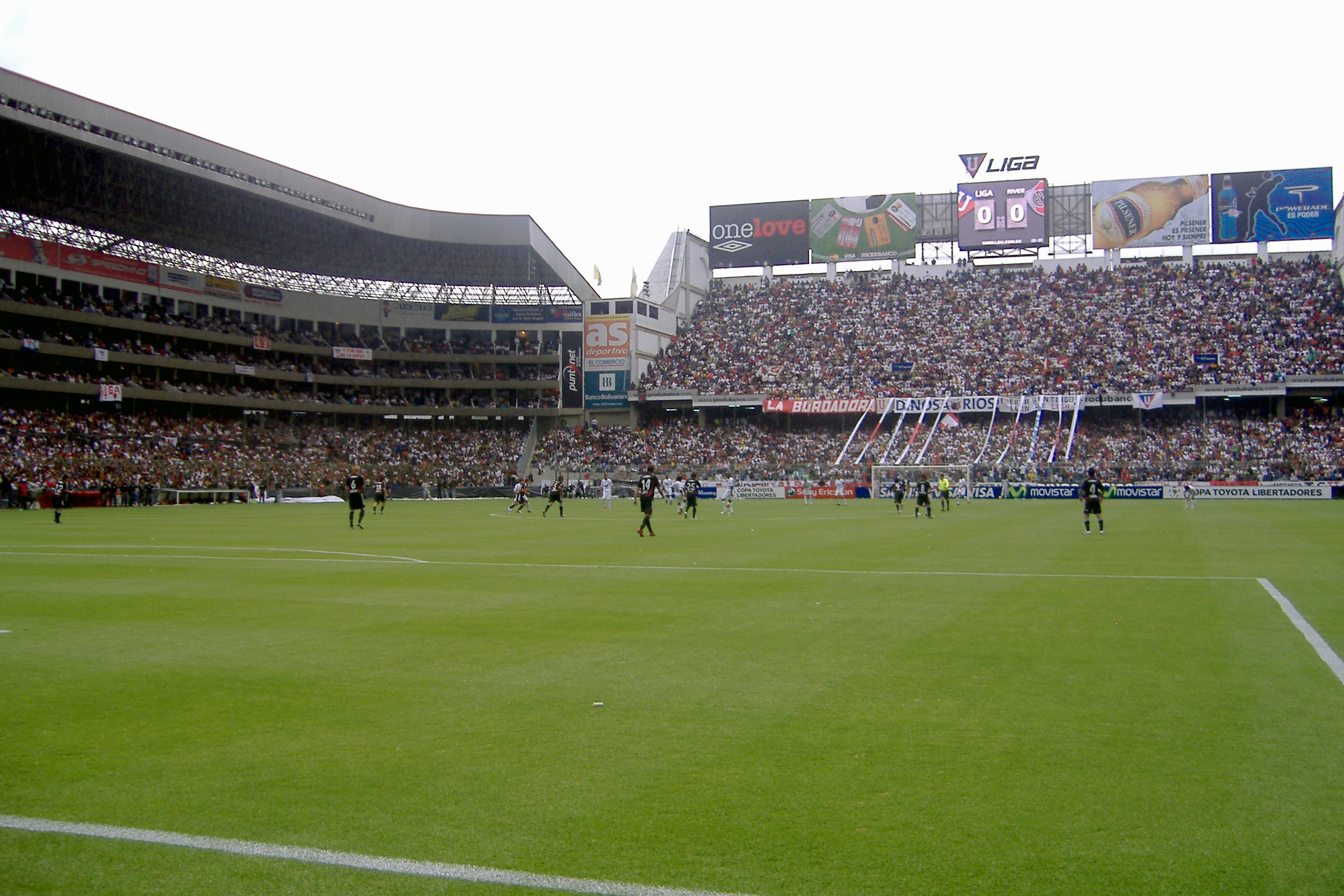
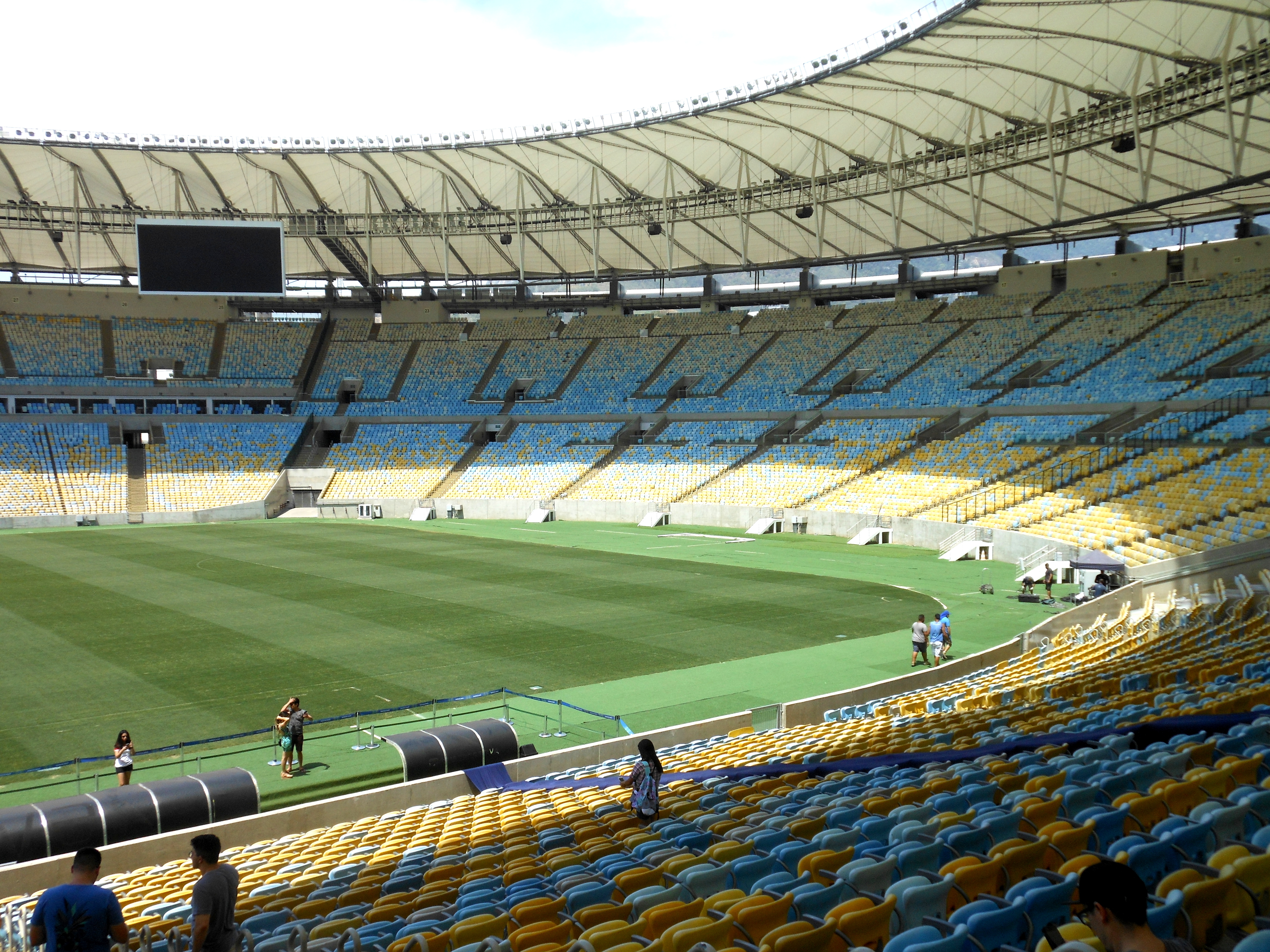
Estadio Casa Blanca (left) and Estadio do Maracaná, venues for the Series

Both teams entered the competition in the First Stage. Fluminense qualified after finishing 14th in the 2008 Campeonato Brasileiro Série A. LDU Quito qualified after finishing second in the First Stage of the 2009 Campeonato Ecuatoriano de Fútbol Serie A.

=== Fluminense's route ===
Fluminense's First Stage was bitter cross-town rival Flamengo. Both matches of the Fla-Flu in the tournament were held Maracanã, and both ended in a draw (0–0 and 1–1, respectively). Fluminense, as the designated away in the second leg, advanced on an away goal by Roni. For winning Qualifier O5 of the First Stage, Fluminense was awarded the 5 seed for the Round of 16 onward.

Their Round of 16 rival was Peruvian club Alianza Atlético. The first leg, held in Estadio Miguel Grau in Piura, ended in a 2–2 draw. Flu's goals were scored by Luiz Alberto and Conca. The second leg, held in Maracanã, ended in a decisive 4–1 for Fluminense. Conca, Alan, and Adeílson (twice) made the scores for the Brazilians, and passage to the Quarterfinals.

Their Quarterfinals rival was Chilean club Universidad de Chile. The first leg, at Maracanã, ended in another draw (2–2). Fred scored twice for Fluminense. In the second leg, held at Estadio Santa Laura in Santiago, Fred scored the lone goal of the match to give Fluminense passage to the Semifinals.

Fluminense's Semifinal rival was Paraguayan club Cerro Porteño. The first leg was held at Estadio General Pablo Rojas, nicknamed La Olla, in Asunción, and ended in a 1–0 for Fluminense. Fred scored his fourth goal in three matches for the advantage. In the second leg at Maracanã, Fluminense trailed for most of the game thanks to a Cerro Porteño goal by Luis Cáceres. However, Gum and Alan each scored a goal for Fluminense in stoppage time of the second half to give Flu the win and passage to the finals.

=== LDU Quito's route ===
LDU Quito's First Stage rival was Paraguayan club Libertad. The first leg, held in Estadio Casa Blanca in Quito, ended in a 1–0 win for Liga. Team captain Néicer Reasco scored the goal for the home team. The second leg, held back in Asunción at the Estadio Defensores del Chaco, ended in a 1–1 tie. Édison Méndez scored the come from behind goal for Liga to give them passage to the Round of 16, and the 10 seed.

Liga played the Round of 16 against Argentine club Lanús. The first leg, held in Quito, was a goal-fest for Liga. A hat-trick by Claudio Bieler and a goal by Édison Méndez gave LDU Quito a 4–0 win and a significant advantage in the next leg. The second leg, held in Estadio Ciudad de Lanús, ended in a 1–1 draw. Claudio Bieler again scored for Liga.

LDU Quito Quarterfinal rival was defending Argentine champion Vélez Sarsfield. The first leg, held in Estadio José Amalfitani in Buenos Aires, ended in a 1–1 draw. Claudio Bieler again scored for Liga, who were trailing to give them the draw. The second leg, held back in Quito, ended in 2–1 win for the home team. Initially trailing 1–0, goals by Enrique Vera and Carlos Espínola gave LDU Quito passage to the Semifinals.

Liga's Semifinal rival was Uruguayan club River Plate. The first leg, held at the Estadio Centenario in Montevideo, ended in a 2–1 loss for LDU Quito. Édison Méndez scored the lone goal for Liga. The second leg, held back in Quito, ended in a hugely one-sided 7–0 win for LDU Quito. The goals were provided by Claudio Bieler (hat-trick), Carlos Espínola, Miller Bolaños, Édison Méndez, and Ulises de la Cruz.

=== Summary ===
Fluminense			LDU Quito	
Opponent	Goalscorers		Opponent	Goalscorers
(Brazil) Flamengo; H 0–0		First Stage; First leg	(Paraguay) Libertad; H 1–0	Néicer Reasco
(Brazil) Flamengo; A 1–1	Roni	Second leg	(Paraguay) Libertad; A 1–1	Édison Méndez
(Peru) Alianza Atlético; A 2–2	Luiz Alberto; Darío Conca	Round of 16; First leg	(Argentina) Lanús; H 4–0	Claudio Bieler (3); Édison Méndez
(Peru) Alianza Atlético; H 4–1	Conca; Alan; Adeílson (2)	Second leg	(Argentina) Lanús; A 1–1	Claudio Bieler
(Chile) Universidad de Chile; H 2–2	Fred (2)	Quarter-finals; First leg	(Argentina) Vélez Sársfield; A 1–1	Claudio Bieler
(Chile) Universidad de Chile; A 0–1	Fred	Second leg	(Argentina) Vélez Sársfield; H 2–1	Enrique Vera; Carlos Espínola
(Paraguay) Cerro Porteño; A 0–1	Fred	Semi-finals; First leg	(Uruguay) River Plate; A 2–1	Édison Méndez
(Paraguay) Cerro Porteño; H 2–1	Gum; Alan	Second leg	(Uruguay) River Plate; H 7–0	Claudio Bieler (3); Édison Méndez; Carlos Espínola; Miller Bolaños; Ulises de la Cruz

Fluminense's Record
Team	Pld	W	D	L	GF	GA	GD	Pts	Eff
(Brazil) Fluminense	8	4	4	0	13	7	+6	16	66.67%

LDU Quito's Record
Team	Pld	W	D	L	GF	GA	GD	Pts	Eff
(Ecuador) LDU Quito	8	4	3	1	18	6	+12	15	62.50%

== Matches ==
=== First leg ===
The first leg, played at Estadio Casa Blanca in Quito, began much like it did in 2008: with a quick goal. This time, Fluminense quickly struck first with a goal by Marquinho in the first minute. Liga answered back with a hat-trick by Édison Méndez, who made two powerful long-range shots (21st and 44th minutes) and a header (60th minute). He later assisted Franklin Salas' goal in the 78th minute. Ulises de la Cruz capped off the scoring with another long-range shot from outside the box in the 87th minute. The win gave Liga a favorable 4-goal advantage going into the second leg.

2009 Copa Sudamericana final
25 November 2009
18:50 (UTC-5)
First leg

LDU Quito (Ecuador)	5–1	(Brazil) Fluminense
Méndez 21', 44', 60'; Salas 78' de la Cruz 87'	Report	Marquinho 1'

Estadio Casa Blanca, Quito
Attendance: 55,000
Referee: Roberto Silvera (Uruguay)

LDU Quito	Fluminense

GK	22	(Ecuador) Alexander Domínguez
DF	13	(Ecuador) Néicer Reasco (c)
DF	2	(Argentina) Norberto Araujo
DF	24	(Paraguay) Carlos Espínola		(yellow card) 30'
DF	14	(Ecuador) Diego Calderón
DF	5	(Ecuador) Ulises de la Cruz
MF	15	(Ecuador) William Araujo
MF	7	(Ecuador) Miller Bolaños	(substituted off) 69'
MF	12	(Ecuador) Édison Méndez	(substituted off) 84'
FW	16	(Argentina) Claudio Bieler
FW	9	(Ecuador) Walter Calderón	(substituted off) 68'	(yellow card) 39'
Substitutes:
GK	1	(Ecuador) José Francisco Cevallos
DF	3	(Ecuador) Renán Calle
MF	4	(Ecuador) Gonzalo Chila	(substituted on) 84'
MF	6	(Ecuador) Pedro Larrea
MF	10	(Ecuador) Christian Lara
FW	11	(Ecuador) Franklin Salas	(substituted on) 69'
FW	19	(Argentina) Claudio Graf	(substituted on) 68'
Manager:
(Uruguay) Jorge Fossati

GK	22	(Brazil) Rafael		(yellow card) 51'
DF	6	(Brazil) Gum		(yellow card) 61'
DF	3	(Brazil) Cássio
DF	25	(Brazil) Dalton
MF	14	(Brazil) Mariano	(substituted off) 71'
MF	7	(Brazil) Diguinho	(substituted off) 59'
MF	5	(Brazil) Diogo
MF	11	(Argentina) Darío Conca
MF	8	(Brazil) Marquinho		(yellow card) 21'
FW	18	(Brazil) Alan	(substituted off) 46'
FW	20	(Brazil) Fred (c)
Substitutes:
GK	12	(Brazil) Ricardo Berna
DF	2	(Brazil) Ruy	(substituted on) 71'
FW	9	(Brazil) Kieza	(substituted on) 46'
DF	19	(Brazil) João Paulo
MF	21	(Brazil) Maurício	(substituted on) 59'
FW	24	(Brazil) Adeílson
Manager:
(Brazil) Cuca

Man of the Match:
(Ecuador) Édison Méndez (LDU Quito)
Assistant referees:
(Uruguay) Pablo Fandiño
(Uruguay) Wálter Rial
Fourth official:
(Uruguay) Darío Ubríaco

=== Second leg ===
The match started with a goal scored by Diguinho in the 14th minute. When LDU Quito player Ulises de la Cruz was given a red card in the 18th minute, Fluminense increased the pressure on the Ecuadorians. Two minutes before half-time, Fred scored the second for Fluminense. At half-time, Fluminense curiously stayed on the pitch. The second half continued with Fluminense continuing the pressure. Gum scored the third for the Brazilian side in the 72nd minute. The match grew more intensive as time went on. Fluminense captain Fred was sent-off in the 76th minute for arguing and touching the referee. LDU Quito defender Jairo Campos was shown his second yellow card 82nd minute and was ejected. With LDU Quito left with 9 players and Fluminense left with 10, Fluminense continued their search for the fourth goal, which would have sent the game into extra time. Fluminense never got the goal, and LDU Quito were crowned Copa Sudamericana champions for the first time.

2 December 2009
21:50 (UTC-2)
Second leg

Fluminense (Brazil)	3–0	(Ecuador) LDU Quito
Diguinho 14'; Fred 43'; Gum 72'	Report

Estádio Mário Filho (Maracanã), Rio de Janeiro
Attendance: 65,822
Referee: Carlos Amarilla (Paraguay)

Fluminense	LDU Quito

GK	22	(Brazil) Rafael
DF	6	(Brazil) Gum	(yellow card) 1'
DF	5	(Brazil) Diogo	(substituted off) 68'
DF	25	(Brazil) Dalton
MF	14	(Brazil) Mariano	(yellow card) 57' (substituted off) 88'
MF	7	(Brazil) Diguinho
MF	11	(Argentina) Darío Conca
MF	8	(Brazil) Marquinho
FW	18	(Brazil) Alan	(yellow card) 45+2'
FW	20	(Brazil) Fred (c)	(red card) 76'
FW	24	(Brazil) Adeílson	(substituted off) 57'
Substitutes:
GK	12	(Brazil) Ricardo Berna
DF	2	(Brazil) Ruy	(substituted on) 57'
FW	9	(Brazil) Kieza
MF	15	(Brazil) Raphael Augusto	(substituted on) 68'
DF	19	(Brazil) João Paulo
MF	21	(Brazil) Maurício	(substituted on) 88'
MF	23	(Brazil) Carlos Eduardo
Manager:
(Brazil) Cuca

GK	22	(Ecuador) Alexander Domínguez	(yellow card) 50'
DF	13	(Ecuador) Néicer Reasco (c)
DF	2	(Argentina) Norberto Araujo
DF	24	(Paraguay) Carlos Espínola
DF	23	(Ecuador) Jairo Campos	(yellow card) 4' (red card) 82'
DF	14	(Ecuador) Diego Calderón
MF	15	(Ecuador) William Araujo
MF	5	(Ecuador) Ulises de la Cruz	(red card) 18'
MF	12	(Ecuador) Édison Méndez
FW	16	(Argentina) Claudio Bieler	(substituted off) 89'
FW	9	(Ecuador) Walter Calderón	(substituted off) 27'
Substitutes:
GK	1	(Ecuador) José Francisco Cevallos
DF	3	(Ecuador) Renán Calle	(substituted on) 84'
MF	6	(Ecuador) Pedro Larrea	(substituted on) 27' (yellow card) 51' (substituted off) 84'
MF	10	(Ecuador) Christian Lara
FW	11	(Ecuador) Franklin Salas
FW	19	(Argentina) Claudio Graf
MF	20	(Ecuador) Alex Bolaños	(substituted on) 89'
Manager:
(Uruguay) Jorge Fossati

Man of the Match:
(Argentina) Claudio Bieler (LDU Quito)
Assistant referees:
(Paraguay) Emigdio Ruiz Roa
(Paraguay) Nicolás Yegrós
Fourth official:
(Paraguay) Antonio Arias
