= 2008 FIFA Club World Cup final =

- Event: 2008 FIFA Club World Cup
LDU Quito	Manchester United
(Ecuador)	(England)
0	1
- Date: 21 December 2008
- Venue: International Stadium, Yokohama
- Referee: Ravshan Irmatov (Uzbekistan)
- Attendance: 68,682
- Weather: Clear night 16 °C (61 °F); 69% humidity

The 2008 FIFA Club World Cup final was the final match of the 2008 FIFA Club World Cup, an association football tournament for the champion clubs from each of FIFA's six continental confederations. The match took place at the International Stadium Yokohama, Japan, on 21 December 2008, and pitted LDU Quito of Ecuador, the CONMEBOL club champions, and Manchester United of England, the UEFA club champions. Despite going down to ten men early in the second half, Manchester United won the match 1–0 thanks to a 73rd-minute goal from Wayne Rooney.

== Road to final ==
Both LDU Quito and Manchester United qualified for the competition at the semi-final stage, after winning their respective continental competition, the 2008 Copa Libertadores and the 2007–08 UEFA Champions League.

LDU Quito's opening game was against Mexican side Pachuca, who had defeated Egyptian club Al Ahly 4–2 in the quarter-finals after extra time. Their semi-final match was played at the National Stadium in Tokyo on 17 December 2008. The Ecuadorian side scored two goals in the first 26 minutes through Claudio Bieler and Luis Bolaños, securing their place in the Club World Cup final.

Manchester United's semi-final opponents were Gamba Osaka, who had previously defeated Australian A-League premiers and Asian Champions League runners-up Adelaide United (1–0) to move into the second semi-final on 18 December. Nemanja Vidić and Cristiano Ronaldo opened the scoring in the first half, building up a two-goal lead at half-time. Masato Yamazaki was the next to score in the 74th minute to bring Gamba back into contention, but Wayne Rooney scored twice and Darren Fletcher once within the next five minutes to extend United's lead. Yasuhito Endō converted an 85th-minute penalty kick and Hideo Hashimoto got a third for Gamba just minutes before the final whistle. The result was 5–3, taking Manchester United to the final.

== Match ==
=== Details ===
21 December 2008
19:30 UTC+9

LDU Quito (Ecuador)	0–1	(England) Manchester United
	Report	Rooney 73'

International Stadium Yokohama
Attendance: 68,682
Referee: Ravshan Irmatov (Uzbekistan)

LDU Quito	Manchester United

GK	1	(Ecuador) José Cevallos	(yellow card) 44'
CB	3	(Ecuador) Renán Calle	(yellow card) 66'	(substituted off) 77'
CB	14	(Ecuador) Diego Calderón
CB	2	(Argentina) Norberto Araujo
RM	23	(Ecuador) Jayro Campos	(yellow card) 36'
CM	15	(Ecuador) William Araujo	(yellow card) 71'
CM	8	(Ecuador) Patricio Urrutia (c)
LM	7	(Ecuador) Luis Bolaños		(substituted off) 87'
RF	13	(Ecuador) Néicer Reasco		(substituted off) 82'
CF	16	(Argentina) Claudio Bieler	(yellow card) 2'
LF	21	(Argentina) Damián Manso
Substitutions:
DF	4	(Ecuador) Paúl Ambrosi		(substituted on) 77'
MF	20	(Ecuador) Pedro Larrea		(substituted on) 82'
FW	19	(Chile) Reinaldo Navia		(substituted on) 87'
Manager:
(Argentina) Edgardo Bauza

GK	1	(Netherlands) Edwin van der Sar
RB	21	(Brazil) Rafael		(substituted off) 85'
CB	5	(England) Rio Ferdinand (c)
CB	15	(Serbia) Nemanja Vidić	(red card) 49'
LB	3	(France) Patrice Evra
CM	16	(England) Michael Carrick
CM	8	(Brazil) Anderson	(yellow card) 70'	(substituted off) 88'
RW	7	(Portugal) Cristiano Ronaldo
AM	13	(South Korea) Park Ji-sung
LW	32	(Argentina) Carlos Tevez		(substituted off) 51'
CF	10	(England) Wayne Rooney
Substitutions:
DF	23	(Northern Ireland) Jonny Evans		(substituted on) 51'
DF	2	(England) Gary Neville		(substituted on) 85'
MF	24	(Scotland) Darren Fletcher		(substituted on) 88'
Manager:
(Scotland) Alex Ferguson

Assistant referees:
Abdukhamidullo Rasulov (Uzbekistan)
Bahadyr Kochkorov (Kyrgyzstan)
Fourth official:
Yuichi Nishimura (Japan)

Match rules

- 90 minutes
- 30 minutes of extra time if necessary
- Penalty shoot-out if scores still level
- Twelve named substitutes
- Maximum of three substitutions

=== Statistics ===
First half
	LDU Quito	Manchester United
Goals scored	0	0
Total shots	4	11
Shots on target	0	5
Ball possession	36%	64%
Corner kicks	0	3
Fouls committed	14	10
Offsides	0	1
Yellow cards	3	0
Red cards	0	0

Second half
	LDU Quito	Manchester United
Goals scored	0	1
Total shots	6	5
Shots on target	3	4
Ball possession	54%	46%
Corner kicks	5	0
Fouls committed	12	7
Offsides	3	0
Yellow cards	2	1
Red cards	0	1

Overall
	LDU Quito	Manchester United
Goals scored	0	1
Total shots	10	16
Shots on target	3	9
Ball possession	45%	55%
Corner kicks	5	3
Fouls committed	26	17
Offsides	3	1
Yellow cards	5	1
Red cards	0	1

== See also ==
- Manchester United F.C. in European football
