= 2008 Copa Libertadores finals =

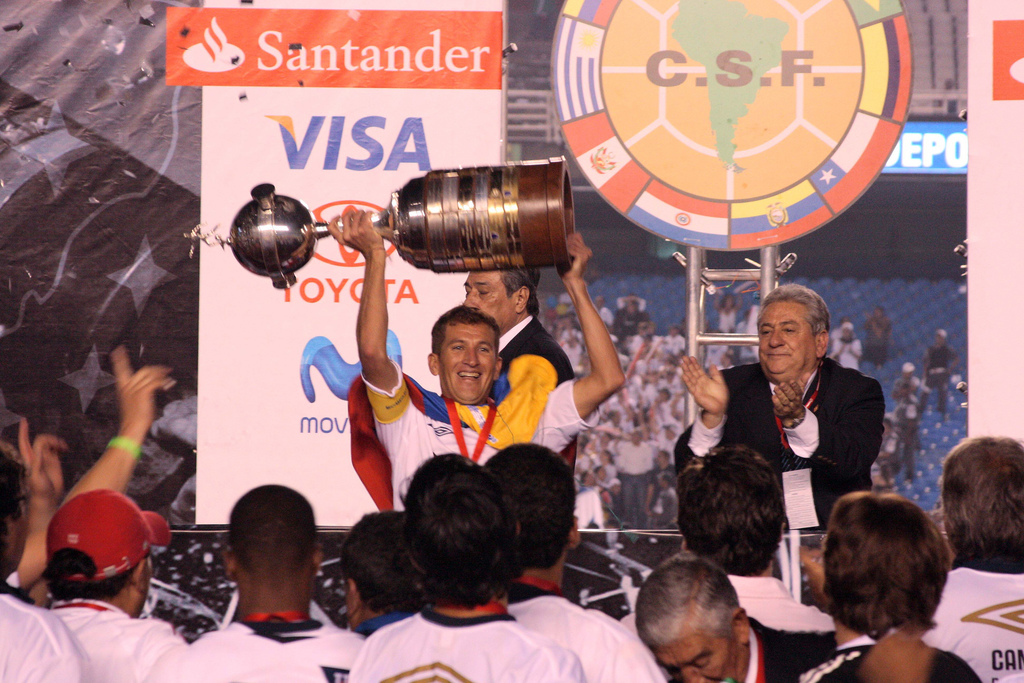
- LDU Quito, champions.
- Event: 2008 Copa Libertadores
LDU Quito	Fluminense
(Ecuador)	(Brazil)
5	5
- on aggregate LDU Quito won 3–1 on penalties

First leg
LDU Quito	Fluminense
4	2
- Date: 25 June 2008
- Venue: Estadio Casa Blanca, Quito
- Referee: Carlos Chandía
- Attendance: 26,262

Second leg
Fluminense	LDU Quito
3	1
- After extra time
- Date: 2 July 2008
- Venue: Estádio Mario Filho (Maracanã), Rio de Janeiro
- Man of the Match: José Francisco Cevallos
- Referee: Héctor Baldassi
- Attendance: 86,027

The 2008 Copa Libertadores finals was a two-legged football match-up to determine the 2008 Copa Libertadores champion. The series was contested between Liga Deportiva Universitaria de Quito from Quito, Ecuador, and Fluminense Football Club from Rio de Janeiro, Brazil, both of whom were playing in their first finals. The first leg was played at LDU Quito's home field, La Casa Blanca in Quito, Ecuador on 25 June 2008; the second leg was played at Fluminense's home field, Maracanã in Rio de Janeiro, Brazil on 2 July 2008. LDU Quito won the final on penalties 3–1, after each team won a game apiece, and equalized on goal difference after the end of extra-time of the second leg. With this achievement, LDU Quito became the first Ecuadorian club to win a Copa Libertadores title.

== Qualified teams ==
Team	Previous finals app.
(Ecuador) LDU Quito	None
(Brazil) Fluminense	None

== Venues ==
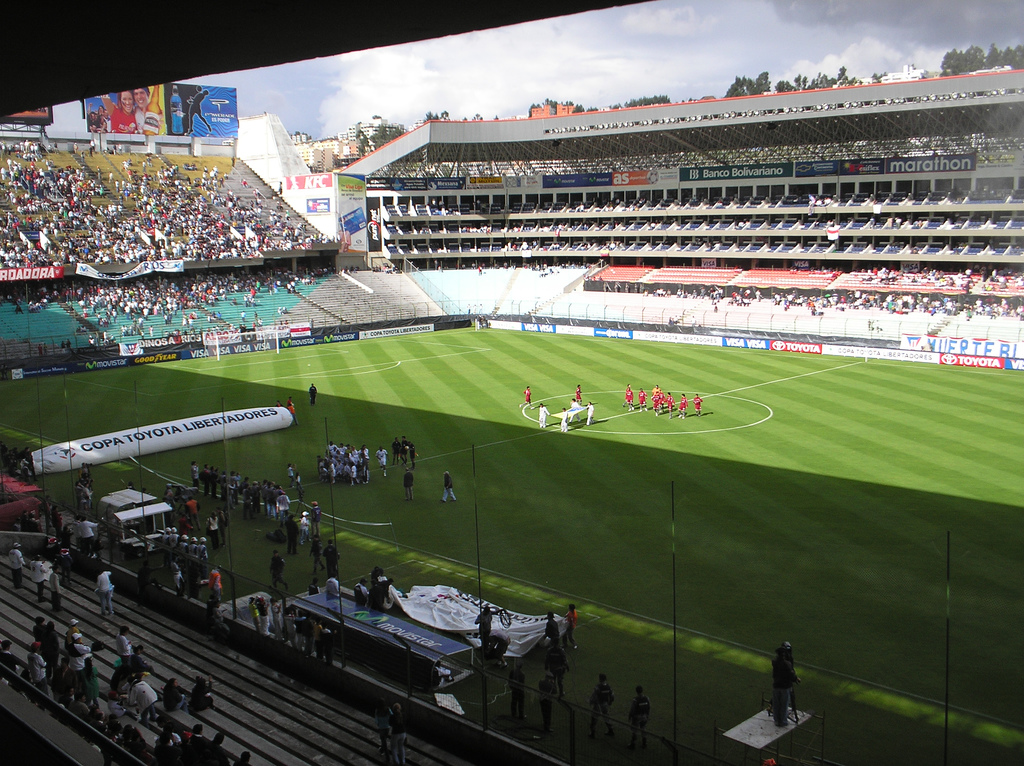
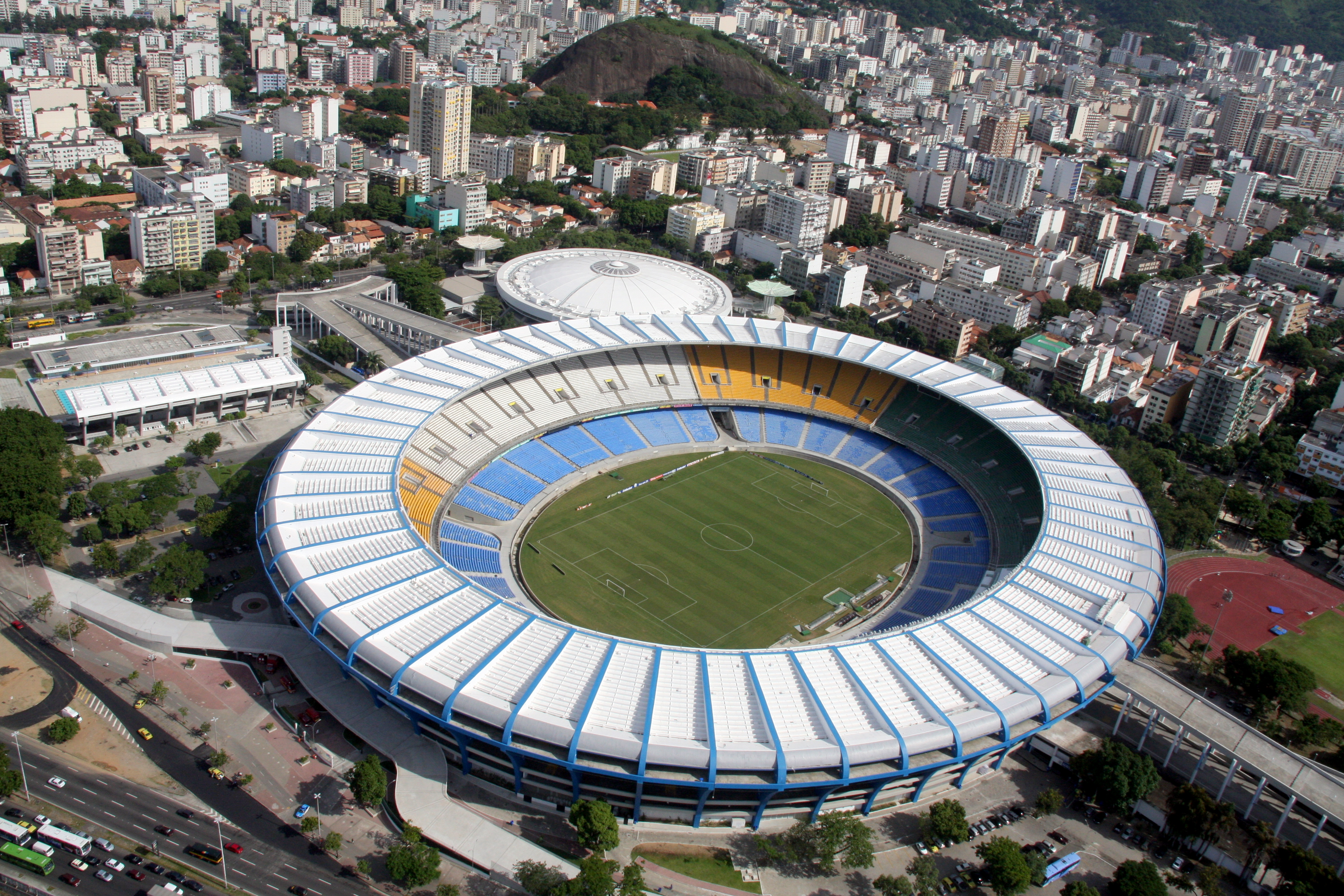
Estadio Casa Blanca (left) and Maracanã, venues for the series

== Finals rules ==
Like other match-ups in the knockout round, the teams will play two games, one at each team's home stadium. As the highest seeded team determined at the beginning of the knockout stage, Fluminense had home-field advantage for the second leg. Unlike other Copa Libertadores match-ups in the knockout round, the away goals rule is not used. If the teams remained tied after 90 minutes of play during the 2nd leg, extra time will be used, followed by a penalty shootout if necessary.

== Route to the finals ==
=== Group 8 of the Second Stage ===
Final Group 8 standings
Team	Pld	W	D	L	GF	GA	GD	Pts
(Brazil) Fluminense	6	4	1	1	11	3	+8	13
(Ecuador) LDU Quito	6	3	1	2	10	5	+5	10
(Argentina) Arsenal	6	3	0	3	6	14	−8	9
(Paraguay) Libertad	6	1	0	5	5	10	−5	3

Fluminense and LDU Quito both started in the Second Stage and were drawn into Group 8 along with Arsenal of Argentina and Libertad of Paraguay. Their first match was against each other in La Casa Blanca in Quito. The game ended in a goal-less draw.

LDU Quito then hosted Libertad on March 4. Patricio Urrutia and Joffre Guerrón scored for LDU Quito to give them a 2–0 win. They then visited Arsenal in Buenos Aires on March 12. Patricio Urrutia scored the loan goal of the game. The roles were reversed as LDU Quito hosted Arsenal on March 26. Liga walloped Arsenal 6–1 with goals by Patricio Urrutia, Damián Manso, Luis Bolaños (2), Claudio Bieler, and Alfonso Obregón; Luciano Leguizamón scored for Arsenal. On April 8, Liga travelled to Asuncion to play Libertad, where they lost 3–1. Alfonso Obregón scored the lone goal for Liga.

After the first game against Liga, Fluminense hosted Arsenal on March 5. The drubbing ended 6–0 in favor of Flu. Thiago Neves, Dodô (2), Gabriel, Washington, and Cícero provided the scores. Flu then travelled to Asuncion to face Libertad on March 19. Washington scored twice to give Flu a 2–1 win. Flu then played host for Libertad in a game that ended in a 2–0 win for Fluminense. Cícero and Thiago Silva provided the scores. Fluminense then travelled to Buenos Aires to play Arsenal on April 8. They were beat 2–0.

The last match of group play for LDU Quito and Fluminense was against each other on April 17. Cícero scored the only goal of the game to give Fluminense a 1–0 win. The win gave Fluminense the group. Fluminense and LDU Quito finished 1 & 2 with 13 and 10 points, respectively, and each advanced to the Round of 16 as the 1st and 11th seed.

=== Fluminense in the knockout stage ===
Fluminense was seeded 1 for the knockout stage, guaranteeing home field advantage for the second leg of any series. In the round of 16, they faced Atlético Nacional of Colombia, whom they defeated on aggregate 3-1 (2-1 & 1-0). In the quarter-finals, they faced fellow Brazilian side São Paulo. They won on aggregate 3-2 (0-1 & 3-1). In the semi-finals, they face defending Copa Libertadores champions Boca Juniors. After tying 2-2 on the first leg, they won 3-1 in the second leg to advance to their first Copa Libertadores finals.

=== LDU Quito in the knockout stage ===
LDU Quito was seeded 11 for the knockout stage. In the Round of 16, they faced Estudiantes, whom they beat on aggregate 3-2 (2-0 & 1-2) to advance. They faced another Argentine team, San Lorenzo in the quarter-finals. After tying 1-1 in both legs, the teams went into penalties, where LDU Quito triumphed 5-3. In the semi-finals, they faced Club América of Mexico. They tied both legs 1-1 in Mexico City and 0-0 in Quito. Since LDU Quito scored an away goal, they won the series and advanced to their first Copa Libertadores finals.

Fluminense			LDU Quito	
(Colombia) Atlético Nacional; A 2–1	Thiago Neves 22'; Conca 76'	Round of 16; First leg	(Argentina) Estudiantes; H 2–0	Guerrón 64'; Manso 78'
(Colombia) Atlético Nacional; H 1–0	Roger 52'	Second leg	(Argentina) Estudiantes; A 1–2	Bolaños 26'
(Brazil) São Paulo; A 0–1		Quarterfinals; First leg	(Argentina) San Lorenzo; A 1–1	Bieler 35'
(Brazil) São Paulo; H 3–1	Washington 11', 90+1'; Dodô 71'	Second leg	(Argentina) San Lorenzo; H 1–1 (p. 5–3)	Manso 26'
(Argentina) Boca Juniors; A 2–2	Thiago Silva 16'; Thiago Neves 76'	Semifinals; First leg	(Mexico) América; A 1–1	Bolaños 62'
(Argentina) Boca Juniors; H 3–1	Washington 63'; Ibarra 71' (o.g.); Dodô 90+3'	Second leg	(Mexico) América; H 0–0	

== Match details ==
=== First leg ===
The first leg was played at Estadio Casa Blanca in Quito. Claudio Bieler of LDU scored first in the 2nd minute, but Fluminense answered back with a goal by Darío Conca in the 12th minute. LDU scored three unanswered goals by the end of the half with goals by Joffre Guerrón (29'), Jairo Campos (34'), and Patricio Urrutia (45'). Thiago Neves scored again for Fluminense with the only goal of the second half at the 52nd minute. The final score left LDU Quito with a 2-goal advantage going into the next leg.

2008 Copa Libertadores finals
25 June 2008
19:50 (UTC-5)
First leg

LDU Quito (Ecuador)	4–2	(Brazil) Fluminense
Bieler 2'; Guerrón 29'; Campos 34'; Urrutia 45'		Conca 12'; Thiago Neves 52'

Estadio Casa Blanca, Quito
Attendance: 26,262
Referee: Carlos Chandía (Chile)

LDU Quito	Fluminense

GK	1	(Ecuador) José Francisco Cevallos
DF	3	(Ecuador) Renán Calle
DF	2	(Argentina) Norberto Araujo	(yellow card) 61'
DF	23	(Ecuador) Jairo Campos
DF	4	(Ecuador) Paúl Ambrosi
MF	20	(Paraguay) Enrique Vera	(yellow card) 22'
MF	8	(Ecuador) Patricio Urrutia (c)	(yellow card) 88'
MF	7	(Ecuador) Luis Bolaños
MF	21	(Argentina) Damián Manso		(substituted off) 74'
FW	19	(Ecuador) Joffre Guerrón
FW	16	(Argentina) Claudio Bieler	(yellow card) 41'	(substituted off) 82'
Substitutes:
GK	25	(Ecuador) Daniel Viteri
FW	9	(Ecuador) Agustín Delgado		(substituted on) 82'
MF	5	(Ecuador) Alfonso Obregón
MF	14	(Ecuador) Diego Calderón
FW	11	(Ecuador) Franklin Salas
MF	15	(Ecuador) William Araujo		(substituted on) 74'
MF	22	(Ecuador) Edder Vaca
Manager:
(Argentina) Edgardo Bauza

GK	1	(Brazil) Fernando Henrique
RB	2	(Brazil) Gabriel
CB	3	(Brazil) Thiago Silva
CB	4	(Brazil) Luiz Alberto (c)	(yellow card) 28'
LB	6	(Brazil) Júnior César
DM	5	(Brazil) Ygor	(yellow card) 43'
DM	8	(Brazil) Arouca		(substituted off) 67'
CM	17	(Brazil) Cícero
AM	10	(Brazil) Thiago Neves		(substituted off) 90'
AM	18	(Argentina) Darío Conca
CF	9	(Brazil) Washington	(yellow card) 68'	(substituted off) 72'
Substitutes:
GK	12	(Brazil) Diego
DF	13	(Brazil) Roger Machado		(substituted on) 90'
FW	11	(Brazil) Dodô		(substituted on) 72'
MF	14	(Brazil) Fabinho
MF	15	(Brazil) Maurício		(substituted on) 67'
FW	23	(Brazil) Alan
FW	24	(Brazil) Tartá
Manager:
(Brazil) Renato Gaúcho

Assistant referees:
(Chile) Cristian Julio
(Chile) Lorenzo Acuña
Fourth official:
(Chile) Enrique Osses

=== Second leg ===
The Second Leg was played in front of a capacity crowd at the legendary Maracanã in a game that would crown the South American champions. Luis Bolaños of LDU Quito scored first in the 6th minute to put LDU Quito up 1–0 in the game, and a three-goal advantage. Fluminense answered back with a hat-trick by Thiago Neves who scored goals in the 12th, 28th, and 56th minute. The score at the end of regulation was 3–1, leaving both teams equal on goal difference; extra-time was needed. After a scoreless extra-time, the game went on to a penalty shootout. LDU Quito goalkeeper José Francisco Cevallos blocked three of four penalty kicks, while his teammates put in three of four to give LDU Quito their first Copa Libertadores title.

2 July 2008
21:50 (UTC-3)
Second leg

Fluminense (Brazil)	3–1 (a.e.t.)	(Ecuador) LDU Quito
Thiago Neves 12', 28', 56'		Bolaños 6'
Penalties
Conca (penalty missed); Thiago Neves (penalty missed); Cícero (penalty scored); Washington (penalty missed)	1–3	(penalty scored) Urrutia; (penalty missed) Campos; (penalty scored) Salas; (penalty scored) Guerrón

Estádio do Maracanã, Rio de Janeiro
Attendance: 86,027
Referee: Héctor Baldassi (Argentina)

Fluminense	LDU Quito

GK	1	(Brazil) Fernando Henrique
RB	2	(Brazil) Gabriel		(substituted off) 105'
CB	3	(Brazil) Thiago Silva	(yellow card) 106'
CB	4	(Brazil) Luiz Alberto (c)	(yellow card) 65' (yellow-red card) 120'
LB	6	(Brazil) Júnior César
DM	5	(Brazil) Ygor		(substituted off) 46'
DM	8	(Brazil) Arouca		(substituted off) 110'
CM	17	(Brazil) Cícero	(yellow card) 87'
AM	10	(Brazil) Thiago Neves
AM	18	(Argentina) Darío Conca
CF	9	(Brazil) Washington
Substitutes:
GK	22	(Brazil) Ricardo Berna
FW	7	(Brazil) Somália
FW	11	(Brazil) Dodô		(substituted on) 46'
DF	13	(Brazil) Roger Machado		(substituted on) 110'
MF	14	(Brazil) Fabinho
MF	15	(Brazil) Maurício		(substituted on) 105'
FW	24	(Brazil) Tartá
Manager:
(Brazil) Renato Gaúcho

GK	1	(Ecuador) José Francisco Cevallos	(yellow card) 118'
RB	23	(Ecuador) Jairo Campos
CB	3	(Ecuador) Renán Calle
CB	2	(Argentina) Norberto Araujo
LB	4	(Ecuador) Paúl Ambrosi
CM	20	(Paraguay) Enrique Vera	(yellow card) 62'
CM	8	(Ecuador) Patricio Urrutia (c)
RW	19	(Ecuador) Joffre Guerrón	(yellow card) 120'
AM	21	(Argentina) Damián Manso		(substituted off) 88'
LW	7	(Ecuador) Luis Bolaños		(substituted off) 105'
CF	16	(Argentina) Claudio Bieler	(yellow card) 31'
Substitutes:
GK	25	(Ecuador) Daniel Viteri
MF	14	(Ecuador) Diego Calderón
MF	5	(Ecuador) Alfonso Obregón
FW	9	(Ecuador) Agustín Delgado
DF	18	(Ecuador) Byron Camacho
MF	15	(Ecuador) William Araujo		(substituted on) 88'
FW	11	(Ecuador) Franklin Salas		(substituted on) 105'
Manager:
(Argentina) Edgardo Bauza

Man of the Match:
(Ecuador) José Francisco Cevallos

Assistant referees:
(Argentina) Ricardo Casas
(Argentina) Hernán Maidana
Fourth official:
(Argentina) Saúl Laverni

== Aftermath ==
Prior to the matches, Fluminense was favored to win since they had eliminated the defending champion (Boca Juniors) in the semifinals, and defeated LDU Quito in an earlier encounter at Maracanã. Following the surprise loss in Quito, pressure was on Fluminense to win at home. When LDU Quito sealed the deal at Maracanã, the media dubbed the match a "Maracanazo", a slang term in Latin American football given to a game at Maracanã where the underdog team upsets the hosts. As the hosts were expected to win, that the celebratory confetti for the award presentation was in Fluminense's color.

LDU Quito had won their first Copa Libertadores title, becoming the first Ecuadorian team to do so. The title is also the first international title ever won by a team from Ecuador. LDU Quito captain Patricio Urrutia was named player of the finals, and Joffre Guerrón was named player of the tournament. By winning the tournament, LDU Quito won the right to represent South American in the 2008 FIFA Club World Cup, for which they qualify directly to the semi-finals. LDU Quito winning the Copa Libertadores was called historic by major newspapers that followed the competition, and won praise throughout the continent.

Throughout the tournament, the team and its player gained wide support from across Ecuador, not just by their typical fan-base in Quito. Following the win, they were publicly applauded by every sector of Ecuadorian society and government, and were treated as heroes upon their return to the country.

Currently, this year's finals hold or shares two Copa Libertadores finals records: most goals in a single game (6) for Game 1; most goals in two legs (10).
