= Pedro Romo =

Pedro Romo may refer to:

- Pedro Romo (actor) (born 1957), Mexican actor and comedian
- Pedro Romo (footballer) (born 1989), Ecuadorian footballer
