= Efren de la Cruz (footballer) =

Ecuadorian footballer (born 1989)

Personal information
- Full name: Efren Alberto de la Cruz Mieles
- Date of birth: March 23, 1989 (age 37)
- Place of birth: Portoviejo, Ecuador
- Position: Midfielder

Youth career
- 2003: El Nacional
- 2006–: LDU Quito

Senior career*
Years	Team	Apps	(Gls)
2008–2009	LDU Quito	2	(0)
2010	Deportivo Quito	0	(0)
2011	Águilas	10	(0)
2012	El Guayacán	6	(2)
2013–2014	Napoli	13	(0)
- * Club domestic league appearances and goals as of April 27, 2014

Efren Alberto de la Cruz Mieles (born March 25, 1989, in Portoviejo) is an Ecuadorian footballer.
