= Gum (footballer) =

Brazilian footballer (born 1986)

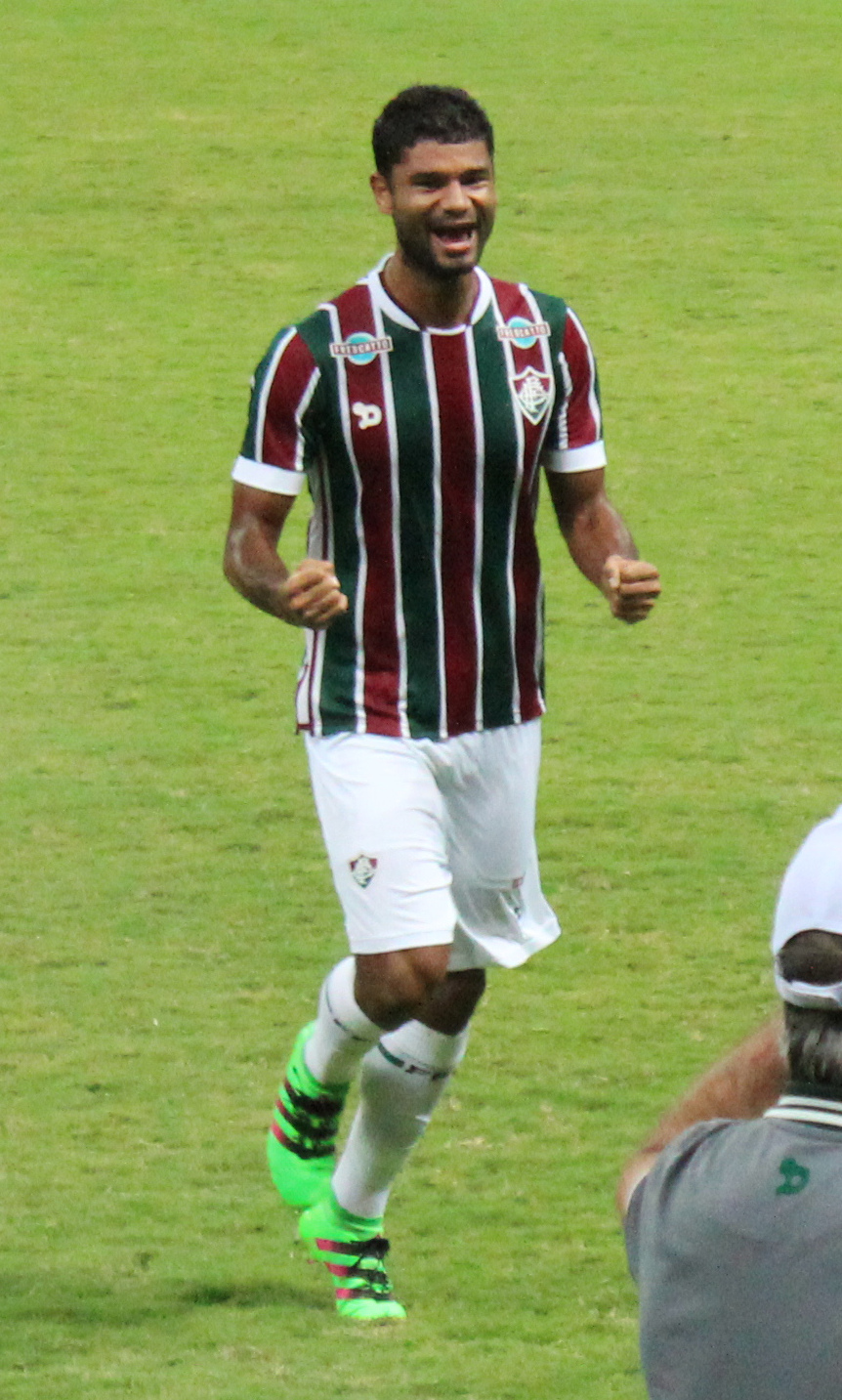
- Gum with Fluminense in 2016

Personal information
- Full name: Welington Pereira Rodrigues
- Date of birth: 4 January 1986 (age 40)
- Place of birth: São Paulo, Brazil
- Height: 1.89 m (6 ft 2 1/2 in)
- Position: Centre back

Youth career
- 2002–2003: Marília

Senior career*
Years	Team	Apps	(Gls)
2004–2008	Marília	60	(7)
2004	→ Osvaldo Cruz (loan)		
2006–2007	→ Internacional (loan)	4	(0)
2008–2009	Ponte Preta	63	(10)
2009–2018	Fluminense	407	(28)
2019	Chapecoense	27	(1)
2020–2023	CRB	158	(7)
- * Club domestic league appearances and goals as of 26 December 2020

Welington Pereira Rodrigues (born 4 January 1986), commonly known as Gum, is a Brazilian footballer who plays as a central defender.

He spent nine years with Fluminense, making 414 total appearances and scoring 28 goals, while winning the Campeonato Brasileiro Série A in 2010 and 2012.

== Club career ==
=== Marília ===
Born in São Paulo, Gum was a Marília youth graduate. He made his first team debut in 2005, with the side in Série B, and also had an unassuming loan spell at Osvaldo Cruz back in 2004.

On 13 September 2006 Gum was loaned to Série A club Internacional, until July. The following March, after making no league appearances, he rescinded his contract and returned to MAC.

=== Ponte Preta ===
On 26 June 2008 Gum signed a five-year deal with fellow second-tier club Ponte Preta, who acquired 50% of his federative rights. He was an immediate starter for the club after his arrival, impressing in the following year's Campeonato Paulista.

=== Fluminense ===
On 17 August 2009 Gum joined Fluminense in the top flight. He made his debut in the league thirteen days later, in a 2–0 away defeat to Santos.

Gum scored his first goals in the top flight of Brazilian football on 18 October 2009, netting a brace in a 2–2 home draw against Internacional. He finished the campaign with 16 appearances and three goals, as his side narrowly avoided relegation.

Gum was also an important unit during the club's 2009 Copa Sudamericana run, scoring a goal against Cerro Porteño which secured qualification to the final; he also scored the final goal in a 3–0 home win against LDU Quito in the second leg, as his side finished runners up (5-4 on aggregate).

Gum was a first-choice during Flu's 2010 Brasileirão winning campaign, partnering Leandro Euzébio to form the best defence in the league. He was also an undisputed starter in 2012, winning another title.

In January 2015 Gum signed a new four-year deal with Fluminense. In his last game of the season, he scored the first in a 3–1 home win against Avaí; it was also his 300th appearance for the club.

On 16 September 2018, as his contract entered its final stages, Gum made his 400th appearance for Fluminense in their 3–1 national league defeat away to Athletico Paranaense. In doing so, he entered their top ten appearance-makers of all time, eventually finishing in eighth with 414.

=== Later career ===
In March 2019, Gum moved to Chapecoense on a one-year deal with the option of a second. He played 20 times in his one national campaign for the team from Santa Catarina, scoring in a 2–1 loss away to Flamengo – main rivals of his former employer – on 12 May.

Gum transferred again on 12 February 2020, joining CRB of the Campeonato Alagoano. He played five games in his first state season as they won the title, including a 1–0 final win over rivals CSA in the final on 5 August.

== Career statistics ==
As of 29 November 2019

Club	Season	League			State League		Cup		Continental		Other		Total	
Club	Season	Division	Apps	Goals	Apps	Goals	Apps	Goals	Apps	Goals	Apps	Goals	Apps	Goals
Marília	2005	Série B	2	0	0	0	0	0	—		—		2	0
Marília	2006	Série B	15	3	17	2	0	0	—		—		32	5
Marília	2007	Série B	14	2	4	1	0	0	—		—		18	3
Marília	2008	Série B	0	0	14	1	0	0	—		—		14	1
Marília	Subtotal		31	5	35	4	0	0	—		—		66	9
Internacional	2006	Série A	0	0	—		—		—		—		0	0
Internacional	2007	Série A	0	0	4	0	0	0	—		—		4	0
Internacional	Subtotal		0	0	4	0	0	0	—		—		4	0
Ponte Preta	2008	Série B	16	3	—		0	0	—		—		16	3
Ponte Preta	2009	Série B	15	2	19	4	0	0	—		—		34	6
Ponte Preta	Subtotal		31	5	19	4	0	0	—		—		50	9
Fluminense	2009	Série A	16	3	—		—		7 (Note: All appearance(s) in Copa Sudamericana)	2	—		23	5
Fluminense	2010	Série A	34	4	13	0	5	1	—		—		52	5
Fluminense	2011	Série A	24	0	16	0	—		8 (Note: All appearance(s) in Copa Libertadores)	1	—		48	1
Fluminense	2012	Série A	34	2	6	0	—		5	0	—		45	2
Fluminense	2013	Série A	34	4	9	0	2	0	5	0	—		50	4
Fluminense	2014	Série A	15	0	16	1	4	1	—		—		35	2
Fluminense	2015	Série A	29	1	9	0	6	1	—		—		44	2
Fluminense	2016	Série A	34	2	8	1	6	0	—		4 (Note: All appearance(s) in Primeira Liga)	0	52	3
Fluminense	2017	Série A	5	0	0	0	0	0	—		0	0	5	0
Fluminense	2018	Série A	28	1	12	1	3	0	10	2	—		53	4
Fluminense	Subtotal		253	17	89	3	26	3	35	5	4	0	405	28
Chapecoense	2019	Série A	20	1	4	0	3	0	0	0	—		27	1
Career total			335	28	151	11	29	3	35	5	4	0	550	47

== Honours ==
Fluminense

- Campeonato Brasileiro: 2010, 2012
- Taça Guanabara: 2012
- Campeonato Carioca: 2012
- Primeira Liga: 2016

CRB

- Campeonato Alagoano: 2020

=== Individual ===
- Campeonato Carioca Team of the year: 2018
