= Marco Quiñónez =

Ecuadorian footballer (born 1977)

Personal information
- Full name: Marco Quiñónez
- Date of birth: September 28, 1977 (age 49)
- Place of birth: Guayaquil, Ecuador
- Position: Defender

Team information
- Current team: Deportivo Cuenca
- Number: 5

Senior career*
Years	Team	Apps	(Gls)
1994–2001	Panamá SC		
2002	Audaz Octubrino		
2003	Universidad Católica		
2003–2004	Panamá SC		
2005–2007	Emelec	63	(0)
2008	Aucas Quito	13	(0)
2008	Deportivo Quito	3	(0)
2009–	Deportivo Cuenca	30	(1)

International career^{‡}
2007–	Ecuador	1	(0)
- * Club domestic league appearances and goals as of 15 December 2009 ‡ National team caps and goals as of 15 December 2009

Marco Quiñónez (born September 28, 1977) is a football defender. He currently plays for Barcelona Sporting Club.
