= Ygor (footballer, born 1984) =

Brazilian footballer

Personal information
- Full name: Ygor Maciel Santiago
- Date of birth: 1 June 1984 (age 42)
- Place of birth: Santana do Livramento, Brazil
- Height: 1.79 m (5 ft 10 in)
- Position: Defensive midfielder

Senior career*
Years	Team	Apps	(Gls)
2003–2007	Vasco da Gama	182	(11)
2007–2010	Start	26	(1)
2008–2009	→ Fluminense (loan)	26	(0)
2009	→ Portuguesa (loan)	26	(1)
2010–2012	Figueirense	68	(5)
2012–2015	Internacional	46	(1)
2015	→ Goiás (loan)	10	(0)
2016	Náutico	6	(0)
2016–2017	Al-Salmiya	?	(1)
2018	AA Portuguesa	4	(0)
- * Club domestic league appearances and goals

Ygor Maciel Santiago (born 1 June 1984), commonly known as Ygor, is a Brazilian former professional footballer who played as a defensive midfielder.

== Career ==
Born in Santana do Livramento, Ygor started his career with Vasco da Gama. In February 2007, he was transferred to Start of Norway for about €1 million. He signed a four-year contract with the club and made his league debut on 9 April 2007 against Aalesund. He scored his first goal for the club six days later in a 1–1 draw against Viking, which was the opening game of Start's new stadium Sør Arena. (Note: Ygor at the Norwegian Football Federation (in Norwegian)) Ygor featured in all of Start's league games in the 2007 season. Following the club's relegation from the Norwegian Premier League in 2007, he was loaned out to Fluminense for the 2008 season in Brazil. After a year in Fluminense, he went on loan to Portuguesa, and stayed at Lusa for one year. His contract with Start was terminated in March 2010. After this, Ygor signed with Figueirense.

== Honours ==
Internacional (Note: Ygor at Soccerway (archived))

- Campeonato Gaúcho: 2013, 2014

Goiás

- Campeonato Goiano: 2015
