= Henry León =

Ecuadorian footballer (born 1983)

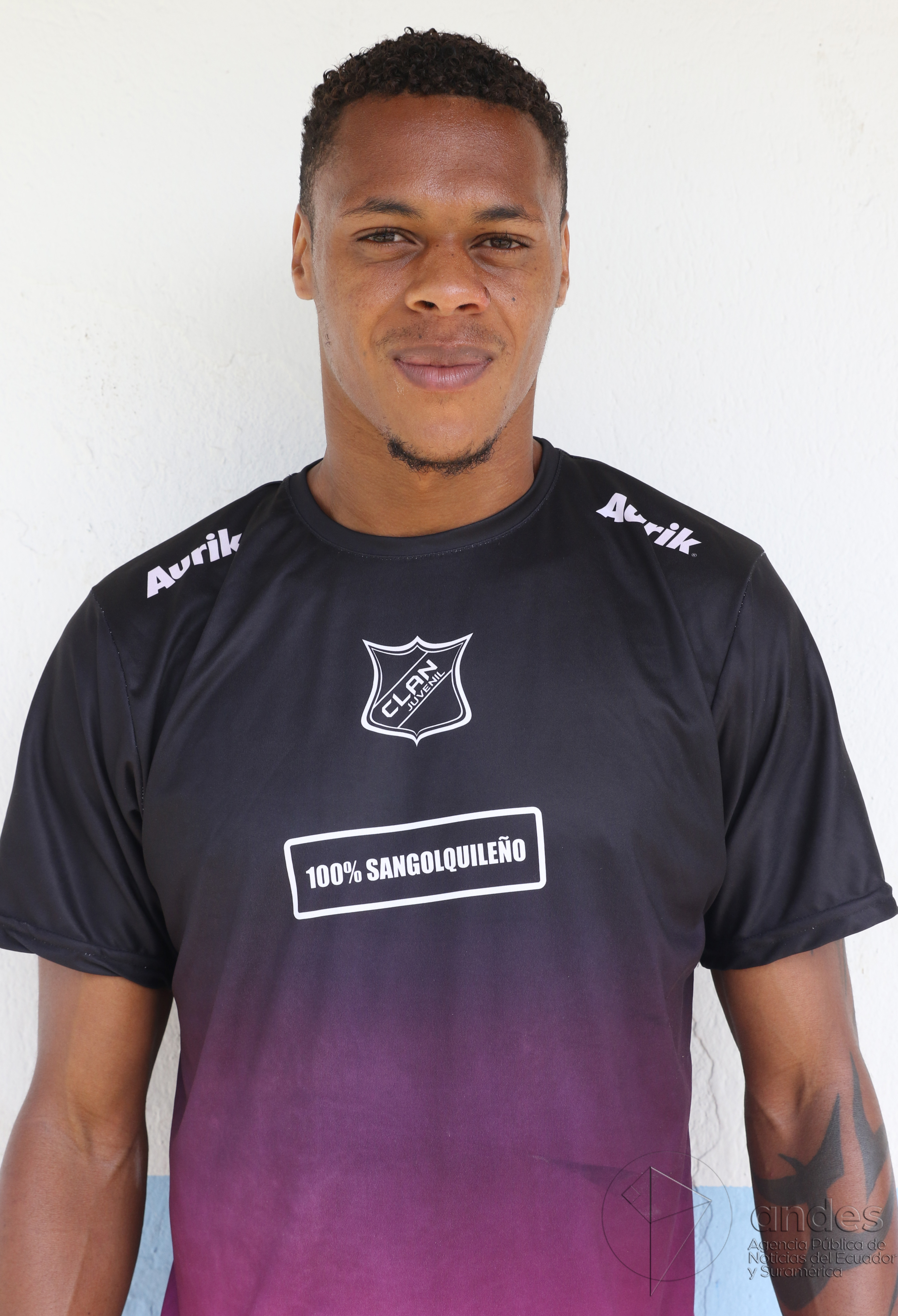

Personal information
- Full name: Henry Geovanny León León
- Date of birth: April 20, 1983 (age 43)
- Place of birth: Quito, Ecuador
- Height: 1.85 m (6 ft 1 in)
- Position: Central midfielder

Team information
- Current team: Técnico Universitario
- Number: 21

Youth career
- 1994–2001: El Nacional
- 2001–2002: ESPOLI

Senior career*
Years	Team	Apps	(Gls)
2003–2008	ESPOLI	99	(13)
2009	Universidad Católica	7	(2)
2009	El Gounah		
2010	Barcelona	16	(1)
2011	Olmedo	37	(3)
2012–2014	Independiente DV	115	(6)
2015–2016	Emelec	0	(0)
2017	Clan Juvenil	32	(0)
2018	Aucas	20	(0)
2019–	Técnico Universitario	6	(0)

International career
2011–	Ecuador	1	(0)
- * Club domestic league appearances and goals as of 14 April 2019

Henry Geovanny León León (born April 20, 1983) is an Ecuadorian football player who plays for Serie A club Técnico Universitario. He formerly played for Universidad Católica, Barcelona, ESPOLI.
