= Danny Vera (footballer) =

Ecuadorian footballer (born 1980)

Personal information
- Full name: Danny Alejandro Vera Carpio
- Date of birth: August 8, 1980 (age 46)
- Place of birth: Guayaquil, Ecuador
- Height: 1.79 m (5 ft 10 in)
- Position: Forward

Youth career
- 1994–2001: Barcelona

Senior career*
Years	Team	Apps	(Gls)
1999–2008	Barcelona	114	(24)
2002	→Macará (loan)	25	(5)
2003	→ESPOLI (loan)	31	(11)
2006	→El Nacional (loan)	28	(13)
2009	LDU Quito	24	(5)
2010	Olmedo	22	(5)
2011	Manta	13	(1)
2014	Patria	12	(6)

International career
2007	Ecuador	2	(0)
- * Club domestic league appearances and goals as of July 9, 2014

Danny Alejandro Vera Carpio (born August 8, 1980) is a retired Ecuadorian footballer.

== Titles ==
=== Club ===
- El Nacional
  - Serie A de Ecuador: 2006
