= Pedro Romo (footballer) =

Ecuadorian footballer (born 1989)

Personal information
- Full name: Pedro Alejandro Romo Dávalos
- Date of birth: May 6, 1989 (age 37)
- Place of birth: Quito, Ecuador
- Position: Defensive midfielder

Team information
- Current team: Gualaceo SC

Youth career
- 2003−2010: LDU Quito

Senior career*
Years	Team	Apps	(Gls)
2008−2012	LDU Quito	13	(0)
2011−2012	→ Aucas (loan)	65	(2)
2013	Pilahuin Tío	20	(2)
2014	F.C. UIDE	19	(5)
2015	Espoli	37	(7)
2016	Delfín	4	(0)
2016	Manta FC	18	(0)
2017−	Gualaceo S.C.	24	(1)
- * Club domestic league appearances and goals as of August 13, 2017

Pedro Alejandro Romo Dávalos (born May 6, 1989) is an Ecuadorian football midfielder who plays for Gualaceo SC.

== Club career ==
A product of LDU Quito's youth system, he began making senior club appearances for Liga in 2008, and was included in the squad roster for the 2009 Recopa Sudamericana and the 2009 Copa Sudamericana.

== Honors ==
LDU Quito

- Serie A: 2010
