= Edder Vaca =

Ecuadorian footballer (born 1985)

Personal information
- Full name: Edder Javier Vaca Quinde
- Date of birth: 25 December 1985 (age 40)
- Place of birth: Guayaquil, Ecuador
- Height: 1.66 m (5 ft 5 in)
- Position: Attacking midfielder

Team information
- Current team: América S.C.
- Number: 10

Youth career
- 2004: Barcelona
- 2005: El Nacional

Senior career*
Years	Team	Apps	(Gls)
2000–2004	Rocafuerte	61	(34)
2004	→ Barcelona (loan)	2	(0)
2005	Emelec	3	(0)
2006	Deportivo Azogues	36	(19)
2007	Deportivo Quito	42	(8)
2008–2009	LDU Quito	26	(8)
2010	Independiente José Terán	19	(7)
2010	LDU Portoviejo	12	(4)
2011	LDU Loja	35	(12)
2012	Deportivo Quito	13	(1)
2013	LDU Loja	17	(3)
2013	Olmedo	13	(1)
2014	Mushuc Runa	1	(0)
2014	LDU Loja	7	(0)
2015	ESPOLI	26	(6)
2016	Estudiantes del Guayas	6	(4)
2016	Técnico Universitario	6	(0)
2017–2018	América S.C.	13	(11)

International career^{‡}
2007	Ecuador	2	(0)
- * Club domestic league appearances and goals as of December 10, 2014 ‡ National team caps and goals as of 28 September 2008

Edder Javier Vaca Quinde (born 25 December 1985) is an Ecuadorian former footballer.

== Club career ==
Edder Vaca started out with the 3rd-level club Rocafuerte Fútbol Club out of Guayaquil. He played on their senior team until 2004, when he was loaned to Barcelona Sporting Club to play on their senior and sub-20 teams. In 2005, he was loaned out to Club Sport Emelec for a couple of senior level matches, but mainly played on Club Deportivo El Nacional's sub-20 teams. 2006, he was part of the Deportivo Azogues squad that was promoted mid-season from Serie B to top-level Serie A. In 2007, he played with Deportivo Quito where he had a tremendous season with his club as he was scoring goals and making assists. He caught the eye of several Ecuadorian teams such as LDU Quito. During the winter transfer window, he was awarded a move to LDU Quito.

While playing for Liga, he mostly played games for the domestic league instead of the games for Copa Libertadores. He scored 6 goals in 13 games for Liga. He was mostly used as a substitute for the Copa Libertadores. He scored one of Liga's penalties in quarter final game against San Lorenzo. His team won the tournament by penalties against Fluminense.

== National team ==
Vaca has been called up for the Ecuador national team. He scored his first goal with them in a 2007 friendly win over Sweden. He came on as a substitute against El Salvador in which Ecuador won 5–1. Although he has only two caps, he is seen as a promising player for his country.

== Honors ==
Deportivo Azogues

- Serie B: 2006 E1

LDU Quito

- Copa Libertadores: 2008
