= Claudio Graf =

Argentine footballer

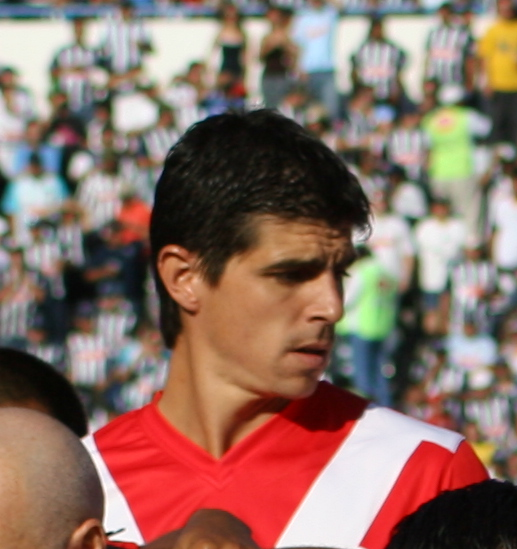
- 2008

Personal information
- Full name: Claudio Fernando Graf
- Date of birth: 31 January 1976 (age 50)
- Place of birth: Bahía Blanca, Argentina
- Height: 1.76 m (5 ft 9 in)
- Position: Forward

Senior career*
Years	Team	Apps	(Gls)
1994–1995	Liniers	16	(7)
1995–1996	Banfield	17	(3)
1996	Racing Club	2	(0)
1997	Quilmes	15	(0)
1997–1999	Independiente	60	(13)
2000–2002	Colón	67	(29)
2002–2003	Litex Lovech	19	(4)
2003–2004	Chacarita Juniors	32	(10)
2004–2007	Lanús	75	(32)
2007–2008	Sakaryaspor	10	(1)
2008	Veracruz	15	(9)
2009	UAG	11	(5)
2009	LDU Quito	17	(6)
2010	Colo Colo	8	(2)
2010–2011	Gimnasia LP	24	(4)
2011–2012	San Martín SJ	20	(0)

Managerial career
- 2014–2015: Lanús (youth)
- 2016–2018: Talleres (youth)
- 2018–2019: San Martín Tucumán (assistant)
- 2019: Unión La Calera (assistant)
- 2020–2021: Alvarado (assistant)
- 2022: Independiente (reserves)
- 2022: Independiente (interim)
- * Club domestic league appearances and goals

Claudio Fernando Graf (born 31 January 1976) is an Argentine football coach and former player who played as a forward.

== Career ==
Born in a family of Volga German origin, in the city of Bahía Blanca, Graf has played for a number of clubs in Argentina including Liniers de Bahía Blanca, Banfield, Racing Club, Quilmes, Independiente, Colón de Santa Fe, Chacarita Juniors, and Litex Lovech in Bulgaria.

During the Apertura 2004 he scored a goal with his butt for Chacarita Juniors against Club Atlético Independiente. Chacarita Juniors won 3-0 that day. With Lanús he scored a hat-trick against Rosario Central. After that game the club's fans started calling him San Graf (in English: "St. Graf").

In late 2009, he joined Ecuadorian club LDU Quito. He was part of the squad that won the 2009 Copa Sudamericana. In January 2010, he joined Chilean champion Colo Colo, where he played the 2010 Copa Libertadores. He played with San Martín de San Juan until released in July 2012.

== Managerial career ==
Retiring in 2012, Graf began his coaching career in April 2014, where he was hired as a youth coach in Lanús. In 2016, he joined Talleres in a similar youth coach position.

On 27 September 2018, Graf was appointed assistant coach of Walter Coyette at San Martín de Tucumán. They left the club in February 2019. In September 2019, Graf was once again appointed assistant coach Coyette, this time at Chilean club Unión La Calera. They only lasted until the end of 2019.

In June 2020, Graf followed Walter Coyette to Alvarado, once again as an assistant coach.

== Honors ==
- LDU Quito
  - Copa Sudamericana: 2009
  - Recopa Sudamericana: 2009
