= Diego Calderón =

Ecuadorian footballer (born 1986)

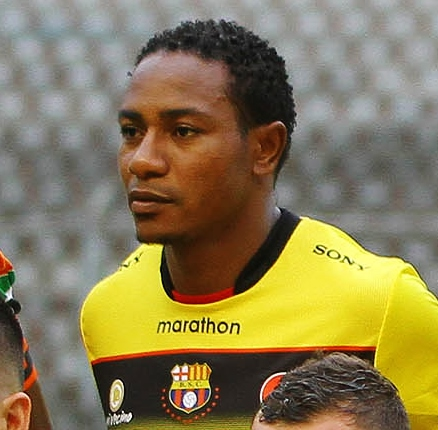
- Calderón with Barcelona SC in 2015

Personal information
- Full name: Diego Armando Calderón Espinoza
- Date of birth: October 26, 1986 (age 40)
- Place of birth: Quito, Ecuador
- Height: 1.80 m (5 ft 11 in)
- Positions: Left-back; centre-back

Youth career
- 2003–2005: LDU Quito

Senior career*
Years	Team	Apps	(Gls)
2005–2012	LDU Quito	210	(4)
2006	→ Deportivo Azogues (loan)	11	(0)
2013	Colorado Rapids	4	(0)
2014	LDU Quito	12	(0)
2015	Barcelona SC	13	(0)
2016	Zacatepec	29	(2)
2017	Deportivo Cuenca	3	(0)
2017	Aucas	22	(2)
2018–2019	Alianza Cotopaxi	32	(1)
2019	Club Unibolivar	5	(0)

International career
2011–2012	Ecuador	5	(0)
- * Club domestic league appearances and goals as of 24 November 2019

Diego Armando Calderón Espinoza (born October 26, 1986) is an Ecuadorian footballer. He was part of the squad who won the 2008 Copa Libertadores with Liga de Quito.

== Club career ==
Calderón participated in L.D.U. Quito's campaign in the Copa Libertadores 2008. He made great defensive displays against many of Liga's opponents. However, he sustained an injury during the Round of 16 and was replaced by Renán Calle for the rest of the tournament. His team became the first Ecuadorian team to win the Copa Libertadores.

Calderón again became a regular starter during Liga's campaign in the 2008 FIFA Club World Cup. He played both games against Pachuca and Manchester United. Although Liga was able to defeat Pachuca 2–0 in the semifinals, they lost the final to Manchester United, 1–0. He and the rest of his team had a good, solid performance throughout the tournament. He was loaned to the Colorado Rapids in advance of the 2013 season, although he missed much of the season following knee surgery.

== Honours ==
L.D.U. Quito

- Serie A (3): 2005 Apertura, 2007, 2010
- Copa Libertadores (1): 2008
- Copa Sudamericana (1): 2009
- Recopa Sudamericana (2): 2009, 2010

Deportivo Azogues

- Serie B (1): 2006 E1
