= Damián Manso =

Argentine footballer

Personal information
- Full name: Damián Alejandro Manso
- Date of birth: 6 June 1979 (age 47)
- Place of birth: Rosario, Argentina
- Height: 1.69 m (5 ft 7 in)
- Position: Attacking midfielder

Youth career
- 1992–1996: Newell's Old Boys

Senior career*
Years	Team	Apps	(Gls)
1997–2005	Newell's Old Boys	188	(15)
2001–2002	→ Bastia (loan)	22	(1)
2003–2004	→ Independiente (loan)	25	(1)
2006–2007	Skoda Xanthi	27	(1)
2007–2009	LDU Quito	55	(5)
2009–2010	Pachuca	51	(11)
2011	Jaguares	13	(1)
2011	Morelia	9	(1)
2012	LDU Quito	19	(1)
2012	Al Nassr	6	(0)
2013	Deportivo Cuenca	23	(4)
2013–2014	Newell's Old Boys	4	(0)
2014–2017	Chacarita Juniors	71	(5)
2017–2019	Justo José de Urquiza		
- * Club domestic league appearances and goals as of 26 October 2018

Damián Alejandro Manso (Spanish pronunciation: [daˈmjam ˈmanso], born 6 June 1979) is an Argentine professional footballer who plays as an attacking midfielder. Manso is a free kick specialist also can plays as a left midfielder, making known this facet during the period of Edgardo Bauza in 2008, when won the Copa Libertadores title under Bauza's orders as coach. He also has played at Europe in two opportunities at French side Bastia and Skoda Xanthi of the Super League Greece, began his career at professional hometown club Newell's Old Boys, where he won a league title in 2004.

== Career ==
=== Early career ===
Manso started his football career at 16 in 1996 with Newell's Old Boys in a game against Boca Juniors. Despite playing for several other teams, Manso returned to play for Newell's Old Boys several times during his career and was a member of that team for nine years of his career.

=== LDU Quito ===
Manso joined the Quito based club in mid-2007 from Skoda Xanthi. He established himself as a very capable play-maker in the latter half of the season, helping his team earn their 9th national title that same season and a berth in the 2008 Copa Libertadores

In 2008, Manso further enhanced his reputation as a play-maker while playing in the 2008 Copa Libertadores. He scored key goals and created important plays which helped LDU Quito win the tournament for the first time. LDU Quito therefore became the first and only team from Ecuador to ever win this prestigious trophy. Due to his skills, he was voted as part of the ideal Copa Libertadores team, along with fellow playmates, Enrique Vera, and Joffre Guerrón. At the 2008 FIFA Club World Cup, he again was vital to the team, helping LDU Quito advance to the final against Manchester United, which they lost. Manso was awarded the Bronze Ball for his performance in the tournament.

=== Al Nassr ===
Manso went to Al Nassr FC in Asia where he left his old team Liga de Quito.

=== Deportivo Cuenca ===
On 6 January 2013, Manso signed for Ecuadorian club Deportivo Cuenca.

=== Newell's Old Boys ===
Manso re-signed for his boyhood club on 22 July 2013, however only managing to play 4 games with all his appearances being made as a substitute.

=== Chacarita Juniors ===
On 30 June 2014, Manso signed for Chacarita Juniors. In 2016 his side finished runner's up in the Primera B Nacional.

== Honors ==
Newell's Old Boys

- Torneo Apertura: 2004

LDU Quito

- Ecuadorian Serie A: 2007
- Copa Libertadores: 2008

Pachuca

- CONCACAF Champions League: 2009–10

=== Individual ===
- FIFA Club World Cup Bronze Ball: 2008
