= Pedro Larrea =

Ecuadorian footballer (born 1986)

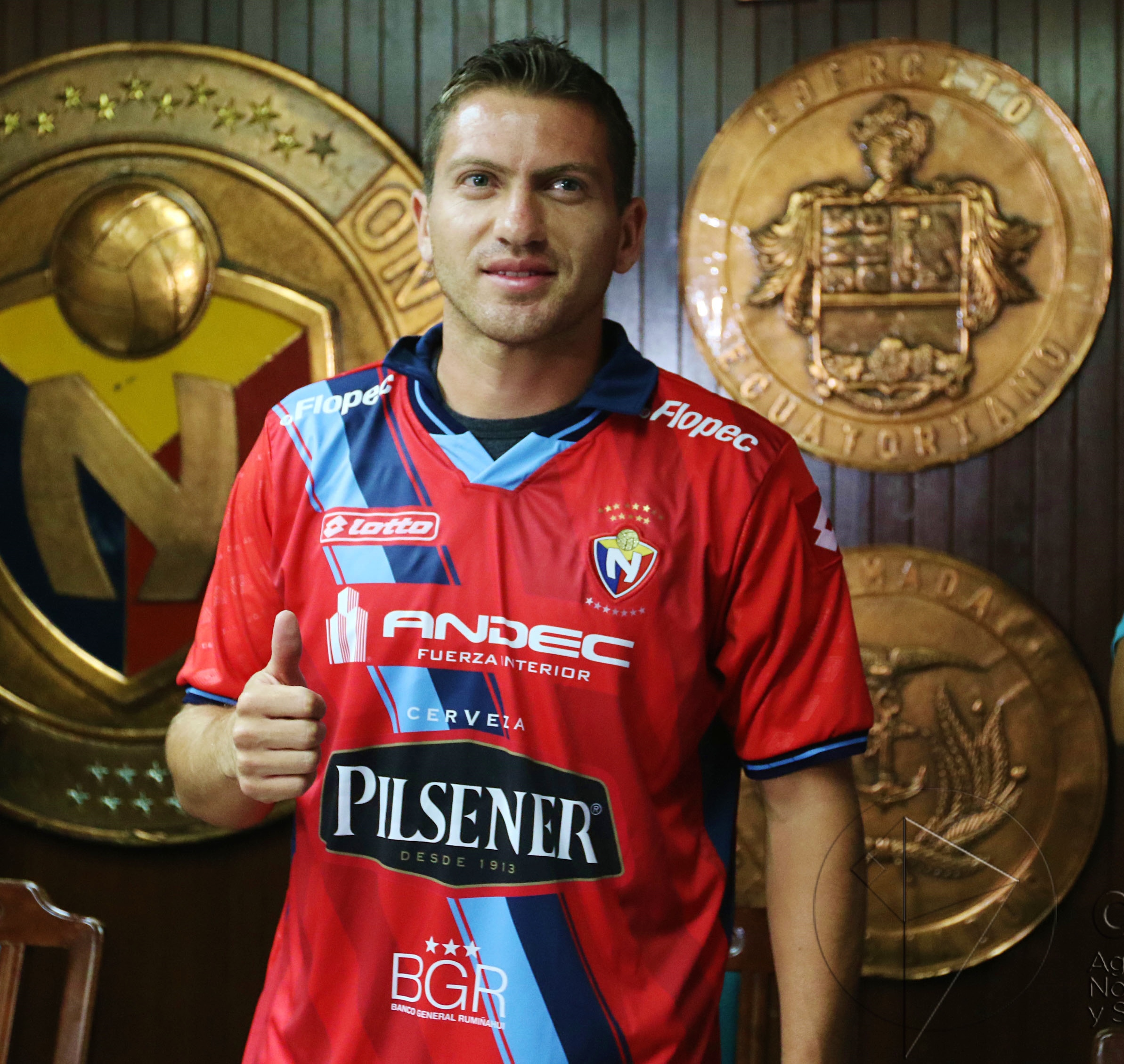
- Larrea with El Nacional in 2016

Personal information
- Full name: Pedro Sebastián Larrea Arellano
- Date of birth: 21 May 1986 (age 40)
- Place of birth: Loja, Ecuador
- Height: 1.73 m (5 ft 8 in)
- Position: Central midfielder

Youth career
- 2001–2003: L.D.U. Quito

Senior career*
Years	Team	Apps	(Gls)
2003–2009	L.D.U. Quito	85	(1)
2010	→ Macará (loan)	37	(3)
2011	Barcelona SC	12	(0)
2012–2015	L.D.U. Loja	140	(9)
2016–2018	El Nacional	69	(2)
2018–2021	Deportivo Cuenca	66	(1)
2022–2024	Libertad F.C.	55	(1)

International career^{‡}
2016	Ecuador	1	(0)
- * Club domestic league appearances and goals as of 23 November 2024 ‡ National team caps and goals as of 26 May 2016

Pedro Sebastián Larrea Arellano (born 21 May 1986, in Loja) is an Ecuadorian former footballer who played as a central midfielder.

== Club career ==
Larrea has always played for L.D.U. Quito. He plays as a central midfielder and was often used as a starter whenever Patricio Urrutia can't play. He played in the 2008 Copa Sudamericana as a replacement for Urrutia against Boca Juniors. Liga went on to lose to them 5-1 aggregate.

In the 2008 FIFA Club World Cup, Larrea made two substitute appearances. In the semi-final encounter with Pachuca, he came on in the last two minutes of the game. He provided an assist for Reinaldo Navia but Navia could not score the goal. He also came on in the last minutes of the final.

In 2009, Larrea began having a more starting role in the squad. He scored his first goal in a 1–1 tie against Emelec in the Ecuadorian Copa Credife. The impressive goal was made from 30 meters out and was named the goal of the week by Ecuadorian newspaper El Comercio.

On 21 January 2016, it was confirmed that Larrea would be joining El Nacional.

== International career ==
Larrea made his first appearance for the Ecuador national football team in a friendly 1–0 loss to the USA in May 2016.

== Career statistics ==
=== Club ===
As of 23 November 2024

Club	Division	Season	League		Cup		Continental		Total	
Club	Division	Season	Apps	Goals	Apps	Goals	Apps	Goals	Apps	Goals
L.D.U. Quito	Serie A	2003	1	0	—		—		1	0
L.D.U. Quito	Serie A	2004	0	0	—		—		0	0
L.D.U. Quito	Serie A	2005	3	0	—		—		3	0
L.D.U. Quito	Serie A	2006	22	0	—		—		22	0
L.D.U. Quito	Serie A	2007	16	0	—		—		16	0
L.D.U. Quito	Serie A	2008	22	0	—		3	0	25	0
L.D.U. Quito	Serie A	2009	21	1	—		9	0	30	1
L.D.U. Quito	Total		85	1	0	0	12	0	97	1
Macará	Serie A	2010	37	3	—		—		37	3
Barcelona SC	Serie A	2011	12	0	—		—		12	0
L.D.U. Loja	Serie A	2012	37	0	—		6	1	43	1
L.D.U. Loja	Serie A	2013	37	3	—		5	1	42	4
L.D.U. Loja	Serie A	2014	34	2	—		—		34	2
L.D.U. Loja	Serie A	2015	32	4	—		2	0	34	4
L.D.U. Loja	Total		140	9	0	0	13	2	153	11
El Nacional	Serie A	2016	32	1	—		—		32	1
El Nacional	Serie A	2017	32	1	—		2	0	34	1
El Nacional	Serie A	2018	5	0	—		1	0	6	0
El Nacional	Total		69	2	0	0	3	0	72	2
Deportivo Cuenca	Serie A	2018	19	0	—		—		19	0
Deportivo Cuenca	Serie A	2019	25	1	1	0	—		26	1
Deportivo Cuenca	Serie A	2020	12	0	—		—		12	0
Deportivo Cuenca	Serie A	2021	10	0	—		—		10	0
Deportivo Cuenca	Total		66	1	1	0	0	0	67	1
Libertad F.C.	Serie B	2022	23	0	0	0	—		23	0
Libertad F.C.	Serie A	2023	23	1	—		—		23	1
Libertad F.C.	Serie A	2024	17	0	2	0	—		19	0
Libertad F.C.	Total		63	1	2	0	0	0	65	1
Career total			472	17	3	0	28	2	503	19

== Honours ==
L.D.U. Quito

- Serie A: 2003, 2005 Apertura, 2007
- Copa Libertadores: 2008
- Recopa Sudamericana: 2009
- Copa Sudamericana: 2009
