= William Araujo =

Ecuadorian footballer (born 1979)

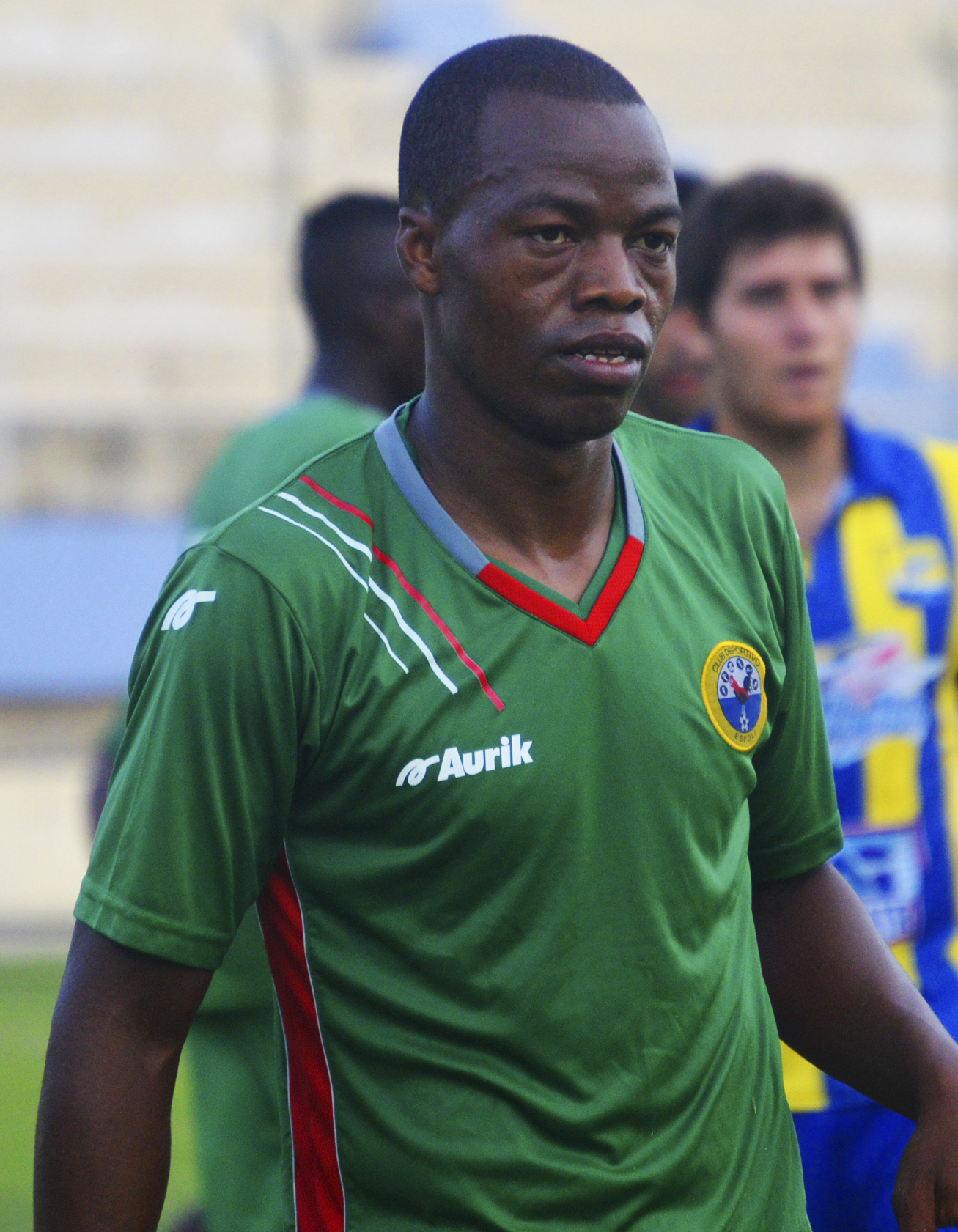
- Araujo with Espoli in 2014

Personal information
- Full name: William Francisco Araujo Ogonaga
- Date of birth: June 5, 1979 (age 47)
- Place of birth: Quito, Ecuador
- Height: 1.79 m (5 ft 10 in)
- Position: Midfielder

Team information
- Current team: Puerto Quito
- Number: 8

Youth career
- 1994–1999: Espoli
- 1999–2001: El Nacional

Senior career*
Years	Team	Apps	(Gls)
2001–2002	El Nacional	20	(0)
2002	San Pedro	14	(11)
2003	Deportivo Cuenca	18	(0)
2004	América de Quito	18	(14)
2005–2006	Espoli	43	(15)
2006	Manta	12	(5)
2007	Deportivo Azogues	40	(4)
2008–2011	L.D.U. Quito	107	(7)
2012	Técnico Universitario	18	(2)
2013	Deportivo Azogues	13	(0)
2014–2016	Espoli	107	(7)
2017–	Puerto Quito	72	(8)
- * Club domestic league appearances and goals as of October 13, 2018

William Francisco Araujo Ogonaga (born June 5, 1979) is an Ecuadorian footballer. He was part of the squad that won the 2008 Copa Libertadores.

== Honors ==
L.D.U. Quito

- Serie A: 2010
- Copa Libertadores: 2008
- Copa Sudamericana: 2009
- Recopa Sudamericana: 2009, 2010
