= Jairo Campos =

Ecuadorian footballer (born 1984)

Personal information
- Full name: Jairo Rolando Campos León
- Date of birth: July 19, 1984 (age 42)
- Place of birth: Ibarra, Ecuador
- Height: 1.80 m (5 ft 11 in)
- Position: Defender

Youth career
- 1998–2002: Barcelona

Senior career*
Years	Team	Apps	(Gls)
2003	Gent	6	(0)
2004–2005	Aucas	43	(0)
2006–2009	LDU Quito	143	(8)
2010–2011	Atlético Mineiro	15	(1)
2011	→ Deportivo Quito (loan)	36	(3)
2012–2014	Barcelona	51	(0)
2016	El Nacional	7	(0)
2017	Imbabura	2	(0)
Total		303	(12)

International career^{‡}
2004–2012	Ecuador	20	(0)
- * Club domestic league appearances and goals as of March 25, 2017 ‡ National team caps and goals as of September 11, 2012

Jairo Rolando Campos León (born July 18, 1984) is an Ecuadorian former football defender.

== Club career ==
=== Early career ===
Campos rose through the youth ranks at Guayaquil club Barcelona Sporting Club. However, he never played for the senior. He instead moved to Europe to play for Belgian club Gent in 2002. After a year and a half at the club in which he played 6 official games, he return to Ecuador to play for Quito based club Aucas. After one season with the club, he moved to cross-town rivals LDU Quito.

=== LDU Quito ===
==== 2005-2009 ====
Since joining Liga, he has become a key figure in the squad earning starting roles in important matches. He was part of the squad that won the two Ecuadorian titles (2005 Apertura and 2007). Campos participated in LDU Quito's 2008 Copa Libertadores campaign where he became instrumental as a defender for the club, stopping the likes of Salvador Cabanas and Thiago Neves. He scored the 3rd goal in his club's first leg game against Fluminense, which ended in a 4–2 home victory, and though he missed a penalty in the game-ending penalty shoot-out, he won the 2008 Copa Libertadores. He also won the 2009 Recopa Sudamericana against Internacional de Porto Alegre. His final title came against past finals rivals Fluminense, defeating them in aggregate 5–4, winning the 2009 Copa Sudamericana. He has thus helped secure 3 of 8 titles in LDU Quito's 2000-10 seasons.

=== Atlético Mineiro ===
==== 2010-11 ====
After five successful years at LDU Quito, Campos signed with Brazilian Club Atlético Mineiro on December 20, 2009.

=== Deportivo Quito ===
==== 2011 Season ====
On 20 January 2011, Campos signed for Deportivo Quito on loan from Atlético Mineiro until the end of the season. Jairo Campos once again became an important factor into an Ecuadorian club. Their most impressive defender, Campos scored 3 goals and played a great 2011 Campeonato Ecuatoriano de Fútbol Serie A which led to qualifying for the finals of the season. Campos led the club's defense, shutting out Emelec, winning both legs 1-0 and thus crowned themselves 2011 Serie A champions.

=== Barcelona SC ===
==== 2012 Season ====
In 2012 season, Campos signed a three-year contract with Barcelona SC. After being teamed up with Ecuador national football team mate Frickson Erazo, the pairing led to Barcelona Sporting Club reaching their first finals in Ecuadorian football in 15 years. His ever impressive defensive displays has led to interests of clubs from England and France, though Campos has stated he wants to be league champions before he leaves the club. On November 28, Campos became 2012 Serie A champion after SD Quito defeated Emelec 2–0, which helped Barcelona secure their first Ecuadorian league title since 1997, their 14th title in their history.

== International career ==
Jairo has participated in Ecuador's 2010 World Cup qualifying campaign. He is a key player to Sixto Vizuete's starting line-up as a center back.

== Honors ==
LDU Quito

- Serie A: 2005 Apertura, 2007
- Copa Libertadores: 2008
- Recopa Sudamericana: 2009
- Copa Sudamericana: 2009

Atlético Mineiro

- Campeonato Mineiro: 2010

Deportivo Quito

- Serie A: 2011

Barcelona SC

- Serie A: 012
