= Norberto Araujo =

Ecuadorian football central defender (born 1978)

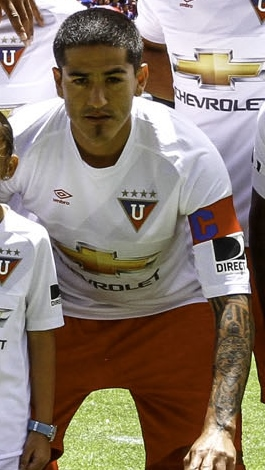

Personal information
- Full name: Norberto Carlos Araujo López
- Date of birth: 13 October 1978 (age 48)
- Place of birth: Rosario, Argentina
- Height: 1.82 m (6 ft 0 in)
- Position: Centre back

Team information
- Current team: Aucas (manager)

Youth career
- Renato Cesarini

Senior career*
| Years | Team | Apps | (Gls) |
| 1996 | TPS | 1 | (0) |
| 1996 | Kultsu | 10 | (0) |
| 1998–1999 | Aldosivi | 8 | (0) |
| 2000–2001 | Arsenal de Sarandí | 21 | (0) |
| 2001 | Racing de Córdoba | 0 | (0) |
| 2002–2003 | Sport Boys | 50 | (4) |
| 2004–2006 | Sporting Cristal | 115 | (3) |
| 2007–2017 | L.D.U. Quito | 336 | (2) |

International career
| 2011 | Ecuador | 4 | (0) |

Managerial career
- 2022–2023: Cumbayá (assistant)
- 2024: Cumbayá
- 2024–2025: Deportivo Cuenca
- 2026–: Aucas
- * Club domestic league appearances and goals

Norberto Carlos Araujo López (born 13 October 1978) is a football manager and former player who played as a central defender. He is the current manager of Aucas.

Born in Argentina, Araujo received Ecuadorian nationality in 2010, and played for the Ecuador national team in the following year.

== Club career ==
Born in Rosario (Argentina), Araujo (nicknamed Beto) started his career in Finland in 1996 playing with premier division side TPS and 1st division side Kultsu. He then returned to Argentina where he played for Aldosivi, Arsenal de Sarandí and Racing de Córdoba in the 2nd division. In 2002, he moved to Peru where he played for Sport Boys and then Sporting Cristal where he won a Peruvian league title.

In 2007, Araujo joined L.D.U. Quito in Ecuador where he helped the club to win the Serie A in his first season. In 2008, he was part of the team that won the 2008 Copa Libertadores, eliminating 3 Argentine teams, including his former club Arsenal de Sarandí and winning the cup. In 2009, he would achieve the South American treble by winning the 2009 Copa Sudamericana and 2009 Recopa Sudamericana. Later in 2010 he was part of the team that won the 2010 Ecuadorian Copa Credife and Recopa sudamericana 2010.

== International career ==
In late 2010, Araujo legally obtained his Ecuadorian citizenship, allowing him to be called up to the Ecuador national team. Despite not being called up for a number of pre-tournament friendlies, Araujo was chosen to be part of Ecuador's squad for the 2011 Copa América. He earned his first cap on 25 June 2011, versus Mexico in a friendly game prior to the start of the tournament. He went on to start in all three of Ecuador's group games in the Copa America.

== Managerial career ==
On 27 December 2023, after being Patricio Hurtado's assistant at Cumbayá, Araujo was appointed manager of the club for the 2024 season. He resigned from Cumbayá the following 26 May, as the club was plunged into an institutional crisis.

On 5 September 2024, Araujo took over Deportivo Cuenca also in the Ecuadorian top tier. He departed the club on 20 December 2025, as his contract was due to expire, and was named at the helm of fellow league team Aucas the following 9 January.

== Honours ==
Sporting Cristal

- Primera División: 2005

L.D.U. Quito

- Serie A (2): 2007, 2010
- Copa Libertadores (1): 2008
- Copa Sudamericana (1): 2009
- Recopa Sudamericana (2): 2009, 2010
