= Renán Calle =

Ecuadorian footballer (born 1976)

Personal information
- Full name: Renán Calle Camacho
- Date of birth: August 9, 1976 (age 50)
- Place of birth: Shushufindi, Sucumbíos, Ecuador
- Height: 1.81 m (5 ft 11 in)
- Position: Defender

Senior career*
Years	Team	Apps	(Gls)
1996–1999	Aucas	88	(5)
2000–2001	El Nacional	28	(2)
2002–2005	Aucas	133	(8)
2006	El Nacional	20	(1)
2007–2010	LDU Quito	67	(4)
2011	LDU Loja	24	(0)
Total		359	(2)

International career
1999–2007	Ecuador	13	(1)
- * Club domestic league appearances and goals as of July 10, 2012

Renán Calle Camacho (born August 9, 1976) is a retired Ecuadorian football defender.

== Club career ==
Calle started his professional playing career in 1999 with Aucas. He had a short spell with El Nacional before returning to Aucas in 2002.

In 2006 Calle returned to El Nacional where he was part of the championship winning team in 2006.

In 2007, he joined LDU Quito where he was part of the team that won the 2007 Ecuadorian Championship. In 2008 he was one of the key members of the LDU squad that won the Copa Libertadores.

== Honors ==
El Nacional

- Serie A: 2006

LDU Quito

- Serie A: 2007, 2010
- Copa Libertadores: 2008
- Recopa Sudamericana: 2009, 2010
- Copa Sudamericana: 2009
