= 2004 Liga Deportiva Universitaria de Quito season =

LDU Quito
2004 season
- President: Darío Ávila
- Manager: Jorge Fossati (until April 21); Daniel Carreño (from April 22 to August 18); Juan Carlos Oblitas (from August 20)
- Stadium: Estadio Casa Blanca
- Serie A: 3rd
- Copa Libertadores: Round of 16
- Copa Sudamericana: Semifinals
- Top goalscorer: League: Franklin Salas (9 goals); All: Elkin Murillo (14 goals)
Home colours	Away colours	Third colours

Liga Deportiva Universitaria de Quito's 2004 season was the club's 74th year of existence, the 51st year in professional football, and the 43rd in the top level of professional football in Ecuador.

== Kits ==
Supplier: Umbro
Sponsor(s): Siemens Mobile, Coca-Cola, Pilsener

== Squad ==
No.	Pos.	Nation	Player
—	GK	ECU	Jacinto Espinoza
—	GK	ECU	Omar Estrada
—	GK	ECU	Luis Preti
—	GK	ECU	Erwin Ramírez
—	DF	ECU	Darío Chalá
—	DF	ECU	Geovanny Cumbicus
—	DF	PAR	Carlos Espínola
—	DF	ECU	Giovanny Espinoza
—	DF	ECU	Luis Gómez
—	DF	ECU	Santiago Jácome
—	DF	ECU	Néicer Reasco
—	DF	ECU	Juan Pablo Romero
—	MF	ECU	Álex Aguinaga
—	MF	ECU	Paúl Ambrosi
—	MF	ECU	Luis Bolaños
—	MF	ECU	Nixon Carcelén

No.	Pos.	Nation	Player
—	MF	COL	Álex Escobar
—	MF	ECU	Luis González
—	MF	ECU	Walter Iza
—	MF	COL	David Montoya
—	MF	COL	Elkin Murillo
—	MF	ECU	Alfonso Obregón (captain)
—	MF	ECU	Marwin Pita
—	MF	ECU	Patricio Urrutia
—	FW	ECU	Orlindo Ayoví
—	FW	COL	Carlos Castillo
—	FW	ARG	Carlos Alberto Juárez
—	FW	ECU	Tyrone Macías
—	FW	ECU	Víctor Macías
—	FW	PAR	Juan Ángel Paredes
—	FW	ECU	Franklin Salas
—	FW	PAR	Carlos Villagra

== Competitions ==
=== Serie A ===
==== First stage ====
Pos	Team	Pld	W	D	L	GF	GA	GD	Pts	Qualification
1	Aucas	18	10	6	2	31	15	+16	36	2004 Copa Sudamericana Preliminary Phase and the Liguilla Final
2	LDU Quito	18	9	3	6	33	26	+7	30	2004 Copa Sudamericana Preliminary Phase and the Liguilla Final
3	Deportivo Cuenca	18	8	5	5	21	15	+6	29	Qualified to the Liguilla Final
4	Emelec	18	9	1	8	26	21	+5	28	
5	El Nacional	18	7	5	6	26	25	+1	26	
6	Deportivo Quito	18	7	4	7	28	32	−4	25	
7	Olmedo	18	6	6	6	23	23	0	24	
8	Barcelona	18	4	6	8	20	25	−5	18	
9	ESPOLI	18	3	8	7	14	23	−9	17	
10	Macará	18	2	6	10	16	33	−17	12	

Updated to match(es) played on May 23, 2004. Source: RSSSF
Rules for classification: 1) points; 2) goal difference; 3) number of goals scored.

===== Results =====
Home \ Away	SDA	BSC	CDC	SDQ	EN	CSE	CDE	LDU	MAC	CDO
Aucas								5–1		
Barcelona								5–2		
Deportivo Cuenca								0–1		
Deportivo Quito								2–3		
El Nacional								1–1		
Emelec								2–0		
ESPOLI								0–0		
LDU Quito	2–3	3–1	0–1	1–2	2–0	2–0	3–0		3–1	2–2
Macará								1–6		
Olmedo								0–1		

Source: RSSSF
Legend: Blue = home team win; Yellow = draw; Red = away team win.

==== Second Stage ====
Pos	Team	Pld	W	D	L	GF	GA	GD	Pts	Qualification
1	Barcelona	18	10	4	4	36	22	+14	34	Qualified to the Liguilla Final
2	Olmedo	18	8	7	3	34	25	+9	31	Qualified to the Liguilla Final
3	El Nacional	18	9	4	5	21	17	+4	31	Qualified to the Liguilla Final
4	Deportivo Quito	18	8	6	4	37	26	+11	30	
5	Deportivo Cuenca	18	8	4	6	24	21	+3	28	
6	Aucas	18	7	5	6	22	20	+2	26	
7	Emelec	18	5	7	6	27	33	−6	22	
8	LDU Quito	18	6	2	10	23	27	−4	20	
9	Macará	18	3	6	9	17	32	−15	15	
10	ESPOLI	18	2	3	13	15	33	−18	9	

Updated to match(es) played on October 3, 2004. Source: RSSSF
Rules for classification: 1) points; 2) goal difference; 3) number of goals scored.

===== Results =====
Home \ Away	SDA	BSC	CDC	SDQ	EN	CSE	CDE	LDU	MAC	CDO
Aucas								1–1		
Barcelona								2–1		
Deportivo Cuenca								0–1		
Deportivo Quito								2–1		
El Nacional								1–0		
Emelec								1–0		
ESPOLI								0–2		
LDU Quito	0–1	2–1	2–3	0–2	3–2	5–2	2–1		2–2	1–3
Macará								1–0		
Olmedo								2–0		

Source: RSSSF
Legend: Blue = home team win; Yellow = draw; Red = away team win.

==== Liguilla Final ====
Pos	Team	Pld	W	D	L	GF	GA	GD	BP	Pts	Qualification
1	Deportivo Cuenca (C)	10	6	1	3	16	13	+3	0.5	19.5	2005 Copa Libertadores Second Stage
2	Olmedo	10	6	0	4	16	14	+2	1	19	2005 Copa Libertadores Second Stage
3	LDU Quito	10	5	2	3	13	9	+4	1	18	2005 Copa Libertadores First Stage
4	El Nacional	10	4	3	3	17	16	+1	0.5	15.5	
5	Barcelona	10	3	2	5	14	16	−2	2	13	
6	Aucas	10	1	2	7	11	19	−8	2	7	

Updated to match(es) played on December 19, 2004. Source: RSSSF
Rules for classification: 1) points; 2) goal difference; 3) number of goals scored. Includes Bonus Points earned in the previous stages.
(C) Champions

===== Results =====
Home \ Away	SDA	BSC	CDC	EN	LDU	CDO
Aucas					0–2	
Barcelona					0–2	
Deportivo Cuenca					1–1	
El Nacional					1–0	
LDU Quito	1–0	1–0	1–2	1–1		2–0
Olmedo					4–2	

Source: RSSSF
Legend: Blue = home team win; Yellow = draw; Red = away team win.

=== Copa Libertadores ===
==== Copa Libertadores squad ====
No.	Pos.	Nation	Player
1	GK	ECU	Jacinto Espinoza (captain)
3	DF	ECU	Santiago Jácome
4	MF	ECU	Paúl Ambrosi
5	MF	ECU	Alfonso Obregón
6	MF	ECU	Nixon Carcelén
8	MF	ECU	Patricio Urrutia
9	FW	PAR	Juan Ángel Paredes
10	MF	COL	Alex Escobar
11	FW	ECU	Franklin Salas
12	GK	ECU	Erwin Ramírez
13	DF	ECU	Néicer Reasco

No.	Pos.	Nation	Player
14	DF	ECU	Luis Gómez
15	MF	ECU	Luis González
16	MF	COL	Elkin Murillo
17	DF	ECU	Giovanny Espinoza
18	MF	ECU	Walter Iza
19	FW	PAR	Carlos Villagra
20	MF	ECU	Álex Aguinaga
21	FW	ECU	Víctor Macías
22	GK	ECU	Omar Estrada
23	DF	PAR	Carlos Espínola

Overall								Home						Away					
Pld	W	D	L	GF	GA	GD	Pts	W	D	L	GF	GA	GD	W	D	L	GF	GA	GD
8	5	0	3	17	7	+10	15	4	0	0	15	3	+12	1	0	3	2	4	−2

==== First stage ====
Pos	Team	Pld	W	D	L	GF	GA	GD	Pts	SÃO	LDU	ALI	COB
1	(Brazil) São Paulo	6	5	0	1	11	7	+4	15		1–0	3–1	3–1
2	(Ecuador) LDU Quito	6	4	0	2	13	3	+10	12	3–0		3–0	5–1
3	(Peru) Alianza Lima	6	3	0	3	6	8	−2	9	1–2	1–0		2–0
4	(Chile) Cobreloa	6	0	0	6	3	15	−12	0	1–2	0–1	0–2	

Legend: Blue = home team win; Yellow = draw; Red = away team win.

February 10 First Stage	Cobreloa (Chile)	0–2	(Ecuador) LDU Quito	Calama, Chile
17:15 UTC−04:00		Report	Aguinaga 52'; Murillo 90+2'	Stadium: Estadio Municipal de Calama; Referee: Hebert Aguilera (Bolivia)

February 25 First Stage	LDU Quito (Ecuador)	3–0	(Peru) Alianza Lima	Quito, Ecuador
21:30 UTC−05:00	Paredes 65'; Villagra 86'; Murillo 88'	Report		Stadium: Estadio Casa Blanca; Referee: Juan Paniagua (Bolivia)

March 4 First Stage	LDU Quito (Ecuador)	3–0	(Brazil) São Paulo	Quito, Ecuador
19:15 UTC−05:00	Paredes 39'; Espinoza 45'; Urrutia 81'	Report		Stadium: Estadio Casa Blanca; Referee: Héctor Baldassi (Argentina)

March 10 First Stage	São Paulo (Brazil)	1–0	(Ecuador) LDU Quito	São Paulo, Brazil
21:45 UTC−03:00	Luís Fabiano 74'	Report		Stadium: Estádio do Morumbi; Referee: Gabriel Brazenas (Argentina)

March 25 First Stage	Alianza Lima (Peru)	1–0	(Ecuador) LDU Quito	Lima, Peru
21:30 UTC−05:00	Farfán 43'	Report		Stadium: Estadio Alejandro Villanueva; Referee: Alberto Duque (Colombia)

April 7 First Stage	LDU Quito (Ecuador)	5–1	(Chile) Cobreloa	Quito, Ecuador
19:45 UTC−05:00	Murillo 8', 27'; Reasco 29'; Paredes 31'; Carlos Espínola 90+1'	Report	Galáz 85'	Stadium: Estadio Casa Blanca; Referee: Luis Solórzano (Venezuela)

==== Round of 16 ====
Standings
Pos	Team	Pld	W	D	L	GF	GA	GD	Pts	Qualification
1	Santos (Brazil)	2	1	0	1	4	4	0	3	Qualified to the Quarterfinals
2	LDU Quito (Ecuador)	2	1	0	1	4	4	0	3	

May 5 Round of 16	LDU Quito (Ecuador)	4–2	(Brazil) Santos	Quito, Ecuador
21:50 UTC−05:00	Ambrosi 18', 72'; Urrutia 48'; Salas 84'	Report	Robinho 2'; Elano 4'	Stadium: Estadio Casa Blanca; Referee: Óscar Ruiz (Colombia)

May 11 Round of 16	Santos (Brazil)	2–0 (5–3 p)	(Ecuador) LDU Quito	Santos, Brazil
18:30 UTC−03:00	Diego 2', 49'	Report		Stadium: Estádio Urbano Caldeira; Referee: Carlos Amarilla (Paraguay)
	Penalties
	Robinho (penalty scored); Leandro Machado (penalty scored); Petro Casagrande (penalty scored); Paulo César (penalty scored); Léo (penalty scored)		(penalty scored) Aguinaga; (penalty missed) Obregón; (penalty scored) Salas; (penalty scored) Reasco

=== Copa Sudamericana ===
==== Copa Sudamericana squad ====
No.	Pos.	Nation	Player
1	GK	ECU	Jacinto Espinoza (captain)
2	DF	ECU	Juan Pablo Romero
3	DF	ECU	Santiago Jácome
4	MF	ECU	Paúl Ambrosi
5	MF	ECU	Alfonso Obregón
6	MF	ECU	Nixon Carcelén
7	MF	COL	David Montoya
8	MF	ECU	Patricio Urrutia
9	FW	ECU	Orlindo Ayoví
10	MF	COL	Álex Escobar
11	FW	ECU	Franklin Salas
12	GK	ECU	Erwin Ramírez

No.	Pos.	Nation	Player
13	DF	ECU	Néicer Reasco
14	DF	ECU	Luis Gómez
15	MF	ECU	Luis González
16	MF	COL	Elkin Murillo
17	DF	ECU	Giovanny Espinoza
18	MF	ECU	Walter Iza
19	FW	COL	Carlos Castillo
20	MF	ECU	Álex Aguinaga
21	FW	ECU	Víctor Macías
22	GK	ECU	Omar Estrada
23	DF	PAR	Carlos Espínola

Overall								Home						Away					
Pld	W	D	L	GF	GA	GD	Pts	W	D	L	GF	GA	GD	W	D	L	GF	GA	GD
8	4	3	1	15	9	+6	15	3	1	0	9	3	+6	1	2	1	6	6	0

==== First stage ====
First Stage standings
Pos	Team	Pld	W	D	L	GF	GA	GD	Pts
1	LDU Quito (Ecuador)	2	1	1	0	2	1	+1	4
2	Aucas (Ecuador)	2	0	1	1	1	2	−1	1

August 11 FirstStage	LDU Quito (Ecuador)	1–0	(Ecuador) Aucas	Quito, Ecuador
18:00 UTC−05:00	Carlos Espínola 18'	Report		Stadium: Estadio Casa Blanca; Referee: Pedro Ramos (Ecuador)

September 14 FirstStage	Aucas (Ecuador)	1–1	(Ecuador) LDU Quito	Quito, Ecuador
18:00 UTC−05:00	Calle 76'	Report	Urrutia 37'	Stadium: Estadio Olímpico Atahualpa; Referee: Mauricio Reinoso (Ecuador)

==== Second stage ====
Second Stage standings
Pos	Team	Pld	W	D	L	GF	GA	GD	Pts
1	LDU Quito (Ecuador)	2	1	1	0	6	2	+4	4
2	Cienciano (Peru)	2	0	1	1	2	6	−4	1

September 28 SecondStage	LDU Quito (Ecuador)	4–0	(Peru) Cienciano	Quito, Ecuador
18:00 UTC−05:00	Castillo 13'; Aguinaga 14'; Salas 22'; Arboleda 32' (o.g.)	Report		Stadium: Estadio Casa Blanca; Referee: Henry Cervantes (Colombia)

October 5 SecondStage	Cienciano (Peru)	2–2	(Ecuador) LDU Quito	Cusco, Peru
19:15 UTC−05:00	Mostto 23'; Carty 28'	Report	Aguinaga 35'; Ambrosi 83'	Stadium: Estadio Garcilaso; Referee: Rubén Selman (Chile)

==== Quarterfinals ====
Quarterfinals standings
Pos	Team	Pld	W	D	L	GF	GA	GD	Pts
1	LDU Quito (Ecuador)	2	2	0	0	5	3	+2	6
2	Santos (Brazil)	2	0	0	2	3	5	−2	0

November 3 Quarterfinals	LDU Quito (Ecuador)	3–2	(Brazil) Santos	Quito, Ecuador
18:50 UTC−05:00	Murillo 14'; Ambrosi 37'; Salas 84'	Report	William 20'; Basílio 51'	Stadium: Estadio Casa Blanca; Referee: René Ortubé (Bolivia)

November 10 Quarterfinals	Santos (Brazil)	1–2	(Ecuador) LDU Quito	Santos, Brazil
21:50 UTC−03:00	Elano 83'	Report	Aguinaga 7'; Murillo 88'	Stadium: Estádio Urbano Caldeira; Referee: Carlos Torres (Paraguay)

==== Semifinals ====
Semifinals standings
Pos	Team	Pld	W	D	L	GF	GA	GD	Pts
1	Bolívar (Bolivia)	2	1	1	0	3	2	+1	4
2	LDU Quito (Ecuador)	2	0	1	1	2	3	−1	1

November 25 Semifinals	LDU Quito (Ecuador)	1–1	(Bolivia) Bolívar	Quito, Ecuador
19:15 UTC−05:00	Murillo 63'	Report	Chiorazzo 69'	Stadium: Estadio Casa Blanca; Referee: Rubén Selman (Chile)

December 2 Semifinals	Bolívar (Bolivia)	2–1	(Ecuador) LDU Quito	La Paz, Bolivia
20:15 UTC−04:00	Chiorazzo 11'; García 48'	Report	Espinoza 50'	Stadium: Estadio Hernando Siles; Referee: Gilberto Hidalgo (Peru)
