= 2005 Liga Deportiva Universitaria de Quito season =

LDU Quito
2005 season
- President: Esteban Santos
- Manager: Juan Carlos Oblitas
- Stadium: Estadio Casa Blanca
- Serie A: Apertura: Champion (8th title); Clausura: 3rd
- Copa Libertadores: Round of 16
- Copa Sudamericana: Second Stage
- Top goalscorer: League: Ariel Graziani (16 goals - Apertura); Gabriel García (8 goals - Clausura); All: Gabriel García (22 goals)
Home colours	Away colours	Third colours

Liga Deportiva Universitaria de Quito's 2005 season was the club's 75th year of existence, the 52nd year in professional football, and the 44th in the top level of professional football in Ecuador.

== Kits ==
Supplier: Umbro
Sponsor(s): Movistar, Coca-Cola, Pilsener

== Squad ==
No.	Pos.	Nation	Player
1	GK	ECU	Jacinto Espinoza
—	GK	ECU	Cristian Mora
—	GK	ECU	Luis Preti
—	DF	ECU	Andrés Arrunátegui
—	DF	ECU	Christian Balseca
—	DF	ECU	Diego Calderón
—	DF	ECU	Jayro Campos
23	DF	PAR	Carlos Espínola
—	DF	ECU	Giovanny Espinoza
—	DF	ECU	Pedro Esterilla
—	DF	ECU	Luis Gómez
—	DF	ECU	Juan Guerrón
—	DF	ECU	Santiago Jácome
—	DF	ECU	Néicer Reasco
20	MF	ECU	Álex Aguinaga
4	MF	ECU	Paúl Ambrosi

No.	Pos.	Nation	Player
—	MF	COL	Álex Escobar
—	MF	ECU	Luis González
—	MF	ECU	Walter Iza
—	MF	ECU	Pedro Larrea
—	MF	ECU	Édison Méndez
—	MF	COL	Elkin Murillo
5	MF	ECU	Alfonso Obregón (captain)
18	MF	PER	Roberto Palacios
—	MF	ECU	Marwin Pita
—	MF	ECU	Ángel Pután
8	MF	ECU	Patricio Urrutia
—	FW	ECU	Omar Andrade
—	FW	ECU	Luis Miguel Garcés
—	FW	URU	Gabriel García
33	FW	ARG	Ariel Graziani
11	FW	ECU	Franklin Salas

== Competitions ==
=== Serie A ===
==== Campeonato Apertura ====
===== First stage =====
Pos	Team	Pld	W	D	L	GF	GA	GD	Pts	Qualification or relegation
1	LDU Quito	18	13	2	3	48	22	+26	41	2005 Copa Sudamericana First Stage & Playoffs
2	El Nacional	18	9	6	3	41	27	+14	33	2005 Copa Sudamericana First Stage & Playoffs
3	Barcelona	18	7	5	6	19	31	−12	26	Qualified to the Playoffs
4	Deportivo Cuenca	18	7	4	7	26	28	−2	25	Qualified to the Playoffs
5	LDU Loja	18	7	4	7	35	38	−3	25	Qualified to the Playoffs
6	Deportivo Quito	18	7	3	8	36	23	+13	24	Qualified to the Playoffs
7	Aucas	18	7	3	8	22	27	−5	24	Qualified to the Playoffs
8	Olmedo	18	6	5	7	22	25	−3	23	Qualified to the Playoffs
9	Emelec	18	5	5	8	24	31	−7	20	
10	Deportivo Quevedo	18	2	3	13	22	43	−21	9	Relegation to Serie B

Updated to match(es) played on July 2, 2005. Source: RSSSF
Rules for classification: 1) points; 2) goal difference; 3) number of goals scored.

====== Results ======
Home \ Away	SDA	BSC	CDC	CDQ	SDQ	EN	CSE	LDL	LDU	CDO
Aucas									2–3	
Barcelona									1–0	
Deportivo Cuenca									5–1	
Deportivo Quevedo									0–1	
Deportivo Quito									0–4	
El Nacional									4–1	
Emelec									2–2	
L.D.U. Loja									1–1	
LDU Quito	1–0	4–0	4–1	5–0	2–1	7–0	1–0	3–1		6–3
Olmedo									1–2	

Source: RSSSF
Legend: Blue = home team win; Yellow = draw; Red = away team win.

===== Quarterfinals =====
Pos	Team	Pld	W	D	L	GF	GA	GD	Pts	Qualification
1	LDU Quito	2	1	1	0	6	2	+4	4	Qualified to the Semifinals
2	Olmedo	2	0	1	1	2	6	−4	1	

July 6 Quarterfinals	Olmedo	1–1	LDU Quito	Riobamba
16:00 UTC−05:00	Hurtado 23'		Graziani 78'	Stadium: Estadio Olímpico de Riobamba; Referee: Segundo Díaz

July 10 Quarterfinals	LDU Quito	5–1	Olmedo	Quito
11:30 UTC−05:00	García 31', 59'; Ambrosi 71'; Salas 77', 83'		Burbano 27'	Stadium: Estadio Casa Blanca; Referee: Mauricio Reinoso

===== Semifinals =====
Pos	Team	Pld	W	D	L	GF	GA	GD	Pts	Qualification
1	LDU Quito	2	1	0	1	4	3	+1	3	Qualified to the Finals
2	Deportivo Cuenca	2	1	0	1	3	4	−1	3	

July 13 Semifinals	Deportivo Cuenca	2–1	LDU Quito	Cuenca
20:00 UTC−05:00	González 39'; Carnero 68'		Mina 6' (o.g.)	Stadium: Estadio Alejandro Serrano Aguilar; Referee: Carlos Vera

July 17 Semifinals	LDU Quito	3–1	Deportivo Cuenca	Quito
11:30 UTC−05:00	Palacios 35'; Urrutia 57'; García 57'		Carnero 29'	Stadium: Estadio Casa Blanca; Referee: Samuel Haro

===== Finals =====
Pos	Team	Pld	W	D	L	GF	GA	GD	Pts	Qualification
1	LDU Quito	2	1	0	1	3	1	+2	3	Champion (8th title) and qualified to the 2006 Copa Libertadores
2	Barcelona	2	1	0	1	1	3	−2	3	

July 20 Finals	Barcelona	1–0	LDU Quito	Guayaquil
19:00 UTC−05:00	Caicedo 45+1'			Stadium: Estadio Monumental Isidro Romero Carbo; Referee: Carlos Vera

July 24 Finals	LDU Quito	3–0	Barcelona	Quito
11:30 UTC−05:00	Espínola 5'; Salas 63'; Reasco 68'			Stadium: Estadio Casa Blanca; Referee: Samuel Haro

==== Campeonato Clausura ====
===== First stage =====
Pos	Team	Pld	W	D	L	GF	GA	GD	Pts	Qualification or relegation
1	El Nacional	18	9	4	5	42	27	+15	31	Qualified to the Liguilla Final
2	Aucas	18	9	2	7	28	21	+7	29	Qualified to the Liguilla Final
3	Olmedo	18	7	6	5	25	23	+2	27	Qualified to the Liguilla Final
4	Deportivo Cuenca	18	6	9	3	19	19	0	27	Qualified to the Liguilla Final
5	LDU Quito	18	7	5	6	25	20	+5	26	Qualified to the Liguilla Final
6	Barcelona	18	7	5	6	26	25	+1	26	Qualified to the Liguilla Final
7	ESPOLI	18	7	2	9	29	31	−2	23	
8	Deportivo Quito	18	5	8	5	21	27	−6	23	
9	Emelec	18	5	6	7	20	25	−5	21	
10	LDU Loja	18	2	5	11	22	39	−17	11	Relegation to Serie B

Source: RSSSF
Rules for classification: 1) points; 2) goal difference; 3) number of goals scored.

====== Results ======
Home \ Away	SDA	BSC	CDC	SDQ	EN	CSE	CDE	LDL	LDU	CDO
Aucas									2–1	
Barcelona									1–0	
Deportivo Cuenca									0–0	
Deportivo Quito									1–1	
El Nacional									2–3	
Emelec									1–0	
ESPOLI									2–0	
L.D.U. Loja									2–2	
LDU Quito	0–3	3–0	2–0	1–1	2–1	0–0	3–2	3–0		1–2
Olmedo									0–3	

Source: RSSSF
Legend: Blue = home team win; Yellow = draw; Red = away team win.

===== Liguilla Final =====
Pos	Team	Pld	W	D	L	GF	GA	GD	BP	Pts	Qualification
1	El Nacional	10	7	1	2	23	9	+14	3	25	2006 Copa Libertadores Second Stage
2	Deportivo Cuenca	10	6	2	2	12	10	+2	0	20	2006 Copa Libertadores First Stage
3	LDU Quito	10	5	2	3	20	13	+7	0	17	
4	Aucas	10	3	1	6	17	24	−7	2	12	
5	Olmedo	10	2	2	6	7	15	−8	1	9	
6	Barcelona	10	2	2	6	6	14	−8	0	8	

Source: RSSSF
Rules for classification: 1) points; 2) goal difference; 3) number of goals scored. Included Bonus Points earned in the First Stage.

====== Results ======
Home \ Away	SDA	BSC	CDC	EN	LDU	CDO
Aucas					3–1	
Barcelona					0–1	
Deportivo Cuenca					0–0	
El Nacional					2–3	
LDU Quito	4–1	4–1	1–1	1–3		5–1
Olmedo					1–0	

Source: RSSSF
Legend: Blue = home team win; Yellow = draw; Red = away team win.

=== Copa Libertadores ===
==== Copa Libertadores Squad ====
No.	Pos.	Nation	Player
1	GK	ECU	Jacinto Espinoza
2	DF	ECU	Pedro Esterilla
3	DF	ECU	Santiago Jácome
4	MF	ECU	Paúl Ambrosi
5	MF	ECU	Alfonso Obregón (captain)
6	DF	ECU	Jayro Campos
7	FW	URU	Gabriel García
8	MF	ECU	Patricio Urrutia
9	FW	ARG	Ariel Graziani
10	MF	COL	Alex Escobar
11	FW	ECU	Franklin Salas
12	GK	ECU	Cristian Mora

No.	Pos.	Nation	Player
13	DF	ECU	Néicer Reasco
14	DF	ECU	Luis Gómez
15	MF	ECU	Luis González
16	MF	COL	Elkin Murillo
17	DF	ECU	Giovanny Espinoza
18	MF	PER	Roberto Palacios
19	FW	ECU	Luis Miguel Garcés
20	MF	ECU	Álex Aguinaga
21	MF	ECU	Walter Iza
22	MF	ECU	Édison Méndez
23	DF	PAR	Carlos Espínola

Overall								Home						Away					
Pld	W	D	L	GF	GA	GD	Pts	W	D	L	GF	GA	GD	W	D	L	GF	GA	GD
10	4	2	4	15	19	−4	14	4	1	0	9	3	+6	0	1	4	6	16	−10

==== First stage ====
Standings
Pos	Team	Pld	W	D	L	GF	GA	GD	Pts	Qualification
1	LDU Quito (Ecuador)	2	1	0	1	4	4	0	3	Qualified to the Second Stage
2	Peñarol (Uruguay)	2	1	0	1	4	4	0	3	

February 3 First Stage	LDU Quito (Ecuador)	3–0	(Uruguay) Peñarol	Quito, Ecuador
20:30 UTC−05:00	Salas 55'; Palacios 67'; Aguinaga 81'	Report		Stadium: Estadio Casa Blanca; Referee: Gilberto Hidalgo (Peru)

February 10 First Stage	Peñarol (Uruguay)	4–1	(Ecuador) LDU Quito	Montevideo, Uruguay
19:30 UTC−03:00	Obregón 5' (o.g.); Gaglianone 46'; Pierre 70'; Tejera 90+1'	Report	Méndez 21'	Stadium: Estadio Centenario; Referee: Paulo César de Oliveira (Brazil)

==== Second stage ====
Group 2 standings
Pos	Team	Pld	W	D	L	GF	GA	GD	Pts	Qualification
1	São Paulo (Brazil)	6	4	0	2	18	10	+8	12	Qualified to the Round of 16
2	LDU Quito (Ecuador)	6	2	2	2	7	10	−3	8	Qualified to the Round of 16
3	Danubio (Uruguay)	6	2	1	3	9	8	+1	7	
4	Bolívar (Bolivia)	6	2	1	3	8	14	−6	7	

February 24 Second Stage	Danubio (Uruguay)	3–0	(Ecuador) LDU Quito	Montevideo, Uruguay
19:30 UTC−03:00	Risso 1'; González 7'; Pouso 79'	Report		Stadium: Estadio Luis Franzini; Referee: Ricardo Grance (Paraguay)

March 8 Second Stage	LDU Quito (Ecuador)	1–0	(Bolivia) Bolívar	Quito, Ecuador
	Méndez 25'	Report		Stadium: Estadio Casa Blanca; Referee: Óscar Ruiz (Colombia)

March 17 Second Stage	LDU Quito (Ecuador)	2–1	(Brazil) Santos	Quito, Ecuador
16:45 UTC−05:00	Graziani 8'; Salas 13'	Report	Ricardinho 26'	Stadium: Estadio Casa Blanca; Referee: Carlos Amarilla (Paraguay)

April 6 Second Stage	Santos (Brazil)	3–1	(Ecuador) LDU Quito	Santos, Brazil
21:50 UTC−03:00	Robinho 20', 60'; Ricardinho 48'	Report	Urrutia 2'	Stadium: Estádio Urbano Caldeira; Referee: Horacio Elizondo (Argentina)

April 27 Second Stage	Bolívar (Bolivia)	2–2	(Ecuador) LDU Quito	La Paz, Bolivia
18:00 UTC−04:00	Zermatten 18'; Gutiérrez 33'	Report	Espínola 55'; Palacios 63'	Stadium: Estadio Hernando Siles; Referee: Alberto Duque (Colombia)

May 11 Second Stage	LDU Quito (Ecuador)	1–1	(Uruguay) Danubio	Quito, Ecuador
17:30 UTC−05:00	Méndez 77'	Report	Risso 27'	Stadium: Estadio Casa Blanca; Referee: Óscar Ruiz (Colombia)

==== Round of 16 ====
Standings
Pos	Team	Pld	W	D	L	GF	GA	GD	Pts	Qualification
1	River Plate (Argentina)	2	1	0	1	4	5	−1	3	Qualified to the Quarterfinals
2	LDU Quito (Ecuador)	2	1	0	1	5	4	+1	3	

May 17 Round of 16	LDU Quito (Ecuador)	2–1	(Argentina) River Plate	Quito, Ecuador
20:30 UTC−05:00	Urrutia 35' (pen.), 72'	Report	Patiño 40'	Stadium: Estadio Casa Blanca; Referee: Carlos Chandía (Chile)

May 26 Round of 16	River Plate (Argentina)	4–2	(Ecuador) LDU Quito	Buenos Aires, Argentina
21:15 UTC−03:00	Salas 6', 11', 48'; González 60'	Report	Palacios 46'; Espínola 66'	Stadium: Estadio Monumental Antonio Vespucio Liberti; Referee: Carlos Amarilla (Paraguay)

=== Copa Sudamericana ===
==== Copa Sudamericana squad ====
No.	Pos.	Nation	Player
1	GK	ECU	Jacinto Espinoza
2	DF	ECU	Juan Guerrón
3	DF	ECU	Santiago Jácome
4	MF	ECU	Paúl Ambrosi
5	MF	ECU	Alfonso Obregón (captain)
6	DF	ECU	Jayro Campos
7	FW	URU	Gabriel García
8	MF	ECU	Patricio Urrutia
10	MF	PER	Roberto Palacios
11	FW	ECU	Franklin Salas
12	GK	ECU	Cristian Mora

No.	Pos.	Nation	Player
13	DF	ECU	Néicer Reasco
14	DF	ECU	Luis Gómez
15	MF	ECU	Luis González
16	MF	COL	Elkin Murillo
17	DF	ECU	Giovanny Espinoza
19	FW	ECU	Luis Miguel Garcés
20	MF	ECU	Álex Aguinaga
22	MF	ECU	Édison Méndez
23	DF	PAR	Carlos Espínola
24	FW	ECU	Omar Andrade

Overall								Home						Away					
Pld	W	D	L	GF	GA	GD	Pts	W	D	L	GF	GA	GD	W	D	L	GF	GA	GD
4	1	0	3	6	10	−4	3	0	0	2	1	5	−4	1	0	1	5	5	0

==== First stage ====
First Stage standings
Pos	Team	Pld	W	D	L	GF	GA	GD	Pts
1	LDU Quito (Ecuador)	2	1	0	1	5	5	0	3
2	El Nacional (Ecuador)	2	1	0	1	5	5	0	3

August 9 First Stage	El Nacional (Ecuador)	3–4	(Ecuador) LDU Quito	Quito, Ecuador
20:15 UTC−05:00	Quiroz 36'; Chalá 59'; García 78'	Report	Garcés 20'; Salas 40'; Reasco 72'; Castillo 85' (o.g.)	Stadium: Estadio Olímpico Atahualpa; Referee: Samuel Haro (Ecuador)

August 25 First Stage	LDU Quito (Ecuador)	1–2	(Ecuador) El Nacional	Quito, Ecuador
20:30 UTC−05:00	Palacios 83'	Report	Lara 12'; Quiroz 57' (pen.)	Stadium: Estadio Casa Blanca; Referee: Tomás Alarcón (Ecuador)

==== Second stage ====
Second Stage standings
Pos	Team	Pld	W	D	L	GF	GA	GD	Pts
1	The Strongest (Bolivia)	2	2	0	0	5	1	+4	6
2	LDU Quito (Ecuador)	2	0	0	2	1	5	−4	0

August 30 Second Stage	The Strongest (Bolivia)	2–1	(Ecuador) LDU Quito	La Paz, Bolivia
19:00 UTC−04:00	Escobar 54'; Coelho 67'	Report	Reasco 37'	Stadium: Estadio Hernando Siles; Referee: Ricardo Grance (Paraguay)

September 8 Second Stage	LDU Quito (Ecuador)	0–3	(Bolivia) The Strongest	Quito, Ecuador
18:15 UTC−05:00		Report	Coelho 22'; Escobar 52'; Cristaldo 68'	Stadium: Estadio Casa Blanca; Referee: Víctor Hugo Rivera (Peru)
