= 2003 Liga Deportiva Universitaria de Quito season =

LDU Quito
2003 season
- President: Darío Ávila
- Manager: Jorge Fossati
- Stadium: Estadio Casa Blanca
- Serie A: Champions (7th title)
- Copa Sudamericana: Second Stage
- Top goalscorer: League: Virgilio Ferreira (11 goals); All: Virgilio Ferreira (12 goals)
Home colours	Away colours	Third colours

Liga Deportiva Universitaria de Quito's 2003 season was the club's 73rd year of existence, the 50th year in professional football, and the 42nd in the top level of professional football in Ecuador.

== Kits ==
Supplier: Umbro
Sponsor(s): Siemens Mobile, Coca-Cola, Almacenes Japón

== Squad ==
No.	Pos.	Nation	Player
—	GK	ECU	Jacinto Espinoza
—	GK	ECU	Omar Estrada
—	GK	ECU	Erwin Ramírez
—	DF	ECU	Darío Chalá
—	DF	ECU	Geovanny Cumbicus
—	DF	PAR	Carlos Espínola
—	DF	ECU	Giovanny Espinoza
—	DF	ECU	Santiago Jácome
—	DF	ECU	Carlos Ordóñez
—	DF	ECU	Néicer Reasco
—	DF	ECU	José Tenorio
—	MF	ECU	Paúl Ambrosi
—	MF	ECU	Luis Bolaños
—	MF	ECU	Nixon Carcelén
—	MF	ECU	José Chávez
—	MF	COL	Álex Escobar

No.	Pos.	Nation	Player
—	MF	ECU	Luis González
—	MF	ECU	Camilo Hurtado
—	MF	ECU	Alfonso Obregón (captain)
—	MF	ECU	Marwin Pita
—	MF	ECU	Patricio Urrutia
—	FW	ECU	Diego Ayala
—	FW	ARG	Cristian Carnero
—	FW	PAR	Virgilio Ferreira
—	FW	ECU	Tyrone Macías
—	FW	ECU	Víctor Macías
—	FW	ARG	Martín Ojeda
—	FW	URU	Ignacio Risso
—	FW	ECU	Franklin Salas
—	FW	ECU	Carlos Tenorio
—	FW	ECU	Luis Zambrano

== Competitions ==
=== Serie A ===
==== First stage ====
Pos	Team	Pld	W	D	L	GF	GA	GD	Pts	Qualification
1	Barcelona	18	12	2	4	41	19	+22	38	Qualified to the Liguilla Final
2	LDU Quito	18	10	6	2	37	24	+13	36	Qualified to the Liguilla Final
3	El Nacional	18	9	4	5	31	22	+9	31	Qualified to the Liguilla Final
4	Deportivo Quito	18	8	4	6	29	23	+6	28	
5	Emelec	18	6	8	4	26	31	−5	26	
6	Deportivo Cuenca	18	5	7	6	27	26	+1	22	
7	Aucas	18	6	4	8	24	26	−2	22	
8	Técnico Universitario	18	4	5	9	24	36	−12	17	
9	ESPOLI	18	4	3	11	25	37	−12	15	
10	Manta	18	3	3	12	17	37	−20	12	

Updated to match(es) played on June 22, 2003. Source: RSSSF
Rules for classification: 1) points; 2) goal difference; 3) number of goals scored.

===== Results =====
Home \ Away	SDA	BSC	CDC	SDQ	EN	CSE	CDE	LDU	MFC	TU
Aucas								1–2		
Barcelona								0–0		
Deportivo Cuenca								2–3		
Deportivo Quito								0–2		
El Nacional								1–1		
Emelec								3–2		
ESPOLI								0–1		
LDU Quito	6–2	1–0	4–1	0–4	2–0	1–1	2–2		3–2	2–2
Manta								0–2		
Técnico Universitario								3–3		

Source: RSSSF
Legend: Blue = home team win; Yellow = draw; Red = away team win.

==== Second stage ====
Pos	Team	Pld	W	D	L	GF	GA	GD	Pts	Qualification
1	LDU Quito	18	10	4	4	31	15	+16	34	Qualified to the Liguilla Final
2	Barcelona	18	9	7	2	28	12	+16	34	Qualified to the Liguilla Final
3	El Nacional	18	9	5	4	38	18	+20	32	Qualified to the Liguilla Final
4	Deportivo Quito	18	10	2	6	27	23	+4	32	
5	Deportivo Cuenca	18	8	3	7	22	17	+5	27	
6	Emelec	18	8	3	7	29	26	+3	27	
7	ESPOLI	18	5	6	7	24	35	−11	21	
8	Aucas	18	5	3	10	21	29	−8	18	
9	Manta	18	3	5	10	16	38	−22	14	
10	Técnico Universitario	18	2	4	12	13	36	−23	10	

Updated to match(es) played on October 12, 2003. Source: RSSSF
Rules for classification: 1) points; 2) goal difference; 3) number of goals scored.

===== Results =====
Home \ Away	SDA	BSC	CDC	SDQ	EN	CSE	CDE	LDU	MFC	TU
Aucas								0–3		
Barcelona								3–1		
Deportivo Cuenca								0–1		
Deportivo Quito								2–1		
El Nacional								3–2		
Emelec								0–1		
ESPOLI								3–4		
LDU Quito	2–0	0–0	2–0	0–0	1–2	3–1	4–0		2–0	3–0
Manta								1–1		
Técnico Universitario								0–0		

Source: RSSSF
Legend: Blue = home team win; Yellow = draw; Red = away team win.

==== Liguilla Final ====
Pos	Team	Pld	W	D	L	GF	GA	GD	BP	Pts	Qualification
1	LDU Quito (C)	10	7	0	3	19	13	+6	5	26	2004 Copa Libertadores group stage
2	Barcelona	10	6	0	4	19	9	+10	5	23	2004 Copa Libertadores group stage
3	El Nacional	10	6	0	4	21	13	+8	2	20	2004 Copa Libertadores group stage
4	Emelec	10	3	2	5	12	21	−9	0	11	
5	Deportivo Quito	10	3	1	6	11	19	−8	0	10	
6	Deportivo Cuenca	10	3	1	6	17	26	−9	0	10	

Updated to match(es) played on December 21, 2003. Source: RSSSF
Rules for classification: 1) points; 2) goal difference; 3) number of goals scored. Includes Bonus Points earned in the previous stages.
(C) Champions

===== Results =====
Home \ Away	BSC	CDC	SDQ	EN	CSE	LDU
Barcelona						4–0
Deportivo Cuenca						1–3
Deportivo Quito						1–0
El Nacional						0–1
Emelec						4–1
LDU Quito	1–0	5–0	4–2	2–1	2–0	

Source: RSSSF
Legend: Blue = home team win; Yellow = draw; Red = away team win.

=== Copa Sudamericana ===
==== Copa Sudamericana squad ====
No.	Pos.	Nation	Player
1	GK	ECU	Jacinto Espinoza
2	DF	PAR	Carlos Espínola
3	DF	ECU	Santiago Jácome
4	MF	ECU	Paúl Ambrosi
5	MF	ECU	Alfonso Obregón (captain)
6	MF	ECU	Nixon Carcelén
7	FW	PAR	Virgilio Ferreira
8	MF	ECU	Patricio Urrutia
9	FW	ECU	Luis Zambrano
10	MF	COL	Álex Escobar
11	FW	ECU	Franklin Salas
12	GK	ECU	Erwin Ramírez

No.	Pos.	Nation	Player
13	DF	ECU	Néicer Reasco
14	FW	ARG	Martín Ojeda
15	MF	ECU	Luis González
16	MF	URU	Ignacio Risso
17	DF	ECU	Giovanny Espinoza
18	FW	ECU	Carlos Tenorio
19	FW	ECU	Diego Ayala
20	DF	ECU	Geovanny Cumbicus
21	MF	ECU	Tyrone Macías
22	GK	ECU	Omar Estrada
25	MF	ECU	Camilo Hurtado

Overall								Home						Away					
Pld	W	D	L	GF	GA	GD	Pts	W	D	L	GF	GA	GD	W	D	L	GF	GA	GD
4	1	1	2	4	4	0	4	1	1	0	3	1	+2	0	0	2	1	3	−2

==== First stage ====
First Stage standings
Pos	Team	Pld	W	D	L	GF	GA	GD	Pts
1	LDU Quito (Ecuador)	2	1	0	1	3	2	+1	3
2	Barcelona (Ecuador)	2	1	0	1	2	3	−1	3

July 29 First Stage	LDU Quito (Ecuador)	2–0	(Ecuador) Barcelona	Quito, Ecuador
19:00 UTC−05:00	Tenorio 11'; Ambrosi 43'	Report		Stadium: Estadio Casa Blanca; Referee: Segundo Díaz (Ecuador)

August 12 First Stage	Barcelona (Ecuador)	2–1	(Ecuador) LDU Quito	Guayaquil, Ecuador
17:00 UTC−05:00	Teixeira 35'; Capria 59'	Report	Ferreira 40'	Stadium: Estadio Modelo Alberto Spencer Herrera; Referee: José Carpio (Ecuador)

==== Second stage ====
Second Stage standings
Pos	Team	Pld	W	D	L	GF	GA	GD	Pts
1	Atlético Nacional (Colombia)	2	1	1	0	2	1	+1	4
2	LDU Quito (Ecuador)	2	0	1	1	1	2	−1	1

September 18 Second Stage	LDU Quito (Ecuador)	1–1	(Colombia) Atlético Nacional	Quito, Ecuador
17:30 UTC−05:00	Espinoza 47'	Report	Agudelo 52'	Stadium: Estadio Casa Blanca; Referee: Juan Paniagua (Bolivia)

October 2 Second Stage	Atlético Nacional (Colombia)	1–0	(Ecuador) LDU Quito	Medellín, Colombia
20:40 UTC−05:00	Giraldo 86'	Report		Stadium: Estadio Atanasio Girardot; Referee: Víctor Hugo Rivera (Peru)
