= 1998 Liga Deportiva Universitaria de Quito season =

LDU Quito
1998 season
- President: Darío Ávila
- Manager: Carlos Cabral; Paulo Massa
- Stadium: Estadio Casa Blanca
- Serie A: Champions (5th title)
- Copa CONMEBOL: Quarter-finals
- Top goalscorer: League: Patricio Hurtado (16 goals); All: Patricio Hurtado (16 goals)
| Home colours | Away colours |

Liga Deportiva Universitaria de Quito's 1998 season was the club's 68th year of existence. It was also their 45th year in professional football, and their 38th in the top level of professional football in Ecuador.

== Kits ==
Supplier: Umbro
Sponsor(s): La Lechera, Crunch

== Squad ==
| No. | Pos. | Nation | Player |
|---|---|---|---|
| — | GK | ECU | Jacinto Espinoza (captain) |
| — | GK | ECU | Víctor Sánchez |
| — | GK | ECU | Miguel Santillán |
| — | DF | ECU | Mario Chillagana |
| — | DF | ECU | Ulises de la Cruz |
| — | DF | ECU | Santiago Jácome |
| — | DF | BRA | Rodrigo Prado |
| — | DF | ECU | Néicer Reasco |
| — | DF | ECU | Daniel Reinoso |
| — | DF | ECU | Danilo Samaniego |
| — | DF | ECU | Byron Tenorio |
| — | MF | ECU | Jorge Benalcázar |
| — | MF | ECU | Nixon Carcelén |
| — | MF | ECU | Luis Escalante |
| — | MF | COL | Álex Escobar |
| — | MF | ECU | José Estrada |

| No. | Pos. | Nation | Player |
|---|---|---|---|
| — | MF | ECU | Luis González |
| — | MF | ECU | Juan Guamán |
| — | MF | ECU | Paúl Guevara |
| — | MF | ECU | Alfonso Obregón |
| — | MF | CHI | Eladio Rojas |
| — | MF | ECU | Hjalmar Zambrano |
| — | FW | ECU | Jhon Arteaga |
| — | FW | BRA | Flavio Camargo |
| — | FW | ECU | Segundo Escobar |
| — | FW | BRA | Mané Ferreira |
| — | FW | ECU | Gustavo Figueroa |
| — | FW | ECU | Eduardo Hurtado |
| — | FW | ECU | Patricio Hurtado |
| — | FW | URU | Carlos María Morales |
| — | FW | ECU | Pedro Salvador |

== Competitions ==
=== Serie A ===
==== First stage ====
===== First phase =====
| Pos | Team | Pld | W | D | L | GF | GA | GD | Pts | Qualification |
|---|---|---|---|---|---|---|---|---|---|---|
| 1 | LDU Quito | 22 | 11 | 6 | 5 | 40 | 27 | +13 | 43 | Qualified to the Grupo Libertadores |
| 2 | Emelec | 22 | 10 | 8 | 4 | 40 | 28 | +12 | 42 | Qualified to the Grupo Libertadores |
| 3 | Aucas | 22 | 9 | 8 | 5 | 32 | 22 | +10 | 40 | Qualified to the Grupo Libertadores |
| 4 | Olmedo | 22 | 8 | 9 | 5 | 28 | 24 | +4 | 38 | Qualified to the Grupo Libertadores |
| 5 | ESPOLI | 22 | 10 | 4 | 8 | 36 | 36 | 0 | 36 | Qualified to the Grupo CONMEBOL |
| 6 | Barcelona | 22 | 8 | 7 | 7 | 39 | 29 | +10 | 34 | Qualified to the Grupo CONMEBOL |
| 7 | Delfín | 22 | 8 | 7 | 7 | 33 | 30 | +3 | 33 | Qualified to the Grupo CONMEBOL |
| 8 | El Nacional | 22 | 8 | 5 | 9 | 35 | 27 | +8 | 31 | Qualified to the Grupo CONMEBOL |
| 9 | Deportivo Quito | 22 | 6 | 9 | 7 | 34 | 36 | −2 | 31 | Qualified to the Grupo Descenso |
| 10 | Deportivo Cuenca | 22 | 7 | 5 | 10 | 20 | 27 | −7 | 27 | Qualified to the Grupo Descenso |
| 11 | Técnico Universitario | 22 | 5 | 5 | 12 | 26 | 47 | −21 | 24 | Qualified to the Grupo Descenso |
| 12 | Panamá | 22 | 3 | 5 | 14 | 17 | 47 | −30 | 17 | Qualified to the Grupo Descenso |

Note: Penalty shootout extra points: Aucas & Olmedo (5); D. Quito, Emelec, LDU Quito & T. Universitario (4); Barcelona & Panamá (3); Delfín, El Nacional & ESPOLI (2); D. Cuenca (1)

====== Results ======
| Home \ Away | SDA | BSC | DSC | CDC | SDQ | EN | CSE | CDE | LDU | CDO | PSC | TU |
|---|---|---|---|---|---|---|---|---|---|---|---|---|
| Aucas | | | | | | | | | 1–2 | | | |
| Barcelona | | | | | | | | | 3–1 | | | |
| Delfín | | | | | | | | | 2–0 | | | |
| Deportivo Cuenca | | | | | | | | | 1–3 | | | |
| Deportivo Quito | | | | | | | | | 1–1 | | | |
| El Nacional | | | | | | | | | 3–2 | | | |
| Emelec | | | | | | | | | 4–1 | | | |
| ESPOLI | | | | | | | | | 3–4 | | | |
| LDU Quito | 2–2 | 0–0 | 4–2 | 0–1 | 0–0 | 1–0 | 6–1 | 1–1 | | 2–1 | 3–0 | 2–0 |
| Olmedo | | | | | | | | | 1–1 | | | |
| Panamá | | | | | | | | | 0–1 | | | |
| Técnico Universitario | | | | | | | | | 0–3 | | | |

Source: LDU 1998
Legend: Blue = home team win; Yellow = draw; Red = away team win.

===== Second phase =====
====== Grupo Libertadores ======
| Pos | Team | Pld | W | D | L | GF | GA | GD | Pts | Qualification |
|---|---|---|---|---|---|---|---|---|---|---|
| 1 | Emelec | 6 | 5 | 0 | 1 | 12 | 5 | +7 | 15 | Qualified to the Finals and 1999 Copa Libertadores |
| 2 | LDU Quito | 6 | 3 | 1 | 2 | 7 | 5 | +2 | 11 | |
| 3 | Aucas | 6 | 3 | 0 | 3 | 7 | 6 | +1 | 9 | |
| 4 | Olmedo | 6 | 0 | 1 | 5 | 2 | 12 | −10 | 1 | |

Note: Penalty shootout extra points: LDU Quito (1)

====== Results ======
| Home \ Away | SDA | CSE | LDU | CDO |
|---|---|---|---|---|
| Aucas | | | 0–2 | |
| Emelec | | | 1–0 | |
| LDU Quito | 1–0 | 1–3 | | 2–0 |
| Olmedo | | | 1–1 | |

Source: LDU 1998
Legend: Blue = home team win; Yellow = draw; Red = away team win.

==== Second stage ====
===== First phase =====
====== Group 2 ======
| Pos | Team | Pld | W | D | L | GF | GA | GD | Pts | Qualification |
|---|---|---|---|---|---|---|---|---|---|---|
| 1 | LDU Quito | 10 | 6 | 3 | 1 | 18 | 5 | +13 | 24 | Qualified to the Grupo Libertadores |
| 2 | Barcelona | 10 | 6 | 2 | 2 | 17 | 7 | +10 | 21 | Qualified to the Grupo Libertadores |
| 3 | Olmedo | 10 | 3 | 2 | 5 | 14 | 19 | −5 | 13 | Qualified to the Grupo CONMEBOL |
| 4 | Deportivo Cuenca | 10 | 2 | 4 | 4 | 11 | 16 | −5 | 11 | Qualified to the Grupo CONMEBOL |
| 5 | Técnico Universitario | 10 | 1 | 6 | 3 | 10 | 17 | −7 | 11 | Qualified to the Grupo Descenso |
| 6 | Delfín | 10 | 2 | 3 | 5 | 16 | 22 | −6 | 10 | Qualified to the Grupo Descenso |

Note: Penalty shootout extra points: LDU Quito (3); Olmedo & T. Universitario (2); Barcelona, Delfín & D. Cuenca (1)

====== Results ======
| Home \ Away | BSC | DSC | CDC | LDU | CDO | TU |
|---|---|---|---|---|---|---|
| Barcelona | | | | 1–0 | | |
| Delfín | | | | 2–2 | | |
| Deportivo Cuenca | | | | 0–2 | | |
| LDU Quito | 0–0 | 4–0 | 1–0 | | 3–2 | 4–0 |
| Olmedo | | | | 0–2 | | |
| Técnico Universitario | | | | 0–0 | | |

Source: LDU 1998
Legend: Blue = home team win; Yellow = draw; Red = away team win.

===== Second phase =====
====== Grupo Libertadores ======
| Pos | Team | Pld | W | D | L | GF | GA | GD | Pts | Qualification |
|---|---|---|---|---|---|---|---|---|---|---|
| 1 | LDU Quito | 6 | 3 | 2 | 1 | 9 | 6 | +3 | 11 | Qualified to the Finals and 1999 Copa Libertadores |
| 2 | Barcelona | 6 | 2 | 2 | 2 | 9 | 6 | +3 | 10 | |
| 3 | Aucas | 6 | 3 | 1 | 2 | 7 | 6 | +1 | 10 | |
| 4 | Deportivo Quito | 6 | 1 | 1 | 4 | 3 | 10 | −7 | 5 | |

Note: Penalty shootout extra points: Barcelona (2); D. Quito (1)

====== Results ======
| Home \ Away | SDA | BSC | SDQ | LDU |
|---|---|---|---|---|
| Aucas | | | | 2–1 |
| Barcelona | | | | 2–2 |
| Deportivo Quito | | | | 0–1 |
| LDU Quito | 3–1 | 1–1 | 1–0 | |

Source: LDU 1998
Legend: Blue = home team win; Yellow = draw; Red = away team win.

==== Finals ====
| Pos | Team | Pld | W | D | L | GF | GA | GD | Pts | Qualification |
|---|---|---|---|---|---|---|---|---|---|---|
| 1 | LDU Quito | 2 | 1 | 0 | 1 | 7 | 1 | +6 | 3 | Champions (5th title) |
| 2 | Emelec | 2 | 1 | 0 | 1 | 1 | 7 | −6 | 3 | |

===== Results =====
| Home \ Away | CSE | LDU |
|---|---|---|
| Emelec | | 1–0 |
| LDU Quito | 7–0 | |

Source: LDU 1998
Legend: Blue = home team win; Yellow = draw; Red = away team win.

| December 23 | Emelec | 1–0 | LDU Quito | Guayaquil |
| 20:00 UTC−05:00 | Kaviedes (?) | | | Stadium: Estadio George Capwell |

| December 27 | LDU Quito | 7–0 | Emelec | Quito |
| 11:30 UTC−05:00 | de la Cruz (?); Caicedo (?); Hurtado (?); Escobar (?) | | | Stadium: Estadio Casa Blanca |

=== Copa CONMEBOL ===
==== First round ====
| Pos | Team | Pld | W | D | L | GF | GA | GD | Pts | Qualification |
|---|---|---|---|---|---|---|---|---|---|---|
| 1 | LDU Quito (Ecuador) | 2 | 2 | 0 | 0 | 6 | 2 | +4 | 6 | Qualified to the Quarter-finals |
| 2 | Melgar (Peru) | 2 | 0 | 0 | 2 | 2 | 6 | −4 | 0 | |

===== Results =====
| Home \ Away | LDU | MEL |
|---|---|---|
| LDU Quito | | 3–1 |
| Melgar | 1–3 | |

Source: LDU 1998
Legend: Blue = home team win; Yellow = draw; Red = away team win.

| July 15 First Stage | Melgar | 1–3 | LDU Quito | Arequipa, Peru |
| | Sanjinez 17' | | Carcelén 4'; Morales 21'; Flavio Camargo 90' (pen.) | Stadium: Estadio Monumental Virgen de Chapi |

| July 21 First Stage | LDU Quito | 3–1 | Melgar | Quito, Ecuador |
| | Guevara 52'; Morales 60'; Flavio Camargo (?) | | Uehara 35' | Stadium: Estadio Casa Blanca |

==== Quarter-finals ====
| Pos | Team | Pld | W | D | L | GF | GA | GD | Pts | Qualification |
|---|---|---|---|---|---|---|---|---|---|---|
| 1 | Santos (Brazil) | 2 | 1 | 1 | 0 | 5 | 2 | +3 | 4 | Qualified to the Semi-finals |
| 2 | LDU Quito (Ecuador) | 2 | 0 | 1 | 1 | 2 | 5 | −3 | 1 | |

===== Results =====
| Home \ Away | LDU | SFC |
|---|---|---|
| LDU Quito | | 2–2 |
| Santos | 3–0 | |

Source: LDU 1998
Legend: Blue = home team win; Yellow = draw; Red = away team win.

| August 5 Quarterfinals | LDU Quito | 2–2 | Santos | Quito, Ecuador |
| | Morales (?) | | Jorginho (?); Lúcio (?) | Stadium: Estadio Casa Blanca |

| August 11 Quarterfinals | Santos | 3–0 | LDU Quito | Santos, Brazil |
| | Claudiomiro (?); Viola (?) | | | Stadium: Estádio Urbano Caldeira |
