= 2004 in Ecuadorian football =

Football in Ecuador
- Season: 2004

The 2004 season is the 82nd season of competitive football in Ecuador.

== National leagues ==
=== Serie A ===
- Champion: Deportivo Cuenca (1st title)
- International cup qualifiers:
  - 2005 Copa Libertadores: Deportivo Cuenca, Olmedo, LDU Quito
  - 2004 Copa Sudamericana: LDU Quito, Aucas
- Relegated: Macará, ESPOLI

=== Serie B ===
- Winner: Deportivo Quevedo (3rd title)
- Promoted: Deportivo Quevedo, LDU Loja
- Relegated: Deportivo Saquisilí, Audaz Octubrino

=== Segunda ===
- Winner: Tungurahua
- Promoted: Tungurahua, Esmeraldas Petrolero

== Clubs in international competitions ==
Team	2004 Copa Libertadores	2004 Copa Sudamericana
Aucas	N/A	Eliminated in the Preliminary Stage
Barcelona	Eliminated in the Round of 16	N/A
El Nacional	Eliminated in the First Stage	N/A
LDU Quito	Eliminated in the Round of 16	Eliminated in the Semifinals

== National teams ==
=== Senior team ===
==== 2006 FIFA World Cup qualifiers ====
Ecuador continued their 2006 FIFA World Cup qualifying in 2006.

2004-03-30
20:30

Argentina	1 – 0	Ecuador
Crespo 60'	(Report)

River Plate Stadium, Buenos Aires
Attendance: 55,000
Referee: Martín Vázquez (Uruguay)

2004-06-02
16:00

Ecuador	2 – 1	Colombia
Delgado 3'; Salas 66'	(Report)	Oviedo 57'

Estadio Olímpico Atahualpa, Quito
Attendance: 31,484
Referee: Héctor Baldassi (Argentina)

2004-06-05
16:00

Ecuador	3 – 2	Bolivia
Solíz 27' (o.g.); Delgado 32' de la Cruz 38'	(Report)	Gutiérrez 57'; Castillo 74'

Estadio Olímpico Atahualpa, Quito
Attendance: 30,020
Referee: Gustavo Brand (Venezuela)

2004-09-05
15:15

Uruguay	1 – 0	Ecuador
Bueno 57'	(Report)

Estadio Centenario, Montevideo
Attendance: 28,000
Referee: Gilberto Hidalgo (Peru)

2004-10-10
17:00

Ecuador	2 – 0	Chile
Kaviedes 49'; Méndez 64'	(Report)

Estadio Olímpico Atahualpa, Quito
Attendance: 27,956
Referee: René Ortubé (Bolivia)

2004-10-14
19:00

Venezuela	3 – 1	Ecuador
Urdaneta 20' (pen.); Morán 72' 80'	(Report)	M. Ayoví 41' (pen.)

Estadio Polideportivo de Pueblo Nuevo, San Cristóbal
Attendance: 13,800
Referee: Eduardo Lecca (Peru)

2004-11-17
16:00

Ecuador	1 – 0	Brazil
Méndez 77'	(Report)

Estadio Olímpico Atahualpa, Quito
Attendance: 38,308
Referee: Óscar Ruiz (Colombia)

==== Copa América ====
Ecuador was drawn into Group B with Argentina, Mexico, and Uruguay. They finished 4th in the group and were eliminated from the tournament.

Team	Pld	W	D	L	GF	GA	GD	Pts
Mexico	3	2	1	0	5	3	+2	7
Argentina	3	2	0	1	10	4	+6	6
Uruguay	3	1	1	1	6	7	−1	4
Ecuador	3	0	0	3	3	10	−7	0

July 7, 2004
19:45 (UTC-5)

Argentina	6 – 1	Ecuador
K. González 5' (pen.); Saviola 64', 75', 79'; D'Alessandro 84'; L. González 90'	Report	Delgado 62'

Estadio Elías Aguirre, Chiclayo
Referee: Carlos Amarilla (Paraguay)

July 10, 2004
17:30 (UTC-5)

Uruguay	2 – 1	Ecuador
Forlán 61'; Bueno 78'	Report	Salas 73'

Estadio Elías Aguirre, Chiclayo
Referee: Gustavo Brand (Venezuela)

July 13, 2004
17:30 (UTC-5)

Mexico	2 – 1	Ecuador
Altamirano 23' (pen.); Bautista 42'	Report	Delgado 71'

Estadio Miguel Grau, Piura
Referee: Eduardo Lecca (Peru)

==== Friendlies ====
2004-03-108

Mexico	2 – 1	Ecuador
Martínez 17' (pen.); Bravo 30'		Méndez 32' (pen.)

Estadio Víctor Manuel Reyna, Tuxtla
Attendance: 12,000
Referee: Batres (GUA)

2004-04-28

Honduras	1 – 1	Ecuador
Pavón 32'		Ordóñez 82'

Lockhart Stadium, Fort Lauderdale
Attendance: 15,000
Referee: Saheli (USA)

2004-10-20

Jordan	3 – 0	Ecuador
Al-Maltah 45+1'; Shelbayeh 53'; Suleiman 69'

June 11 Stadium, Tripoli
Attendance: —
Referee: —

2004-10-22

Nigeria	2 – 2	Ecuador
Ademola; Ezeji 78'		unknown Porozo 65'
Penalties
	3 – 4

June 11 Stadium, Tripoli
Attendance: —
Referee: —

2004-10-27

Mexico	2 – 1	Ecuador
Fonseca 42', 46'		Calle 80'

Giants Stadium, East Rutherford
Attendance: 12,000
Referee: Prus (USA)

== Notes ==
1. Ecuador fielded its U-23 team, but the match is listed as a full international by FIFA.
