= 2004 Campeonato Ecuatoriano de Fútbol Serie A =

Copa Pílsener Serie A
- Season: 2004
- Champions: Deportivo Cuenca (1st title)
- Relegated: Macará; ESPOLI
- Copa Libertadores: Deportivo Cuenca; Olmedo; LDU Quito
- Copa Sudamericana: Aucas; LDU Quito
- Top goalscorer: Ebelio Ordóñez (28 goals)

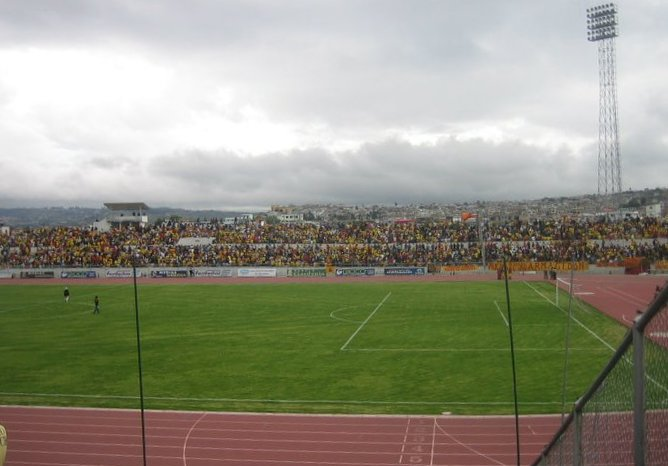
Sociedad Deportiva Aucas match in Ibarra

The 2004 Campeonato Ecuatoriano de Fútbol de la Serie A (known as the 2004 Copa Pílsener Serie A for sponsorship reasons) was the 47th season of the Serie A, the top level of professional football in Ecuador. Deportivo Cuenca won their first national championship.

== Format ==
The format for 2004 remained the same for this season.

The First Stage and Second Stage are identical. The ten teams competed in a double round-robin tournament, one game at home and one away. The top three teams in each stage qualified to the Liguilla Final with bonus points (2, 1, and .5 points, respectively). The First Stage winner and runner-up qualified to the 2004 Copa Sudamericana. At the end of the Second Stage, the two teams with the fewest points were relegated to the Serie B.

The Liguilla Final was a double round-robin tournament between the six qualified teams of the First and Second Stage. The winner of the Liguilla Final was crowned the Serie A champion. The champion and runner-up also qualified to the 2005 Copa Libertadores into the Second Stage, while the third-place finisher qualified to the First Stage.

== First stage ==
Pos	Team	Pld	W	D	L	GF	GA	GD	Pts	Qualification
1	Aucas	18	10	6	2	31	15	+16	36	2004 Copa Sudamericana Preliminary Phase and the Liguilla Final
2	LDU Quito	18	9	3	6	33	26	+7	30	2004 Copa Sudamericana Preliminary Phase and the Liguilla Final
3	Deportivo Cuenca	18	8	5	5	21	15	+6	29	Qualified to the Liguilla Final
4	Emelec	18	9	1	8	26	21	+5	28	
5	El Nacional	18	7	5	6	26	25	+1	26	
6	Deportivo Quito	18	7	4	7	28	32	−4	25	
7	Olmedo	18	6	6	6	23	23	0	24	
8	Barcelona	18	4	6	8	20	25	−5	18	
9	ESPOLI	18	3	8	7	14	23	−9	17	
10	Macará	18	2	6	10	16	33	−17	12	

Updated to match(es) played on May 23, 2004. Source: RSSSF
Rules for classification: 1) points; 2) goal difference; 3) number of goals scored.

== Second stage ==
Pos	Team	Pld	W	D	L	GF	GA	GD	Pts	Qualification
1	Barcelona	18	10	4	4	36	22	+14	34	Qualified to the Liguilla Final
2	Olmedo	18	8	7	3	34	25	+9	31	Qualified to the Liguilla Final
3	El Nacional	18	9	4	5	21	17	+4	31	Qualified to the Liguilla Final
4	Deportivo Quito	18	8	6	4	37	26	+11	30	
5	Deportivo Cuenca	18	8	4	6	24	21	+3	28	
6	Aucas	18	7	5	6	22	20	+2	26	
7	Emelec	18	5	7	6	27	33	−6	22	
8	LDU Quito	18	6	2	10	23	27	−4	20	
9	Macará	18	3	6	9	17	32	−15	15	
10	ESPOLI	18	2	3	13	15	33	−18	9	

Updated to match(es) played on October 3, 2004. Source: RSSSF
Rules for classification: 1) points; 2) goal difference; 3) number of goals scored.

== Aggregate table ==
Pos	Team	Pld	W	D	L	GF	GA	GD	Pts	Relegation
1	Aucas	36	17	11	8	53	35	+18	62	
2	Deportivo Cuenca	36	16	9	11	45	36	+9	57	
3	El Nacional	36	16	9	11	47	42	+5	57	
4	Olmedo	36	14	13	9	57	48	+9	55	
5	Deportivo Quito	36	15	10	11	65	58	+7	55	
6	Barcelona	36	14	10	12	56	47	+9	52	
7	LDU Quito	36	15	5	16	56	53	+3	50	
8	Emelec	36	14	8	14	53	54	−1	50	
9	Macará	36	5	12	19	33	65	−32	27	Relegation to Serie B
10	ESPOLI	36	5	11	20	29	56	−27	26	Relegation to Serie B

Updated to match(es) played on October 3, 2004. Source: RSSSF
Rules for classification: 1) points; 2) goal difference; 3) number of goals scored.

== Liguilla Final ==
Pos	Team	Pld	W	D	L	GF	GA	GD	BP	Pts	Qualification
1	Deportivo Cuenca (C)	10	6	1	3	16	13	+3	0.5	19.5	2005 Copa Libertadores Second Stage
2	Olmedo	10	6	0	4	16	14	+2	1	19	2005 Copa Libertadores Second Stage
3	LDU Quito	10	5	2	3	13	9	+4	1	18	2005 Copa Libertadores First Stage
4	El Nacional	10	4	3	3	17	16	+1	0.5	15.5	
5	Barcelona	10	3	2	5	14	16	−2	2	13	
6	Aucas	10	1	2	7	11	19	−8	2	7	

Updated to match(es) played on December 19, 2004. Source: RSSSF
Rules for classification: 1) points; 2) goal difference; 3) number of goals scored. Includes Bonus Points earned in the previous stages.
(C) Champions

Copa Pílsener Serie A
2004 champion

1st title
