= 1998 Campeonato Ecuatoriano de Fútbol Serie A =

Serie A
- Season: 1998
- Champions: LDU Quito (5th title)
- Relegated: Panamá; Técnico Universitario
- Copa Libertadores: Emelec; LDU Quito
- Matches played: 266
- Goals scored: 775 (2.91 per match)
- Top goalscorer: Iván Kaviedes (43 goals)
- Biggest home win: LDU Quito 7–0 Emelec (December 27)
- Highest scoring: Técnico Universitariao 3–5 Deportivo Quito (May 26)

The 1998 Campeonato Ecuatoriano de Fútbol de la Serie A was the 40th season of the Serie A, the top level of professional football in Ecuador. LDU Quito won their fifth national championship.

== Format ==
The format for 1998 is unique to this season in terms of competition format and awarding of points after results.

The season was divided into two tournaments, the Apertura and the Clausura, each with similar formats. The first phases of each tournament were different. For the Apertura, the twelves teams competed against each in a double round-robin format, once at home and once away. The top-four teams were put in Group 1 for the second phase, the next four were put into Group 2, and the bottom-four were put into Group 3. In the Clausura, the twelve teams were placed into two groups of six. Within this those groups, the teams competed against each other in a double round-robin format, once at home and once away. At the end, the top-two teams from each group were placed into Group 1, the middle-two teams from each group were placed into Group 2, and the bottom-two teams from each group were placed into Group 3.

The second phases of each tournament are identical. In each group, the four teams competed against each other in a double round-robin format for different objectives. Teams in Group 1 competed for a spot in the championship final and a berth in the 1999 Copa Libertadores. Teams in Group 2 competed for a spot in the 1999 Copa CONMEBOL playoff (to be played the following season). Teams in Group 3 competed to avoid relegation.

Relegation is determined at the end of the Clausura and would only involve teams who had played in either Group 3. Teams who played in Group 3 of either tournament earned negative points depending on their position at the end of group play. The two teams who had the most negative points were relegated to the Serie B for the next season.

The championship playoff was contested between the two winners of each tournament's Group 1 on a home and a way basis.

The points system was different for this season. If a game ended in a draw, each team would earn the normal one point. However, a penalty shootout will ensue at the end of regulation. The winner of the penalty shootout would earn an extra point.

== Torneo Apertura ==
=== First phase ===
Pos	Team	Pld	W	PKW	PKL	L	GF	GA	GD	Pts	Qualification
1	LDU Quito	22	11	5	1	5	40	27	+13	44	Qualifies to Group 1
2	Emelec	22	10	4	4	4	40	28	+12	42	Qualifies to Group 1
3	Aucas	22	9	5	3	5	32	22	+10	40	Qualifies to Group 1
4	Olmedo	22	8	5	4	5	28	24	+4	38	Qualifies to Group 1
5	ESPOLI	22	10	2	2	8	36	36	0	36	Qualifies to Group 2
6	Barcelona	22	8	3	4	7	39	29	+10	34	Qualifies to Group 2
7	Delfín	22	8	3	4	7	33	30	+3	34	Qualifies to Group 2
8	El Nacional	22	8	2	3	9	35	27	+8	31	Qualifies to Group 2
9	Deportivo Quito	22	6	3	6	7	34	36	−2	30	Qualifies to Group 3
10	Deportivo Cuenca	22	7	1	4	10	20	27	−7	27	Qualifies to Group 3
11	Técnico Universitario	22	5	4	1	12	26	47	−21	24	Qualifies to Group 3
12	Panamá	22	3	2	3	14	17	47	−30	16	Qualifies to Group 3

Source: RSSSF
Rules for classification: 1) points; 2) goal difference; 3) number of goals scored.

=== Second phase ===
==== Group 1 ====
Pos	Team	Pld	W	PKW	PKL	L	GF	GA	GD	Pts	Qualification
1	Emelec	6	5	0	0	1	12	5	+7	15	1999 Copa Libertadores and Championship playoff
2	LDU Quito	6	3	1	0	2	7	5	+2	11	
3	Aucas	6	3	0	0	3	7	6	+1	9	
4	Olmedo	6	0	0	1	5	2	12	−10	1	

Source: RSSSF
Rules for classification: 1) points; 2) goal difference; 3) number of goals scored.

==== Group 2 ====
Pos	Team	Pld	W	PKW	PKL	L	GF	GA	GD	Pts	Qualification
1	El Nacional	6	3	2	0	1	9	3	+6	13	Copa CONMEBOL playoff
2	Barcelona	6	3	0	2	1	9	5	+4	11	
3	ESPOLI	6	1	1	1	3	8	10	−2	6	
4	Delfín	6	2	0	0	4	5	13	−8	6	

Source: RSSSF
Rules for classification: 1) points; 2) goal difference; 3) number of goals scored.

==== Group 3 ====
Pos	Team	Pld	W	PKW	PKL	L	GF	GA	GD	Pts	RPts
1	Deportivo Quito	6	4	1	1	0	11	5	+6	15	−1
2	Técnico Universitario	6	2	1	0	3	8	9	−1	8	−2
3	Panamá	6	2	1	0	3	6	9	−3	8	−3
4	Deportivo Cuenca	6	1	0	2	3	5	7	−2	5	−4

Source: RSSSF
Rules for classification: 1) points; 2) goal difference; 3) number of goals scored.

== Torneo Clausura ==
=== First phase ===
==== Hexagonal 1 ====
Pos	Team	Pld	W	PKW	PKL	L	GF	GA	GD	Pts	Qualification
1	Deportivo Quito	10	6	0	2	2	23	14	+9	20	Qualifies to Group 1
2	Aucas	10	5	1	2	2	13	11	+2	19	Qualifies to Group 1
3	El Nacional	10	4	3	0	3	18	19	−1	18	Qualifies to Group 2
4	ESPOLI	10	4	0	2	4	21	15	+6	14	Qualifies to Group 2
5	Emelec	10	4	0	1	5	19	18	+1	13	Qualifies to Group 3
6	Panamá	10	0	3	0	7	9	26	−17	6	Qualifies to Group 3

Source: RSSSF
Rules for classification: 1) points; 2) goal difference; 3) number of goals scored.

==== Hexagonal 2 ====
Pos	Team	Pld	W	PKW	PKL	L	GF	GA	GD	Pts	Qualification
1	LDU Quito	10	6	3	0	1	18	5	+13	24	Qualifies to Group 1
2	Barcelona	10	6	1	1	2	17	7	+10	21	Qualifies to Group 1
3	Olmedo	10	3	2	0	5	14	19	−5	13	Qualifies to Group 2
4	Deportivo Cuenca	10	2	1	3	4	11	16	−5	11	Qualifies to Group 2
5	Técnico Universitario	10	1	3	3	3	10	17	−7	12	Qualifies to Group 3
6	Delfín	10	2	1	2	5	16	22	−6	10	Qualifies to Group 3

Source: RSSSF
Rules for classification: 1) points; 2) goal difference; 3) number of goals scored.

=== Second phase ===
==== Group 1 ====
Pos	Team	Pld	W	PKW	PKL	L	GF	GA	GD	Pts	Qualification
1	LDU Quito	6	3	0	2	1	9	6	+3	11	1999 Copa Libertadores and Championship playoff
2	Barcelona	6	2	2	0	2	9	6	+3	10	
3	Aucas	6	3	0	1	2	7	6	+1	10	
4	Deportivo Quito	6	1	1	0	4	3	10	−7	5	

Source: RSSSF
Rules for classification: 1) points; 2) goal difference; 3) number of goals scored.

==== Group 2 ====
Pos	Team	Pld	W	PKW	PKL	L	GF	GA	GD	Pts	Qualification
1	Deportivo Cuenca	6	5	0	0	1	12	2	+10	15	Copa CONMEBOL playoff
2	ESPOLI	6	3	0	1	2	13	8	+5	10	
3	Olmedo	6	0	3	0	3	2	12	−10	6	
4	El Nacional	6	1	0	2	3	6	11	−5	5	

Source: RSSSF
Rules for classification: 1) points; 2) goal difference; 3) number of goals scored.

==== Group 3 ====
Pos	Team	Pld	W	PKW	PKL	L	GF	GA	GD	Pts	RPts
1	Emelec	6	4	1	0	1	20	9	+11	14	−1
2	Técnico Universitario	6	3	0	0	3	11	12	−1	9	−2
3	Delfín	6	3	0	0	3	8	15	−7	9	−3
4	Panamá	6	1	0	1	4	9	12	−3	4	−4

Source: RSSSF
Rules for classification: 1) points; 2) goal difference; 3) number of goals scored.

== Relegation ==
Pos	Team	RPts	Qualification or relegation
1	Emelec	−1	
2	Deportivo Quito	−1	
3	Delfín	−3	
4	Deportivo Cuenca	−4 (Note: Deportivo Cuenca was saved from relegation by winning the Group 2 of the Clausura.)	
5	Técnico Universitario	−4	Relegated to the Serie B
6	Panamá	−7	Relegated to the Serie B

Source: RSSSF

== Championship playoff ==
December 23

Emelec	1 – 0	LDU Quito

Estadio George Capwell, Guayaquil

December 27

LDU Quito	7 – 0	Emelec
de la Cruz ?', ?', ?'; E. Hurtado ?', ?'; Caicedo ?' (o.g.); Escobar ?' (pen.)

Estadio Casa Blanca, Quito

Serie A
1998 champion
LDU Quito
5th title
