= Van Mourik =

Van Mourik is a Dutch toponymic surname meaning "from Maurik", a town in Gelderland. The variant Van Maurik retains the original spelling. People with this name include:

- Colin van Mourik (born 1985), Dutch football defender
- Ger van Mourik (1931–2017), Dutch football defender
- Guusje van Mourik (born 1955), Dutch karateka, judoka and boxer
- Justus van Maurik (1846–1904), Dutch author and cigar maker
