= Luis Miguel Garcés =

Ecuadorian footballer (born 1982)

Personal information
- Full name: Luis Miguel Garcés Prado
- Date of birth: August 12, 1982 (age 44)
- Place of birth: Machala, Ecuador
- Height: 1.68 m (5 ft 6 in)
- Position: Forward

Senior career*
Years	Team	Apps	(Gls)
2001–2004	Macará	111	(19)
2005	L.D.U. Quito	41	(6)
2006–2007	Macará	56	(14)
2008	Barcelona	5	(0)
2009	Macará	32	(9)
2010	Barcelona	24	(0)
2012	Fuerza Amarilla	6	(2)
2012	Mushuc Runa	10	(4)
2013	Macará	16	(1)
2013	Ferroviarios	12	(0)
2014	Fuerza Amarilla	13	(7)
2015	ESPOLI	3	(0)
2016	Anaconda FC	6	(1)
- * Club domestic league appearances and goals as of August 28, 2016

Luis Miguel Garcés (born August 12, 1982) is an Ecuadorian footballer.
