= 2003 in Ecuadorian football =

Football in Ecuador
- Season: 2003

The 2003 season is the 81st season of competitive football in Ecuador.

== National leagues ==
=== Serie A ===
- Champion: LDU Quito (7th title)
- International cup qualifiers:
  - 2004 Copa Libertadores: LDU Quito, Barcelona, El Nacional
  - 2004 Copa Sudamericana: LDU Quito, Barcelona
- Relegated: Técnico Universitario, Manta

=== Serie B ===
- Winner: Olmedo (2nd title)
- Promoted: Olmedo, Macará
- Relegated: Esmeraldas Petrolero, UDJ Quinindé

=== Segunda ===
- Winner: LDU Loja
- Promoted: LDU Loja, LDU Portoviejo

== Clubs in international competitions ==
Team	2003 Copa Libertadores	2003 Copa Sudamericana
Barcelona	Eliminated in the First Stage	Eliminated in the Preliminary Stage
El Nacional	Eliminated in the First Stage	N/A
Emelec	Eliminated in the First Stage	N/A
LDU Quito	N/A	Eliminated in the Preliminary Stage

== National teams ==
=== Senior team ===
The Ecuador national team played ten matches in 2003: four 2006 FIFA World Cup qualifiers, and six friendlies.

==== 2006 FIFA World Cup qualifiers ====
Qualification for the 2006 FIFA World Cup began in 2003.

2003-09-06
16:00

Ecuador	2 – 0	Venezuela
Espinoza 5'; Tenorio 72'	(Report)

Estadio Olímpico Atahualpa, Quito
Attendance: 14,997
Referee: Rubén Selman (Chile)

2003-09-10
20:45

Brazil	1 – 0	Ecuador
Ronaldinho 13'	(Report)

Vivaldão, Manaus
Attendance: 36,601
Referee: Luis Solórzano (Venezuela)

2003-11-15
19:20

Paraguay	2 – 1	Ecuador
Santa Cruz 29'; Cardozo 75'	(Report)	Méndez 58'

Estadio Defensores del Chaco, Asunción
Attendance: 12,000
Referee: Juan Carlos Paniagua (Bolivia)

2003-11-19
17:00

Ecuador	0 – 0	Peru
	(Report)

Estadio Olímpico Atahualpa, Quito
Attendance: 34,361
Referee: Epifanio González (Paraguay)

==== Friendlies ====
2003-02-09

Ecuador	1 – 0	Estonia
Hurtado 89' (pen.)

Estadio Modelo, Guayaquil
Attendance: 12,000
Referee: Pedro Ramos (Ecuador)

2003-02-12

Ecuador	2 – 1	Estonia
Baldeón 24', 48'		Zahovaiko 67'

Estadio Olímpico Atahualpa, Quito
Attendance: 3,000
Referee: Byron Moreno (Ecuador)

2003-04-30

Spain	4 – 0	Ecuador
de Pedro 15'; Morientes 21', 23', 64'

Estadio Vicente Calderón, Madrid
Attendance: 45,000
Referee: Sergo Kvaratskhelia (Georgia)

2003-06-08

Colombia	0 – 0	Ecuador

Estadio Vicente Calderón, Madrid
Attendance: 6,000
Referee: Antonio Rubinos (Spain)

2003-06-11

Peru	2 – 2	Ecuador
Silva 42'; Mendoza 52'		O. Tenorio 27', 74'

Giants Stadium, East Rutherford, New Jersey
Attendance: 4,500
Referee: Kevin Terry (United States)

2003-08-20

Ecuador	2 – 0	Guatemala
Baldeón 6'; Aguinaga 50'

Estadio Bellavista, Ambato
Attendance: 25,023
Referee: Segundo Díaz (Ecuador)
