= Colin van Mourik =

Dutch footballer

Personal information
- Date of birth: 22 November 1985 (age 40)
- Place of birth: Rhenen, Netherlands
- Height: 1.83 m (6 ft 0 in)
- Position: Defender

Youth career
- Candia '66
- 1999–2006: Vitesse

Senior career*
Years	Team	Apps	(Gls)
2006–2009	Vitesse	1	(0)
2009–2012	JVC Cuijk	46	(1)
2012–2016	SV Leones		
- * Club domestic league appearances and goals

Colin van Mourik (born 22 November 1985) is a Dutch former professional footballer who played as a defender.

== Football career ==
Born in Rhenen, Van Mourik joined the Vitesse youth academy in 1999 after having been scouted at his local club SV Candia '66. He made his first professional appearance – which would also prove to be his only – on 17 February 2007 in a 0–0 draw against Roda JC, where he also made his first start as the replacement of the suspended Paul Verhaegh. He was taken off in the 66th minute for Giovanny Espinoza.

In January 2009, his contract with Vitesse was terminated by mutual consent. He subsequently joined JVC Cuijk competing in the Hoofdklasse. In March 2012, it was announced that Van Mourik would sign with SV Leones in the Tweede Klasse, one of the lower divisions of the Dutch football league system, as he was not able to practice three times a week due to obligations with his job. He retired from football altogether after the 2015–16 season.
