= Alfonso Obregón =

Ecuadorian footballer (born 1972)

Personal information
- Full name: Alfonso Andrés Obregón Cancino
- Date of birth: May 12, 1972 (age 54)
- Place of birth: Portoviejo, Ecuador
- Height: 1.80 m (5 ft 11 in)
- Position: Midfielder

Senior career*
Years	Team	Apps	(Gls)
1994–1997	ESPOLI	87	(2)
1998–2000	LDU Quito	104	(2)
2001	Delfín	29	(7)
2002–2009	LDU Quito	227	(6)
Total		447	(17)

International career^{‡}
1995–2004	Ecuador	58	(0)
- * Club domestic league appearances and goals as of November 22, 2009 ‡ National team caps and goals as of July 10, 2004

Alfonso Andrés Obregón Cancino (born May 12, 1972) is a retired Ecuadorian football player.

== Club career ==
Obregón spent the majority of his professional career with LDU Quito. He has made over 300 appearances in the defensive midfield position and captained the team for a number of years before ceding the position to Patricio Urrutia. He won five Serie A titles and the 2008 Copa Libertadores with los albos.

== International career ==
At the international stage, Obregón earned 58 caps for the Ecuador national team between 1995 and 2004. His debut came on October 25, 1995, in a friendly against Bolivia. He would go on to form part of the squad that participated in the 2002 FIFA World Cup and played at the Copa América in 2001 and 2004. His last match came in the 2004 Copa América against Uruguay.

He currently serves as the sporting director for LDU Portoviejo in his hometown.

== Honors ==
LDU Quito

- Serie A: 1998, 1999, 2003, 2005 Apertura, 2007
- Copa Libertadores: 2008
