= Victor Ezeji =

Nigerian footballer

Personal information
- Date of birth: 9 June 1981 (age 45)
- Place of birth: Rivers State, Nigeria
- Height: 1.74 m (5 ft 8 1/2 in)
- Position: Striker

Senior career*
Years	Team	Apps	(Gls)
1996	Sharks F.C.		
1997–1999	Eagle Cement		
2000–2002	Sharks F.C.		
2003	Enyimba F.C.		
2004–2007	Dolphins F.C.		
2007–2008	Club Africain		
2008–2012	Sharks F.C.		
2013–2014	Enyimba FC		
2014–2015	Sunshine Stars FC		
2015–2015	Heartland FC		

International career
2004	Nigeria	3	(2)
- * Club domestic league appearances and goals as of 8 May 2014

Victor Ezeji (born 9 June 1981) is a Nigerian football striker who last played for Crown F.C. He is one of the most successful and longest-playing players in the Nigeria Football League . He won two Africa Champions League with Enyimba football club, Aba, Abia State, Nigeria.

== International ==
The striker played in eight international matches for the Super Eagles.
