= Juan Ángel Paredes =

Paraguayan footballer (born 1979)

Personal information
- Full name: Juan Ángel Paredes Cáceres
- Date of birth: 30 March 1979 (age 47)
- Place of birth: Asunción, Paraguay
- Height: 1.88 m (6 ft 2 in)
- Position: Striker

Youth career
- 1991–1996: Cerro Porteño

Senior career*
Years	Team	Apps	(Gls)
1996–1997	Cerro Porteño	17	(8)
1998–2003	Atlante	64	(15)
1999	→ América (loan)	17	(5)
1999–2000	→ Marte Morelos (loan)		
2003	→ Zacatepec (loan)		
2004	LDU Quito	16	(2)
2004	Olimpia	3	(1)
2005	Pioneros de Obregón	18	(6)
2005	Danubio	8	(2)
2006	12 de Octubre	37	(13)
2007	Palestino	9	(0)
2007	3 de Febrero	20	(2)
2008	The Strongest	4	(0)
2009	Sport Huancayo	30	(4)
2010	2 de Mayo		
2011	Sport Huancayo	7	(0)
2012	General Caballero ZC		
2013	Sport Colombia		

International career
1999	Paraguay U20		
2000	Paraguay U23	4	(1)

Managerial career
- 2023–2024: Sol de América (assistant)
- * Club domestic league appearances and goals

Juan Ángel Paredes Cáceres (born 30 March 1979) is a Paraguayan former professional football striker.

== Teams ==
- (Paraguay) Cerro Porteño 1996–1997
- (Mexico) Atlante 1998
- (Mexico) América 1999
- (Mexico) Marte Morelos 1999–2000
- (Mexico) Atlante 2001–2003
- (Mexico) Zacatepec 2003
- (Ecuador) LDU Quito 2004
- (Paraguay) Olimpia 2004
- (Uruguay) Danubio 2005
- (Paraguay) 12 de Octubre 2006
- (Chile) Palestino 2007
- (Paraguay) 3 de Febrero 2007
- (Bolivia) The Strongest 2008
- (Peru) Sport Huancayo 2009
- (Paraguay) 2 de Mayo 2010
- (Peru) Sport Huancayo 2011
- (Paraguay) General Caballero ZC 2012
- (Paraguay) Sport Colombia 2013
