= David Montoya (footballer, born 1978) =

Colombian footballer (born 1978)

Personal information
- Full name: David Fernando Montoya Vélez
- Date of birth: February 14, 1978 (age 48)
- Place of birth: Medellín, Colombia
- Height: 1.75 m (5 ft 9 in)
- Position: Midfielder

Team information
- Current team: Independiente Medellín

Youth career
- Envigado Fútbol Club

Senior career*
Years	Team	Apps	(Gls)
1999–2004	Independiente Medellín	151	(31)
2004	→ Club Zacatepec (loan)		(?)
2004	Liga de Quito	12	(2)
2005	Independiente Medellín	19	(3)
2005–2007	Independiente Santa Fe	69	(14)
2008	Deportivo Pasto	22	(2)
2009	Independiente Medellín	?	(?)
2010	Deportivo Lara	11	(2)

International career
2003	Colombia	4	(0)

Managerial career
- 2020-: Independiente Medellin (assistant)
- * Club domestic league appearances and goals

David Fernando Montoya Vélez (born February 14, 1978) is a Colombian former professional footballer who played as a midfielder.

== Club career ==
Montoya was part of Envigado's youth ranks, and gathered the attention of Independiente Medellín in 1999, making his professional debut that year.

He played the 2001 Finalizacion finals against América de Cali, where Medellin finished runner-up. The following year, Medellin won the 2002 Finalizacion title against Deportivo Pasto with Montoya being part of the squad.

In the 2003 Copa Libertadores, Montoya scored 4 goals, most notably the goal he scored at Estadio Atanasio Girardot to give his club the victory against powerhouse Boca Juniors.

For 2004, he played with LDU Quito, but was criticized for his poor form and returned the following year to Independiente Medellin.

From 2005 to 2007, he played with Independiente Santa Fe.

In 2010, he transferred to Venezuelan club Deportivo Lara, and retired after the 2010–11 Venezuelan Primera División season ended.

== International career ==
Montoya made four appearances for Colombia at the 2003 Gold Cup.

== Outside football ==
In 2013, Montoya returned to Independiente Medellin as coach of the youth academies. In 2020, he moved to the professional team as assistant coach, and has been interim manager of the club on several occasions.

== Honours ==
=== Independiente Medellin ===
- Categoria Primera A: 2002 Finalización
