= Sandro Coelho =

Brazilian footballer

Personal information
- Full name: Sandro Coelho Leite
- Date of birth: 27 June 1976 (age 50)
- Place of birth: Rio de Janeiro, Brazil
- Height: 1.87 m (6 ft 1 1/2 in)
- Position: Midfielder

Team information
- Current team: The Strongest

Youth career
- Botafogo

Senior career*
Years	Team	Apps	(Gls)
1995	América FC		
1996	Bahia		
1997–2006	The Strongest	247	(78)
2007–2008	→ San José (loan)	39	(7)
2009	The Strongest	15	(2)

Managerial career
- 2009–2010: The Strongest
- * Club domestic league appearances and goals as of 25 May 2009

Sandro Coelho Leite (born 27 June 1976 in Rio de Janeiro) is a retired Brazilian football midfielder who spent most of his career playing in the Bolivian Premier División for The Strongest.

== Career ==
Coelho developed his career at the youth ranks of Botafogo de Futebol e Regatas. He later played professionally for Brazilian clubs América Football Club in 1995, and Esporte Clube Bahia in 1996. The following year, Coelho arrived in La Paz to play for The Strongest. From the beginning he caused a good impression and the club decided to acquire his transfer. As his career progressed, Coelho became a key player for the team and a symbol for the club as he helped the institution obtain two national titles. During 2007 he added another title to his resume by winning the Clausura tournament with Club San José. After two years in Oruro, he return to his beloved The Strongest in 2009.

On 26 April 2009, during a league match against Blooming, Coelho became the club's all-time leading scorer in first division football. He scored 2 goals to reach a total of 80, surpassing former striker Ovidio Messa who previously led with 78. Moreover, he is the derby's (The Strongest vs. Bolívar) all-time topscorer with 10 goals.

On 1 June 2009, Coelho assumed the position of first team manager, after the resignation of Julio Toresani. His stint lasted until early 2010.

== Honours ==
=== Club ===
- The Strongest
  - Liga de Fútbol Profesional Boliviano: 2003 (A), 2003 (C), 2004 (C)
- San José
  - Liga de Fútbol Profesional Boliviano: 2007 (C)
