= Erwin Ramírez =

Ecuadorian footballer (born 1971)

Personal information
- Full name: Erwin Aníbal Ramirez Castro
- Date of birth: November 13, 1971 (age 54)
- Place of birth: Ecuador
- Position: Goalkeeper

Senior career*
Years	Team	Apps	(Gls)
1987	Audaz Octubrino		
1988	Deportivo Quevedo		
1989–1992	CA Green Cross		
1993	Emelec		
1994	Deportivo Quito		
1995	CA Green Cross		
1996	Técnico Universitario		
1997	ESPOLI		
2000–2002	Macará	52	(0)
2003–2004	LDU Quito	2	(0)
2005	Manta FC	36	(0)
2006	Delfín SC	13	(0)
2007	Municipal Cañar	10	(0)
2008	Brasilia	4	(0)
2008	San Camilo	12	(0)
2009	D. Colón	8	(0)

International career
1991	Ecuador	8	(1)
- * Club domestic league appearances and goals as of June 20, 2017

Erwin Aníbal Ramírez Castro (born November 13, 1971) is a retired football goalkeeper from Ecuador.

== International career ==
He obtained a total number of eight caps for the Ecuador national football team in 1991. In that year he played all matches for Ecuador, and scored a penalty kick against Bolivia (4-0) at the 1991 Copa América in Chile. Ramirez was also a member of the Ecuadorian youth squad at the 1987 FIFA U-16 World Championship.
