= 2003 Campeonato Ecuatoriano de Fútbol Serie A =

Copa Pílsener Serie A
- Season: 2003
- Champions: LDU Quito (7th title)
- Relegated: Técnico Universitario; Manta
- Copa Libertadores: LDU Quito; Barcelona; El Nacional
- Top goalscorer: Ariel Graziani (23 goals)

The 2003 Campeonato Ecuatoriano de Fútbol de la Serie A (known as the 2003 Copa Pílsener Serie A for sponsorship reasons) was the 46th season of the Serie A, the top level of professional football in Ecuador. LDU Quito won its seventh national championship.

== Format ==
The tournament for this season was composed of three stages:

The First Stage and Second Stages are identical. The ten teams competed in a double round-robin tournament, one game at home and one away. The top three teams in each stage qualified to the Liguilla Final with bonus points (3, 2, and 1 point[s], respectively). At the end of the Second Stage, the team with the fewest points in the aggregate table were relegated to the Serie B.

The Liguilla Final was a double round-robin tournament between the six qualified teams of the First and Second Stage. The winner of the Liguilla Final was crowned the Serie A champion. The champion, runner-up, and third-place finisher qualified to the 2004 Copa Libertadores.

== First stage ==
Pos	Team	Pld	W	D	L	GF	GA	GD	Pts	Qualification
1	Barcelona	18	12	2	4	41	19	+22	38	Qualified to the Liguilla Final
2	LDU Quito	18	10	6	2	37	24	+13	36	Qualified to the Liguilla Final
3	El Nacional	18	9	4	5	31	22	+9	31	Qualified to the Liguilla Final
4	Deportivo Quito	18	8	4	6	29	23	+6	28	
5	Emelec	18	6	8	4	26	31	−5	26	
6	Deportivo Cuenca	18	5	7	6	27	26	+1	22	
7	Aucas	18	6	4	8	24	26	−2	22	
8	Técnico Universitario	18	4	5	9	24	36	−12	17	
9	ESPOLI	18	4	3	11	25	37	−12	15	
10	Manta	18	3	3	12	17	37	−20	12	

Updated to match(es) played on June 22, 2003. Source: RSSSF
Rules for classification: 1) points; 2) goal difference; 3) number of goals scored.

== Second stage ==
Pos	Team	Pld	W	D	L	GF	GA	GD	Pts	Qualification
1	LDU Quito	18	10	4	4	31	15	+16	34	Qualified to the Liguilla Final
2	Barcelona	18	9	7	2	28	12	+16	34	Qualified to the Liguilla Final
3	El Nacional	18	9	5	4	38	18	+20	32	Qualified to the Liguilla Final
4	Deportivo Quito	18	10	2	6	27	23	+4	32	
5	Deportivo Cuenca	18	8	3	7	22	17	+5	27	
6	Emelec	18	8	3	7	29	26	+3	27	
7	ESPOLI	18	5	6	7	24	35	−11	21	
8	Aucas	18	5	3	10	21	29	−8	18	
9	Manta	18	3	5	10	16	38	−22	14	
10	Técnico Universitario	18	2	4	12	13	36	−23	10	

Updated to match(es) played on October 12, 2003. Source: RSSSF
Rules for classification: 1) points; 2) goal difference; 3) number of goals scored.

== Aggregate table ==
Pos	Team	Pld	W	D	L	GF	GA	GD	Pts	Qualification or relegation
1	Barcelona	36	21	9	6	69	31	+38	72	
2	LDU Quito	36	20	10	6	68	39	+29	70	
3	El Nacional	36	18	9	9	69	40	+29	63	
4	Deportivo Quito	36	18	6	12	56	46	+10	60	Qualified to the Liguilla Final (Note: Since Barcelona, LDU Quito, & El Nacional qualified to the Liguilla Final twice, Deportivo Quito, Emelec, and Deportivo Cuenca qualified to the Liguilla Final as the best non-top-three finisher in the aggregate table.)
5	Emelec	36	14	11	11	55	57	−2	53	Qualified to the Liguilla Final
6	Deportivo Cuenca	36	13	10	13	49	43	+6	49	Qualified to the Liguilla Final
7	Aucas	36	11	8	17	45	55	−10	41	
8	ESPOLI	36	9	8	19	49	72	−23	35	
9	Técnico Universitario	36	6	9	21	37	72	−35	27	Relegation to Serie B
10	Manta	36	6	8	22	33	75	−42	26	Relegation to Serie B

Updated to match(es) played on October 12, 2003. Source: RSSSF
Rules for classification: 1) points; 2) goal difference; 3) number of goals scored.

== Liguilla Final ==
Pos	Team	Pld	W	D	L	GF	GA	GD	BP	Pts	Qualification
1	LDU Quito (C)	10	7	0	3	19	13	+6	5	26	2004 Copa Libertadores group stage
2	Barcelona	10	6	0	4	19	9	+10	5	23	2004 Copa Libertadores group stage
3	El Nacional	10	6	0	4	21	13	+8	2	20	2004 Copa Libertadores group stage
4	Emelec	10	3	2	5	12	21	−9	0	11	
5	Deportivo Quito	10	3	1	6	11	19	−8	0	10	
6	Deportivo Cuenca	10	3	1	6	17	26	−9	0	10	

Updated to match(es) played on December 21, 2003. Source: RSSSF
Rules for classification: 1) points; 2) goal difference; 3) number of goals scored. Includes Bonus Points earned in the previous stages.
(C) Champions

Copa Pílsener Serie A
2003 champion
LDU Quito
7th title
