= 1998 in Ecuadorian football =

Football in Ecuador
- Season: 1998

The 1998 season was the 76th season of competitive football in Ecuador.

== National leagues ==
=== Serie A ===
- Champion: LDU Quito (5th title)
- International cup qualifiers:
  - 1999 Copa Libertadores: LDU Quito, Emelec
  - 1999 Copa CONMEBOL: Deportivo Cuenca
- Relegated: Técnico Universitario, Panamá

=== Serie B ===
- Winner: Macará (2nd title)
- Promoted: Macará, Audaz Octubrino
- Relegated: Green Cross, Calvi

=== Segunda ===
- Winner: Universidad Católica
- Promoted: Universidad Católica, Esmeraldas Petrolero

== Clubs in international competitions ==
Team	1998 Copa Libertadores	1998 Copa Merconorte	1998 Copa CONMEBOL
Barcelona	Runner-up	Eliminated in the First Round	N/A
Deportivo Cuenca	N/A	N/A	Eliminated in the Round of 16
Deportivo Quito	Eliminated in the First Round	N/A	N/A
El Nacional	N/A	Eliminated in the Semifinals	N/A
Emelec	N/A	Eliminated in the First Round	N/A

== National teams ==
=== Senior team ===
The Ecuador national team played just one match in 1998: a friendly against Brazil.

14 October 1998

Brazil	5 – 1	Ecuador
Marcelinho 20'; Élber 35', 70', 76'; Cafú 69'		de la Cruz 67'

RFK Stadium, Washington, D.C.
Attendance: 18,116
Referee: Brian Hall (United States)
