= Gustavo Figueroa =

United States-born Ecuadorian footballer (born 1978)

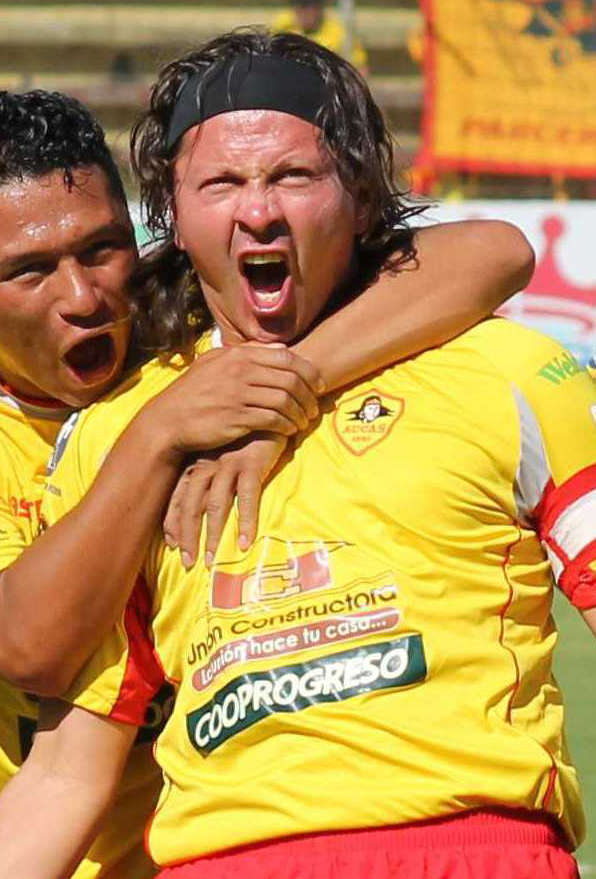

Personal information
- Full name: Gustavo Omar Figueroa Cáceres
- Date of birth: August 30, 1978 (age 48)
- Place of birth: Santa Ana, California, United States
- Height: 1.75 m (5 ft 9 in)
- Position: Striker

Senior career*
| Years | Team | Apps | (Gls) |
| 1998–1999 | LDU Quito | 12 | (0) |
| 2000 | Aucas | 43 | (9) |
| 2001 | LDU Quito | 17 | (3) |
| 2001–2002 | El Nacional | 32 | (4) |
| 2003–2004 | Aucas | 78 | (32) |
| 2005 | Sporting Cristal | 15 | (3) |
| 2005 | Emelec | 15 | (2) |
| 2006–2007 | El Nacional | 25 | (4) |
| 2007 | Aucas | 25 | (6) |
| 2008 | Deportivo Cuenca | 30 | (2) |
| 2009 | Macará | 24 | (1) |
| 2010 | Deportivo Azogues | 11 | (1) |
| 2011–2013 | Aucas | 106 | (42) |
| 2014 | Mushuc Runa | 7 | (0) |
| 2015 | UIDE | 13 | (4) |
| 2016 | JIT | 1 | (0) |
| 2017– | Aucas | 16 | (1) |

International career
| 2000–2006 | Ecuador | 5 | (0) |
- * Club domestic league appearances and goals as of July 21, 2017

Gustavo Omar Figueroa Cáceres (born August 30, 1978 in Santa Ana, California) is a United States-born, Ecuadorian former footballer who last played for Aucas.
