= Pavel Caicedo =

Ecuadorian footballer (born 1977)

Personal information
- Full name: Pavel Cipriano Caicedo Renteria
- Date of birth: June 15, 1977 (age 49)
- Place of birth: Guayaquil, Ecuador
- Position: Defender

Senior career*
Years	Team	Apps	(Gls)
1999–2004	Emelec	170	
2005–2009	El Nacional	143	
2010	Deportivo Quito	2	(0)
2010	El Nacional	0	(0)
2011	Barcelona	0	(0)
2012–2013	Macará		
- * Club domestic league appearances and goals

Pavel Cipriano Caicedo Renteria (born June 15, 1977) is an Ecuadorian football defender who most recently played for Macará.

== Club career ==
He was deemed surplus to requirements at Macará in May 2013.
