= Elkin Murillo =

Colombian footballer (born 1977)

Personal information
- Full name: Elkin Antonio Murillo Amor
- Date of birth: September 20, 1977 (age 49)
- Place of birth: Quibdó, Colombia
- Height: 1.75 m (5 ft 9 in)
- Position: Striker

Senior career*
Years	Team	Apps	(Gls)
1996–1999	Deportes Quindío	16	(1)
1999–2000	Independiente Medellín	84	(16)
2001–2003	Deportivo Cali	106	(22)
2004–2006	LDU Quito	96	(17)
2007–2008	Atlético Nacional	33	(2)
2008–2009	Sporting Cristal	15	(0)
2009	Técnico Universitario	26	(1)
2010	Deportes Quindío	31	(8)
2011	Deportes Tolima	17	(0)
2011	Deportivo Pereira	12	(2)
2012–2013	Cortuluá	30	(5)

International career
2001–2007	Colombia	28	(1)
- * Club domestic league appearances and goals as of November 5, 2012

Elkin Antonio Murillo Amor (born 20 September 1977) is a retired Colombian football striker.

Murillo made 28 appearances for the Colombia national football team, including two matches at the 2003 FIFA Confederations Cup. He also won the 2001 Copa América with Colombia's national team.
