= Luis Gómez (footballer, born 1972) =

Ecuadorian footballer (born 1972)

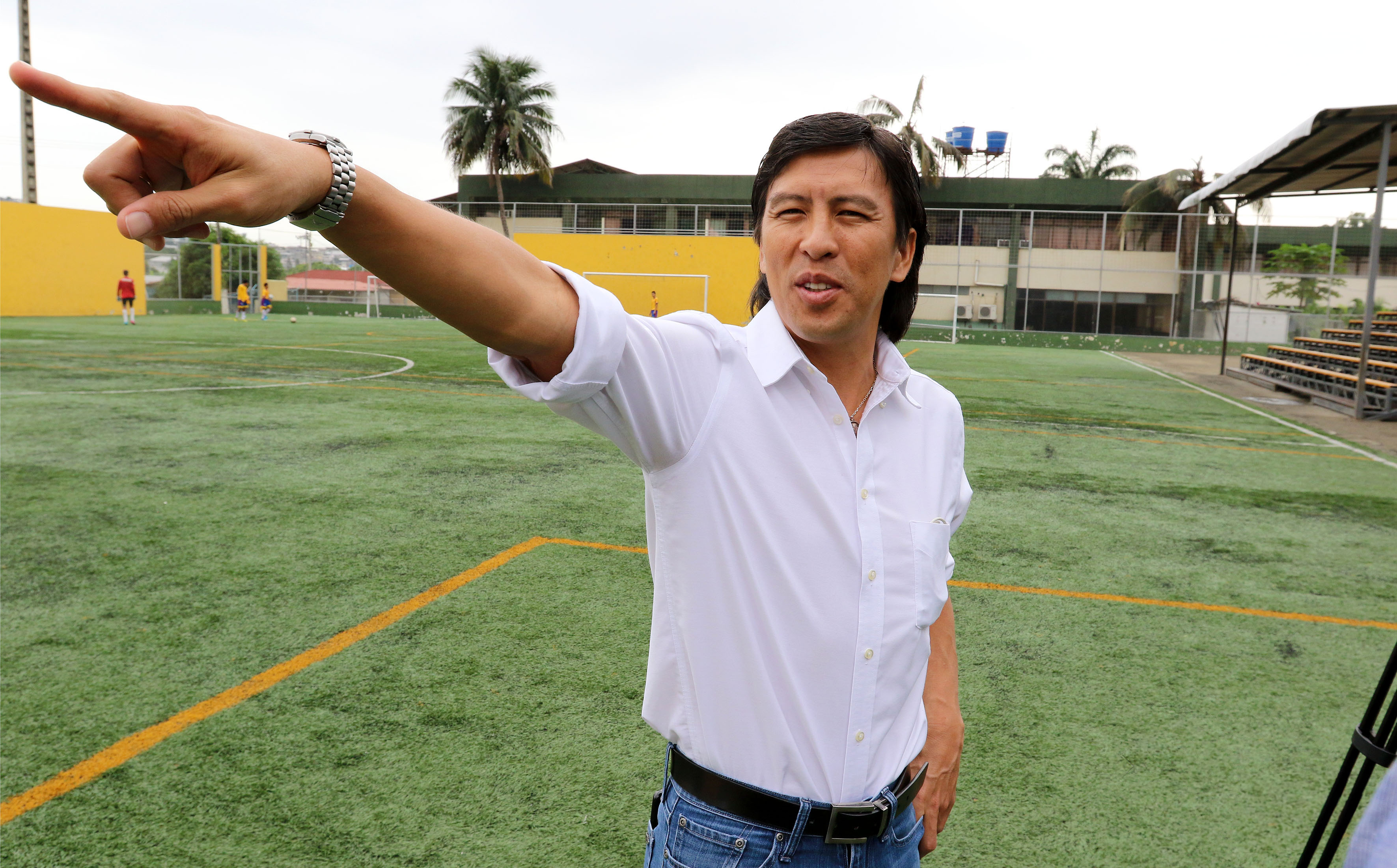

Personal information
- Full name: Luis Oswaldo Gómez Cáceres
- Date of birth: April 20, 1972 (age 54)
- Place of birth: Guayaquil, Ecuador
- Position: Defender

Senior career*
Years	Team	Apps	(Gls)
1992–2003	Barcelona	294	(38)
1994	→ Deportivo Quito (loan)	32	(3)
1999	→ Ferro Carril Oeste (loan)	3	(0)
2004–2005	L.D.U. Quito	49	(1)
2006	Universidad Católica	14	(2)
2007	Toreros F.C.	11	(5)
2008	Fedeguayas	6	(1)
Total		409	(50)

International career
1999–2003	Ecuador	13	(1)
- * Club domestic league appearances and goals

Luis Oswaldo Gómez Cáceres (born 20 April 1972 in Guayaquil), nicknamed "El Chino" (the Chinese) is an Ecuadorian former footballer.

== Club career ==
He played mostly for Barcelona Guayaquil, Deportivo Quito and for LDU Quito. In Argentina, he played in Ferro Carril Oeste.

== International career ==
He played for the Ecuador national football team and was a participant at the 2002 FIFA World Cup.
