= Marwin Pita =

Ecuadorian footballer (born 1985)

Personal information
- Full name: Marwin Jonathan Pita Mora
- Date of birth: 17 April 1985 (age 41)
- Place of birth: Portoviejo, Manabí Province, Ecuador
- Height: 1.74 m (5 ft 9 in)
- Position: Midfielder

Team information
- Current team: LDU Portoviejo
- Number: 10

Youth career
- 2001–2002: LDU Quito

Senior career*
Years	Team	Apps	(Gls)
2003–2007	LDU Quito	3	(0)
2005–2006	→ Macará (loan)	46	(20)
2007	Macará	25	(7)
2008–2014	El Nacional	261	(33)
2015–2016	Mushuc Runa	68	(8)
2017	Clan Juvenil	28	(1)
2019–	LDU Portoviejo		

International career
2011	Ecuador	1	(0)
- * Club domestic league appearances and goals as of 00:38, 29 May 2019 (UTC)

Marwin Jonathan Pita Mora (born April 17, 1985) is an Ecuadorian footballer currently playing for LDU Portoviejo. He plays as a striker for his team.

== Club career ==
Pita has played for many teams in Ecuador, including Macará, L.D.U. Quito, and El Nacional.

=== Liga de Quito ===
In his youth years he played for L.D.U. Quito. Although he came out of the youth ranks of LDUQ, he made no appearances for his team. Liga was not interested with Pita and as a result he was loaned out to Macará.

=== Macará ===
In 2005, Marwin was loaned out to Macará. For two years he stayed in Macará scoring goals. He was a key player and was having marvelous performances. In a game against Azogues, he had a hat-trick and was the best player of that game. He caught the eye of several Ecuadorian teams primarily Emelec and El Nacional. His hard work and talent gave him a good result during the end of his contract with Macará in the 2007 winter transfer window.

=== El Nacional ===
In the winter transfer window of 2008, Marwin was granted a loan move to El Nacional. He was used as a substitute during his first days with his new club. However, he became an important player for the club and is now a regular starter being used as a midfielder or a striker. He has been scoring goals for Nacional and is one of the best players of his team.

=== LDU Portoviejo ===
On 21 January 2019, Marwin joined LDU Portoviejo.
