= Panamá Sporting Club =

Ecuadorian football club

Panamá
- Full name: Panamá Sporting Club
- Nicknames: Los Panameños, Los Panaminos, Panamito, El Equipo Canalero
- Founded: June 23, 1923; 102 years ago
- Ground: Estadio Alejandro Ponce Noboa, Guayaquil, Ecuador
- Capacity: 4,000
- Chairman: Juan Carlos Tarré
- League: Segunda Categoría
- 2009: 5th
Home colours	Away colours

Panamá Sporting Club is an Ecuadorian football club based in Guayaquil. Founded in 1923, it plays in the Segunda Categoría. The club is named after the Panama Canal.

== Honors ==
Regional

- Guayaquil Championship (3): 1938, 1939, 1941

National

- Serie B (1): 1997
