= Jacinto Espinoza =

Ecuadorian footballer (born 1969)

Personal information
- Full name: Jacinto Alberto Espinoza Castillo
- Date of birth: November 24, 1969 (age 56)
- Place of birth: Bahía de Caráquez, Ecuador
- Height: 1.79 m (5 ft 10 in)
- Position: Goalkeeper

Senior career*
| Years | Team | Apps | (Gls) |
| 1988 | Eugenio Espejo | | |
| 1989–1990 | Filanbanco | 36 | (0) |
| 1991 | Valdez | 5 | (0) |
| 1992 | Emelec | 40 | (0) |
| 1993 | Alianza Lima | 15 | (0) |
| 1993 | Delfín | 6 | (0) |
| 1994–1996 | Emelec | 77 | (0) |
| 1997–2000 | LDU Quito | 152 | (0) |
| 2001 | ESPOLI | 45 | (0) |
| 2002 | Manta | 17 | (0) |
| 2002–2005 | LDU Quito | 123 | (0) |
| 2006–2007 | Macará | 69 | (0) |
| 2008 | Deportivo Azogues | 22 | (0) |
| 2009 | ESPOLI | 24 | (0) |
| 2010 | UT Cotopaxi | 4 | (0) |

International career
| 1992–2004 | Ecuador | 38 | (0) |
- * Club domestic league appearances and goals

Jacinto Alberto Espinoza Castillo (born November 24, 1969, in Bahía de Caráquez) is an Ecuadorian former football goalkeeper.

== Club career ==
He spent the majority of his professional career playing for a number of clubs in Ecuador, including powerhouses Emelec and LDU Quito, with whom he won national titles with. He played one season in Peru for Alianza Lima.

== International career ==
From 1992 to 2004, he was a number of the Ecuador national team amassing 38 caps.

== Honors ==
Emelec

- Serie A: 1994

LDU Quito

- Serie A: 1998, 1999, 2003, 2005 Apertura
