= Franklin Salas =

Ecuadorian footballer (born 1981)

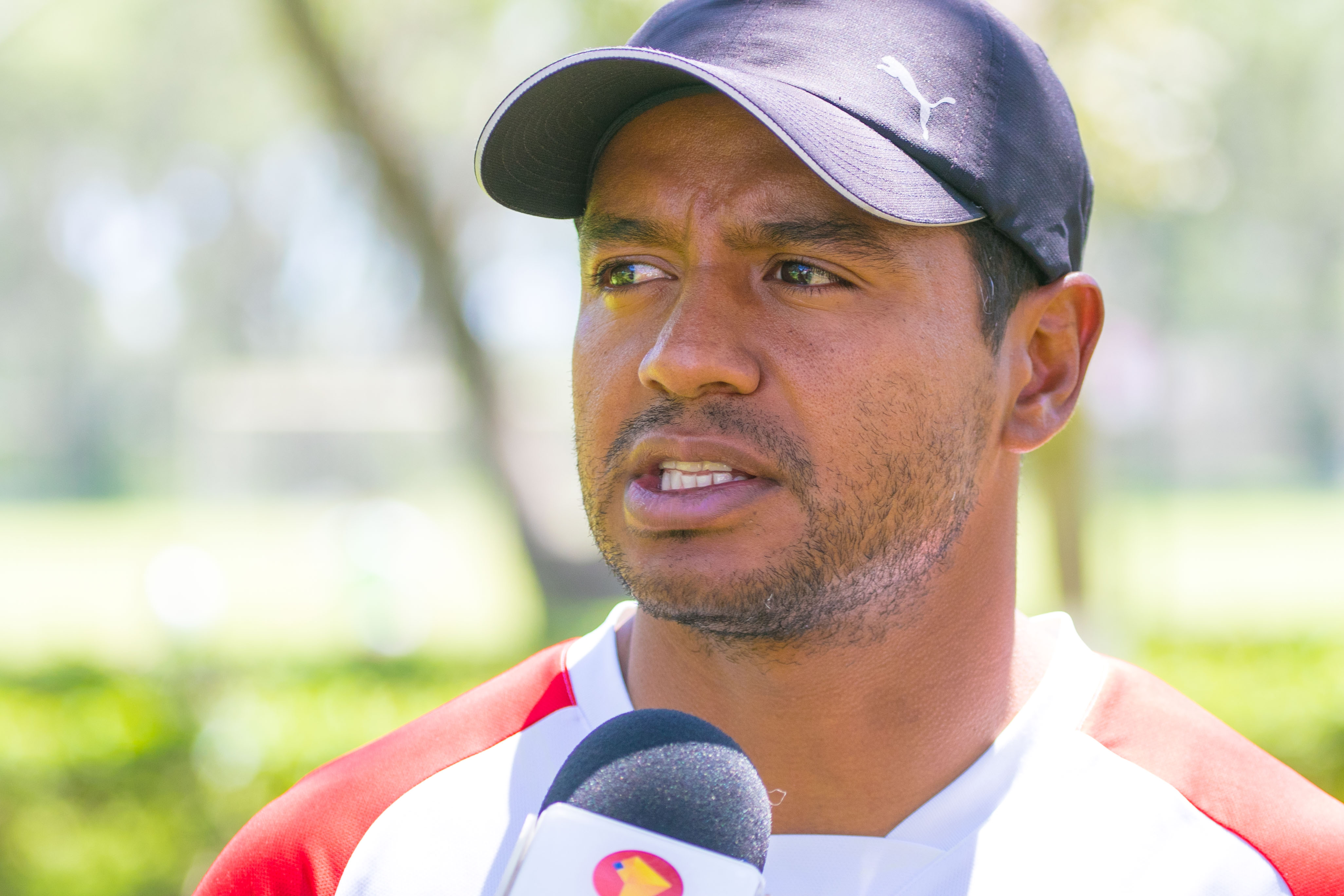
- Salas in April 2018

Personal information
- Full name: Franklin Agustín Salas Narváez
- Date of birth: 30 August 1981 (age 45)
- Place of birth: Santo Domingo, Ecuador
- Height: 1.67 m (5 ft 6 in)
- Positions: Forward; attacking midfielder

Youth career
- 1995–2001: LDU Quito

Senior career*
Years	Team	Apps	(Gls)
2000–2007	LDU Quito	187	(41)
2007–2008	Red Star Belgrade	4	(0)
2008–2010	LDU Quito	47	(7)
2011	→ Imbabura (loan)	19	(9)
2011	→ Godoy Cruz (loan)	2	(0)
2012	LDU Loja	28	(8)
2013–2014	Olmedo	26	(3)
2015	Deportivo Quito	26	(5)

International career
2000–2011	Ecuador	26	(2)

Managerial career
- 2017–2020: LDU Quito
- 2020-: Chacaritas FC
- * Club domestic league appearances and goals

Franklin Agustín Salas Narváez (born 30 August 1981) is an Ecuadorian former professional footballer who played as a forward.

His nickname is El Mago, meaning wizard or magician.

== Club career ==
Salas began his career in the youth ranks of LDU Quito, and in 2000 made his debut with the senior side. Noted for his skillful dribbling skills and his pace, his hard shot from 25 yards won the award for the goal of the tournament in the 2005 Copa Sudamericana. In late 2006, Salas had a trial with PSV Eindhoven, but Ronald Koeman did not offer him a contract.

On 16 July 2007, Salas was presented along with Argentine Hernán Barcos and Colombian Mauricio Molina, as the three new South American players for Red Star Belgrade, former European Cup champions. In 2008, Salas made a return to LDU Quito after a bad run with the Serbian club.

After half-a-year on loan at Imbabura, Salas joined Godoy Cruz in the Argentine Primera División.

== International career ==
Salas was called for the Ecuador national under-20 football team to play the 2001 FIFA World Youth Championship, where he made three substitutes appearances.

Subsequently, he was a regular member of the Ecuador national football team during the 2006 FIFA World Cup qualification phase, but was not called up to the World Cup squad due to a serious knee injury which required surgery. He scored the winning goal against Colombia in World Cup qualification on 2 June 2004.

Franklin was also voted as one of the 3 best players of the 2004 Copa América, along Robinho and Carlos Tevez.

== Honors ==
LDU Quito

- Ecuadorian Serie A: 2003, 2005 Apertura, 2010
- Ecuadorian Serie B: 2001
- Copa Libertadores: 2008
- Copa Sudamericana: 2009
- Recopa Sudamericana: 2009, 2010

Olmedo

- Ecuadorian Serie B: 2013
