= 2005 Copa Libertadores =

46th season of Copa Libertadores

2005 Copa Toyota Libertadores de América 2005 Copa Toyota Libertadores da América

Tournament details
- Dates: February 1 - July 14
- Teams: 38 (from 11 associations)

Final positions
- Champions: (Brazil) São Paulo (3rd title)
- Runners-up: (Brazil) Atlético Paranaense

Tournament statistics
- Matches played: 138
- Goals scored: 412 (2.99 per match)
- Top scorer: (Paraguay) Santiago Salcedo (9)

The 2005 Copa Libertadores was the 46th edition of the Copa Libertadores. The final was contested between two teams from Brazil. The champion also qualified for the 2005 FIFA Club World Championship.

It was the first time ever that two teams from the same country reached the final. This year's tournament was also the first Copa Libertadores to employ the away goals rule in knockout ties. São Paulo won the tournament, becoming the first Brazilian team to win the cup on three occasions.

== Preliminary round ==
12 teams from 11 football associations dispute 6 places in the Group Stage.

Team 1	Agg.	Team 2	1st leg	2nd leg
Mineros de Guayana (Venezuela)	1–5	(Colombia) América de Cali	0–2	1–3
Guadalajara (Mexico)	8–2	(Peru) Cienciano	3–1	5–1
Quilmes (Argentina)	2–2 (a)	(Chile) Colo-Colo	0–0	2–2
Tacuary (Paraguay)	2–4	(Brazil) Palmeiras	2–2	0–2
Junior (Colombia)	5–2	(Bolivia) Oriente Petrolero	2–1	3–1
LDU Quito (Ecuador)	4–4 (a)	(Uruguay) Peñarol	3–0	1–4

Team #1 was home in the first leg.

== Group stage ==
The six winners from the preliminary round join the other twenty-six teams in the group stage. The top 2 teams in each group advanced to the knockout stage.

Tiebreakers, if necessary, are applied in the following order:

1. Cumulative goal difference.
2. Total goals scored.
3. Away goals scored.
4. Sorting

=== Group 1 ===
Pos	Team	Pld	W	D	L	GF	GA	GD	Pts	DIM	CAP	AMC	LIB
1	(Colombia) Independiente Medellín	6	3	1	2	14	8	+6	10		2–2	2–0	4–2
2	(Brazil) Atlético Paranaense	6	3	1	2	8	11	−3	10	0–4		2–1	1–0
3	(Colombia) América de Cali	6	3	0	3	7	7	0	9	1–0	3–1		0–1
4	(Paraguay) Libertad	6	2	0	4	8	11	−3	6	3–2	1–2	1–2	

Legend: Blue = home team win; Yellow = draw; Red = away team win.

=== Group 2 ===
Pos	Team	Pld	W	D	L	GF	GA	GD	Pts	SAN	LDU	DAN	BOL
1	(Brazil) Santos	6	4	0	2	18	10	+8	12		3–1	3–2	6–0
2	(Ecuador) LDU Quito	6	2	2	2	7	10	−3	8	2–1		1–1	1–0
3	(Uruguay) Danubio	6	2	1	3	9	8	+1	7	1–2	3–0		2–0
4	(Bolivia) Bolívar	6	2	1	3	8	14	−6	7	4–3	2–2	2–0	

Legend: Blue = home team win; Yellow = draw; Red = away team win.

=== Group 3 ===
Pos	Team	Pld	W	D	L	GF	GA	GD	Pts	SAO	CHI	QUI	STR
1	(Brazil) São Paulo	6	3	3	0	16	9	+7	12		4–2	3–1	3–0
2	Universidad de Chile	6	2	3	1	9	9	0	9	1–1		3–2	2–1
3	(Argentina) Quilmes	6	1	2	3	8	11	−3	5	2–2	1–1		1–0
4	(Bolivia) The Strongest	6	1	2	3	6	10	−4	5	3–3	0–0	2–1	

Legend: Blue = home team win; Yellow = draw; Red = away team win.

=== Group 4 ===
Pos	Team	Pld	W	D	L	GF	GA	GD	Pts	CER	PAL	SAN	TAC
1	(Paraguay) Cerro Porteño	6	3	3	0	10	4	+6	12		1–1	1–0	3–1
2	(Brazil) Palmeiras	6	2	3	1	8	5	+3	9	0–0		1–1	3–0
3	(Brazil) Santo André	6	2	2	2	11	6	+5	8	2–2	2–1		6–0
4	(Venezuela) Deportivo Táchira	6	1	0	5	3	17	−14	3	0–3	1–2	1–0	

Legend: Blue = home team win; Yellow = draw; Red = away team win.

=== Group 5 ===
Pos	Team	Pld	W	D	L	GF	GA	GD	Pts	RIV	JUN	OLM	NAC
1	(Argentina) River Plate	6	5	1	0	12	5	+7	16		2–1	1–1	1–0
2	(Colombia) Junior	6	3	0	3	8	9	−1	9	0–2		2–0	3–2
3	(Ecuador) Olmedo	6	2	1	3	10	11	−1	7	2–3	3–1		2–3
4	(Uruguay) Nacional	6	1	0	5	7	12	−5	3	1–3	0–1	1–2	

Legend: Blue = home team win; Yellow = draw; Red = away team win.

=== Group 6 ===
Pos	Team	Pld	W	D	L	GF	GA	GD	Pts	UANL	BAN	ALI	CAR
1	(Mexico) UANL	6	3	3	0	13	5	+8	12		2–2	0–0	3–1
2	(Argentina) Banfield	6	3	2	1	10	9	+1	11	0–3		3–2	3–1
3	(Peru) Alianza Lima	6	1	2	3	4	7	−3	5	0–0	0–1		2–1
4	(Venezuela) Caracas	6	1	1	4	8	14	−6	4	2–5	1–1	2–0	

Legend: Blue = home team win; Yellow = draw; Red = away team win.

=== Group 7 ===
Pos	Team	Pld	W	D	L	GF	GA	GD	Pts	GUA	ONC	COB	SLA
1	(Mexico) Guadalajara	6	3	2	1	10	7	+3	11		0–0	3–1	2–1
2	(Colombia) Once Caldas	6	2	3	1	6	4	+2	9	4–2		0–0	0–0
3	(Chile) Cobreloa	6	2	2	2	6	7	−1	8	1–3	2–1		2–0
4	(Argentina) San Lorenzo	6	0	3	3	1	5	−4	3	0–0	0–1	0–0	

Legend: Blue = home team win; Yellow = draw; Red = away team win.

=== Group 8 ===
Pos	Team	Pld	W	D	L	GF	GA	GD	Pts	BOC	PAC	CRI	CUE
1	(Argentina) Boca Juniors	6	4	1	1	14	3	+11	13		4–0	3–0	3–0
2	(Mexico) Pachuca	6	3	1	2	8	9	−1	10	3–1		2–0	2–1
3	(Peru) Sporting Cristal	6	2	1	3	5	10	−5	7	0–3	2–0		1–0
4	(Ecuador) Deportivo Cuenca	6	0	3	3	4	9	−5	3	0–0	1–1	2–2	

Legend: Blue = home team win; Yellow = draw; Red = away team win.

== Knockout round ==
=== Qualified teams ===
The teams seeded 1 to 8 (first placed teams of each group) and 9 to 16 (second placed teams of each group) and the ties were 1 vs 16, 2 vs 15, etc.

Seed	Team	Pld	Pts	GD	Qualification
1	(Argentina) River Plate	6	16	+7	Qualified as first place
2	(Argentina) Boca Juniors	6	13	+11	Qualified as first place
3	(Brazil) Santos	6	12	+8	Qualified as first place
4	(Mexico) UANL	6	12	+8	Qualified as first place
5	(Brazil) São Paulo	6	12	+7	Qualified as first place
6	(Paraguay) Cerro Porteño	6	12	+6	Qualified as first place
7	(Mexico) Guadalajara	6	11	+3	Qualified as first place
8	(Colombia) Independiente Medellín	6	10	+6	Qualified as first place
9	(Argentina) Banfield	6	11	+1	Qualified as second place
10	(Mexico) Pachuca	6	10	-1	Qualified as second place
11	(Brazil) Atlético Paranaense	6	10	-3	Qualified as second place
12	(Brazil) Palmeiras	6	9	+3	Qualified as second place
13	(Colombia) Once Caldas	6	9	+2	Qualified as second place
14	Universidad de Chile	6	9	0	Qualified as second place
15	(Colombia) Junior	6	9	-1	Qualified as second place
16	(Ecuador) LDU Quito	6	8	-3	Qualified as second place

=== Bracket ===
First round
1	(Argentina) River Plate	1	4	5
16	(Ecuador) LDU Quito	2	2	4
8	(Colombia) I. Medellín	0	0	0
9	(Argentina) Banfield	3	2	5
5	(Brazil) São Paulo	1	2	3
12	(Brazil) Palmeiras	0	0	0
4	(Mexico) UANL	1	2	3
13	(Colombia) Once Caldas	1	1	2
6	(Paraguay) Cerro Porteño	1	2	3
11	(Brazil) A. Paranaense	2	1	3
3	(Brazil) Santos	1	3	4
14	U. de Chile	2	0	2
7	(Mexico) Guadalajara	1	3	4
10	(Mexico) Pachuca	1	1	2
2	(Argentina) Boca Juniors	3	4	7
15	(Colombia) Junior	3	0	3

Quarter-finals
1	(Argentina) River Plate	1	3	4
9	(Argentina) Banfield	1	2	3
5	(Brazil) São Paulo	4	1	5
4	(Mexico) UANL	0	2	2
11	(Brazil) A. Paranaense	3	2	5
3	(Brazil) Santos	2	0	2
7	(Mexico) Guadalajara	4	0	4
2	(Argentina) Boca Juniors	0	0	0

Semi-finals
1	(Argentina) River Plate	0	2	2
5	(Brazil) São Paulo	2	3	5
11	(Brazil) A. Paranaense	3	2	5
7	(Mexico) Guadalajara	0	2	2

Finals
5	(Brazil) São Paulo	1	4	5
11	(Brazil) A. Paranaense	1	0	1

=== Round of 16 ===
First leg matches were played between May 17, 2005, and May 19, 2005. Second leg matches were played between May 24, 2005, and May 26, 2005.

Team 1	Agg.	Team 2	1st leg	2nd leg
LDU Quito (Ecuador)	4-5	(Argentina) River Plate	2-1	2-4
Junior (Colombia)	3-7	(Argentina) Boca Juniors	3-3	0-4
Universidad de Chile	2-4	(Brazil) Santos	2-1	0-3
Once Caldas (Colombia)	2-3	(Mexico) UANL	1-1	1-2
Palmeiras (Brazil)	0-3	(Brazil) São Paulo	0-1	0-2
Atlético Paranaense (Brazil)	3-3 (5-4 pen)	(Paraguay) Cerro Porteño	2-1	1-2
Pachuca (Mexico)	2-4	(Mexico) Guadalajara	1-1	1-3
Banfield (Argentina)	5-0	(Colombia) Independiente Medellín	3-0	2-0

=== Quarterfinals ===
First leg matches were played on June 1, 2005, and June 2, 2005. Second leg matches were played between June 14, 2005, and June 16, 2005.

Team 1	Agg.	Team 2	1st leg	2nd leg
Banfield (Argentina)	3-4	(Argentina) River Plate	1-1	2-3
Guadalajara (Mexico)	4-0	(Argentina) Boca Juniors	4-0	0-0
Atlético Paranaense (Brazil)	5-2	(Brazil) Santos	3-2	2-0
São Paulo (Brazil)	5-2	(Mexico) UANL	4-0	1-2

=== Semifinals ===
First leg matches were played on June 22, 2005, and June 23, 2005. Second leg matches were played on June 29, 2005, and June 30,2024

Team 1	Agg.	Team 2	1st leg	2nd leg
São Paulo (Brazil)	5–2	(Argentina) River Plate	2–0	3–2
Atlético Paranaense (Brazil)	5–2	(Mexico) Guadalajara	3–0	2–2

=== Finals ===
First leg match was played on July 6, 2005. Second leg match was played on July 14, 2005.

Team 1	Agg.	Team 2	1st leg	2nd leg
Atlético Paranaense (Brazil)	1–5	(Brazil) São Paulo	1–1	0–4

Copa Libertadores de América
2005 champion

Third title

== Top goalscorers ==
9 goals

- Santiago Salcedo

6 goals

- Robinho
- Ricardinho
- Lima
- Omar Bravo
- Martín Palermo
- Daniel Bilos
- Martín Arzuaga
- Ernesto Farías

5 goals

- Rogério Ceni
- Luizão
- Deivid
- Rodrigão
- Francisco Palencia
- Andrés Guglielminpietro
