= Giovanny Espinoza =

Ecuadorian footballer (born 1977)

Personal information
- Full name: Giovanny Patricio Espinoza Pabón
- Date of birth: 12 April 1977 (age 49)
- Place of birth: Ibarra, Ecuador
- Height: 1.88 m (6 ft 2 in)
- Position: Centre-back

Team information
- Current team: Leones (assistant)

Youth career
- Aucas

Senior career*
Years	Team	Apps	(Gls)
1997–2001	Aucas	137	(3)
2001–2002	Monterrey	6	(0)
2002	Aucas	24	(3)
2003–2006	LDU Quito	144	(9)
2007–2008	Vitesse	27	(0)
2008–2009	Cruzeiro	25	(1)
2009	Barcelona SC	15	(0)
2009–2010	Birmingham City	0	(0)
2010–2011	Unión Española	32	(0)
2012–2013	Deportivo Quito	42	(0)
Total		452	(16)

International career
2000–2009	Ecuador	90	(3)

Managerial career
- 2024–2025: Leones (assistant)
- 2025: Leones
- 2026–: Leones (assistant)
- * Club domestic league appearances and goals

Giovanny Patricio Espinoza Pabón (born 12 April 1977) is an Ecuadorian football manager and former player who played as a centre-back. He is the current assistant manager of Leones.

== Club career ==
Espinoza's strong physique and speed helped his old club side LDU Quito win two league championships in 2001 and 2004. His nickname is La Sombra, which translates as "the shadow", because of his very dark skin color.

In the 2006 edition of the FIFA World Cup, Espinoza was nominated for a place in FIFA's ideal 11, which rewards the top players in each position.

On 25 January 2007, Giovanny Espinoza was transferred from LDU Quito to Vitesse. There he has to replace Ruud Knol. He signed for one-a-half-year until June 2008. On 10 February 2007, he made his Eredivisie debut for Vitesse against SC Heerenveen. The following match, he made his first appearance at home in a 0–0 draw against Roda JC, coming on as a substitute in the 66th minute for Colin van Mourik. The following season, he became a regular starter.

On 14 January 2008, Espinoza was signed by Brazilian club Cruzeiro. He captained of the side and showed some very impressive displays and leadership on the field. There were many rumors swirling around in late 2008, some had Espinoza signing with Argentinian struggling giants, River Plate and that unspecified English teams were also on the hunt for La Sombra. On 15 January 2009, it was confirmed that Espinoza would be playing for Barcelona Sporting Club and that his presence was asked by the head coach Benito Floro. His final club was Deportivo Quito.

=== Birmingham City ===
In June 2009, Espinoza's agent claimed that a fee had been agreed for the player to move to English Premier League club Birmingham City, and the parties were only awaiting final paperwork for the deal to be completed. The two-year deal was confirmed on 24 June 2009, where he will play alongside compatriot Christian Benítez. Espinoza was an unused substitute in the league game against Stoke City on 22 August 2009, and made his Birmingham debut three days later, playing the whole of the 2–1 second round League Cup win away against Southampton. On 12 January 2010 his contract with Birmingham was cancelled by mutual consent, having only made two League Cup appearances for the club.

=== Unión Española ===
In 2010, Giovanny Espinoza signed for Unión Española for a contract of three years.

=== Deportivo Quito ===
In January 2012, he signed a contract with Deportivo Quito for the 2012 season.

== International career ==
Espinoza was named in the Ecuador national side for the 2002 and 2006 FIFA World Cups. He currently is the seventh highest capped player for his country behind Luis Capurro with 100 caps. He made his international debut in 1996 just a week after his 19th birthday in a World Cup qualification match where Ecuador beat Peru 4–1.

Espinoza and Hurtado together hold the international record for the longest unbroken pairing in the position of centre half – they have played the last 65 games together, dating back to 1999. This is partly due to South American nations playing more international qualification matches than any other region. In the 2006 edition of the FIFA World Cup, Espinoza was nominated for a place in FIFA's ideal 11, which rewards the top players in each position. He was also included in Ecuador's squad for the 2001, 2004, and 2007 Copa América.

== Career statistics ==
=== International ===
Appearances and goals by national team and year
National team	Year	Apps	Goals
Ecuador	2000	5	0
Ecuador	2001	13	1
Ecuador	2002	3	0
Ecuador	2003	9	1
Ecuador	2004	12	0
Ecuador	2005	11	0
Ecuador	2006	10	0
Ecuador	2007	13	1
Ecuador	2008	8	0
Ecuador	2009	6	0
Total		90	3

Scores and results list Ecuador's goal tally first, score column indicates score after each Espinoza goal.

List of international goals scored by Giovanny Espinoza
No.	Date	Venue	Opponent	Score	Result	Competition
1	7 July 2000	Miami Orange Bowl, Miami, United States	Honduras	1–1	1–1	Friendly
2	6 September 2003	Atahualpa Olympic Stadium, Quito, Ecuador	Venezuela	1–0	2–0	2006 FIFA World Cup qualification
3	28 March 2007	Oakland Coliseum, Oakland, United States	Mexico	2–1	2–4	Friendly
