= Club Deportivo ESPOLI =

Ecuadorean football club

ESPOLI
- Full name: Club Deportivo ESPOLI
- Nicknames: El Equipo Policial (The Police Team); La Poli; El Gallito (The Little Rooster); La Chapita (The Badge); Los Gitanos (The Gypsies)
- Founded: February 5, 1986; 40 years ago
- Ground: Estadio Olímpico Municipal Etho Vega
- Capacity: 10,172
Home colours	Away colours

Club Deportivo ESPOLI is a professional football team from Quito, Ecuador, that now plays in the Segunda Categoría, the third level of professional football in country. The team belong to the Escuela Superior de Policía (ESPOLI), a police academy in Quito.

The closest the team has ever come to a national championship was in 1995, when they came in 2nd place in the national tournament to Barcelona. The result allowed them to participate in the 1996 Copa Libertadores, where they were eliminated in the Round of 16 by Corinthians.

== Stadium ==
Although based in Quito, the team will be chosen Estadio Olímpico Municipal Etho Vega in Santo Domingo for their home stadium. In the past, they have also hosted home game in Estadio Olímpico Atahualpa (1991–95 and 1995–01) and Estadio Chillogallo (2004) in Quito, Estadio Olímpico in Ibarra (1995 and 2002–04), Estadio Guillermo Albornoz in Cayambe (2005–07), and Estadio La Cocha in Latacunga (2007–09).

== Achievements ==
ESPOLI's original logo.

- Serie B (2): 1993, 2005 Apertura

=== Performance in CONMEBOL competitions ===
- Copa Libertadores: 1 participation (1996)

Best: Round of 16

== Current squad ==
As of March 1, 2016.

Note: Flags indicate national team as defined under FIFA eligibility rules; some limited exceptions apply. Players may hold more than one non-FIFA nationality.

No.	Pos.	Nation	Player
—	GK	ECU	Daniel Viveros
—	GK	ECU	Luis Vizcaino
—	DF	PAR	Víctor González
—	DF	ECU	Henry Medina
—	DF	ECU	Michael Castro
—	DF	ECU	Sandro Rojas
—	DF	ECU	David Mina
—	DF	ECU	Juan Nazareno
—	DF	ECU	Bryan Rivera
—	DF	ECU	Fulman Camacho
—	DF	ECU	César Velaña

No.	Pos.	Nation	Player
—	MF	ECU	Raúl Vargas
—	MF	ECU	Edgar Bravo
—	MF	ECU	William Araujo
—	MF	ECU	Diego Quintanilla
—	MF	ECU	Walter Molina
—	MF	ECU	Marco Ramos
—	MF	ECU	Luis Villacís
—	FW	ECU	Omar Andrade
—	FW	ECU	Jhon Chalá
—	FW	ECU	Fernando Lara
—	FW	ECU	Wilson Morales
