= 2008 Copa Libertadores Second Stage =

The Second Stage of the 2008 Copa Santander Libertadores was a group stage. It was played from February 12 to April 23.

== Format ==
Twenty-six teams qualified directly into this round, plus six that advanced from the First Stage. This brings the total number of teams in the Second Stage to 32. The teams were drawn into eight groups of four. The teams in each group will play each other in a double round-robin format, playing the other teams in the group once at home and once away. Teams will be awarded 3 points for a win, 1 point for a draw, and 0 points for a loss. The following criteria will be used for breaking ties on points:

1. Goal difference
2. Goals scored
3. Away goals
4. Draw

The top two teams from each group advance to the Round of 16.

== Groups ==
=== Group 1 ===
Pos	Team	Pld	W	D	L	GF	GA	GD	Pts	CRU	SLO	CAR	RPO
1	(Brazil) Cruzeiro	6	3	2	1	11	7	+4	11		3–1	3–0	3–0
2	(Argentina) San Lorenzo	6	3	1	2	8	7	+1	10	0–0		3–0	1–0
3	(Venezuela) Caracas	6	2	1	3	6	11	−5	7	1–1	2–0		2–1
4	(Bolivia) Real Potosí	6	2	0	4	11	11	0	6	5–1	2–3	3–1	

February 12, 2008
17:50 (UTC-4:30)

Caracas (Venezuela)	2–0	(Argentina) San Lorenzo
Vargas 39'; Castellín 70'	Report

Estadio Olímpico, Caracas
Attendance: 12,077
Referee: Alberto Duarte (Colombia)

February 13, 2008
21:50 (UTC-3)

Cruzeiro (Brazil)	3–0	(Bolivia) Real Potosí
Moreno Martins 46'; Ramires 52'; Guilherme 67'	Report

Estádio Governador Magalhães Pinto (Mineirão), Belo Horizonte
Attendance: 33,874
Referee: Roberto Silvera (Uruguay)

February 21, 2008
20:00 (UTC-3)

San Lorenzo (Argentina)	0–0	(Brazil) Cruzeiro
	Report

Estadio Pedro Bidegain (Nuevo Gasómetro), Buenos Aires
Attendance: 34,845
Referee: Carlos Amarilla (Paraguay)

February 26, 2008
18:50 (UTC-4:30)

Caracas (Venezuela)	2–1	(Bolivia) Real Potosí
Renteria 3'; Vargas 38'	Report	Galindo 74'

Estadio Olímpico, Caracas
Attendance: 12,426
Referee: José Buitrago (Colombia)

March 4, 2008
19:20 (UTC-3)

Cruzeiro (Brazil)	3–0	(Venezuela) Caracas
Guilherme 9'; Ramires 28'; Moreno Martins 63'	Report

Estádio Governador Magalhães Pinto (Mineirão), Belo Horizonte
Attendance: 37,694
Referee: Saúl Laverni (Argentina)

March 11, 2008
20:10 (UTC-4)

Real Potosí (Bolivia)	2–3	(Argentina) San Lorenzo
Loayza 17'; Pintos 32'	Report	Romeo 71'; Chávez 78'; Torres 88' (pen.)

Estadio Víctor Agustín Ugarte, Potosí
Attendance: 14,880
Referee: Jorge Larrionda (Uruguay)

March 18, 2008
21:20 (UTC-4:30)

Caracas (Venezuela)	1–1	(Brazil) Cruzeiro
Valencia 29'	Report	Moreno Martins 55' (pen.)

Estadio Olímpico, Caracas
Attendance: 15,837
Referee: Óscar Ruiz (Colombia)

March 25, 2008
19:00 (UTC-3)

San Lorenzo (Argentina)	1–0	(Bolivia) Real Potosí
González 29' (pen.)	Report

Estadio Pedro Bidegain (Nuevo Gasómetro), Buenos Aires
Attendance: 10,915
Referee: Heber Lopes (Brazil)

April 1, 2008
17:10 (UTC-4)

Real Potosí (Bolivia)	3–1	(Venezuela) Caracas
Candía 3'; Suárez 25'; Pintos 82'	Report	Castellín 6'

Estadio Víctor Agustín Ugarte, Potosí
Referee: Georges Bickley (Peru)

April 3, 2008
21:00 (UTC-3)

Cruzeiro (Brazil)	3–1	(Argentina) San Lorenzo
Moreno Martins 11', 71'; Wagner 83'	Report	Silvera 87'

Estádio Epaminondas Mendes Brito (Ipatingão), Ipatinga
Attendance: 15,843
Referee: Carlos Chandía (Chile)

April 16, 2008
18:30 (UTC-4)

Real Potosí (Bolivia)	5–1	(Brazil) Cruzeiro
Loayza 3'; Alvaro Pintos 13', 51'; Candia 67'; Ribeiro 86'	Report	Moreno Martins 29'

Estadio Víctor Agustín Ugarte, Potosí
Referee: Alfredo Intriago (Ecuador)

April 16, 2008
19:30 (UTC-3)

San Lorenzo (Argentina)	3–0	(Venezuela) Caracas
Bergessio 16'; Rosales 35' (o.g.); Silvera 79'	Report

Estadio Pedro Bidegain (Nuevo Gasómetro), Buenos Aires
Attendance: 21,906
Referee: Wilmar Roldán (Colombia)

=== Group 2 ===
Pos	Team	Pld	W	D	L	GF	GA	GD	Pts	ELP	LAN	CUE	DAN
1	(Argentina) Estudiantes	6	3	2	1	9	5	+4	11		0–0	2–0	2–0
2	(Argentina) Lanús	6	2	4	0	9	6	+3	10	3–3		0–0	3–1
3	(Ecuador) Deportivo Cuenca	6	1	3	2	2	5	−3	6	1–0	1–1		0–0
4	(Uruguay) Danubio	6	1	1	4	5	9	−4	4	1–2	1–2	2–0	

2008-02-12
19:40

Deportivo Cuenca (Ecuador)	1–0	(Argentina) Estudiantes
Ferradas 45'	(Report)

Estadio Alejandro Serrano Aguilar, Cuenca
Attendance: 18,527
Referee: Selman (Chile)

2008-02-14
21:50

Lanús (Argentina)	3–1	(Uruguay) Danubio
Pelletieri 8'; Acosta 58'; Sand 87'	(Report)	Abelenda 37'

Estadio Néstor Díaz Pérez, Lanús
Attendance: 20,000
Referee: Galeano (Paraguay)

2008-02-21
19:20

Deportivo Cuenca (Ecuador)	0–0	(Uruguay) Danubio
	(Report)

Estadio Alejandro Serrano Aguilar, Cuenca
Attendance: 12,000
Referee: Buckley (Peru)

2008-02-26
19:00

Estudiantes (Argentina)	0–0	(Argentina) Lanús
	(Report)

Estadio Único Ciudad de La Plata, La Plata
Attendance: 28,072
Referee: Favale (Argentina)

2008-03-05
20:30

Danubio (Uruguay)	1–2	(Argentina) Estudiantes
Irala 8'	(Report)	Verón 61'; Pérez 87'

Estadio Centenario, Montevideo
Attendance: 20,000
Referee: Osses (Chile)

2008-03-13
21:10

Lanús (Argentina)	0–0	(Ecuador) Deportivo Cuenca
	(Report)

Estadio Néstor Díaz Pérez, Lanús
Attendance: 20,500
Referee: Osses (Chile)

2008-03-18
20:30

Estudiantes (Argentina)	2–0	(Uruguay) Danubio
Verón 43'; Desábato 75'	(Report)

Estadio Único Ciudad de La Plata, La Plata
Attendance: 25,000
Referee: Gaciba (Brazil)

2008-03-20
21:20

Deportivo Cuenca (Ecuador)	1–1	(Argentina) Lanús
García 70'	(Report)	Salomón 7'

Estadio Alejandro Serrano Aguilar, Cuenca
Attendance: 19,500

2008-03-27
18:30

Danubio (Uruguay)	2–0	(Ecuador) Deportivo Cuenca
Malrrechaufe 3'; Lembo 20'	(Report)

Parque Central, Montevideo

2008-04-02
19:30

Lanús (Argentina)	3–3	(Argentina) Estudiantes
Sand 10'; Valeri 16'; Acosta 78'	(Report)	Desabato 21'; Benítez 24'; Moreno y Fabianesi 61'

Estadio Néstor Díaz Pérez, Lanús
Attendance: 10,652

2008-04-15
21:10

Danubio (Uruguay)	1–2	(Argentina) Lanús
Bardaro 87'	(Report)	Blanco 53'; Sand 64'

Parque Central, Montevideo

2008-04-15
21:10

Estudiantes (Argentina)	2–0	(Ecuador) Deportivo Cuenca
Lázzaro 18'; Wila 84' (o.g.)	(Report)

Estadio Único Ciudad de La Plata, La Plata

=== Group 3 ===
Pos	Team	Pld	W	D	L	GF	GA	GD	Pts	ATS	BOC	CC	MBO
1	(Mexico) Atlas	6	3	2	1	11	6	+5	11		3–1	3–0	3–0
2	(Argentina) Boca Juniors	6	3	1	2	12	9	+3	10	3–0		4–3	3–0
3	(Chile) Colo-Colo	6	3	1	2	11	9	+2	10	1–1	2–0		2–0
4	(Venezuela) Unión Atlético Maracaibo	6	0	2	4	3	13	−10	2	1–1	1–1	1–3	

2008-02-20
19:30

Unión Atlético Maracaibo (Venezuela)	1–1	(Argentina) Boca Juniors
M. Mea Vitali 80'	(Report)	Battaglia 83'

Estadio José Pachencho Romero, Maracaibo
Attendance: 47,112
Referee: Carlos Torres (Paraguay)

2008-02-21
20:40

Atlas (Mexico)	3– 0	(Chile) Colo-Colo
Marioni 7'; Colotto 40'; Medina 68'	(Report)

Estadio Jalisco, Guadalajara
Attendance: 46,846
Referee: Federico Beligoy (Argentina)

2008-02-28
19:50

Unión Atlético Maracaibo (Venezuela)	1– 3	(Chile) Colo-Colo
Díaz 90'	(Report)	Fierro 47'; Biscayzacú 69'; Lancken 87' (o.g.)

Estadio José Pachencho Romero, Maracaibo
Attendance: 42,215
Referee: Samuel Haro (Ecuador)

2008-03-06
21:20

Boca Juniors (Argentina)	3– 0	(Mexico) Atlas
Palacio 32' 81'; Palermo 82'	(Report)

La Bombonera, Buenos Aires
Attendance: 42,000
Referee: Roberto Silvera (Uruguay)

2008-03-12
20:40

Atlas (Mexico)	3–0	(Venezuela) Unión Atlético Maracaibo
Flores 41'; Achucarro 61'; Marioni 67'	(Report)

Estadio Jalisco, Guadalajara
Attendance: 48,978
Referee: Carlos Vera (Ecuador)

2008-03-20
20:00

Colo-Colo (Chile)	2–0	(Argentina) Boca Juniors
Jorquera 2'; Biscayzacú 34'	(Report)

Estadio Monumental David Arellano, Santiago
Attendance: 45,000
Referee: Martín Vázquez (Uruguay)

2008-03-25
19:50

Unión Atlético Maracaibo (Venezuela)	1–1	(Mexico) Atlas
Figueroa 80' (pen.)	(Report)	Marioni 56' (pen.)

Estadio José Pachencho Romero, Maracaibo
Attendance: 42,005

2008-03-27
21:00

Boca Juniors (Argentina)	4–3	(Chile) Colo-Colo
Palermo 30'; Gracián 50'; Palacio 66'; Cardozo 89'	(Report)	Biscayzacú 25', 43'; Moya 90+2'

La Bombonera, Buenos Aires
Attendance: 50,000

2008-04-08
17:30

Atlas (Mexico)	3–1	(Argentina) Boca Juniors
Flores 21'; Marioni 58' 76'	(Report)	Battaglia 30'

Estadio Jalisco, Guadalajara
Attendance: 62,300

2008-04-10
19:10

Colo-Colo (Chile)	2–0	(Venezuela) Unión Atlético Maracaibo
Biscayzacú 47'; Barrios 51'	(Report)

Estadio Monumental David Arellano, Santiago
Attendance: 15,000

2008-04-22
20:10

Colo-Colo (Chile)	1–1	(Mexico) Atlas
Rojas 6'	(Report)	Colotto 66'

Estadio Monumental David Arellano, Santiago
Attendance: 20,000

2008-04-22
21:10

Boca Juniors (Argentina)	3–0	(Venezuela) Maracaibo
Paletta 10'; Dátolo 21'; Riquelme 74'	(Report)

La Bombonera, Buenos Aires
Attendance: 40,000

=== Group 4 ===
Pos	Team	Pld	W	D	L	GF	GA	GD	Pts	FLA	NAC	CIE	BSI
1	(Brazil) Flamengo	6	4	1	1	9	4	+5	13		2–0	2–1	2–0
2	(Uruguay) Nacional	6	4	0	2	9	5	+4	12	3–0		3–1	1–0
3	(Peru) Cienciano	6	2	1	3	5	9	−4	7	0–3	2–1		1–0
4	(Peru) Coronel Bolognesi	6	0	2	4	0	5	−5	2	0–0	0–1	0–0	

2008-02-13
18:50

Coronel Bolognesi (Peru)	0–0	(Brazil) Flamengo
	(Report)

Estadio Jorge Basadre, Tacna
Attendance: 9,756
Referee: Mauricio Reinoso (Ecuador)

2008-02-14
16:30

Cienciano (Peru)	2–1	(Uruguay) Nacional
Vasallo 54' 67'	(Report)	Victorino 88'

Estadio Garcilaso de la Vega, Cusco
Attendance: 26,000
Referee: Enrique Osses (Chile)

2008-02-19
17:00

Coronel Bolognesi (Peru)	0–1	(Uruguay) Nacional
	(Report)	Fornaroli 8'

Estadio Jorge Basadre, Tacna
Attendance: 6,000
Referee: Marco Rodríguez (Mexico)

2008-02-27
21:50

Flamengo (Brazil)	2–1	(Peru) Cienciano
Souza 38'; Marcinho 89'	(Report)	Vasallo 45'

Maracanã, Rio de Janeiro
Attendance: 37,802
Referee: Ricardo Grance (Paraguay)

2008-03-06
19:00

Nacional (Uruguay)	3–0	(Brazil) Flamengo
Morales 40' 66'; Fornaroli 68'	(Report)

Estadio Gran Parque Central, Montevideo
Attendance: 20,000
Referee: Pablo Pozo (Chile)

2008-03-11
16:50

Cienciano (Peru)	1–0	(Peru) Coronel Bolognesi
Solís 75'	(Report)

Estadio Garcilaso de la Vega, Cusco
Referee: Víctor Carrillo (Peru)

2008-03-19
21:50

Flamengo (Brazil)	2–0	(Uruguay) Nacional
Marcinho 25' 66'	(Report)

Maracanã, Rio de Janeiro
Attendance: 49,096
Referee: Carlos Amarilla (Paraguay)

2008-03-25
21:40

Coronel Bolognesi (Peru)	0–0	(Peru) Cienciano
	(Report)

Estadio Jorge Basadre, Tacna
Attendance: 6,000

2008-04-03
18:40

Nacional (Uruguay)	1–0	(Peru) Coronel Bolognesi
Barone 30'	(Report)

Estadio Gran Parque Central, Montevideo

2008-04-09
19:50

Cienciano (Peru)	0–3	(Brazil) Flamengo
	(Report)	Renato Augusto 57'; Toró 75'; Juan 90+3'

Estadio Garcilaso de la Vega, Cusco

2008-04-23
19:30

Flamengo (Brazil)	2–0	(Peru) Coronel Bolognesi
Bruno 82'; Obina 88'	(Report)

Maracanã, Rio de Janeiro

2008-04-23
19:30

Nacional (Uruguay)	3–1	(Peru) Cienciano
Ligüera 38'; Cardaccio 53'; Vera 90+3'	(Report)	Guevara 82'

Estadio Gran Parque Central, Montevideo

=== Group 5 ===
Pos	Team	Pld	W	D	L	GF	GA	GD	Pts	RIV	AME	UC	USM
1	(Argentina) River Plate	6	4	0	2	14	8	+6	12		2–1	2–0	5–0
2	(Mexico) América	6	3	0	3	10	10	0	9	4–3		2–1	3–1
3	(Chile) Universidad Católica	6	3	0	3	6	6	0	9	1–2	2–0		1–0
4	(Peru) Universidad San Martín	6	2	0	4	4	10	−6	6	2–0	1–0	0–1	

2008-02-13
16:30

U. San Martín (Peru)	2–0	(Argentina) River Plate
Ovelar 14'; José Luis Díaz 91'	(Report)

Estadio Monumental, Lima
Attendance: 14,641
Referee: Leonardo Gaciba (Brazil)

2008-02-20
21:10

América (Mexico)	2–1	(Chile) Universidad Católica
Cabañas 38'; Higuain 90'	(Report)	Bottinelli 70'

Estadio Azteca, Mexico City
Attendance: 40,755
Referee: Saúl Laverni (Argentina)

2008-02-26
21:40

U. San Martín (Peru)	0–1	(Chile) Universidad Católica
	(Report)	Bottinelli 30'

Estadio Monumental, Lima
Attendance: 12,197
Referee: René Ortubé (Bolivia)

2008-02-27
20:30

River Plate (Argentina)	2–1	(Mexico) América
Falcao 38'; Ortega 93'	(Report)	Cabañas 15'

Estadio Monumental, Buenos Aires
Attendance: 22,597
Referee: Rubén Selman (Chile)

2008-03-12
21:10

Universidad Católica (Chile)	1–2	(Argentina) River Plate
Gutiérrez 47'	(Report)	Abreu 43'; Rosales 88'

Estadio San Carlos de Apoquindo, Santiago
Attendance: 13,654
Referee: Wagner Tardelli (Brazil)

2008-03-13
19:30

América (Mexico)	3–1	(Peru) U. San Martín
Márquez 39'; Íñigo 47'; Cabañas 71'	(Report)	Silva 6'

Estadio Azteca, Mexico City
Attendance: 28,397
Referee: Carlos Amarilla (Paraguay)

2008-03-26
21:20

River Plate (Argentina)	2–0	(Chile) Universidad Católica
Falcao 1'; Abreu 73'	(Report)

Estadio Monumental, Buenos Aires
Attendance: 22,105

2008-03-26
21:40

U. San Martín (Peru)	1–0	(Mexico) América
Leguizamón 36'	(Report)

Estadio Monumental, Lima
Attendance: 13,800

2008-04-01
21:50

Universidad Católica (Chile)	1–0	(Peru) U. San Martín
Gutiérrez 89'	(Report)

Estadio San Carlos de Apoquindo, Santiago
Attendance: 9,500

2008-04-02
21:10

América (Mexico)	4–3	(Argentina) River Plate
Íñigo 52'; Esqueda 54'; Cervantes 61'; Cabañas 69'	(Report)	Archubi 6'; Cervantes 56' (o.g.); Abreu 63'

Estadio Azteca, Mexico City
Attendance: 94,997

2008-04-17
20:30

Universidad Católica (Chile)	2–0	(Mexico) América
Medel 52'; D. Bottinelli 90'	(Report)

Estadio San Carlos de Apoquindo, Santiago
Referee: Leonardo Gaciba (Brazil)

2008-04-17
21:30

River Plate (Argentina)	5–0	(Peru) U. San Martín
Abreu 14' 51' 91'; Falcao 27'; Ríos 82'	(Report)

Estadio Monumental, Buenos Aires
Attendance: 14,110
Referee: Óscar Ruiz

=== Group 6 ===
Pos	Team	Pld	W	D	L	GF	GA	GD	Pts	CUC	SFC	GDL	SJO
1	(Colombia) Cúcuta Deportivo	6	3	2	1	7	4	+3	11		0–0	1–0	0–0
2	(Brazil) Santos	6	3	1	2	13	6	+7	10	2–1		1–0	7–0
3	(Mexico) Guadalajara	6	3	0	3	8	5	+3	9	0–1	3–2		2–0
4	(Bolivia) San José	6	1	1	4	4	17	−13	4	2–4	2–1	0–3	

February 13, 2008
21:10 (UTC-5)

Cúcuta Deportivo (Colombia)	0–0	(Brazil) Santos
	Report

Estadio General Santander, Cúcuta
Attendance: 23,269
Referee: Víctor Rivera (Peru)

February 19, 2008
20:40 (UTC-6)

Guadalajara (Mexico)	2–0	(Bolivia) San José
Solís 27'; Santana 53' (pen.)	Report

Estadio Jalisco, Guadalajara
Attendance: 5,250
Referee: Alfredo Intriago (Ecuador)

February 28, 2008
21:40 (UTC-5)

Cúcuta Deportivo (Colombia)	0–0	(Bolivia) San José
	Report

Estadio General Santander, Cúcuta
Attendance: 12,524
Referee: Juan Soto (Venezuela)

March 4, 2008
21:50 (UTC-3)

Santos (Brazil)	1–0	(Mexico) Guadalajara
Molina 22'	Report

Estádio Urbano Caldeira (Vila Belmiro), Santos
Attendance: 7,083
Referee: Carlos Amarilla (Paraguay)

March 11, 2008
20:30 (UTC-6)

Guadalajara (Mexico)	0–1	(Colombia) Cúcuta Deportivo
	Report	Urbano 44'

Estadio Jalisco, Guadalajara
Attendance: 9487
Referee: Alfredo Intriago (Ecuador)

March 19, 2008
20:50 (UTC-4)

San José (Bolivia)	2–1	(Brazil) Santos
Cerruti 11'; García 62'	Report	Kléber Pereira 7'

Estadio Jesús Bermúdez, Oruro
Referee: Samuel Haro (Ecuador)

March 27, 2008
20:50 (UTC-5)

Cúcuta Deportivo (Colombia)	1–0	(Mexico) Guadalajara
Urbano 52'	Report

Estadio General Santander, Cúcuta
Referee: Óscar Maldonado (Bolivia)

April 1, 2008
20:30 (UTC-3)

Santos (Brazil)	7–0	(Bolivia) San José
Domingos 17'; Molina 22', 32', 63', 87'; Kléber Pereira 79'; Quiñónez 81'	Report

Estádio Urbano Caldeira (Vila Belmiro), Santos
Attendance: 8,340
Referee: Líber Prudente (Uruguay)

April 8, 2008
19:10 (UTC-4)

San José (Bolivia)	2–4	(Colombia) Cúcuta Deportivo
Cerruti 46'; Parada 77'	Report	Urbano 35', 38', 79'; Torres 53'

Estadio Jesús Bermúdez, Oruro
Referee: Ricardo Grance (Paraguay)

April 9, 2008
18:50 (UTC-6)

Guadalajara (Mexico)	3–2	(Brazil) Santos
Arellano 13'; Rodríguez 34'; Santana 47'	Report	Kléber Pereira 39'; Kléber 56'

Estadio Jalisco, Guadalajara
Referee: José Buitrago (Colombia)

April 16, 2008
20:50 (UTC-4)

San José (Bolivia)	0–3	(Mexico) Guadalajara
	Report	Ávila 30', 43'; Pineda 56'

Estadio Jesús Bermúdez, Oruro
Referee: Pablo Pozo (Chile)

April 16, 2008
21:50 (UTC-3)

Santos (Brazil)	2–1	(Colombia) Cúcuta Deportivo
Kléber Pereira 68'; Trípodi 88'	Report	Henry 22'

Estádio Urbano Caldeira (Vila Belmiro), Santos
Referee: Jorge Larrionda (Uruguay)

=== Group 7 ===
Pos	Team	Pld	W	D	L	GF	GA	GD	Pts	SAO	AN	LUQ	AUD
1	(Brazil) São Paulo	6	3	2	1	6	4	+2	11		1–0	1–0	2–1
2	(Colombia) Atlético Nacional	6	2	2	2	8	5	+3	8	1–1		3–0	1–1
3	(Paraguay) Sportivo Luqueño	6	2	1	3	8	10	−2	7	1–1	1–3		4–1
4	(Chile) Audax Italiano	6	2	1	3	6	9	−3	7	1–0	1–0	1–2	

February 19, 2008
21:20 (UTC-4)

Audax Italiano (Chile)	1–2	(Paraguay) Sportivo Luqueño
Romero 10'	Report	Servín 8'; Núñez 71'

Estadio Monumental, Santiago
Attendance: 3,428
Referee: Heber Lopes (Brazil)

February 27, 2008
19:50 (UTC-5)

Atlético Nacional (Colombia)	1–1	(Brazil) São Paulo
Córdoba 8'	Report	Miranda 32'

Estadio Atanasio Girardot, Medellín
Attendance: 34,918
Referee: Víctor Hugo Rivera (Peru)

March 5, 2008
21:50 (UTC-3)

São Paulo (Brazil)	2–1	(Chile) Audax Italiano
Adriano 74', 84'	Report	Villanueva 61'

Estádio Cícero Pompeu de Toledo (Morumbí), São Paulo
Attendance: 29,047
Referee: Sergio Pezzotta (Argentina)

March 6, 2008
21:00 (UTC-5)

Atlético Nacional (Colombia)	3–0	(Paraguay) Sportivo Luqueño
Galvan Rey 21'; Villagra 43'; Valencia 81'	Report

Estadio Atanasio Girardot, Medellín
Attendance: 15,866
Referee: Jorge Larrionda (Uruguay)

March 18, 2008
21:50 (UTC-4)

Audax Italiano (Chile)	1–0	(Colombia) Atlético Nacional
Orellana 48'	Report

Estadio Monumental, Santiago
Referee: Fernando Cabrera (Uruguay)

March 20, 2008
17:40 (UTC-3)

Sportivo Luqueño (Paraguay)	1–1	(Brazil) São Paulo
Duarte 90+2'	Report	Aloísio 60'

Estadio Feliciano Cáceres, Luque
Attendance: 10,111
Referee: Sergio Pezzotta (Argentina)

April 2, 2008
21:50 (UTC-3)

São Paulo (Brazil)	1–0	(Paraguay) Sportivo Luqueño
Adriano 90+4'	Report

Estádio Cícero Pompeu de Toledo (Morumbí), São Paulo
Referee: Martín Vázquez (Uruguay)

April 3, 2008
21:20 (UTC-5)

Atlético Nacional (Colombia)	1–1	(Chile) Audax Italiano
Villagra 59'	Report	Orellana 78'

Estadio Atanasio Girardot, Medellín
Referee: Carlos Vera (Ecuador)

April 10, 2008
21:30 (UTC-3)

Sportivo Luqueño (Paraguay)	1–3	(Colombia) Atlético Nacional
Lazaga 71'	Report	Villagra 39'; Galvan Rey 51' (pen.); Córdoba 90'

Estadio Feliciano Cáceres, Luque
Attendance: 5,954
Referee: Saúl Laverni (Argentina)

April 10, 2008
21:30 (UTC-4)

Audax Italiano (Chile)	1–0	(Brazil) São Paulo
Ramos 78'	Report

Estadio Nacional, Santiago
Attendance: 2,454
Referee: Héctor Baldassi (Argentina)

April 23, 2008
20:50 (UTC-3)

Sportivo Luqueño (Paraguay)	4–1	(Chile) Audax Italiano
Abente 2', 28'; Gigena 8'; Esquivel 44'	Report	Villanueva 55'

Estadio Feliciano Cáceres, Luque
Referee: Roberto Silvera (Uruguay)

April 23, 2008
21:50 (UTC-3)

São Paulo (Brazil)	1–0	(Colombia) Atlético Nacional
Alex Silva 39'	Report

Estádio Cícero Pompeu de Toledo (Morumbí), São Paulo
Referee: Carlos Torres (Paraguay)

=== Group 8 ===
Pos	Team	Pld	W	D	L	GF	GA	GD	Pts	FLU	LDU	ARS	LIB
1	(Brazil) Fluminense	6	4	1	1	11	3	+8	13		1–0	6–0	2–0
2	(Ecuador) LDU Quito	6	3	1	2	10	5	+5	10	0–0		6–1	2–0
3	(Argentina) Arsenal	6	3	0	3	6	14	−8	9	2–0	0–1		1–0
4	(Paraguay) Libertad	6	1	0	5	5	10	−5	3	1–2	3–1	1–2	

February 20, 2008
19:40 (UTC-3)

Arsenal (Argentina)	1–0	(Paraguay) Libertad
Leguizamón 79'	Report

Estadio Julio H. Grondona, Sarandí
Attendance: 1,894
Referee: Sálvio Fagundes (Brazil)

February 20, 2008
19:50 (UTC-5)

LDU Quito (Ecuador)	0–0	(Brazil) Fluminense
	Report

Estadio Casa Blanca, Quito
Attendance: 12,144
Referee: Albert Duarte (Colombia)

March 4, 2008
17:20 (UTC-5)

LDU Quito (Ecuador)	2–0	(Paraguay) Libertad
Urrutia 71'; Guerrón 82'	Report

Estadio Casa Blanca, Quito
Attendance: 7,523
Referee: Óscar Ruiz (Colombia)

March 5, 2008
21:50 (UTC-3)

Fluminense (Brazil)	6–0	(Argentina) Arsenal
Thiago Neves 14'; Dodô 25', 50'; Gabriel 45'; Washington 72'; Cícero 86'	Report

Estádio Mario Filho (Maracanã), Rio de Janeiro
Attendance: 32,614
Referee: Carlos Torres (Paraguay)

March 12, 2008
19:10 (UTC-3)

Arsenal (Argentina)	0–1	(Ecuador) LDU Quito
	Report	Urrutia 79' (pen.)

Estadio Julio H. Grondona, Sarandí
Attendance: 1,586
Referee: Carlos Chandía (Chile)

March 19, 2008
18:30 (UTC-3)

Libertad (Paraguay)	1–2	(Brazil) Fluminense
Samudio 30'	Report	Washington 40', 50'

Estadio Defensores del Chaco, Asunción
Referee: Héctor Baldassi (Argentina)

March 26, 2008
17:00 (UTC-5)

LDU Quito (Ecuador)	6–1	(Argentina) Arsenal
Urrutia 15'; Manso 20'; Bolaños 29', 43'; Bieler 65'; Obregón 90'	Report	Leguizamón 4'

Estadio Casa Blanca, Quito
Attendance: 11,767
Referee: Armando Archundia (Mexico)

April 2, 2008
21:50 (UTC-3)

Fluminense (Brazil)	2–0	(Paraguay) Libertad
Cícero 30'; Silva 51'	Report

Estádio Mario Filho (Maracanã), Rio de Janeiro
Attendance: 33,551
Referee: Rubén Selman (Chile)

April 8, 2008
21:30 (UTC-3)

Libertad (Paraguay)	3–1	(Ecuador) LDU Quito
López 10'; Olivera 14'; Cuevas 65'	Report	Obregón 65'

Estadio Defensores del Chaco, Asunción
Referee: Jorge Larrionda (Uruguay)

April 8, 2008
21:10 (UTC-3)

Arsenal (Argentina)	2–0	(Brazil) Fluminense
Biagini 59'; Bottaro 65'	Report

Estadio Julio H. Grondona, Sarandí
Referee: Víctor Hugo Rivera (Peru)

April 17, 2008
18:10 (UTC-3)

Libertad (Paraguay)	1–2	(Argentina) Arsenal
Cuevas 23'	Report	Bottaro 10'; Yacuzzi 68'

Estadio Defensores del Chaco, Asunción
Attendance: 220
Referee: Óscar Maldonado (Bolivia)

April 17, 2008
19:10 (UTC-3)

Fluminense (Brazil)	1–0	(Ecuador) LDU Quito
Cícero 30'	Report

Estádio Mario Filho (Maracanã), Rio de Janeiro
Attendance: 19,269
Referee: Roberto Silvera (Uruguay)
