= 2007 Liga de Fútbol Profesional Boliviano =

Liga de Fútbol Profesional Boliviano
- Season: 2007
- Champions: Apertura:Real Potosi (1st title); Clausura: San José (2nd title)
- Relegated: Club Destroyers
- Copa Libertadores: La Paz F.C.; Real Potosí; San José
- Copa Sudamericana: Bolívar; Blooming
- Top goalscorer: Apertura: ___ (__ goals); Clausura: ___ (__ goals)

The 2007 season of Liga de Fútbol Profesional Boliviano was the 50th season of top-tier football in Bolivia. The 2007 annual season had the 35th (Apertura 2007) and the 36th (Clausura 2007) tournament of LFPB's history. The Apertura tournament started on March 6 and finished on June 13. The Clausura tournament was played between August and December. Bolívar and Wilstermann will be defending the championships obtained in the 2006 season.

== Teams and venues ==
Team	Location	Venue	Capacity
Aurora	Cochabamba	Estadio Felix Capriles	32,000
Blooming	Santa Cruz de la Sierra	Estadio Tahuichi Aguilera	38,000
Bolívar	La Paz	Estadio Libertador Simón Bolivar	25,000
Destroyers	Santa Cruz de la Sierra	Estadio Ramón Tahuichi Aguilera	38,000
Jorge Wilstermann	Cochabamba	Felix Capriles	32,000
La Paz	La Paz	Estadio Hernando Siles	42,000
Oriente Petrolero	Santa Cruz de la Sierra	Estadio Tahuichi Aguilera	38,000
Real Mamoré	Trinidad	Estadio Gran Mamoré	12,000
Real Potosí	Potosí	Estadio Victor Agustín Ugarte	32,000
San José	Oruro	Estadio Jesús Bermúdez	33,000
The Strongest	La Paz	Estadio Rafael Mendoza	15,000
Universitario de Sucre	Sucre	Estadio Olímpico Patria	32,000

== CONMEBOL qualification ==
Team	Competition
Apertura 2007 Champions	2008 Copa Libertadores 2008 as Bolivia-1
Clausura 2007 Champions	2008 Copa Libertadores 2008 as Bolivia-2
Playoff winners between Apertura 2007 and Clausura 2007 Runners-Up	2008 Copa Libertadores as Bolivia-3
Playoff losers between Apertura 2007 and Clausura 2007 Runners-Up	2008 Copa Sudamericana as Bolivia-1
Playoff winners between Apertura 2007 and Clausura 2007 3rd places	2008 Copa Sudamericana as Bolivia-2

=== Relegation ===
At the end of the year the team with the lowest point average (points / games played) from the past annual season (2006) and the current one (2007) is relegated to its respective regional tournament. The team with the 2nd lowest point average faces a playoff against the 2nd placed team in the Copa Simón Bolívar.

== Torneo Apertura ==
Twelve clubs play in double round-robin format (home and away), a total of 22 games each. A club receives 3 points for a win, 1 point for a tie, and 0 points for a loss. The clubs are ranked by points, and tie breakers are, in the following order: goal difference, goals scored, head-to-head results.

Pos	Team	Pld	W	D	L	GF	GA	GD	Pts	Qualification or relegation
1	Real Potosí	22	12	3	7	46	25	+21	39	Champions - Qualified for 2008 Copa Libertadores
2	Bolívar	22	10	4	8	32	37	−5	37 (Note: Bolívar awarded 3 points and Oriente 0 due to Oriente fielding ineligible players in their 3-0 win)	Qualified for 2008 Copa Sudamericana
3	La Paz	22	10	5	7	31	23	+8	35	Qualified for 2008 Copa Libertadores through Torneo Clausura and play-off de la Liga
4	Jorge Wilstermann	22	10	5	7	29	23	+6	35	
5	Oriente Petrolero	22	10	7	5	33	30	+3	34	
6	Blooming	22	10	1	11	32	35	−3	31	Qualified for 2008 Copa Sudamericana
7	The Strongest	22	8	5	9	36	40	−4	30 (Note: The Strongest awarded 2 points and San José 1 due to San Jose fielding ineligible players in their 2-2 draw)	
8	Aurora	22	8	4	10	37	34	+3	28	
9	San José	22	8	4	10	36	35	+1	27	Qualified for 2008 Copa Libertadores through Torneo Clausura and play-off de la Liga
10	Destroyers	22	7	5	10	28	35	−7	26	Relegated to Regional leagues
11	Universitario de Sucre	22	7	4	11	32	32	0	25	
12	Real Mamoré	22	7	3	12	32	55	−23	24	

Source: RSSSF
Notes:

Liga de Fútbol Profesional Boliviano
2007 Torneo Apertura champion

1st title

== Torneo Clausura ==
Top 3 teams qualify for the Final group. Winners of each group received a bonus point.

=== Group stage ===
==== Group 1 ====
Pos	Team	Pld	W	D	L	GF	GA	GD	Pts	Qualification
1	The Strongest	12	6	3	3	23	14	+9	21	Final Group
2	Blooming	12	6	3	3	14	10	+4	21	Final Group
3	San José	12	4	5	3	18	17	+1	17	Final Group
4	Universitario de Sucre	12	4	3	5	18	18	0	15	
5	Aurora	12	3	5	4	13	17	−4	14	
6	Destroyers	12	3	2	7	17	26	−9	11	

Source: RSSSF
Rules for classification: 1) points; 2) goal difference; 3) number of goals scored.

==== Group 2 ====
Pos	Team	Pld	W	D	L	GF	GA	GD	Pts	Qualification
1	La Paz	12	7	2	3	12	6	+6	23	Final Group
2	Jorge Wilstermann	12	5	3	4	19	17	+2	18	Final Group
3	Real Mamoré	12	5	2	5	15	13	+2	17	Final Group
4	Real Potosí	12	4	4	4	17	14	+3	16	
5	Bolívar	12	4	2	6	16	20	−4	14	
6	Oriente Petrolero	12	4	0	8	10	20	−10	12	

Source: RSSSF
Rules for classification: 1) points; 2) goal difference; 3) number of goals scored.

=== Final group ===
If two teams are tied on points, two legs will be played between those teams to determine the champion.

Pos	Team	Pld	W	D	L	GF	GA	GD	Pts
1	San José	10	5	3	2	16	13	+3	18
2	La Paz	10	5	2	3	18	16	+2	18
3	Blooming	10	4	3	3	15	11	+4	15
4	Real Mamoré	10	4	3	3	16	16	0	15
5	The Strongest	10	3	2	5	20	16	+4	12
6	Jorge Wilstermann	10	2	1	7	8	21	−13	7

Source: RSSSF

NB: La Paz FC and The Strongest started with 1 bonus point for winning their respective groups in the first phase

== Play-offs ==
=== Clausura Championship ===
9 December 2007 Leg 1	La Paz	2–2	San José	Estadio Hernando Siles, La Paz
	Daison Guale 69'; Ronald Gutiérrez 79'		Álex da Rosa 19'; Lisandro Moyano 90+2'

12 December 2007 Leg 2	San José	1–0 (3-2 agg.)	La Paz	Estadio Jesús Bermúdez, Oruro
	Álex da Rosa 32'

San Jose wins the title and qualifies to the Copa Libertadores

Liga de Fútbol Profesional Boliviano
2007 Torneo Clausura champion

3rd title

=== Libertadores playoff ===
This match was played to decide who would qualify for the Copa Libertadores.

16 December 2007 Leg 1	Bolívar	1–2	La Paz	Estadio Libertador Simón Bolivar, La Paz
	Luis Anibal Torrico 13'		Daison Guale 37'; Diomedes Peña 46'

19 December 2007 Leg 2	La Paz	2–1 (4-2 agg.)	Bolívar	Estadio Hernando Siles, La Paz
	Ronald Gutiérrez 74'; Diomedes Peña 82'		Doyle Vaca 63'

La Paz FC qualify to 2008 Copa Libertadores, losers Bolívar qualify to 2008 Copa Sudamericana

- Real Potosí and San José qualified to the 2008 Copa Libertadores Second Stage.
- La Paz qualified to the 2008 Copa Libertadores First Stage.
- Blooming qualified to the 2008 Copa Sudamericana First Stage.
- Bolívar qualified to the 2008 Copa Sudamericana Preliminary.

=== Promotion/relegation ===
6 December 2007 Leg 1	Aurora	3–0	Nacional Potosí	Estadio Félix Capriles, Cochabamba
	Edson Zenteno 12' (pen.); Oliver Christian Fernández 23'; Isidro Candia 90+3'

9 December 2007 Leg 2	Nacional Potosí	2–2 (2-5 agg.)	Aurora	Estadio Victor Agustín Ugarte, Potosí
	Fernando Batiste 25' (o.g.); Maximiliano Andrada 50'		Oliver Christian Fernández 1'; Isidro Candia 43'

Aurora wins 5-2 on aggregate and remains in the top division.
