= 2006–07 in Venezuelan football =

The following article presents a summary of the 2006-07 football season in Venezuela.

== Torneo Apertura ("Opening" Tournament) ==
Pos	Team	Points	Played	Won	Drawn	Lost	For	Against	Diff
1	Caracas F.C.	36	18	10	6	2	27	12	+15
2	U.A. Maracaibo	36	18	10	6	2	28	17	+11
3	Mineros de Guayana	27	18	7	6	5	27	24	+3
4	Deportivo Táchira F.C.	25	18	6	7	5	22	19	+3
5	Zamora F.C.	23	18	5	8	5	24	22	+2
6	Portuguesa F.C.	23	18	5	8	5	23	23	0
7	Carabobo F.C.	21	18	4	9	5	17	22	-5
8	Aragua F.C.	19	18	4	7	7	21	24	-3
9	Trujillanos F.C.	14	18	3	5	10	21	31	-10
10	Monagas S.C.	11	18	1	8	9	14	30	-16

=== Top scorers ===
Pos	Player	Team	Goals
1	Robinson Rentería (COL)	Trujillanos F.C.	11
2	Wilson Carpintero (COL)	Caracas F.C.	9
2	Juan Enrique García (VEN)	Mineros de Guayana	9
4	Brian Fuentes (ARG)	Zamora F.C.	7
5	Pedro Lucena (VEN)	Portuguesa F.C.	6

== Torneo Clausura ("Closing" Tournament) ==
Pos	Team	Points	Played	Won	Drawn	Lost	For	Against	Diff
1	U.A. Maracaibo	32	18	9	5	4	28	19	+9
2	Caracas F.C.	32	18	8	8	2	25	16	+9
3	Mineros de Guayana	27	18	7	6	5	26	24	+2
4	Zamora F.C.	26	18	7	5	6	24	16	+8
5	Carabobo F.C.	25	18	6	7	5	17	15	+2
6	Monagas S.C.	21	18	5	6	7	13	21	-8
7	Aragua F.C.	20	18	4	8	6	19	22	-3
8	Deportivo Táchira F.C.	19	18	3	10	5	22	25	-3
9	Portuguesa F.C.	19	18	5	4	9	19	26	-7
10	Trujillanos F.C.	17	18	4	5	9	20	27	-7

=== Top scorers ===
Pos	Player	Team	Goals
1	Alex Sinisterra (COL)	Zamora F.C.	11
2	Robinson Rentería (COL)	Trujillanos F.C.	8
3	Daniel Arismendi (VEN)	U.A. Maracaibo	6
3	Leonardo Rocha (BRA)	Portuguesa F.C.	6
3	Iván Velásquez (COL)	Caracas F.C.	6
3	Daniel Delfino (ARG)	Carabobo F.C.	6

== "Championship" playoff ==
Caracas F.C. and U.A. Maracaibo ended with one championship each at the end of the Apertura and Clausura. Tournament rules establish that a playoff game is required.

May 6, 2007

U.A. Maracaibo	0 – 1	Caracas F.C.
		Ronald Vargas 64'

Estadio José Pachencho Romero, Maracaibo
Attendance: 30 000
Referee: Giovanny Perluzzo

May 13, 2007

Caracas F.C.	0 – 0	U.A. Maracaibo

Estadio Brígido Iriarte, Caracas
Attendance: 12 000
Referee: Luis Márquez

Primera División Venezolana 2006-07 Winners

Caracas F.C.
9th Title

== Aggregate Table ==
Pos	Team	Points	Played	Won	Drawn	Lost	For	Against	Diff	Notes
1.	Caracas F.C.	68	36	18	14	4	52	28	+24	Copa Libertadores 2008
2.	U.A. Maracaibo	68	36	19	11	6	56	36	+20	Copa Libertadores 2008
3.	Mineros de Guayana	54	36	14	12	10	53	48	+5	Pre-Copa Libertadores
4.	Zamora F.C.	49	36	12	13	11	48	40	+8	Copa Sudamericana 2007
5.	Carabobo F.C.	46	36	10	16	10	34	37	-3	Copa Sudamericana 2007
6.	Deportivo Táchira F.C.	44	36	9	17	10	44	44	0	
7.	Portuguesa F.C.	42	36	10	12	14	42	49	-7	
8.	Aragua F.C.	39	36	8	15	13	40	46	-6	
9.	Monagas S.C.	32	36	6	14	16	27	51	-24	
10.	Trujillanos F.C.	31	36	7	10	19	41	58	-17	

== Venezuela national team ==
This section will cover Venezuela's games from August 16, 2006 until the end of the Copa América 2007.

Date	Venue	Opponents	Score	Comp	Venezuela scorers	Match Report(s)
August 16, 2006	Estadio Olímpico Hermanos Ghersi Páez; Maracay, Venezuela	Honduras	0 - 0	F		N/A
September 2, 2006	St. Jakob-Park; Basel, Switzerland	Switzerland	1 - 0	F		N/A
September 6, 2006	St. Jakob-Park; Basel, Switzerland	Austria	0 - 1	F	F. de Ornelas 9'	N/A
September 27, 2006	Estadio José Pachencho Romero; Maracaibo, Venezuela	Uruguay	1 - 0	F	D. Arismendi 81'	N/A
October 18, 2006	Centenario Stadium; Montevideo, Uruguay	Uruguay	4 - 0	F		CONMEBOL
November 15, 2006	Estadio Brígido Iriarte; Caracas, Venezuela	Guatemala	2 - 1	F	J. Villafraz 3'; J. M. Rey 52'	N/A
January 14, 2007	Estadio José Pachencho Romero; Maracaibo, Venezuela	Sweden	2 - 0	F	A. Guerra 17'; D. Arismendi 90'	N/A
February 7, 2007	Estadio José Pachencho Romero; Maracaibo, Venezuela	Chile	0 - 1	F	-	CONMEBOL
February 28, 2007	Balboa Stadium; San Diego, California, United States	Mexico	3 - 0	F	-	N/A
March 24, 2007	Estadio Metropolitano de Mérida; Mérida, Venezuela	Cuba	3 - 1	F	J. Arango 10'; J. Torrealba 35'; C. Gonzáles 64'	N/A
March 28, 2007	Estadio José Pachencho Romero; Maracaibo, Venezuela	New Zealand	5 - 0	F	R. D. Páez 8'; F. de Ornelas 31' 49'; Miku 85'; N. Rickey 90' (o.g.)	N/A
May 26, 2007	Estadio Metropolitano de Mérida; Mérida, Venezuela	Honduras	2 - 1	F	L. Vielma 18'; D. Arismendi 38'	CONMEBOL
June 1, 2007	Estadio José Pachencho Romero; Maracaibo, Venezuela	Canada	2 - 2	F	A. Cichero 22'; G. Maldonado 24'	CONMEBOL
June 20, 2007	Estadio Polideportivo de Pueblo Nuevo; San Cristóbal, Venezuela	(Basque Country (autonomous community)) Basque Country	3 - 4	F	J. Torrealba 27'; J. Arango 80' (pk) 86'	CONMEBOL
June 26, 2007	Estadio Polideportivo de Pueblo Nuevo; San Cristóbal, Venezuela	Bolivia	2 - 2	CA07	G. Maldonado 20'; R. D. Páez 55'	CONMEBOL
June 30, 2007	Estadio Polideportivo de Pueblo Nuevo; San Cristóbal, Venezuela	Peru	2 - 0	CA07	A. Cichero 49'; D. Arismendi 79'	CONMEBOL
July 3, 2007	Estadio Metropolitano de Mérida; Mérida, Venezuela	Uruguay	0 - 0	CA07	-	CONMEBOL
July 7, 2007	Estadio Polideportivo de Pueblo Nuevo; San Cristóbal, Venezuela	Uruguay	1 - 4	CA07	J. Arango 41'	CONMEBOL

KEY:

- F = Friendly match
- CA07 = Copa América 2007 match
