= Leonardo Abelenda =

Uruguayan football player (born 1986)

Personal information
- Full name: Leonardo Daniel Abelenda Rodríguez
- Date of birth: 10 February 1986 (age 40)
- Place of birth: Montevideo, Uruguay
- Height: 1.65 m (5 ft 5 in)
- Position: Defender

Team information
- Current team: Plaza Colonia
- Number: 8

Senior career*
Years	Team	Apps	(Gls)
2006–	Danubio	37	(3)
2008	→ Villa Española (loan)	14	(0)
2009	→ Rentistas (loan)		(0)
2010–2011	San Carlos	11	(0)
2011–	Plaza Colonia	10	(0)
- * Club domestic league appearances and goals as of 1 July 2012

Leonardo Daniel Abelenda Rodríguez (born 10 February 1986, in Montevideo) is a Uruguayan footballer currently playing for Plaza Colonia in the Uruguayan Segunda División.

He is well known for Danubio fans for scoring a wonderful free-kick goal in the 2008 Copa Libertadores against Lanús. He had a season abroad in the Costa Rican Primera División with San Carlos.

== Honours ==
Danubio

- Uruguayan League: 2006–07
