= 2008 Copa Libertadores knockout stage =

The last four stages of the 2008 Copa Santander Libertadores are the knockout stages: the Round of 16, the Quarterfinals, the Semifinals, and the Finals.

== Format ==
The remaining stages of the tournament constitute a single-elimination tournament. In each stage, the teams will play an opponent in a two-legged tie on a home-away basis. Each team will earn three points for a win, one point for a draw, and zero points for a loss. The team with the most points at the end of each tie will advance.

=== Tie-breaking ===
The following criteria will be used for breaking ties on points:

1. Higher position in group
2. Goal difference
3. Goals scored
4. Away goals
5. Penalty shoot-out

=== Seeding ===
The 16 qualified teams in the knockout round will be seeded according to their results in the group stage. The top teams from each group are seeded 1–8, with the team with the most points as seed 1 and the team with the least as seed 8. The second-best teams from each group are seeded 9–16, with the team with the most points as seed 9 and the team with the least as seed 16. Teams with a higher seed will play the second leg of each tie at home.

Teams qualified as a group winner
Seed	Team	Pts	GD	GF	AG
1	(Brazil) Fluminense	13	+8	11	2
2	(Brazil) Flamengo	13	+4	8	3
3	(Argentina) River Plate	12	+6	14	5
4	(Mexico) Atlas	11	+5	11	2
5	(Brazil) Cruzeiro	11	+4	11	2
6	(Argentina) Estudiantes	11	+4	9	5
7	(Colombia) Cúcuta Deportivo	11	+3	7	6
8	(Brazil) São Paulo	11	+2	6	2

Teams qualified as a runner-up
Seed	Team	Pts	GD	GF	AG
9	(Uruguay) Nacional	12	+4	9	2
10	(Brazil) Santos	10	+7	13	3
11	(Ecuador) LDU Quito	10	+5	10	2
12	(Argentina) Boca Juniors	10	+3	12	2
13	(Argentina) Lanús	10	+3	9	3
14	(Argentina) San Lorenzo	10	+1	8	4
15	(Mexico) América	9	0	10	1
16	(Colombia) Atlético Nacional	8	+3	8	3

== Bracket ==
Round of 16
1	(Brazil) Fluminense	2	1	3
16	(Colombia) Atlético Nacional	1	0	1
8	(Brazil) São Paulo	0	2	2
9	(Uruguay) Nacional	0	0	0
5	(Brazil) Cruzeiro	1	1	2
12	(Argentina) Boca Juniors	2	2	4
4	(Mexico) Atlas	1	2	3
13	(Argentina) Lanús	0	2	2
6	(Argentina) Estudiantes	0	2	2
11	(Ecuador) LDU Quito	2	1	3
3	(Argentina) River Plate	1	2	3
14	(Argentina) San Lorenzo	2	2	4
7	(Colombia) Cúcuta Deportivo	0	0	0
10	(Brazil) Santos	2	2	4
2	(Brazil) Flamengo	4	0	4
15	(Mexico) América	2	3	5

Quarterfinals
1	(Brazil) Fluminense	0	3	3
8	(Brazil) São Paulo	1	1	2
12	(Argentina) Boca Juniors	2	3	5
4	(Mexico) Atlas	2	0	2
11	(Ecuador) LDU Quito (p)	1	1	2 [5]
14	(Argentina) San Lorenzo	1	1	2 [3]
10	(Brazil) Santos	0	1	1
15	(Mexico) América	2	0	2

Semifinals
1	(Brazil) Fluminense	2	3	5
12	(Argentina) Boca Juniors	2	1	3
11	(Ecuador) LDU Quito (a)	1	0	1
15	(Mexico) América	1	0	1

Finals
1	(Brazil) Fluminense	2	3	5 [1]
11	(Ecuador) LDU Quito (p)	4	1	5 [3]

== Round of 16 ==
The Round of 16 was played between April 29 and 30, and May 1, 6, and 8. Team #1 played the second leg at home.

Team #1	Points earned	Team #2	1st leg	2nd leg
Fluminense (Brazil)	6–0	(Colombia) Atlético Nacional	2–1	1–0
Flamengo (Brazil)	3–3 (gd)	(Mexico) América	4–2	0–3
River Plate (Argentina)	1–4	(Argentina) San Lorenzo	1–2	2–2
Atlas (Mexico)	4–1	(Argentina) Lanús	1–0	2–2
Cruzeiro (Brazil)	0–6	(Argentina) Boca Juniors	1–2	1–2
Estudiantes (Argentina)	3–3 (gd)	(Ecuador) LDU Quito	0–2	2–1
Cúcuta Deportivo (Colombia)	0–6	(Brazil) Santos	0–2	0–2
São Paulo (Brazil)	4–1	(Uruguay) Nacional	0–0	2–0

=== First leg ===
April 29, 2008
20:10 (UTC-3)

Lanús (Argentina)	0 – 1	(Mexico) Atlas
	Report	Marioni 37'

Estadio Ciudad de Lanús - Néstor Díaz Pérez, Lanús
Attendance: 6,104
Referee: Víctor Hugo Rivera (Peru)

April 29, 2008
20:30 (UTC-5)

LDU Quito (Ecuador)	2 – 0	(Argentina) Estudiantes
Guerrón 63'; Manso 77'	Report

Estadio Casa Blanca, Quito
Attendance: 17,540
Referee: Leonardo Gaciba (Brazil)

April 30, 2008
17:40 (UTC-3)

Boca Juniors (Argentina)	2 – 1	(Brazil) Cruzeiro
Riquelme 6'; Dátolo 65'	Report	Fabrício 78'

Estadio Alberto J. Armando (La Bombonera), Buenos Aires
Attendance: 35,137
Referee: Jorge Larrionda (Uruguay)

April 30, 2008
17:45 (UTC-5)

América (Mexico)	2 – 4	(Brazil) Flamengo
Cervantes 45'; Esqueda 72'	Report	Marcinho 44', 70'; Tardelli 89'; Moura 90'

Estadio Azteca, México DF
Referee: Carlos Chandía (Chile)

April 30, 2008
19:45 (UTC-3)

San Lorenzo (Argentina)	2 – 1	(Argentina) River Plate
Silvera 27'; González 87' (pen.)	Report	Falcao 30'

Estadio Pedro Bidegain (Nuevo Gasómetro), Buenos Aires
Attendance: 25,337
Referee: Héctor Baldassi (Argentina)

April 30, 2008
20:00 (UTC-5)

Atlético Nacional (Colombia)	1 – 2	(Brazil) Fluminense
Arrué 53'	Report	Neves 22' (pen.); Conca 72'

Estadio Atanasio Girardot, Medellín
Referee: Martín Vázquez (Uruguay)

April 30, 2008
22:00 (UTC-3)

Nacional (Uruguay)	0 – 0	(Brazil) São Paulo
	Report

Estadio Parque Central, Montevideo
Referee: Rubén Selman (Chile)

May 1, 2008
20:45 (UTC-3)

Santos (Brazil)	2 – 0	(Colombia) Cúcuta Deportivo
Lima 18'; Molina 71'	Report

Estádio Urbano Caldeira (Vila Belmiro), Santos
Attendance: 17,282
Referee: Marco Rodríguez (México)

=== Second leg ===
May 6, 2008
18:30 (UTC-3)

Fluminense (Brazil)	1 – 0	(Colombia) Atlético Nacional
Roger 53'	Report

Estádio Mario Filho (Maracana), Rio de Janeiro
Attendance: 31,700
Referee: Víctor Hugo Rivera (Peru)

Fluminense advanced 6–0 on points.

May 6, 2008
21:00 (UTC-3)

Estudiantes (Argentina)	2 – 1	(Ecuador) LDU Quito
Alayes 46'; Maggiolo 66'	Report	Bolaños 25'

Estadio Ciudad de La Plata, La Plata
Referee: Óscar Ruiz (Colombia)

LDU Quito 3–3 Estudiantes on points. LDU Quito advanced on better goal difference (+1).

May 6, 2008
21:30 (UTC-5)

Atlas (Mexico)	2 – 2	(Argentina) Lanús
Marioni 29'; Mendivil 78'	Report	Sand 64'; Acosta 90'

Estadio Jalisco, Guadalajara
Referee: Carlos Torres (Paraguay)

Atlas advanced 4–1 on points.

May 7, 2008
19:10 (UTC-3)

Cruzeiro (Brazil)	1 – 2	(Argentina) Boca Juniors
Wágner 56'	Report	Palacio 36'; Palermo 44'

Estádio Governador Magalhães Pinto (Mineirão), Belo Horizonte
Attendance: 61,471
Referee: Carlos Chandía (Chile)

Boca Juniors advanced 6–0 on points.

May 7, 2008
21:50 (UTC-3)

Flamengo (Brazil)	0 – 3	(Mexico) América
	Report	Cabañas 20', 77'; Esqueda 38'

Estádio Mario Filho (Maracana), Rio de Janeiro
Attendance: 47,115
Referee: Alfredo Intriago (Ecuador)

América 3–3 Flamengo on points. América advanced on better goal difference (+1).

May 7, 2008
21:50 (UTC-3)

São Paulo (Brazil)	2 – 0	(Uruguay) Nacional
Adriano 37'; Dagoberto 89'	Report

Estádio Cícero Pompeu de Toledo (Morumbí), São Paulo
Attendance: 42,050
Referee: Héctor Baldassi (Argentina)

São Paulo advanced 4–1 on points.

May 8, 2008
20:30 (UTC-3)

River Plate (Argentina)	2 – 2	(Argentina) San Lorenzo
Abelairas 12'; Abreu 62' (pen.)	Report	Bergessio 69', 72'

Estadio Antonio V. Liberti (Monumental), Buenos Aires
Attendance: 56,938
Referee: Sergio Pezzotta (Argentina)

San Lorenzo advanced 4–1 on points.

May 8, 2008
21:15 (UTC-5)

Cúcuta Deportivo (Colombia)	0 – 2	(Brazil) Santos
	Report	Kléber Pereira 40'; Lima 53'

Estadio General Santander, Cúcuta
Referee: Carlos Amarilla (Paraguay)

Santos advanced 6–0 on points.

== Quarterfinals ==
The Quarterfinals were played on May 14, 15, and May 21 and 22. Team #1 played the second leg at home.

Team #1	Points earned	Team #2	1st leg	2nd leg
Fluminense (Brazil)	(gd) 3–3	(Brazil) São Paulo	0–1	3–1
Santos (Brazil)	3–3 (gd)	(Mexico) América	0–2	1–0
LDU Quito (Ecuador)	2–2 (5–3 p)	(Argentina) San Lorenzo	1–1	1–1
Atlas (Mexico)	1–4	(Argentina) Boca Juniors	2–2	0–3

=== First leg ===
May 14, 2008
19:20 (UTC-3)

Boca Juniors (Argentina)	2 – 2	(Mexico) Atlas
Ayala 36' (o.g.); Cáceres 75'	Report	Flores 5'; Torres 88'

Estadio José Amalfitani, Buenos Aires
Attendance: 51,000
Referee: Wilmar Roldán (Colombia)

May 14, 2008
21:50 (UTC-3)

São Paulo (Brazil)	1 – 0	(Brazil) Fluminense
Adriano 19'	Report

Estádio Cícero Pompeu de Toledo (Morumbí), São Paulo
Attendance: 61,593
Referee: Óscar Ruiz (Colombia)

May 15, 2008
19:00 (UTC-3)

San Lorenzo (Argentina)	1 – 1	(Ecuador) LDU Quito
González 38'	Report	Bieler 36'

Estadio Pedro Bidegain (Nuevo Gasómetro), Buenos Aires
Attendance: 35,000
Referee: Carlos Simon (Brazil)

May 15, 2008
19:20 (UTC-5)

América (Mexico)	2 – 0	(Brazil) Santos
Cabañas 25', 62'	Report

Estadio Azteca, México DF
Attendance: 105,000
Referee: Héctor Baldassi (Argentina)

=== Second leg ===
May 21, 2008
17:20 (UTC-5)

Atlas (Mexico)	0 – 3	(Argentina) Boca Juniors
	Report	Palermo 20', 34', 38'

Estadio Jalisco, Guadalajara
Attendance: 56,713
Referee: Rubén Selman (Chile)

Boca Juniors advanced 4–1 on points.

May 21, 2008
21:50 (UTC-3)

Fluminense (Brazil)	3 – 1	(Brazil) São Paulo
Washington 11', 90+1'; Dodô 71'	Report	Adriano 70'

Estádio Mario Filho (Maracaná), Rio de Janeiro
Attendance: 68,191
Referee: Carlos Amarilla (Paraguay)

Fluminense and São Paulo tied 3–3 on points. Fluminense advanced on goal difference (+1).

May 22, 2008
17:20 (UTC-5)

LDU Quito (Ecuador)	1 – 1	(Argentina) San Lorenzo
Manso 27'	Report	Bergessio 47'
Penalties
Urrutia (penalty scored); Campos (penalty scored); Vaca (penalty scored); Guerrón (penalty scored); Bieler (penalty scored)	5 – 3	(penalty scored) González; (penalty scored) D'Alessandro; (penalty missed) Torres; (penalty scored) Alvarado

Estadio Casa Blanca, Quito
Attendance: 55,000
Referee: Marco Rodríguez (México)

LDU Quito and San Lorenzo tied 2–2 on points, and tied 0 on goal difference. LDU Quito advanced 5–3 on penalties.

May 22, 2008
21:50 (UTC-3)

Santos (Brazil)	1 – 0	(Mexico) América
Pereira 62'	Report

Estádio Urbano Caldeira (Vila Belmiro), Santos
Attendance: 19,539
Referee: Jorge Larrionda (Uruguay)

América and Santos tied 3–3 on points. América advanced on goal difference (+1).

== Semifinals ==
The Semifinals were played between May 27, 28, and June 3, 4. Team #1 played the second leg at home.

Team #1	Points earned	Team #2	1st leg	2nd leg
Fluminense (Brazil)	4–1	(Argentina) Boca Juniors	2–2	3–1
LDU Quito (Ecuador)	(a) 2–2	(Mexico) América	1–1	0–0

=== First leg ===
May 27, 2008
20:10 (UTC-5)

América (Mexico)	1 – 1	(Ecuador) LDU Quito
Esqueda 72'	Report	Bolaños 62'

Estadio Azteca, México DF
Attendance: 105,000
Referee: Martín Vázquez (Uruguay)

May 28, 2008
21:50 (UTC-3)

Boca Juniors (Argentina)	2 – 2	(Brazil) Fluminense
Riquelme 12', 65'	Report	Silva 16'; Neves 77'

Estadio Presidente Perón (El Cilindro), Avellaneda
Referee: Roberto Silvera (Uruguay)

=== Second leg ===
June 3, 2008
20:10 (UTC-5)

LDU Quito (Ecuador)	0 – 0	(Mexico) América
	Report

Estadio Casa Blanca, Quito
Attendance: 55,336
Referee: Pablo Pozo (Chile)

LDU Quito 2–2 América on points. LDU Quito advanced on away goals.

June 4, 2008
21:50 (UTC-3)

Fluminense (Brazil)	3 – 1	(Argentina) Boca Juniors
Washington 63'; Ibarra 71' (o.g.); Dodô 90+3'	Report	Palermo 58'

Estádio Mário Filho (Maracanã), Rio de Janeiro
Attendance: 78,856
Referee: Carlos Torres (Paraguay)

Fluminense advanced 4–1 on points.

== Finals ==
Team #1	Points earned	Team #2	1st leg	2nd leg
LDU Quito (Ecuador)	3–3 a.e.t. (3–1 p)	(Brazil) Fluminense	4–2	1–3

=== First leg ===
June 25, 2008
19:50 (UTC-5)

LDU Quito (Ecuador)	4 – 2	(Brazil) Fluminense
Bieler 2'; Guerrón 29'; Campos 34'; Urrutia 45'	Report	Conca 12'; Neves 52'

Estadio La Casa Blanca, Quito
Attendance: 55,359
Referee: Carlos Chandía (Chile)

=== Second leg ===
July 2, 2008
21:50 (UTC-3)

Fluminense (Brazil)	3 – 1 (a.e.t.)	(Ecuador) LDU Quito
Neves 12', 28', 56'	Report	Bolaños 6'
Penalties
Conca (penalty missed); Neves (penalty missed); Cícero (penalty scored); Washington (penalty missed)	1 – 3	(penalty scored) Urrutia; (penalty missed) Campos; (penalty scored) Salas; (penalty scored) Guerrón

Estádio Mário Filho (Maracanã), Rio de Janeiro
Attendance: 86,027
Referee: Héctor Baldassi (Argentina)
