= Matías Urbano =

Argentine footballer

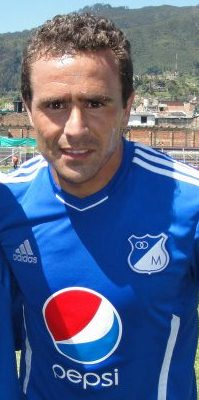
- Urbano during his presentation at Millonarios

Personal information
- Full name: Matías Héctor Sebastián Urbano
- Date of birth: 16 February 1981 (age 45)
- Place of birth: Cipolletti, Argentina
- Height: 1.72 m (5 ft 8 in)
- Position: Striker

Youth career
- 1993–2000: Cipolletti

Senior career*
Years	Team	Apps	(Gls)
2000–2001	Cipolletti	28	(11)
2001	Almirante Brown (Arrecifes)	11	(0)
2002	Talleres de Córdoba	7	(0)
2002	Real Cartagena	16	(6)
2003	Macará	19	(15)
2003	Deportivo Quito	11	(3)
2004	San Lorenzo	1	(0)
2004	León	16	(9)
2005	Cruz Azul Reserves	20	(5)
2006	La Serena	15	(9)
2007	Everton	40	(13)
2008	Cúcuta Deportivo	28	(7)
2009	San Martín de Tucumán	13	(3)
2009–2010	Aurora Pro Patria	24	(2)
2010	Santiago Morning	8	(0)
2011	Unión San Felipe	33	(18)
2012–2013	Millonarios	17	(0)
2013	Unión San Felipe	5	(0)
2013–2014	Cipolletti	25	(3)
2014–2015	Atenas	13	(3)
2015	General Paz Juniors	18	(4)
- * Club domestic league appearances and goals as of 14 April 2012

Matías Héctor Sebastián Urbano (born 16 February 1981 in Cipolletti, Argentina) is a former Argentine footballer, who played as a striker.

== Career ==
Urbano began his career in his hometown playing for Club Cipolletti. He made his debut in first division with Talleres de Córdoba in 2001. He later moved to Colombia where he played for Real Cartagena before migrating to Ecuador to make appearances in the Serie A for Macará and consequently Deportivo Quito. In his first return to Argentina, he signed for San Lorenzo de Almagro, but he was relegated to the bench, playing only in one league game for the cuervos. Struggling to get notice he finally decided to leave the club, and relocated to Mexico where he played for Club León during 2004 and Cruz Azul Oaxaca in 2005. His good performance awoke the interest of Chilean club Deportes La Serena, which signed him for the 2006 season. The following year, he continued playing in Chile for Everton.

In 2008, he transferred to Colombian team Cúcuta Deportivo where he also played in Copa Libertadores scoring 5 goals. In 2009 Urbano joined San Martín de Tucumán making his third spell in the Argentine Primera, but shortly after he joined the Italian team Aurora Pro Patria 1919.

Urbano earned global recognition after scoring a "rabona" goal against Unión La Calera. Six days after his extraordinary goal, he repeated the "rabona" shot, scoring this time against Deportes Iquique.

He retired in 2015.
