= Ronald Vargas =

Venezuelan footballer (born 1986)

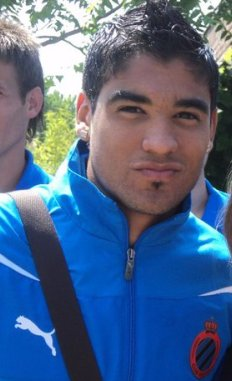
- Ronald Vargas.

Personal information
- Full name: Ronald Alejandro Vargas Aranguren
- Date of birth: 2 December 1986 (age 39)
- Place of birth: Caracas, Venezuela
- Height: 1.73 m (5 ft 8 in)
- Positions: Attacking midfielder; winger

Youth career
- 2002–2006: Caracas

Senior career*
Years	Team	Apps	(Gls)
2006–2008	Caracas	32	(9)
2008–2011	Club Brugge	71	(22)
2011–2014	Anderlecht	25	(4)
2014–2015	Balıkesirspor	25	(6)
2015–2017	AEK Athens	43	(11)
2017–2019	Newcastle Jets	30	(5)
2019–2020	Oostende	18	(3)
2020–2021	Deinze	10	(0)
Total		251	(60)

International career^{‡}
2008–2015	Venezuela	23	(3)
- * Club domestic league appearances and goals as of 21 March 2021 ‡ National team caps and goals as of 14 October 2015

Ronald Alejandro Vargas Aranguren (Spanish pronunciation: [ˈronal(d) ˈβaɾɣas]; (Note: In isolation, Vargas is pronounced [ˈbaɾɣas].) born 2 December 1986) is a Venezuelan former professional footballer who played as a forward.

== Club career ==
=== Caracas ===
Vargas started his career in the youth teams of Caracas. He was promoted to the first team in 2006. His debut in the Copa Libertadores came on 14 March 2006 against Cienciano. Ronald scored his first goal in the final of the 2006–07 Primera División against Unión Atlético Maracaibo, in a 0–1 victory.

The 2007–08 season established him as a regular player in the starting line-up of Caracas. His first goal of the season came on 21 October 2007 in a league match against El Vigía. He ended the campaign with 29 games and 8 goals. In that season he also made his debut in Copa Venezuela and scored his first goal in Copa Libertadores.

=== Club Brugge ===
On 14 May 2008, Vargas signed with the Belgian team Club Brugge on a four-year deal. Caracas received €1.5 million, making this the most expensive transfer from a Venezuelan team in history. He made his debut on 29 August in a league match against AFC Tubize, in a 4–1 victory. His debut in the UEFA Cup came on 18 September, in a 2–2 draw against BSC Young Boys, and he scored his first goal in the competition on 27 November in another draw, this time 1–1, against AS Saint-Étienne.

In the 2010–11 season Ronald started with top performances, scoring, among other goals, four braces against Westerlo, Charleroi, Zulte-Waregem and Standard Liège. Vargas continued his good form in the start of the second part of the tournament, but on 6 February 2011 he suffered an anterior cruciate ligament injury in a league match against KRC Genk, only eight minutes after the start of the match. He was expected to be out for over six months, missing the chance of playing with his national team in the 2011 Copa América.

=== Anderlecht ===
Contractual differences between Vargas and Club Brugge emerged in summer 2011, finishing with his transfer to R.S.C. Anderlecht on 29 June 2011. The transfer fee was reported to be €2.5 million. Because of the rivalry between the two clubs mutual transfers aren't very common. It was the first transfer from Club Brugge to Anderlecht since Aleksandar Ilić in 2000.

Vargas made his debut with the team in a Belgian Cup match against Lommel United, on 21 September. This meant his return seven months after his injury, and he scored once in the 4–0 victory. However, on 26 October he fell injured again on the same knee, in a cup match which Anderlecht lost against Rupel Boom. Kanu fed the ball to Vargas down the left wing, and the Venezuelan looked smooth and he moved infield past his marker. He then tried, and failed, to whip a right-footed cross into the area, but that mattered little as he went down gripping his left knee in obvious, spine-tingling pain. The diagnosis was four months out by the medical staff.

The American team New York Red Bulls and Basel were interested in Ronald Vargas, if Anderlecht managed to get Thorgan Hazard. At the end of this season Vargas finished his contract with Anderlecht. However, the club was willing to keep him one more year. Anderlecht hoped that, with Vargas playing on loan, they would have been able to sell him for more money afterwards.

=== Balıkesirspor ===
On 28 July 2014, Vargas signed a one-year contract with the Super Lig side club Balıkesirspor. On 20 September 2014, he made his debut with the club in a 2–0 home win against Galatasaray and he scored his first goal two months later in a 3–1 home loss against Sivasspor. At the end of the season did not renew his contract with the club.

=== AEK Athens ===
As AEK Athens officially announced that Vargas had signed a contract with his new team. The 28-year-old forward came to Athens and a few hours later he signed his two-year contract with his new team. On 22 August 2015, he made his debut with the club in a 3–0 home win against Platanias scoring the second goal. On 13 November 2015, AEK's midfielder suspended for three games after his red card in a Super League game. The Venezuelan was sent off in the last moments of first half against Asteras Tripolis for hitting an opponent.

On 6 January 2016, AEK won against Levadiakos in their first leg Greek Football Cup tie and are close to qualifying for the last eight of the tournament. Vargas scored a wonderful goal sealing his club victory. On 24 January 2016, thanks to a strike by Venezuelan midfielder, AEK won 1–0 against PAOK and remain at the second Super League position, behind the previous year's champions Olympiacos. Vargas was impressive in January 2016, scoring four times, and was honored by magazine Diario Goleador as the best Venezuelan footballer of the month. AEK Athens manager Gustavo Poyet used the 29-year-old international mostly as right winger, which helped him scoring more and also creating goals for his teammates.

On 13 February 2016, Vargas scoring after Diego Buonanotte's missed penalty kick, helping his club to escape with a 1–0 win against the undefeated champions Olympiacos. It was the key player coming as a substitute in the derby whereas referee sent off visitors' Alberto Botia, Luka Milivojević (for the penalty incident) and home team's Rodrigo Galo Brito, while Felipe Pardo suffered a strain injury during first half. It was named Man of the match. On 28 February 2016, thanks to a free kick from Vargas, who was also the only scorer against PAOK and Olympiacos, AEK beat rivals Panathinaikos 1–0. Greek Cup's final against Olympiakos was most likely the last appearance of Vargas in season, as the 29-year-old international has suffered a left adductor strain injury.

In December 2016, the agent of Venezuelan attacking midfielder was in talks with the administration of AEK over his client's contract extension. The current contract of 30-year-old international expires at the end of 2016–17 season, and his agent wanted to ask technical director of the club Daniel Majstorovic if they are interested in extending it before January 2017 or not. On 22 April 2017, he received an offer for a two-year contract extension, with an annual fee of €300,000. Despite his team's desire to maintain his services, Vargas will leave the club as he isn't pleased with either the offer or his team role. After the announcement of his upcoming departure he was heavily linked with Panathinaikos.

=== Newcastle Jets ===
In September 2017, Vargas signed for Australian A-League club, Newcastle Jets on a one-year deal as their marquee player for the 2017–18 season. In a Round 3 clash with the Brisbane Roar, Vargas suffered a compound fracture of the leg, ruling him out for a large part of the season, a short time in to his A-League career. Four months later, he returned. He appeared in Newcastle's Grand Final loss to Melbourne Victory.

Vargas scored his first goal for Newcastle in their 1–1 draw with Adelaide United FC in Round 2 of the 2018–19 season.

== International career ==
Vargas has played 23 times for the Venezuela national team, scoring 3 goals. His debut came in the 1–0 match against Haití, in February 2008. He scored his first goal in the historic win against Brazil at the Gillete Stadium, in June 2008; his partner Giancarlo Maldonado scored too, and Venezuela won 2–0.

On 9 September 2009, Ronald Vargas scored the last goal in Venezuela's 3–1 victory over Peru.

Vargas was among the 23-final squad for Copa America. Venezuela beat Colombia 1–0 at the 2015 Copa América, the biggest upset of the tournament so far and their first victory over their South American neighbours in the history of the competition. Vargas had an excellent performance, almost gave the Venezuelans the lead in the 27th minute, forcing David Ospina to make a fine reflex save.

== Career statistics ==
=== Club ===
As of match played 21 March 2021

Appearances and goals by club, season and competition
Club	Season	League			Cup		Continental		Total	
Club	Season	Division	Apps	Goals	Apps	Goals	Apps	Goals	Apps	Goals
Caracas	2006–07	Venezuelan Primera División	3	1	0	0	2	0	5	1
Caracas	2007–08	Venezuelan Primera División	29	8	4	0	5	2	38	10
Caracas	Total		32	9	4	0	7	2	43	11
Club Brugge	2008–09	Belgian First Division	22	3	2	0	6	1	30	4
Club Brugge	2009–10	Belgian Pro League	26	4	1	1	7	0	34	5
Club Brugge	2010–11	Belgian Pro League	23	15	1	1	4	0	28	16
Club Brugge	Total		71	22	4	2	17	1	92	25
Anderlecht	2011–12	Belgian Pro League	4	0	2	1	0	0	6	1
Anderlecht	2012–13	Belgian Pro League	11	2	1	0	1	0	13	2
Anderlecht	2013–14	Belgian Pro League	10	2	0	0	1	0	11	2
Anderlecht	Total		25	4	3	1	2	0	30	5
Balıkesirspor	2014–15	Süper Lig	25	6	1	0	—		26	6
AEK Athens	2015–16	Super League Greece	26	9	6	2	—		32	11
AEK Athens	2016–17	Super League Greece	14	2	2	1	2	0	18	3
AEK Athens	Total		40	11	8	3	2	0	50	14
Newcastle Jets	2017–18	A-League	9	0	—		—		9	0
Newcastle Jets	2018–19	A-League	21	5	1	0	2	2	10	3
Newcastle Jets	Total		30	5	1	0	2	2	33	7
Oostende	2019–20	Belgian First Division A	18	3	1	0	—		19	3
Deinze	2020–21	Belgian First Division B	10	0	0	0	—		10	0
Career total			251	60	21	6	30	5	303	71

=== International ===
As of match played 14 October 2015

Appearances and goals by national team and year
National team	Year	Apps	Goals
Venezuela	2008	10	2
Venezuela	2009	3	1
Venezuela	2010	1	0
Venezuela	2011	0	0
Venezuela	2012	1	0
Venezuela	2015	7	0
Total		22	3

As of match played 9 September 2009
Scores and results list Venezuela's goal tally first.

No.	Date	Venue	Opponent	Score	Result	Competition
1	6 June 2008	Gillette Stadium, Foxborough, United States	Brazil	0–2	0–2	Friendly
2	14 June 2008	Estadio Centenario, Montevideo, Uruguay	Uruguay	1–1	1–1	2010 FIFA World Cup qualification
3	9 September 2009	Estadio José Antonio Anzoátegui, Puerto La Cruz, Venezuela	Peru	3–1	3–1	2010 FIFA World Cup qualification

== Honours ==
=== Club ===
Caracas FC

- Venezuelan Primera División: 2006–07

Anderlecht

- Belgian Pro League: 2011–12, 2012–13, 2013–14
- Belgian Supercup: 2012, 2013

AEK

- Greek Football Cup: 2015–16
