= César González (footballer, born 1982) =

Venezuelan footballer

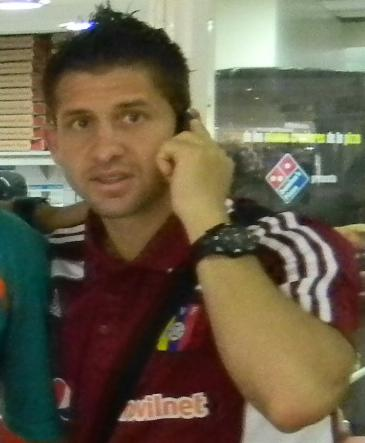

Personal information
- Full name: César Eduardo González Amais
- Date of birth: 1 October 1982 (age 44)
- Place of birth: Maturín, Venezuela
- Height: 1.79 m (5 ft 10 in)
- Position: Winger

Senior career*
Years	Team	Apps	(Gls)
2002–2004	Monagas	59	(12)
2004	Atlético Huila	14	(3)
2005	Deportivo Cali	10	(2)
2005–2007	Caracas	77	(20)
2007–2008	Colón	22	(3)
2008–2009	Huracán	34	(5)
2009–2011	San Luis Potosí	35	(3)
2011	→ Gimnasia LP (loan)	11	(0)
2011–2012	→ River Plate (loan)	12	(1)
2012–2016	Deportivo Táchira	90	(34)
2016–2017	Coritiba	14	(0)
2017–2019	Deportivo La Guaira	80	(17)
2020	Monagas	17	(6)
2021	Atlético Venezuela	18	(0)
2022–2023	CD Dénia		

International career^{‡}
2004–2015	Venezuela	59	(5)
- * Club domestic league appearances and goals as of 6 November 2016 ‡ National team caps and goals as of 14 March 2016

César Eduardo González Amais (Spanish pronunciation: [ˈsesaɾ eˈðwaɾðo ɣonˈsales]; born 1 October 1982), better known as Maestrico González, is a Venezuelan former professional footballer who used to play as a midfielder. González also played for the Venezuela national team for 11 years.

González started his career in 2002 with Monagas Sport Club, in 2004 he moved to Colombia to play for Atlético Huila and then in 2005 he moved to Deportivo Cali also in Colombia, where he was part of the 2005 championship winning squad.

In 2005, he returned to Venezuela to play for Caracas FC where he won two Primera División titles.

In 2007, he was selected to represent Venezuela at the Copa América 2007 and after the tournament he was signed by Argentine club Colón de Santa Fe.

In 2008, he joined Club Atlético Huracán where he was part of the team that finished as runners up in the Clausura 2009 tournament. During the winter transfer he joined Mexican side San Luis Potosí.

In 2011, he has left San Luis de Mexico to join Argentine club Gimnasia y Esgrima La Plata. After six month, he joined River Plate on a loan deal for six months, with an option to buy of around $500,000. After the season ended, River Plate decided not to redeem the option to buy on his contract. On 15 July 2012, Maestrico González signed a three-year contract with Venezuelan football club Deportivo Táchira.

== International career ==
Cesar González has played 56 matches with the national football team of Venezuela, scoring five goals in them. On 9 July 2011, Gonzalez scored from 30 yards against Ecuador in the Copa America to put Venezuela on the verge of qualification to the quarter finals.

=== International goals ===
No.	Date	Venue	Opponent	Score	Result	Competition	Ref.
1.	24 March 2007	Metropolitano de Mérida, Mérida, Venezuela	Cuba	3–1	3–1	Friendly	
2.	3 March 2010	Metropolitano de Lara, Lara, Venezuela	Panama	1–2	1–2	Friendly	
3.	9 July 2011	Padre Ernesto Martearena, Salta, Argentina	Ecuador	1–0	1–0	2011 Copa América	
4.	22 May 2013	Metropolitano de Mérida, Mérida, Venezuela	El Salvador	1–1	2–1	Friendly	
5.	10 September 2013	Estadio José Antonio Anzoátegui, Puerto La Cruz, Venezuela	Peru	2–1	3–2	2014 World Cup qualifier	

== Honours ==
Caracas

- Liga FUTVE: 2005–06, 2006–07

River Plate

- Primera B Nacional: 2011–12

Deportivo Táchira

- Liga FUTVE: 2014–15
