= Robinson Rentería =

Colombian retired footballer (born 1980)

Personal information
- Full name: Luis Robinson Rentería Cuesta
- Date of birth: 4 July 1980 (age 46)
- Place of birth: Quibdó, Colombia
- Height: 1.70 m (5 ft 7 in)
- Position: Striker

Senior career*
Years	Team	Apps	(Gls)
1999–2002	Atlético Nacional		
2001	→ Beijing Guoan (loan)	1	(0)
2003–2004	Caracas FC		
2005	Boyaca Chico F.C.		
2005	C.D. ESPOLI		
2006	Internacional Porto Alegre		
2006–2007	Trujillanos FC		(19)
2007–2008	Estudiantes de Mérida		(7)
2008–2010	Platinum Stars F.C. =		(13)
2010	Cortuluá	3	(0)
2011	Deportivo Anzoátegui	19	(4)
2012	Zamora FC	7	(0)
- * Club domestic league appearances and goals

Luis Robinson Rentería Cuesta is a Colombian retired footballer who played as striker. In 2016, his cousin Manuel Palacios died of stomach wounds after a group of assailants broke into Robinson's parents house.

== Transfers ==
Estudiantes de Mérida

Left Trujillanos FC to Estudiantes de Mérida in 2007.

Anzoategui

Began playing with Deportivo Anzoátegui in the beginning of 2011.

Platinum Stars

Robinson signed with Platinum Stars F.C. leading up to the 2008-09 Premier Soccer League.

== Career ==
Much earlier, in 2006-07 he was pronounced top scorer of the Venezuelan Apertura and Clausura by virtue of scoring 19 goals; he was already leading as top scorer by late October 2006.

With Maritzburg United F.C. in the 2008-09 he scored 10 goals reminiscent of his high scoring tallies.

== Personal life ==
Raised in Colombia, he had five siblings- two of whom followed his footsteps to a football player whereas the other three did academic jobs.
