= 2008 InterLiga =

InterLiga

Tournament details
- Host country: USA
- Dates: January 2–12, 2008
- Teams: 8 (from the FMF confederations)
- Venue(s): Pizza Hut Park; Robertson Stadium; Home Depot Center (in 3 host cities)

Tournament statistics
- Matches played: 14
- Goals scored: 31 (2.21 per match)
- Attendance: 213,540 (15,253 per match)
- Top scorer: (Argentina) Bruno Marioni (5 goals)

The tournament was held between January 2 and January 12, 2008. Eight teams competed for two Copa Libertadores 2008 spots in this tournament.

== Venues ==
City	Stadium Name	Capacity
Frisco, TX	Pizza Hut Park	20,500
Houston, TX	Robertson Stadium	32,000
Carson, CA	Home Depot Center	27,000

== Qualification ==
Once the 2006-07 season was ended, the clubs that participate in the InterLiga were defined:

=== 2006–07 standings ===
Pos	Team	Pld	W	D	L	GF	GA	GD	Pts	Qualification
1	Pachuca	34	19	8	7	68	34	+34	65	CONCACAF Champions Cup 2008 (Note: Pachuca won the Clausura 2007 title and cannot participate because they will be participating in CONCACAF Champions Cup 2008, Morelia has replaced them in the Interliga.)
2	América	34	17	8	9	47	30	+17	59	
3	Cruz Azul	34	17	7	10	49	37	+12	58	
4	Guadalajara	34	16	9	9	53	32	+21	57	Libertadores (Note: Guadalajara qualifies to the Copa Libertadores 2008 as México 1 because they won the Apertura 2006 title, so San Luis has taken their spot in the Interliga.)
5	Atlas	34	14	10	10	45	36	+9	52	
6	UNAM	34	11	16	7	40	29	+11	49	
7	Toluca	34	10	16	8	42	33	+9	46	
8	Monterrey	34	12	10	12	44	44	0	46	
9	Morelia	34	14	3	17	47	51	−4	45	
10	San Luis	34	13	8	13	35	35	0	47	

== Group stage ==
=== Group A ===
Team	Pld	W	D	L	GF	GA	GD	Pts
América	3	3	0	0	6	3	+3	9
Atlas	3	1	1	1	4	3	+1	4
Toluca	3	1	1	1	4	3	+1	4
Morelia	3	0	0	3	1	6	−5	0

- Due to Atlas and Toluca being equal in Wins, Losses, Goals For and Against and Points. The way they decided who qualified to the final round was by a flip of a coin, which was done by Bruno Marioni of Atlas with a sinco peso coin.

=== Group B ===
Team	Pld	W	D	L	GF	GA	GD	Pts
San Luis	3	2	0	1	3	1	+2	6
Cruz Azul	3	2	0	1	2	1	+1	6
Monterrey	3	1	0	2	1	2	−1	3
UNAM	3	1	0	2	1	3	−2	3

== Match schedule ==
Matches at Pizza Hut Park (Frisco, Texas)

1.	2 Jan 08	Monterrey vs UNAM	0-1
2.	2 Jan 08	Cruz Azul vs San Luis	0-1
7.	6 Jan 08	América vs Toluca	2-1
8.	6 Jan 08	Atlas vs Morelia	2-0

Matches at Robertson Stadium (Houston, Texas)

3.	3 Jan 08	Toluca vs Atlas	0-0
4.	3 Jan 08	Morelia vs América	0-1
5.	5 Jan 08	Cruz Azul vs Monterrey	1-0
6.	5 Jan 08	San Luis vs UNAM	2-0

Matches at The Home Depot Center (Carson, California)

9.	8 Jan 08	Monterrey vs San Luis	1-0
10.	8 Jan 08	UNAM vs Cruz Azul	0-1
11.	9 Jan 08	Toluca vs Morelia	3-1
12.	9 Jan 08	Atlas vs América	2-3
13.	12 Jan 08	Final 1: San Luis vs Atlas	0-3
14.	12 Jan 08	Final 2: América vs Cruz Azul	3(5)-3(3)

== Finals ==
Matches at Home Depot Center, Carson, California

12 Jan 08	Final 1: San Luis vs Atlas	0-3
12 Jan 08	Final 2: América vs Cruz Azul	3(5)-3(3)

== Goalscorers ==
The scorers from the InterLiga 2008

Rank	Name	Team	Goals
1	(Argentina) Bruno Marioni	Atlas	5
2	(Mexico) Alejandro Argüello	América	3
2	(Paraguay) Salvador Cabañas	América	3
4	(Argentina) Alfredo Moreno	San Luis	2
4	(Uruguay) Vicente Sánchez	Toluca	2
4	(Paraguay) Jorge Achucarro	Atlas	2
7	(Mexico) Pablo Bonells	UNAM	1
7	(Colombia) Tressor Moreno	San Luis	1
7	(Mexico) Edgar Andrade	Cruz Azul	1
7	(Uruguay) Richard Núñez	América	1
7	(Chile) Humberto Suazo	Monterrey	1
7	(Uruguay) Nicolás Vigneri	Cruz Azul	1
7	(Mexico) Ever Guzmán	Morelia	1
7	(Argentina) Christian Giménez	Toluca	1
7	(Mexico) Zinha	Toluca	1
7	(Mexico) Ismael Rodríguez	América	1
7	(Mexico) César Villaluz	Cruz Azul	1
7	(Mexico) Jaime Lozano	Cruz Azul	1
7	(Mexico) Edgar Lugo	Cruz Azul	1
7	(Uruguay) Rodrigo López	América	1
