= Robert Servín =

Paraguayan footballer (born 1984)

Personal information
- Full name: Robert Antonio Servín
- Date of birth: 18 July 1984 (age 42)
- Place of birth: Cecilio Báez, Paraguay
- Height: 1.82 m (6 ft 0 in)
- Position: Defender

Senior career*
Years	Team	Apps	(Gls)
2003	12 de Octubre		
2004–2008	Sportivo Luqueño	25	(4)
2008	Cerro Porteño	2	(1)
2009–2012	Sportivo Luqueño	91	(6)
2009	→ FC Sion (loan)	0	(0)
2013–2014	Everton	6	(0)
2015	Coquimbo Unido	16	(0)
2015	Deportivo Santaní	19	(3)
2016	Sol de América	19	(5)
2016–2017	Nacional Asunción	21	(0)
2018	Comerciantes Unidos	16	(1)
2019	Sportivo Trinidense		
- * Club domestic league appearances and goals

Robert Antonio Servín (born 18 July 1984 in Cecilio Báez) is a former Paraguayan footballer who played as a defender.

== Career ==
In his homeland, Servín played for 12 de Octubre, Sportivo Luqueño, Cerro Porteño, Deportivo Santaní, Sol de América, Nacional Asunción and Sportivo Trinidense.

Abroad, Servín had stints in Switzerland with FC Sion, Chile with Everton and Coquimbo Unido and Peru with Comerciantes Unidos.
