= 2008 Copa Libertadores First Stage =

The First Stage of the 2008 Copa Santander Libertadores began on January 29 and ended on February 12. Twelve teams qualified directly on this stage.

== Results ==
Team #1 played the second leg at home.

| Teams | | | Scores | | Tie-breakers | | |
| Team #1 | Points | Team #2 | 1st leg | 2nd leg | GD | AG | Pen. |
|---|---|---|---|---|---|---|---|
| Lanús (Argentina) | 3:1 | (Ecuador) Olmedo | 0–1 | 3–0 | +2:−2 | — | — |
| Cerro Porteño (Paraguay) | 3:6 | (Brazil) Cruzeiro | 1–3 | 2–3 | — | — | — |
| Mineros de Guayana (Venezuela) | 2:3 | (Argentina) Arsenal | 0–2 | 2–1 | −1:+1 | — | — |
| La Paz (Bolivia) | 1:2 | (Mexico) Atlas | 0–2 | 1–0 | −1:+1 | — | — |
| Montevideo Wanderers (Uruguay) | 0:1 | (Peru) Cienciano | 0–1 | 0–0 | — | — | — |
| Audax Italiano (Chile) | 4:4 | (Colombia) Boyacá Chicó | 3–4 | 1–0 | 0:0 | 3:0 | — |

== Matches ==
=== First leg ===
January 31, 2008
17:00 (UTC-5)

| Olmedo (Ecuador) | 1–0 | (Argentina) Lanús |
|---|---|---|
| Quiñónez 70' | Report |

Estadio Olímpico, Riobamba
Attendance: 4,036
Referee: Víctor Hugo Rivera (Peru)

January 30, 2008
21:50 (UTC-3)

| Cruzeiro (Brazil) | 3–1 | (Paraguay) Cerro Porteño |
|---|---|---|
| Ramires 40', 89'; Moreno 55' | Report | Cabrera 74' (pen.) |

Estádio Governador Magalhães Pinto (Mineirão), Belo Horizonte
Attendance: 38,885
Referee: Jorge Larrionda (Uruguay)

January 29, 2008
19:30 (UTC-3)

| Arsenal (Argentina) | 2–0 | (Venezuela) Mineros de Guayana |
|---|---|---|
| Calderón 41'; Leguizamón 78' | Report |

Estadio Julio H. Grondona, Sarandí
Attendance: 2,431
Referee: Enrique Osses (Chile)

January 30, 2008
20:10 (UTC-6)

| Atlas (Mexico) | 2–0 | (Bolivia) La Paz |
|---|---|---|
| Mendevil 6'; Rergis 72' | Report |

Estadio Jalisco, Guadalajara
Attendance: 21,595
Referee: Georges Buckley (Peru)

January 31, 2008
19:20 (UTC-5)

| Cienciano (Peru) | 1–0 | (Uruguay) Montevideo Wanderers |
|---|---|---|
| Sawa 12' | Report |

Estadio Garcilaso de la Vega, Cuzco
Attendance: 21,661
Referee: Carlos Vera (Ecuador)

February 7, 2008
19:45 (UTC-5)

| Boyacá Chicó (Colombia) | 4–3 | (Chile) Audax Italiano |
|---|---|---|
| Salazar 8', 90'; Pacheco 37'; Caneo 76' | Report | Ntamak 1' (o.g.); Villanueva 21'; Orellana 60' |

Estadio El Campín, Bogotá
Attendance: 1,161
Referee: Juan Soto (Venezuela)

=== Second leg ===
February 5, 2008
20:00 (UTC-3)

| Lanús (Argentina) | 3–0 | (Ecuador) Olmedo |
|---|---|---|
| Fritzler 57'; Biglieri 77'; Velázquez 83' | Report |

Estadio Ciudad de Lanús - Néstor Díaz Pérez, Lanús
Attendance: 8,241
Referee: Heber Lopes (Brazil)

Lanús and Olmedo tied 3–3 on points. Lanús advanced on goal difference.

February 6, 2008
20:50 (UTC-4)

| Cerro Porteño (Paraguay) | 2–3 | (Brazil) Cruzeiro |
|---|---|---|
| Álvarez 43', 64' | Report | Thiago Heleno 5'; Moreno 53' (pen.); Ramires 57' |

Estadio General Pablo Rojas, Asunción
Attendance: 12,021
Referee: Carlos Chandía (Chile

Cruzeiro advanced 6–0 on points.

February 5, 2008
20:00 (UTC-4:30)

| Mineros de Guayana (Venezuela) | 2–1 | (Argentina) Arsenal |
|---|---|---|
| Pereira 45' (pen.); Dos Santos 58' | Report | Calderón 46' |

Polideportivo Cachamay, Guayana
Attendance: 3,834
Referee: Leonardo Gaciba (Brazil)

Mineros de Guayana and Arsenal tied 3–3 on points. Arsenal advanced on goal difference.

February 6, 2008

| La Paz (Bolivia) | 1–0 | (Mexico) Atlas |
|---|---|---|
| Clavijo 50' | Report |

Estadio Hernando Siles, La Paz
Referee: Antonio Arias (Paraguay)

La Paz and Atlas tied 3–3 on points. Atlas advanced on goal difference.

February 7, 2008
19:30 (UTC-3)

| Montevideo Wanderers (Uruguay) | 0–0 | (Peru) Cienciano |
|---|---|---|
| | Report |

Estadio Centenario, Montevideo
Attendance: 3,615
Referee: Federico Beligoy (Argentina)

Cienciano advanced 4–1 on points.

February 12, 2008
17:00 (UTC-4)

| Audax Italiano (Chile) | 1–0 | (Colombia) Boyacá Chicó |
|---|---|---|
| Broli 80' | Report |

Estadio Monumental, Santiago
Attendance: 2,327
Referee: Óscar Maldonado (Bolivia)

Boyacá Chicó and Audax Italiano tied 3–3 on points. Audax Italiano advanced on away goals.
