= Oliver Fernández (footballer) =

Bolivian footballer (1983-2012)

Personal information
- Full name: Oliver Christian Fernández
- Date of birth: 14 October 1983
- Place of birth: Cochabamba, Bolivia
- Date of death: 5 January 2012 (aged 28)
- Position: Forward

Senior career*
Years	Team	Apps	(Gls)
2008–2009	Club Aurora		
2010	Municipal Real Mamoré		
2011	Club Jorge Wilstermann		
- * Club domestic league appearances and goals

Oliver Christian Fernández (14 October 1983 – 5 January 2012) was a Bolivian football striker.
