= Carlos Solis (footballer) =

Peruvian footballer (born 1981)

Carlos Solís
Personal information
- Full name: Carlos Javier Solís Alvarado
- Date of birth: 22 October 1981 (age 45)
- Place of birth: Lima, Peru
- Height: 1.83 m (6 ft 0 in)
- Position: Centre back

Youth career
- Alianza Lima

Senior career*
Years	Team	Apps	(Gls)
2000–2001	Unión Minas		
2002	Colegio Nacional Iquitos		
2003	Juan Aurich		
2004	Alianza Lima	1	(0)
2004	Estudiantes Medicina	27	(3)
2005	Cienciano	7	(60)
2006–2007	Melgar	52	(3)
2007–2008	Cienciano	50	(8)
2009–2011	Alianza Lima	64	(4)
2012	César Vallejo	23	(1)
2013	León de Huánuco	34	(6)
2014	Sport Huancayo	0	(0)
2014	José Gálvez	5	(0)

International career
2007	Peru	1	(0)
- * Club domestic league appearances and goals as of 19 April 2013

Carlos Javier Solís Alvarado (born 22 October 1981 in Lima) is a Peruvian footballer who plays as a centre back.

He is a penalty kicker, and has well-known heading skills, and scoring several goals in his team. He is well known for his constant barbaric roars in the field, which used to scare his rivals and gain more strength before making a header.

== Club career ==
Solís made his Peruvian First Division debut in the 2000 Descentralizado season with Unión Minas. In 2002 Solis played for Colegio Nacional de Iquitos in the 2002 Copa Perú season. Then in the 2003 season he played for Juan Aurich in the 2003 Copa Perú.

== International career ==
He played for the Peru national football team during the 2010 FIFA World Cup qualifying rounds.
