= Lisandro Moyano =

Argentine footballer

Personal information
- Full name: Lisandro Moyano Elizondo
- Date of birth: 11 July 1983 (age 43)
- Place of birth: Buenos Aires, Argentina
- Position: Forward

Senior career*
Years	Team	Apps	(Gls)
–2004	Estudiantes de Mérida		
2004	Trujillanos		
2005	Deportivo Italmaracaibo		
2006	Monterrey		
2007	San José		
2008	Macará		
2008	Deportivo Jalapa		
2009	Mineros de Guayana		
2009	Aurora		
- * Club domestic league appearances and goals

Lisandro Moyano (born 11 July 1983) is a retired Argentine football striker.
