= Álvaro Pintos =

Uruguayan footballer (born 1977)

Personal information
- Full name: Álvaro Gabriel Pintos Fraga
- Date of birth: 24 October 1977 (age 49)
- Place of birth: Montevideo, Uruguay
- Height: 1.80 m (5 ft 11 in)
- Position: Striker

Senior career*
Years	Team	Apps	(Gls)
1996–2000	Cerro		
2001	Peñarol	20	(2)
2002	Cerro		
2003	Universitario	3	(0)
2004	Central Español	14	(4)
2005	Cerrito	16	(3)
2006	Irapuato	10	(0)
2006–2007	Cerro		
2007	Bella Vista	7	(1)
2008	Real Potosí	19	(15)
2008–2009	Rah Ahan	18	(1)
2009	Wilstermann	10	(3)
2010	Cobresal	34	(11)
2011	San Martín de Tucumán	8	(0)
2011–2012	San José	21	(6)
2012–2014	Cerro	17	(2)
2013–2014	→ Torque (loan)	5	(1)

Managerial career
- 2026: Cerro (interim)
- * Club domestic league appearances and goals

Álvaro Gabriel Pintos Fraga (born 24 October 1977 in Montevideo) is a Uruguayan football manager and former player who played as a striker. He is the current youth sporting director of Cerro.
