= David Cerutti =

Argentine footballer

Personal information
- Full name: Luis David Cerutti
- Date of birth: 20 September 1974 (age 52)
- Place of birth: Morteros, Argentina
- Height: 1.78 m (5 ft 10 in)
- Position: Striker

Senior career*
Years	Team	Apps	(Gls)
1996–2001	Belgrano	51	(7)
2002–2004	Juventud Antoniana	44	(14)
2004–2005	Chacarita Juniors	30	(13)
2005	General Paz Juniors	12	(3)
2006	Sarmiento	6	(1)
2006	Olmedo	13	(2)
2007	Universitario	30	(20)
2008	San José	16	(5)
2009	The Strongest	7	(2)
- * Club domestic league appearances and goals

Luis David Cerutti (born 20 September 1974 in Morteros) is a former Argentine footballer.

== Club career ==
Cerutti previously played for Chacarita Juniors in the Primera B Nacional Argentina during 2005, helping them avoid relegation. After a short stint with Ecuatorian side Olmedo, he relocated to Bolivia where he played for Universitario de Sucre in 2007 and San José during 2008.

Next, Cerutti joined The Strongest for the Campeonato Apertura 2009, but missed the first two opening rounds of matches as his international clearance was not available in time.
