= Edson Zenteno =

Bolivian footballer (born 1978)

Personal information
- Full name: Edson Marcelo Zenteno Álvarez
- Date of birth: 12 August 1978 (age 48)
- Place of birth: Cochabamba, Bolivia
- Height: 1.74 m (5 ft 9 in)
- Position: Midfielder

Senior career*
Years	Team	Apps	(Gls)
2003–2009	Aurora		
2006	→ The Strongest (loan)		
2009–2010	Ciclón		
2010	Guabirá		
2011–2012	Aurora		
2012–2014	Nacional Potosí		
2014–2015	Jorge Wilstermann		
2015	Aurora		
2015–2016	Universitario		
- * Club domestic league appearances and goals

Edson Zenteno (born 12 August 1978) is a Bolivian football midfielder.

He is a brother of Edward Zenteno.
