= Isidro Candiá =

Paraguayan footballer (born 1979)

Personal information
- Full name: Isidro Ramón Candiá Morales
- Date of birth: 15 May 1979 (age 47)
- Place of birth: Luque, Paraguay
- Height: 1.72 m (5 ft 8 in)
- Position: Midfielder

Senior career*
Years	Team	Apps	(Gls)
1999–2001	Sportivo Luqueño		
–2003	Club Libertad		
2004	Universitario de Deportes		
2005	12 de Octubre		
2005	Deportivo Anzoátegui		
2006	Unión Central		
2007	Club Aurora		
2008	Real Potosí		
2009	Independiente Medellín		
2009–2010	Comunicaciones		

International career
1999	Paraguay U20		

Managerial career
- 2018: Club Libertad (assistant)
- * Club domestic league appearances and goals

Isidro Candiá (born 15 May 1979) is a retired Paraguayan football midfielder. He was a squad member for the 1999 FIFA World Youth Championship.
