= 2008 Copa Libertadores =

49th season of Copa Libertadores

2008 Copa Libertadores de América
Copa Santander Libertadores de América 2008 Copa Santander Libertadores da América 2008

Tournament details
- Dates: January 29–July 2
- Teams: 38 (from 11 associations)

Final positions
- Champions: (Ecuador) LDU Quito (1st title)
- Runners-up: (Brazil) Fluminense
- Third place: (Mexico) América (Argentina) Boca Juniors

Tournament statistics
- Matches played: 138
- Goals scored: 358 (2.59 per match)
- Attendance: 2,959,170 (21,443 per match)
- Top scorer(s): (Paraguay) Salvador Cabañas (Bolivia) Marcelo Moreno (8 goals each)
- Best player: (Ecuador) Joffre Guerrón

The 2008 Copa Libertadores de América was the 49th edition of the Copa Libertadores, CONMEBOL's premier annual international club tournament. This marked the first year the competition was sponsored by Spanish bank Santander. As such, the competition is officially the 2008 Copa Santander Libertadores de América for sponsorship reasons. The draw took place on December 19, 2007, in Asunción.

Ecuadorian club LDU Quito won the competition for the first time in a final decided on penalties. It is the first time a team from Ecuador has won the competition. LDU Quito earned a berth in the 2008 FIFA Club World Cup and 2009 Recopa Sudamericana.

== Qualified teams ==
Thirty-eight teams qualified for the competition, with twenty-six teams directly qualifying to the Second Stage and twelve entering in the First Stage. Seven countries sent their Apertura champions and Clausura champions for their first two berths. The remaining berth, or berths in Argentina's case, went to the best-placed non-champions shown by an aggregate table. Brazil's league uses a European-style format and thus does not have an Apertura and Clausura tournament. Therefore, they sent their cup champion and the best four of the Brazilian Serie A. Ecuador sent the top three finishers of their national tournament as determined by the Liguilla Final. Uruguay had a Mini-League (Liguilla) to determine who qualified, and Mexico usespecially the InterLiga to determine two of its qualifiers. The last qualified team in each country played in the First Stage; the defending champion's country had two teams in the first stage because the defending champion automatically qualified.

| Association | Team (berth) | Qualification method |
|---|---|---|
| (Argentina) Argentina; 5+1 berths | Boca Juniors (Argentina 1) | 2007 Copa Libertadores champion |
| (Argentina) Argentina; 5+1 berths | Estudiantes (Argentina 2) | 2006 Apertura champion |
| (Argentina) Argentina; 5+1 berths | San Lorenzo (Argentina 3) | 2007 Clausura champion |
| (Argentina) Argentina; 5+1 berths | River Plate (Argentina 4) | 2006–07 Primera División best-placed non-champion |
| (Argentina) Argentina; 5+1 berths | Arsenal (Argentina 5) | 2006–07 Primera División 2nd best-placed non-champion |
| (Argentina) Argentina; 5+1 berths | Lanús (Argentina 6) | 2006–07 Primera División 3rd best-placed non-champion |
| (Bolivia) Bolivia; 3 berths | Real Potosí (Bolivia 1) | 2007 Apertura champion |
| (Bolivia) Bolivia; 3 berths | San José (Bolivia 2) | 2007 Clausura champion |
| (Bolivia) Bolivia; 3 berths | La Paz (Bolivia 3) | 2007 Apertura and Clausura Runners-up Playoff winner |
| (Brazil) Brazil; 5 berths | São Paulo (Brazil 1) | 2007 Série A champion |
| (Brazil) Brazil; 5 berths | Santos (Brazil 2) | 2007 Série A runner-up |
| (Brazil) Brazil; 5 berths | Flamengo (Brazil 3) | 2007 Série A 3rd place |
| (Brazil) Brazil; 5 berths | Fluminense (Brazil 4) | 2007 Copa do Brasil champion |
| (Brazil) Brazil; 5 berths | Cruzeiro (Brazil 5) | 2007 Série A 5th place |
| (Chile) Chile; 3 berths | Colo-Colo (Chile 1) | 2007 Apertura & 2007 Clausura champion |
| (Chile) Chile; 3 berths | Universidad Católica (Chile 2) | 2007 Apertura runner-up |
| (Chile) Chile; 3 berths | Audax Italiano (Chile 3) | Best-placed team in the 2007 Clausura First Stage |
| (Colombia) Colombia; 3 berths | Atlético Nacional (Colombia 1) | 2007 Apertura & 2007 Finalización champion |
| (Colombia) Colombia; 3 berths | Cúcuta Deportivo (Colombia 2) | 2007 season best-placed non-champion |
| (Colombia) Colombia; 3 berths | Boyacá Chicó (Colombia 3) | 2007 season 2nd best-placed non-champion |
| (Ecuador) Ecuador; 3 berths | LDU Quito (Ecuador 1) | 2007 Serie A champion |
| (Ecuador) Ecuador; 3 berths | Deportivo Cuenca (Ecuador 2) | 2007 Serie A runner-up |
| (Ecuador) Ecuador; 3 berths | Olmedo (Ecuador 2) | 2007 Serie A 3rd place |
| (Paraguay) Paraguay; 3 berths | Sportivo Luqueño (Paraguay 1) | 2007 Apertura champion |
| (Paraguay) Paraguay; 3 berths | Libertad (Paraguay 2) | 2007 Clausura champion |
| (Paraguay) Paraguay; 3 berths | Cerro Porteño (Paraguay 3) | 2007 Primera División best-placed non-champion |
| (Peru) Peru; 3 berths | Universidad San Martín (Peru 1) | 2007 Decentralizado champion |
| (Peru) Peru; 3 berths | Coronel Bolognesi (Peru 2) | 2007 Decentralizado champion |
| (Peru) Peru; 3 berths | Cienciano (Peru 3) | 2007 Decentralizado best-placed non-champion |
| (Uruguay) Uruguay; 3 berths | Danubio (Uruguay 1) | 2006–07 Primera División champion |
| (Uruguay) Uruguay; 3 berths | Nacional (Uruguay 2) | 2007 Liguilla Pre-Libertadores champion |
| (Uruguay) Uruguay; 3 berths | Montevideo Wanderers (Uruguay 3) | 2007 Liguilla Pre-Libertadores runner-up |
| (Venezuela) Venezuela; 3 berths | Caracas (Venezuela 1) | 2006 Apertura champion |
| (Venezuela) Venezuela; 3 berths | Unión Atlético Maracaibo (Venezuela 2) | 2007 Clausura champion |
| (Venezuela) Venezuela; 3 berths | Mineros de Guayana (Venezuela 3) | 2006–07 Primera División best-placed non-finalist |
| (Mexico) Mexico; 3 invitees (CONCACAF) | Guadalajara (Mexico 1) | 2006 Apertura champion |
| (Mexico) Mexico; 3 invitees (CONCACAF) | América (Mexico 2) | 2008 InterLiga winner |
| (Mexico) Mexico; 3 invitees (CONCACAF) | Atlas (Mexico 3) | 2008 InterLiga runner-up |

=== Teams' starting round ===
Second Stage
| (Argentina) Boca Juniors | (Argentina) San Lorenzo | (Argentina) Estudiantes | (Argentina) River Plate |
| (Brazil) Flamengo | (Brazil) São Paulo | (Brazil) Santos | (Brazil) Fluminense |
| (Bolivia) Real Potosí | (Bolivia) San José | (Chile) Colo-Colo | (Chile) Universidad Católica |
| (Colombia) Atlético Nacional | (Colombia) Cúcuta Deportivo | (Ecuador) LDU Quito | (Ecuador) Deportivo Cuenca |
| (Paraguay) Sportivo Luqueño | (Paraguay) Libertad | (Peru) Universidad San Martín | (Peru) Coronel Bolognesi |
| (Uruguay) Danubio | (Uruguay) Nacional | (Venezuela) Caracas | (Venezuela) Unión Atlético Maracaibo |
| (Mexico) Guadalajara | (Mexico) América | | |
First Stage
| (Argentina) Arsenal | (Argentina) Lanús | (Brazil) Cruzeiro | (Bolivia) La Paz |
| (Chile) Audax Italiano | (Colombia) Boyacá Chicó | (Ecuador) Olmedo | (Paraguay) Cerro Porteño |
| (Peru) Cienciano | (Uruguay) Montevideo Wanderers | (Venezuela) Mineros de Guayana | (Mexico) Atlas |

== Round and draw dates ==
The calendar shows the dates of the rounds and draw.

| Date | Event |
|---|---|
| December 19, 2007 | The draw took place |
| January 29-February 12, 2008 | First stage |
| February 12-April 23, 2008 | Second stage |
| April 30-May 7, 2008 | Round of 16 |
| May 14-May 21, 2008 | Quarterfinals |
| May 28-June 4, 2008 | Semifinals |
| June 25-July 2, 2008 | Finals |

== Tie breakers ==
Teams at every stage of the tournament will be awarded points depending on the result of a game: 3 for a win, 1 for a draw, 0 for a loss. The following criteria will be used for breaking ties on points:

1. Goal difference
2. Goals scored
3. Away goals
4. Draw

For the first stage, round of 16, quarterfinals, and semifinals, the fourth criterion is replaced by a penalty shoot-out if necessary. The Finals have their own set of criteria; see the finals section for more details.

== First stage ==
The First Stage was played between January 29 and February 12. Team #1 played the second leg at home.

| Teams | | | Scores | | Tie-breakers | | |
| Team #1 | Points | Team #2 | 1st leg | 2nd leg | GD | AG | Pen. |
|---|---|---|---|---|---|---|---|
| Lanús (Argentina) | 3:3 | (Ecuador) Olmedo | 0–1 | 3–0 | +2:−2 | — | — |
| Cerro Porteño (Paraguay) | 0:6 | (Brazil) Cruzeiro | 1–3 | 2–3 | — | — | — |
| Mineros de Guayana (Venezuela) | 3:3 | (Argentina) Arsenal | 0–2 | 2–1 | −1:+1 | — | — |
| La Paz (Bolivia) | 3:3 | (Mexico) Atlas | 0–2 | 1–0 | −1:+1 | — | — |
| Montevideo Wanderers (Uruguay) | 1:4 | (Peru) Cienciano | 0–1 | 0–0 | — | — | — |
| Audax Italiano (Chile) | 3:3 | (Colombia) Boyacá Chicó | 3–4 | 1–0 | 0:0 | 3:0 | — |

== Second stage ==
A total of 26 teams qualified directly to this phase and were joined by six teams from the First Stage, bringing the total to 32 teams. The top two teams from each group advanced to the round of 16. This stage was played between February 12 and April 23.

In results tables, the home team is listed in the left-hand column.

=== Group 1 ===
| Pos | Team | Pld | W | D | L | GF | GA | GD | Pts | CRU | SLO | CAR | RPO |
|---|---|---|---|---|---|---|---|---|---|---|---|---|---|
| 1 | (Brazil) Cruzeiro | 6 | 3 | 2 | 1 | 11 | 7 | +4 | 11 | | 3–1 | 3–0 | 3–0 |
| 2 | (Argentina) San Lorenzo | 6 | 3 | 1 | 2 | 8 | 7 | +1 | 10 | 0–0 | | 3–0 | 1–0 |
| 3 | (Venezuela) Caracas | 6 | 2 | 1 | 3 | 6 | 11 | −5 | 7 | 1–1 | 2–0 | | 2–1 |
| 4 | (Bolivia) Real Potosí | 6 | 2 | 0 | 4 | 11 | 11 | 0 | 6 | 5–1 | 2–3 | 3–1 | |

Legend: Blue = home team win; Yellow = draw; Red = away team win.

=== Group 2 ===
| Pos | Team | Pld | W | D | L | GF | GA | GD | Pts | ELP | LAN | CUE | DAN |
|---|---|---|---|---|---|---|---|---|---|---|---|---|---|
| 1 | (Argentina) Estudiantes | 6 | 3 | 2 | 1 | 9 | 5 | +4 | 11 | | 0–0 | 2–0 | 2–0 |
| 2 | (Argentina) Lanús | 6 | 2 | 4 | 0 | 9 | 6 | +3 | 10 | 3–3 | | 0–0 | 3–1 |
| 3 | (Ecuador) Deportivo Cuenca | 6 | 1 | 3 | 2 | 2 | 5 | −3 | 6 | 1–0 | 1–1 | | 0–0 |
| 4 | (Uruguay) Danubio | 6 | 1 | 1 | 4 | 5 | 9 | −4 | 4 | 1–2 | 1–2 | 2–0 | |

Legend: Blue = home team win; Yellow = draw; Red = away team win.

=== Group 3 ===
| Pos | Team | Pld | W | D | L | GF | GA | GD | Pts | ATS | BOC | CC | MBO |
|---|---|---|---|---|---|---|---|---|---|---|---|---|---|
| 1 | (Mexico) Atlas | 6 | 3 | 2 | 1 | 11 | 6 | +5 | 11 | | 3–1 | 3–0 | 3–0 |
| 2 | (Argentina) Boca Juniors | 6 | 3 | 1 | 2 | 12 | 9 | +3 | 10 | 3–0 | | 4–3 | 3–0 |
| 3 | (Chile) Colo-Colo | 6 | 3 | 1 | 2 | 11 | 9 | +2 | 10 | 1–1 | 2–0 | | 2–0 |
| 4 | (Venezuela) Unión Atlético Maracaibo | 6 | 0 | 2 | 4 | 3 | 13 | −10 | 2 | 1–1 | 1–1 | 1–3 | |

Legend: Blue = home team win; Yellow = draw; Red = away team win.

=== Group 4 ===
| Pos | Team | Pld | W | D | L | GF | GA | GD | Pts | FLA | NAC | CIE | BSI |
|---|---|---|---|---|---|---|---|---|---|---|---|---|---|
| 1 | (Brazil) Flamengo | 6 | 4 | 1 | 1 | 9 | 4 | +5 | 13 | | 2–0 | 2–1 | 2–0 |
| 2 | (Uruguay) Nacional | 6 | 4 | 0 | 2 | 9 | 5 | +4 | 12 | 3–0 | | 3–1 | 1–0 |
| 3 | (Peru) Cienciano | 6 | 2 | 1 | 3 | 5 | 9 | −4 | 7 | 0–3 | 2–1 | | 1–0 |
| 4 | (Peru) Coronel Bolognesi | 6 | 0 | 2 | 4 | 0 | 5 | −5 | 2 | 0–0 | 0–1 | 0–0 | |

Legend: Blue = home team win; Yellow = draw; Red = away team win.

=== Group 5 ===
| Pos | Team | Pld | W | D | L | GF | GA | GD | Pts | RIV | AME | UC | USM |
|---|---|---|---|---|---|---|---|---|---|---|---|---|---|
| 1 | (Argentina) River Plate | 6 | 4 | 0 | 2 | 14 | 8 | +6 | 12 | | 2–1 | 2–0 | 5–0 |
| 2 | (Mexico) América | 6 | 3 | 0 | 3 | 10 | 10 | 0 | 9 | 4–3 | | 2–1 | 3–1 |
| 3 | (Chile) Universidad Católica | 6 | 3 | 0 | 3 | 6 | 6 | 0 | 9 | 1–2 | 2–0 | | 1–0 |
| 4 | (Peru) Universidad San Martín | 6 | 2 | 0 | 4 | 4 | 10 | −6 | 6 | 2–0 | 1–0 | 0–1 | |

Legend: Blue = home team win; Yellow = draw; Red = away team win.

=== Group 6 ===
| Pos | Team | Pld | W | D | L | GF | GA | GD | Pts | CUC | SFC | GDL | SJO |
|---|---|---|---|---|---|---|---|---|---|---|---|---|---|
| 1 | (Colombia) Cúcuta Deportivo | 6 | 3 | 2 | 1 | 7 | 4 | +3 | 11 | | 0–0 | 1–0 | 0–0 |
| 2 | (Brazil) Santos | 6 | 3 | 1 | 2 | 13 | 6 | +7 | 10 | 2–1 | | 1–0 | 7–0 |
| 3 | (Mexico) Guadalajara | 6 | 3 | 0 | 3 | 8 | 5 | +3 | 9 | 0–1 | 3–2 | | 2–0 |
| 4 | (Bolivia) San José | 6 | 1 | 1 | 4 | 4 | 17 | −13 | 4 | 2–4 | 2–1 | 0–3 | |

Legend: Blue = home team win; Yellow = draw; Red = away team win.

=== Group 7 ===
| Pos | Team | Pld | W | D | L | GF | GA | GD | Pts | SAO | AN | LUQ | AUD |
|---|---|---|---|---|---|---|---|---|---|---|---|---|---|
| 1 | (Brazil) São Paulo | 6 | 3 | 2 | 1 | 6 | 4 | +2 | 11 | | 1–0 | 1–0 | 2–1 |
| 2 | (Colombia) Atlético Nacional | 6 | 2 | 2 | 2 | 8 | 5 | +3 | 8 | 1–1 | | 3–0 | 1–1 |
| 3 | (Paraguay) Sportivo Luqueño | 6 | 2 | 1 | 3 | 8 | 10 | −2 | 7 | 1–1 | 1–3 | | 4–1 |
| 4 | (Chile) Audax Italiano | 6 | 2 | 1 | 3 | 6 | 9 | −3 | 7 | 1–0 | 1–0 | 1–2 | |

Legend: Blue = home team win; Yellow = draw; Red = away team win.

=== Group 8 ===
| Pos | Team | Pld | W | D | L | GF | GA | GD | Pts | FLU | LDU | ARS | LIB |
|---|---|---|---|---|---|---|---|---|---|---|---|---|---|
| 1 | (Brazil) Fluminense | 6 | 4 | 1 | 1 | 11 | 3 | +8 | 13 | | 1–0 | 6–0 | 2–0 |
| 2 | (Ecuador) LDU Quito | 6 | 3 | 1 | 2 | 10 | 5 | +5 | 10 | 0–0 | | 6–1 | 2–0 |
| 3 | (Argentina) Arsenal | 6 | 3 | 0 | 3 | 6 | 14 | −8 | 9 | 2–0 | 0–1 | | 1–0 |
| 4 | (Paraguay) Libertad | 6 | 1 | 0 | 5 | 5 | 10 | −5 | 3 | 1–2 | 3–1 | 1–2 | |

Legend: Blue = home team win; Yellow = draw; Red = away team win.

== Knockout stages ==
The last four stages of the tournament (round of 16, quarterfinals, semifinals, and finals) form a single-elimination tournament, commonly known as a knockout stages. Sixteen teams advanced into the first of these stages: the round of 16.

=== Seeding ===
The 16 qualified teams were seeded according to their results in the Second Stage. The top teams from each group were seeded 1–8, with the team with the most points as seed 1 and the team with the least as seed 8. The second-best teams from each group were seeded 9–16, with the team with the most points as seed 9 and the team with the least as seed 16.

Teams qualified as a group winner
| Seed | Team | Pts | GD | GF | AG |
|---|---|---|---|---|---|
| 1 | (Brazil) Fluminense | 13 | +8 | 11 | 2 |
| 2 | (Brazil) Flamengo | 13 | +4 | 8 | 3 |
| 3 | (Argentina) River Plate | 12 | +6 | 14 | 5 |
| 4 | (Mexico) Atlas | 11 | +5 | 11 | 2 |
| 5 | (Brazil) Cruzeiro | 11 | +4 | 11 | 2 |
| 6 | (Argentina) Estudiantes | 11 | +4 | 9 | 5 |
| 7 | (Colombia) Cúcuta Deportivo | 11 | +3 | 7 | 6 |
| 8 | (Brazil) São Paulo | 11 | +2 | 6 | 2 |

Teams qualified as a runner-up
| Seed | Team | Pts | GD | GF | AG |
|---|---|---|---|---|---|
| 9 | (Uruguay) Nacional | 12 | +4 | 9 | 2 |
| 10 | (Brazil) Santos | 10 | +7 | 13 | 3 |
| 11 | (Ecuador) LDU Quito | 10 | +5 | 10 | 2 |
| 12 | (Argentina) Boca Juniors | 10 | +3 | 12 | 2 |
| 13 | (Argentina) Lanús | 10 | +3 | 9 | 3 |
| 14 | (Argentina) San Lorenzo | 10 | +1 | 8 | 4 |
| 15 | (Mexico) América | 9 | 0 | 10 | 1 |
| 16 | (Colombia) Atlético Nacional | 8 | +3 | 8 | 3 |

=== Bracket ===
Round of 16
1 | (Brazil) Fluminense | 2 | 1
16 | (Colombia) Atlético Nacional | 1 | 0
8 | (Brazil) São Paulo | 0 | 2
9 | (Uruguay) Nacional | 0 | 0
4 | (Mexico) Atlas | 1 | 2
13 | (Argentina) Lanús | 0 | 2
5 | (Brazil) Cruzeiro | 1 | 1
12 | (Argentina) Boca Juniors | 2 | 2
6 | (Argentina) Estudiantes | 0 | 2
11 | (Ecuador) LDU Quito | 2 | 1
3 | (Argentina) River Plate | 1 | 2
14 | (Argentina) San Lorenzo | 2 | 2
7 | (Colombia) Cúcuta Deportivo | 0 | 0
10 | (Brazil) Santos | 2 | 2
2 | (Brazil) Flamengo | 4 | 0
15 | (Mexico) América | 2 | 3

Quarterfinals
1 | (Brazil) Fluminense | 0 | 3
8 | (Brazil) São Paulo | 1 | 1
4 | (Mexico) Atlas | 2 | 0
12 | (Argentina) Boca Juniors | 2 | 3
11 | (Ecuador) LDU Quito (p) | 1 | 1 (5)
14 | (Argentina) San Lorenzo | 1 | 1 (3)
10 | (Brazil) Santos | 0 | 1
15 | (Mexico) América | 2 | 0

Semifinals
1 | (Brazil) Fluminense | 2 | 3
12 | (Argentina) Boca Juniors | 2 | 1
11 | (Ecuador) LDU Quito (a) | 1 | 0
15 | (Mexico) América | 1 | 0

Finals
1 | (Brazil) Fluminense | 2 | 3 (1)
11 | (Ecuador) LDU Quito (p) | 4 | 1 (3)

=== Round of 16 ===
The Round of 16 was played between April 29 and 30, and May 1, 6, and 8. Team #1 played the second leg at home.

| Teams | | | Scores | | Tie-breakers | | |
| Team #1 | Points | Team #2 | 1st leg | 2nd leg | GD | AG | Pen. |
|---|---|---|---|---|---|---|---|
| Fluminense (Brazil) | 6-0 | (Colombia) Atlético Nacional | 2–1 | 1–0 | — | — | — |
| Flamengo (Brazil) | 3-3 | (Mexico) América | 4–2 | 0–3 | −1:+1 | — | — |
| River Plate (Argentina) | 1-4 | (Argentina) San Lorenzo | 1–2 | 2–2 | — | — | — |
| Atlas (Mexico) | 4-1 | (Argentina) Lanús | 1–0 | 2–2 | — | — | — |
| Cruzeiro (Brazil) | 0-6 | (Argentina) Boca Juniors | 1–2 | 1–2 | — | — | — |
| Estudiantes (Argentina) | 3-3 | (Ecuador) LDU Quito | 0–2 | 2–1 | −1:+1 | — | — |
| Cúcuta Deportivo (Colombia) | 0-6 | (Brazil) Santos | 0–2 | 0–2 | — | — | — |
| São Paulo (Brazil) | 4-1 | (Uruguay) Nacional | 0–0 | 2–0 | — | — | — |

=== Quarterfinals ===
The Quarterfinals were played on May 14, 15, and May 21 and 22. Team #1 played the second leg at home.

| Teams | | | Scores | | Tie-breakers | | |
| Team #1 | Points | Team #2 | 1st leg | 2nd leg | GD | AG | Pen. |
|---|---|---|---|---|---|---|---|
| Fluminense (Brazil) | 3:3 | (Brazil) São Paulo | 0–1 | 3–1 | +1:−1 | — | — |
| Atlas (Mexico) | 1:4 | (Argentina) Boca Juniors | 2–2 | 0–3 | — | — | — |
| Santos (Brazil) | 3:3 | (Mexico) América | 0–2 | 1–0 | −1:+1 | — | — |
| LDU Quito (Ecuador) | 2:2 | (Argentina) San Lorenzo | 1–1 | 1–1 | 0:0 | 1:1 | 5:3 |

=== Semifinals ===
The Semifinals were played between May 27, 28, and June 3, 4. Team #1 played the second leg at home.

| Teams | | | Scores | | Tie-breakers | | |
| Team #1 | Points | Team #2 | 1st leg | 2nd leg | GD | AG | Pen. |
|---|---|---|---|---|---|---|---|
| Fluminense (Brazil) | 4:1 | (Argentina) Boca Juniors | 2–2 | 3–1 | — | — | — |
| LDU Quito (Ecuador) | 2:2 | (Mexico) América | 1–1 | 0–0 | 0:0 | 1:0 | — |

=== Finals ===
June 25, 2008
19:50 UTC−05:00

| LDU Quito (Ecuador) | 4–2 | (Brazil) Fluminense |
|---|---|---|
| Bieler 2'; Guerrón 29'; Campos 34'; Urrutia 45' | Report | Conca 12'; Thiago Neves 52' |

Estadio Casa Blanca, Quito
Attendance: 55,359
Referee: Carlos Chandía (Chile)

July 2, 2008
21:50 UTC−03:00

| Fluminense (Brazil) | 3–1 (a.e.t.) | (Ecuador) LDU Quito |
|---|---|---|
| Thiago Neves 12', 28', 56' | Report | Bolaños 6' |
Penalties
| Conca (penalty missed); Thiago Neves (penalty missed); Cícero (penalty scored); Washington (penalty missed) | 1–3 | (penalty scored) Urrutia; (penalty missed) Campos; (penalty scored) Salas; (penalty scored) Guerrón |

Estádio Mario Filho (Maracanã), Rio de Janeiro
Attendance: 86,027
Referee: Héctor Baldassi (Argentina)

Copa Santander Libertadores de América
2008 Champion

LDU Quito
First Title

== Top goalscorers ==
| Pos | Name | Team | Goals |
|---|---|---|---|
| 1 | (Paraguay) Salvador Cabañas | (Mexico) América | 8 |
| 1 | (Bolivia) Marcelo Moreno | (Brazil) Cruzeiro | 8 |
| 3 | (Uruguay) Sebastián Abreu | (Argentina) River Plate | 7 |
| 3 | (Argentina) Bruno Marioni | (Mexico) Atlas | 7 |
| 3 | (Brazil) Thiago Neves | (Brazil) Fluminense | 7 |
| 3 | (Argentina) Martín Palermo | (Argentina) Boca Juniors | 7 |
| 7 | (Brazil) Adriano | (Brazil) São Paulo | 6 |
| 7 | (Brazil) Kléber Pereira | (Brazil) Santos | 6 |
| 7 | (Colombia) Mauricio Molina | (Brazil) Santos | 6 |
| 7 | (Brazil) Washington | (Brazil) Fluminense | 6 |
