= 2006–07 Venezuelan Primera División season =

Venezuelan Primera División
- Season: 2006–07
- Champions: Caracas (9th title)

The 2006–07 season of the Venezuelan Primera División, the top category of Venezuelan football, was played by 10 teams. The national champions were Caracas.

== Torneo Apertura ==
Pos	Team	Pld	W	D	L	GF	GA	GD	Pts
1	Caracas	18	10	6	2	27	12	+15	36
2	Unión Atlético Maracaibo	18	10	6	2	28	17	+11	36
3	Mineros de Guayana	18	7	6	5	27	24	+3	27
4	Deportivo Tachira	18	6	7	5	22	19	+3	25
5	Zamora	18	5	8	5	24	22	+2	23
6	Portuguesa	18	5	8	5	23	23	0	23
7	Carabobo	18	4	9	5	17	22	−5	21
8	Aragua	18	4	7	7	21	24	−3	19
9	Trujillanos	18	3	5	10	21	31	−10	14
10	Monagas	18	1	8	9	14	30	−16	11

== Torneo Clausura ==
Pos	Team	Pld	W	D	L	GF	GA	GD	Pts
1	Unión Atlético Maracaibo	18	9	5	4	28	19	+9	32
2	Caracas	18	8	8	2	25	16	+9	32
3	Mineros de Guayana	18	7	6	5	26	24	+2	27
4	Zamora	18	7	5	6	24	18	+6	26
5	Carabobo	18	6	7	5	17	15	+2	25
6	Monagas	18	5	6	7	13	21	−8	21
7	Aragua	18	4	8	6	19	22	−3	20
8	Deportivo Tachira	18	3	10	5	22	25	−3	19
9	Portuguesa	18	5	4	9	19	26	−7	19
10	Trujillanos	18	4	5	9	20	27	−7	17

== Final Playoff ==
May 6, 2007

Unión Atlético Maracaibo	0–1	Caracas

May 13, 2007

Caracas	0–0	Unión Atlético Maracaibo
