= 2013 Copa Libertadores second stage =

The second stage of the 2013 Copa Libertadores de América was played from February 12 to April 18, 2013. A total of 32 teams competed in the second stage.

== Draw ==
The draw of the tournament was held on December 21, 2012, 11:00 UTC−3, at the CONMEBOL Convention Centre in Luque, Paraguay.

For the second stage, the 32 teams were drawn into eight groups of four containing one team from each of the four seeding pots. The seeding of each team was determined by their association and qualifying berth (as per the rotational agreement established by CONMEBOL, the teams which qualified through berths 1 from Colombia, Ecuador, Peru and Venezuela were seeded into Pot 1 for odd-numbered years, while the teams which qualified through berths 1 from Bolivia, Chile, Paraguay and Uruguay were seeded into Pot 1 for even-numbered years). Teams from the same association in Pots 1 and 3 could not be drawn into the same group. However, a first stage winner, whose identity was not known at the time of the draw, could be drawn into the same group with another team from the same association.

== Seeding ==
The following were the seeding of the 32 teams entered into the second stage draw, which included the 26 automatic qualifiers and the 6 first stage winners:

Pot 1	Pot 2	Pot 3	Pot 4
(Argentina) Arsenal (Argentina) Vélez Sarsfield (Brazil) Corinthians (Brazil) Fluminense (Colombia) Santa Fe (Ecuador) Barcelona (Peru) Sporting Cristal (Venezuela) Deportivo Lara	(Bolivia) The Strongest (Bolivia) San José; Universidad de Chile; Huachipato (Paraguay) Libertad (Paraguay) Cerro Porteño (Uruguay) Nacional (Uruguay) Peñarol	(Argentina) Newell's Old Boys (Argentina) Boca Juniors (Brazil) Palmeiras (Brazil) Atlético Mineiro (Colombia) Millonarios (Ecuador) Emelec (Peru) Real Garcilaso (Venezuela) Caracas	(Mexico) Toluca (Mexico) Tijuana; First stage winner G1; First stage winner G2; First stage winner G3; First stage winner G4; First stage winner G5; First stage winner G6

The following were the first stage winners:

- Winner G1: (Argentina) Tigre
- Winner G2: (Brazil) Grêmio
- Winner G3: (Colombia) Deportes Tolima
- Winner G4: (Paraguay) Olimpia
- Winner G5: (Brazil) São Paulo
- Winner G6: (Chile) Iquique

== Format ==
In the second stage, each group was played on a home-and-away round-robin basis. Each team earned 3 points for a win, 1 point for a draw, and 0 points for a loss. If tied on points, the following criteria were used to determine the ranking: 1. Goal difference; 2. Goals scored; 3. Away goals scored; 4. Drawing of lots. The winners and runners-up of each group advanced to the round of 16.

== Groups ==
The matches were played on February 12–14, 19–21, 26–28, March 5–7, 12–14, April 2–4, 9–11, and 16–18, 2013.

=== Group 1 ===
Pos	Team	Pld	W	D	L	GF	GA	GD	Pts	NAC	BOC	TOL	BAR
1	(Uruguay) Nacional (A)	6	3	1	2	10	6	+4	10		0–1	4–0	2–2
2	(Argentina) Boca Juniors (A)	6	3	0	3	7	7	0	9	0–1		1–2	1–0
3	(Mexico) Toluca	6	2	2	2	8	11	−3	8	2–3	3–2		1–1
4	(Ecuador) Barcelona	6	1	3	2	5	6	−1	6	1–0	1–2	0–0	

Source: RSSSF
Legend: Blue = home team win; Yellow = draw; Red = away team win.
(A) Advanced to round of 16
February 12, 2013
20:15 UTC−2

Nacional (Uruguay)	2–2	(Ecuador) Barcelona
Abreu 69'; Alonso 90+3'	Report	D. Díaz 18'; Nahuelpan 26'

Estadio Gran Parque Central, Montevideo
Referee: Enrique Osses (Chile)
February 13, 2013
21:00 UTC−3

Boca Juniors (Argentina)	1–2	(Mexico) Toluca
Silva 23' (pen.)	Report	Esquivel 58'; Benítez 73'

Estadio Alberto J. Armando, Buenos Aires
Referee: Víctor Carrillo (Peru)

February 19, 2013
20:45 UTC−6

Toluca (Mexico)	2–3	(Uruguay) Nacional
Tejada 22'; Benítez 52'	Report	Sánchez 47', 55'; Alonso 57'

Estadio Nemesio Díez, Toluca
Referee: Wilmar Roldán (Colombia)
February 27, 2013
17:45 UTC−5

Barcelona (Ecuador)	1–2	(Argentina) Boca Juniors
Arroyo 90+3' (pen.)	Report	Martínez 59'; Pérez 63'

Estadio Monumental Isidro Romero Carbo, Guayaquil
Referee: Leandro Vuaden (Brazil)

March 6, 2013
21:15 UTC−6

Toluca (Mexico)	1–1	(Ecuador) Barcelona
Tejada 83'	Report	D. Díaz 36'

Estadio Nemesio Díez, Toluca
Referee: Héber Lopes (Brazil)
March 7, 2013
21:30 UTC−3

Boca Juniors (Argentina)	0–1	(Uruguay) Nacional
	Report	Scotti 20'

Estadio Alberto J. Armando, Buenos Aires
Referee: Carlos Amarilla (Paraguay)

March 13, 2013
17:45 UTC−5

Barcelona (Ecuador)	0–0	(Mexico) Toluca
	Report

Estadio Monumental Isidro Romero Carbo, Guayaquil
Referee: Enrique Cáceres (Paraguay)
March 14, 2013
19:15 UTC−3

Nacional (Uruguay)	0–1	(Argentina) Boca Juniors
	Report	Riquelme 44' (pen.)

Estadio Centenario, Montevideo
Referee: Paulo Oliveira (Brazil)

April 3, 2013
19:45 UTC−3

Boca Juniors (Argentina)	1–0	(Ecuador) Barcelona
Blandi 9'	Report

Estadio Alberto J. Armando, Buenos Aires
Referee: Ricardo Marques (Brazil)
April 4, 2013
19:15 UTC−3

Nacional (Uruguay)	4–0	(Mexico) Toluca
Bueno 11', 89'; Damonte 35'; Alonso 74' (pen.)	Report

Estadio Gran Parque Central, Montevideo
Referee: Héber Lopes (Brazil)

April 17, 2013
17:45 UTC−5

Barcelona (Ecuador)	1–0	(Uruguay) Nacional
Castillejos 37'	Report

Estadio Monumental Isidro Romero Carbo, Guayaquil
Referee: Antonio Arias (Paraguay)
April 17, 2013
17:45 UTC−5

Toluca (Mexico)	3–2	(Argentina) Boca Juniors
Benítez 10'; Flavio Santos 65', 82'	Report	Somoza 45+2'; Fernández 77'

Estadio Nemesio Díez, Toluca
Referee: Imer Machado (Colombia)

=== Group 2 ===
Pos	Team	Pld	W	D	L	GF	GA	GD	Pts	PAL	TIG	LIB	CRI
1	(Brazil) Palmeiras (A)	6	3	0	3	5	5	0	9		2–0	1–0	2–1
2	(Argentina) Tigre (A)	6	3	0	3	9	10	−1	9	1–0		0–2	3–1
3	(Paraguay) Libertad	6	2	2	2	10	9	+1	8	2–0	3–5		2–2
4	(Peru) Sporting Cristal	6	2	2	2	8	8	0	8	1–0	2–0	1–1	

Source: RSSSF
Legend: Blue = home team win; Yellow = draw; Red = away team win.
(A) Advanced to round of 16
February 14, 2013
22:00 UTC−2

Palmeiras (Brazil)	2–1	(Peru) Sporting Cristal
Henrique 40'; Patrick Vieira 69'	Report	Lobatón 52' (pen.)

Estádio do Pacaembu, São Paulo
Attendance: 18,433
Referee: Martín Vázquez (Uruguay)
February 21, 2013
21:30 UTC−3

Tigre (Argentina)	0–2	(Paraguay) Libertad
	Report	Aquino 54' (pen.); González 88'

Estadio José Dellagiovanna, Victoria
Referee: Roberto Silvera (Uruguay)

February 28, 2013
15:00 UTC−5

Sporting Cristal (Peru)	2–0	(Argentina) Tigre
Sheput 30'; Lobatón 58'	Report

Estadio Alberto Gallardo, Lima
Referee: Julio Bascuñán (Chile)
February 28, 2013
19:15 UTC−3

Libertad (Paraguay)	2–0	(Brazil) Palmeiras
Velázquez 11'; Benítez 55'	Report

Estadio Dr. Nicolás Léoz, Asunción
Referee: Juan Soto (Venezuela)

March 6, 2013
19:45 UTC−3

Libertad (Paraguay)	2–2	(Peru) Sporting Cristal
Benítez 68'; J. Núñez 88'	Report	Ávila 25', 65'

Estadio Dr. Nicolás Léoz, Asunción
Referee: Hernando Buitrago (Colombia)
March 6, 2013
19:45 UTC−3

Tigre (Argentina)	1–0	(Brazil) Palmeiras
Peñalba 90+5'	Report

Estadio José Dellagiovanna, Victoria
Referee: Omar Ponce (Ecuador)

March 12, 2013
17:15 UTC−5

Sporting Cristal (Peru)	1–1	(Paraguay) Libertad
Ávila 74'	Report	Velázquez 53'

Estadio Nacional, Lima
Referee: Roberto Silvera (Uruguay)
April 2, 2013
21:30 UTC−3

Palmeiras (Brazil)	2–0	(Argentina) Tigre
Caio 19'; Charles 53'	Report

Estádio do Pacaembu, São Paulo
Referee: Patricio Polic (Chile)

April 9, 2013
21:30 UTC−3

Tigre (Argentina)	3–1	(Peru) Sporting Cristal
Leguizamón 24'; Pérez García 49'; Botta 54'	Report	Lobatón 71'

Estadio José Dellagiovanna, Victoria
Referee: Oscar Maldonado (Bolivia)
April 11, 2013
19:15 UTC−3

Palmeiras (Brazil)	1–0	(Paraguay) Libertad
Charles 54'	Report

Estádio do Pacaembu, São Paulo
Referee: Daniel Fedorczuk (Uruguay)

April 18, 2013
18:45 UTC−4

Libertad (Paraguay)	3–5	(Argentina) Tigre
Samudio 15'; J. Núñez 38'; Velázquez 90+2'	Report	Botta 11', 78'; Pérez García 29', 55'; G. Díaz 36' (pen.)

Estadio Dr. Nicolás Léoz, Asunción
Referee: Wilmar Roldán (Colombia)
April 18, 2013
17:45 UTC−5

Sporting Cristal (Peru)	1–0	(Brazil) Palmeiras
Ávila 49'	Report

Estadio Miguel Grau, Callao
Referee: Enrique Osses (Chile)

=== Group 3 ===
Pos	Team	Pld	W	D	L	GF	GA	GD	Pts	CAM	SPL	ARS	STR
1	(Brazil) Atlético Mineiro (A)	6	5	0	1	16	9	+7	15		2–1	5–2	2–1
2	(Brazil) São Paulo (A)	6	2	1	3	8	8	0	7	2–0		1–1	2–1
3	(Argentina) Arsenal	6	2	1	3	10	15	−5	7	2–5	2–1		2–1
4	(Bolivia) The Strongest	6	2	0	4	8	10	−2	6	1–2	2–1	2–1	

Source: RSSSF
Legend: Blue = home team win; Yellow = draw; Red = away team win.
(A) Advanced to round of 16
February 13, 2013
22:00 UTC−2

Atlético Mineiro (Brazil)	2–1	(Brazil) São Paulo
Jô 14'; Réver 73'	Report	Aloísio 83'

Estádio Independência, Belo Horizonte
Attendance: 18,187
Referee: Marcelo Henrique (Brazil)
February 14, 2013
20:00 UTC−4

The Strongest (Bolivia)	2–1	(Argentina) Arsenal
Chumacero 18'; Cunningham 84'	Report	Benedetto 49'

Estadio Hernando Siles, La Paz
Referee: Antonio Arias (Paraguay)

February 26, 2013
21:45 UTC−3

Arsenal (Argentina)	2–5	(Brazil) Atlético Mineiro
Furch 2'; Aguirre 41'	Report	Bernard 8', 54', 59'; Diego Tardelli 29'; Jô 36'

Estadio Julio Humberto Grondona, Sarandí
Referee: Martín Vázquez (Uruguay)
February 28, 2013
21:30 UTC−3

São Paulo (Brazil)	2–1	(Bolivia) The Strongest
Osvaldo 43'; Luís Fabiano 80'	Report	Barrera 21'

Estádio do Morumbi, São Paulo
Attendance: 31,272
Referee: Enrique Cáceres (Paraguay)

March 7, 2013
19:15 UTC−3

São Paulo (Brazil)	1–1	(Argentina) Arsenal
Jádson 45+3'	Report	Benedetto 49' (pen.)

Estádio do Pacaembu, São Paulo
Referee: Wilmar Roldán (Colombia)
March 7, 2013
21:30 UTC−3

Atlético Mineiro (Brazil)	2–1	(Bolivia) The Strongest
Jô 57'; Ronaldinho 73' (pen.)	Report	Melgar 90+2'

Estádio Independência, Belo Horizonte
Referee: Daniel Fedorczuk (Uruguay)

March 13, 2013
21:00 UTC−4

The Strongest (Bolivia)	1–2	(Brazil) Atlético Mineiro
Reina 44'	Report	Diego Tardelli 10'; Méndez 83' (o.g.)

Estadio Hernando Siles, La Paz
Referee: Julio Quintana (Paraguay)
March 14, 2013
21:30 UTC−3

Arsenal (Argentina)	2–1	(Brazil) São Paulo
Ortiz 66'; Braghieri 85'	Report	Aloísio 73'

Estadio Julio Humberto Grondona, Sarandí
Referee: Omar Ponce (Ecuador)

April 3, 2013
22:00 UTC−3

Atlético Mineiro (Brazil)	5–2	(Argentina) Arsenal
Diego Tardelli 11'; Ronaldinho 15' (pen.), 59'; Luan 47'; Alecsandro 90+3'	Report	Braghieri 40'; Benedetto 85'

Estádio Independência, Belo Horizonte
Referee: Enrique Cáceres (Paraguay)
April 4, 2013
20:30 UTC−4

The Strongest (Bolivia)	2–1	(Brazil) São Paulo
Solíz 15'; Cristaldo 66'	Report	Rogério Ceni 44' (pen.)

Estadio Hernando Siles, La Paz
Referee: Víctor Carrillo (Peru)

April 17, 2013
22:00 UTC−3

Arsenal (Argentina)	2–1	(Bolivia) The Strongest
Rolle 30'; Furch 62'	Report	Reina 90+3'

Estadio Julio Humberto Grondona, Sarandí
Referee: Carlos Vera (Ecuador)
April 17, 2013
22:00 UTC−3

São Paulo (Brazil)	2–0	(Brazil) Atlético Mineiro
Rogério Ceni 57' (pen.); Ademilson 82'	Report

Estádio do Morumbi, São Paulo
Referee: Wilton Sampaio (Brazil)

=== Group 4 ===
Pos	Team	Pld	W	D	L	GF	GA	GD	Pts	VEL	EME	PEN	IQU
1	(Argentina) Vélez Sarsfield (A)	6	4	1	1	10	3	+7	13		0–0	3–1	3–0
2	(Ecuador) Emelec (A)	6	3	1	2	5	4	+1	10	1–0		2–0	2–1
3	(Uruguay) Peñarol	6	3	0	3	7	7	0	9	0–1	1–0		3–0
4	(Chile) Iquique	6	1	0	5	5	13	−8	3	1–3	2–0	1–2	

Source: RSSSF
Legend: Blue = home team win; Yellow = draw; Red = away team win.
(A) Advanced to round of 16
February 12, 2013
19:30 UTC−5

Emelec (Ecuador)	1–0	(Argentina) Vélez Sarsfield
Ferreyra 50' (o.g.)	Report

Estadio George Capwell, Guayaquil
Referee: Wilmar Roldán (Colombia)
February 13, 2013
18:30 UTC−3

Iquique (Chile)	1–2	(Uruguay) Peñarol
Villalobos 59'	Report	Estoyanoff 6'; Olivera 72'

Estadio Tierra de Campeones, Iquique
Referee: Enrique Cáceres (Paraguay)

February 19, 2013
20:15 UTC−2

Peñarol (Uruguay)	1–0	(Ecuador) Emelec
Olivera 68'	Report

Estadio Centenario, Montevideo
Referee: Sandro Ricci (Brazil)
February 20, 2013
19:45 UTC−3

Vélez Sarsfield (Argentina)	3–0	(Chile) Iquique
Insúa 25'; Rescaldani 35'; Gago 69'	Report

Estadio José Amalfitani, Buenos Aires
Referee: Carlos Amarilla (Paraguay)

February 26, 2013
20:30 UTC−2

Peñarol (Uruguay)	0–1	(Argentina) Vélez Sarsfield
	Report	Pratto 87'

Estadio Centenario, Montevideo
Referee: Héber Lopes (Brazil)
February 27, 2013
19:45 UTC−3

Iquique (Chile)	2–0	(Ecuador) Emelec
Ereros 15'; Villalobos 22'	Report

Estadio Tierra de Campeones, Iquique
Referee: Víctor Carrillo (Peru)

March 5, 2013
21:45 UTC−5

Emelec (Ecuador)	2–1	(Chile) Iquique
De Jesús 57'; Angulo 75'	Report	Villalobos 79'

Estadio George Capwell, Guayaquil
Referee: Roberto García (Mexico)
March 12, 2013
19:15 UTC−3

Vélez Sarsfield (Argentina)	3–1	(Uruguay) Peñarol
Bologna 30' (o.g.); Insúa 75' (pen.); Copete 78'	Report	Estoyanoff 24' (pen.)

Estadio José Amalfitani, Buenos Aires
Referee: Leandro Vuaden (Brazil)

April 2, 2013
19:15 UTC−3

Iquique (Chile)	1–3	(Argentina) Vélez Sarsfield
Villalobos 39'	Report	Domínguez 7'; Romero 19'; Copete 51'

Estadio Tierra de Campeones, Iquique
Referee: Sandro Ricci (Brazil)
April 2, 2013
21:45 UTC−5

Emelec (Ecuador)	2–0	(Uruguay) Peñarol
Nasuti 81'; Gaibor 90+4'	Report

Estadio George Capwell, Guayaquil
Referee: Hernando Buitrago (Colombia)

April 9, 2013
19:15 UTC−3

Peñarol (Uruguay)	3–0	(Chile) Iquique
Zalayeta 39', 75'; Aguirregaray 77'	Report

Estadio Centenario, Montevideo
Referee: Julio Quintana (Paraguay)
April 9, 2013
19:15 UTC−3

Vélez Sarsfield (Argentina)	0–0	(Ecuador) Emelec
	Report

Estadio José Amalfitani, Buenos Aires
Referee: Marcelo Henrique (Brazil)

=== Group 5 ===
Pos	Team	Pld	W	D	L	GF	GA	GD	Pts	COR	TIJ	SJO	MIL
1	(Brazil) Corinthians (A)	6	4	1	1	10	2	+8	13		3–0	3–0	2–0
2	(Mexico) Tijuana (A)	6	4	1	1	8	4	+4	13	1–0		4–0	1–0
3	(Bolivia) San José	6	1	2	3	5	11	−6	5	1–1	1–1		2–0
4	(Colombia) Millonarios	6	1	0	5	2	8	−6	3	0–1	0–1	2–1	

Source: RSSSF
Legend: Blue = home team win; Yellow = draw; Red = away team win.
(A) Advanced to round of 16
February 19, 2013
19:30 UTC−5

Millonarios (Colombia)	0–1	(Mexico) Tijuana
	Report	Ruiz 62'

Estadio El Campín, Bogotá
Referee: Marlon Escalante (Venezuela)
February 20, 2013
21:00 UTC−4

San José (Bolivia)	1–1	(Brazil) Corinthians
Saucedo 61'	Report	Guerrero 6'

Estadio Jesús Bermúdez, Oruro
Referee: Carlos Vera (Ecuador)

Note: A 14-year-old San José fan was killed by a flare allegedly launched by Corinthians fans during the match.

February 26, 2013
19:15 UTC−8

Tijuana (Mexico)	4–0	(Bolivia) San José
Castillo 4'; Aguilar 47'; Corona 49'; F. Martínez 74'	Report

Estadio Caliente, Tijuana
Referee: Omar Ponce (Ecuador)
February 27, 2013
22:00 UTC−3

Corinthians (Brazil)	2–0	(Colombia) Millonarios
Guerrero 10'; Pato 48'	Report

Estádio do Pacaembu, São Paulo
Attendance: 4
Referee: Néstor Pitana (Argentina)

March 5, 2013
19:30 UTC−5

Millonarios (Colombia)	2–1	(Bolivia) San José
Franco 17'; Rentería 81'	Report	Saucedo 45+1'

Estadio El Campín, Bogotá
Referee: Henry Gambetta (Peru)
March 6, 2013
17:00 UTC−8

Tijuana (Mexico)	1–0	(Brazil) Corinthians
Gandolfi 67'	Report

Estadio Caliente, Tijuana
Referee: Víctor Carrillo (Peru)

March 13, 2013
22:00 UTC−3

Corinthians (Brazil)	3–0	(Mexico) Tijuana
Pato 28'; Guerrero 37'; Paulinho 83'	Report

Estádio do Pacaembu, São Paulo
Referee: Enrique Osses (Chile)
March 14, 2013
20:30 UTC−4

San José (Bolivia)	2–0	(Colombia) Millonarios
Marcelo Gomes 14'; Saucedo 48'	Report

Estadio Jesús Bermúdez, Oruro
Referee: Patricio Loustau (Argentina)

April 3, 2013
18:45 UTC−4

San José (Bolivia)	1–1	(Mexico) Tijuana
Marcelo Gomes 81'	Report	F. Martínez 66'

Estadio Jesús Bermúdez, Oruro
Referee: Diego Ceballos (Argentina)
April 3, 2013
20:00 UTC−5

Millonarios (Colombia)	0–1	(Brazil) Corinthians
	Report	Danilo 57'

Estadio El Campín, Bogotá
Referee: Saúl Laverni (Argentina)

April 10, 2013
22:00 UTC−3

Corinthians (Brazil)	3–0	(Bolivia) San José
Romarinho 26'; Guerrero 60'; Edenilson 90+3'	Report

Estádio do Pacaembu, São Paulo
Referee: Mauro Vigliano (Argentina)
April 10, 2013
18:00 UTC−7

Tijuana (Mexico)	1–0	(Colombia) Millonarios
F. Martínez 90+4'	Report

Estadio Caliente, Tijuana
Referee: Carlos Amarilla (Paraguay)

=== Group 6 ===
Pos	Team	Pld	W	D	L	GF	GA	GD	Pts	SFE	RGA	TOL	CEP
1	(Colombia) Santa Fe (A)	6	4	2	0	9	4	+5	14		2–0	1–1	1–0
2	(Peru) Real Garcilaso (A)	6	3	1	2	8	7	+1	10	1–1		0–3	5–1
3	(Colombia) Deportes Tolima	6	2	2	2	7	5	+2	8	1–2	0–1		2–1
4	(Paraguay) Cerro Porteño	6	0	1	5	3	11	−8	1	1–2	0–1	0–0	

Source: RSSSF
Legend: Blue = home team win; Yellow = draw; Red = away team win.
(A) Advanced to round of 16
February 13, 2013
21:15 UTC−5

Real Garcilaso (Peru)	1–1	(Colombia) Santa Fe
Bogado 76'	Report	Martínez Borja 16'

Estadio Garcilaso, Cusco
Referee: Julio Bascuñán (Chile)
February 14, 2013
21:15 UTC−5

Deportes Tolima (Colombia)	2–1	(Paraguay) Cerro Porteño
Cardozo 32' (o.g.); D. Silva 59'	Report	W. Martínez 77'

Estadio Manuel Murillo Toro, Ibagué
Referee: Néstor Pitana (Argentina)

February 21, 2013
19:15 UTC−3

Cerro Porteño (Paraguay)	0–1	(Peru) Real Garcilaso
	Report	Ramúa 88'

Estadio General Pablo Rojas, Asunción
Referee: Patricio Loustau (Argentina)
February 21, 2013
19:30 UTC−5

Santa Fe (Colombia)	1–1	(Colombia) Deportes Tolima
Valencia 15'	Report	Andrade 5'

Estadio El Campín, Bogotá
Referee: Adrián Vélez (Colombia)

February 26, 2013
19:45 UTC−5

Deportes Tolima (Colombia)	0–1	(Peru) Real Garcilaso
	Report	Salazar 90+1'

Estadio Manuel Murillo Toro, Ibagué
Referee: Carlos Vera (Ecuador)
March 7, 2013
19:15 UTC−3

Cerro Porteño (Paraguay)	1–2	(Colombia) Santa Fe
Fabbro 45'	Report	Pérez 59' (pen.), 77' (pen.)

Estadio General Pablo Rojas, Asunción
Referee: Carlos Vera (Ecuador)

April 2, 2013
17:15 UTC−5

Real Garcilaso (Peru)	0–3	(Colombia) Deportes Tolima
	Report	Leichtweis 55', 66', 84'

Estadio Garcilaso, Cusco
Referee: Omar Ponce (Ecuador)
April 2, 2013
19:30 UTC−5

Santa Fe (Colombia)	1–0	(Paraguay) Cerro Porteño
Cuero 24'	Report

Estadio El Campín, Bogotá
Referee: Juan Soto (Venezuela)

April 9, 2013
19:30 UTC−5

Deportes Tolima (Colombia)	1–2	(Colombia) Santa Fe
Chará 51'	Report	Martínez Borja 61', 79'

Estadio Manuel Murillo Toro, Ibagué
Referee: Imer Machado (Colombia)
April 10, 2013
17:45 UTC−5

Real Garcilaso (Peru)	5–1	(Paraguay) Cerro Porteño
Gamarra 9', 90'; Montes 37'; Ferreira 74'; Ramos 77'	Report	Nanni 13'

Estadio Garcilaso, Cusco
Referee: Roberto Silvera (Uruguay)

April 16, 2013
20:30 UTC−4

Cerro Porteño (Paraguay)	0–0	(Colombia) Deportes Tolima
	Report

Estadio General Pablo Rojas, Asunción
Referee: Diego Abal (Argentina)
April 16, 2013
19:30 UTC−5

Santa Fe (Colombia)	2–0	(Peru) Real Garcilaso
Medina 47'; Martínez Borja 72'	Report

Estadio El Campín, Bogotá
Referee: Sandro Ricci (Brazil)

=== Group 7 ===
Pos	Team	Pld	W	D	L	GF	GA	GD	Pts	OLI	NEW	UCH	LAR
1	(Paraguay) Olimpia (A)	6	4	1	1	16	7	+9	13		4–1	3–0	2–2
2	(Argentina) Newell's Old Boys (A)	6	3	0	3	11	10	+1	9	3–1		1–2	3–1
3	Universidad de Chile	6	3	0	3	7	9	−2	9	0–1	0–2		2–0
4	(Venezuela) Deportivo Lara	6	1	1	4	8	16	−8	4	1–5	2–1	2–3	

Source: RSSSF
Legend: Blue = home team win; Yellow = draw; Red = away team win.
(A) Advanced to round of 16
February 12, 2013
21:30 UTC−3

Universidad de Chile	2–0	(Venezuela) Deportivo Lara
Ubilla 34', 76'	Report

Estadio Nacional Julio Martínez Prádanos, Santiago
Referee: Omar Ponce (Ecuador)
February 14, 2013
18:45 UTC−3

Newell's Old Boys (Argentina)	3–1	(Paraguay) Olimpia
Scocco 70' (pen.); Orzán 76'; M. Rodríguez 90'	Report	Bareiro 88'

Estadio Marcelo Bielsa, Rosario
Referee: Leandro Vuaden (Brazil)

February 19, 2013
21:30 UTC−3

Olimpia (Paraguay)	3–0	Universidad de Chile
Salgueiro 2'; Ortiz 9'; Candia 48'	Report

Estadio Defensores del Chaco, Asunción
Referee: Martín Vázquez (Uruguay)
February 21, 2013
17:45 UTC−4:30

Deportivo Lara (Venezuela)	2–1	(Argentina) Newell's Old Boys
Gómez 6'; Fernández 50'	Report	Cáceres 90+2'

Estadio Metropolitano de Fútbol de Lara, Barquisimeto
Referee: Ricardo Marques (Brazil)

March 5, 2013
19:15 UTC−3

Olimpia (Paraguay)	2–2	(Venezuela) Deportivo Lara
Bareiro 32', 48'	Report	Fernández 71'; Torrealba 86'

Estadio Defensores del Chaco, Asunción
Referee: Sandro Ricci (Brazil)
March 5, 2013
19:15 UTC−3

Newell's Old Boys (Argentina)	1–2	Universidad de Chile
Scocco 45+2'	Report	Marino 4'; Aránguiz 17' (pen.)

Estadio Marcelo Bielsa, Rosario
Referee: Paulo Oliveira (Brazil)

March 12, 2013
21:30 UTC−3

Universidad de Chile	0–2	(Argentina) Newell's Old Boys
	Report	M. Rodríguez 19'; Tonso 84'

Estadio Nacional Julio Martínez Prádanos, Santiago
Referee: Wilmar Roldán (Colombia)
March 13, 2013
18:15 UTC−4:30

Deportivo Lara (Venezuela)	1–5	(Paraguay) Olimpia
Mosquera 53'	Report	Bareiro 8'; Miranda 25'; Pittoni 42', 47'; Aranda 80'

Estadio Metropolitano de Fútbol de Lara, Barquisimeto
Referee: Roberto García (Mexico)

April 4, 2013
19:15 UTC−3

Newell's Old Boys (Argentina)	3–1	(Venezuela) Deportivo Lara
Pérez 4'; Scocco 43', 89'	Report	Pérez Greco 79'

Estadio Marcelo Bielsa, Rosario
Referee: Raúl Orosco (Bolivia)
April 4, 2013
21:30 UTC−3

Universidad de Chile	0–1	(Paraguay) Olimpia
	Report	Ortiz 50'

Estadio Nacional Julio Martínez Prádanos, Santiago
Referee: Roberto Silvera (Uruguay)

April 11, 2013
20:00 UTC−4:30

Deportivo Lara (Venezuela)	2–3	Universidad de Chile
Torrealba 45+2'; Valoyes 85'	Report	Civelli 45+1'; I. Díaz 47'; Cortés 79'

Estadio Metropolitano de Fútbol de Lara, Barquisimeto
Referee: Diego Lara (Ecuador)
April 11, 2013
20:30 UTC−4

Olimpia (Paraguay)	4–1	(Argentina) Newell's Old Boys
Salgueiro 32' (pen.), 75'; Ferreyra 55', 78'	Report	Casco 47'

Estadio Defensores del Chaco, Asunción
Referee: Hernando Buitrago (Colombia)

=== Group 8 ===
Pos	Team	Pld	W	D	L	GF	GA	GD	Pts	FLU	GRE	HUA	CAR
1	(Brazil) Fluminense (A)	6	3	2	1	5	5	0	11		0–3	1–1	1–0
2	(Brazil) Grêmio (A)	6	2	2	2	10	6	+4	8	0–0		1–2	4–1
3	(Chile) Huachipato	6	2	2	2	10	8	+2	8	1–2	1–1		1–3
4	(Venezuela) Caracas	6	2	0	4	6	12	−6	6	0–1	2–1	0–4	

Source: RSSSF
Legend: Blue = home team win; Yellow = draw; Red = away team win.
(A) Advanced to round of 16
February 13, 2013
19:30 UTC−4:30

Caracas (Venezuela)	0–1	(Brazil) Fluminense
	Report	Fred 32'

Estadio Olímpico, Caracas
Attendance: 13,002
Referee: Hernando Buitrago (Colombia)
February 14, 2013
19:45 UTC−2

Grêmio (Brazil)	1–2	(Chile) Huachipato
Barcos 55' (pen.)	Report	Falcone 17'; Rodríguez 51'

Arena do Grêmio, Porto Alegre
Attendance: 29,174
Referee: Diego Abal (Argentina)

February 20, 2013
19:45 UTC−3

Huachipato (Chile)	1–3	(Venezuela) Caracas
Aceval 64'	Report	Cure 13'; Peña 45+2', 54'

Estadio CAP, Talcahuano
Referee: Raúl Orosco (Bolivia)
February 20, 2013
22:00 UTC−3

Fluminense (Brazil)	0–3	(Brazil) Grêmio
	Report	Bruno 33' (o.g.); André Santos 55'; Vargas 69'

Estádio Olímpico João Havelange, Rio de Janeiro
Attendance: 22,151
Referee: Paulo Oliveira (Brazil)

February 27, 2013
22:00 UTC−3

Huachipato (Chile)	1–2	(Brazil) Fluminense
Rodríguez 45+1'	Report	Wellington Nem 67'; Wágner 76'

Estadio CAP, Talcahuano
Attendance: 4,167
Referee: Saúl Laverni (Argentina)
March 5, 2013
21:30 UTC−3

Grêmio (Brazil)	4–1	(Venezuela) Caracas
Barcos 17'; Werley 39'; Zé Roberto 52', 72'	Report	Sánchez 60'

Arena do Grêmio, Porto Alegre
Referee: Antonio Arias (Paraguay)

March 6, 2013
22:00 UTC−3

Fluminense (Brazil)	1–1	(Chile) Huachipato
Fred 31' (pen.)	Report	N. Núñez 71'

Estádio Olímpico João Havelange, Rio de Janeiro
Attendance: 13,678
Referee: Germán Delfino (Argentina)
March 12, 2013
20:00 UTC−4:30

Caracas (Venezuela)	2–1	(Brazil) Grêmio
Peña 45+2'; Farías 67'	Report	Elano 18'

Estadio Olímpico, Caracas
Attendance: 7,000
Referee: Oscar Maldonado (Bolivia)

April 3, 2013
18:15 UTC−4:30

Caracas (Venezuela)	0–4	(Chile) Huachipato
	Report	Rodríguez 8', 36', 63'; Falcone 87'

Estadio Olímpico, Caracas
Referee: Henry Gambetta (Peru)
April 10, 2013
22:00 UTC−3

Grêmio (Brazil)	0–0	(Brazil) Fluminense
	Report

Arena do Grêmio, Porto Alegre
Attendance: 38,533
Referee: Ricardo Marques (Brazil)

April 18, 2013
22:00 UTC−3

Huachipato (Chile)	1–1	(Brazil) Grêmio
Aceval 89'	Report	Zé Roberto 34'

Estadio CAP, Talcahuano
Referee: Martín Vázquez (Uruguay)
April 18, 2013
22:00 UTC−3

Fluminense (Brazil)	1–0	(Venezuela) Caracas
Rafael Sóbis 54'	Report

Estádio São Januário, Rio de Janeiro
Attendance: 12,158
Referee: Néstor Pitana (Argentina)
