= 2013 Clube Atlético Mineiro season =

Atlético Mineiro
2013 season
- Chairman: Alexandre Kalil
- Manager: Cuca
- Stadium: Estádio Independência; Mineirão
- Série A: 8th place
- Campeonato Mineiro: Winners
- Copa Libertadores: Winners
- Copa do Brasil: Round of 16
- FIFA Club World Cup: 3rd place
Home colours	Away colours

== Current squad ==
Note: Flags indicate national team as defined under FIFA eligibility rules; some limited exceptions apply. Players may hold more than one non-FIFA nationality.

No.	Pos.	Nation	Player
1	GK	BRA	Victor
2	DF	BRA	Marcos Rocha
3	DF	BRA	Leonardo Silva (vice-captain)
4	DF	BRA	Réver (captain)
5	MF	BRA	Pierre
6	DF	BRA	Júnior César (on loan from Flamengo)
7	FW	BRA	Jô
8	MF	BRA	Leandro Donizete
9	FW	BRA	Diego Tardelli
10	FW	BRA	Ronaldinho
11	MF	BRA	Bernard
13	DF	BRA	Rafael Marques
14	MF	BRA	Lucas Cândido
15	MF	BRA	Gilberto Silva

No.	Pos.	Nation	Player
17	FW	BRA	Guilherme
19	FW	BRA	Alecsandro
20	MF	BRA	Richarlyson
21	MF	BRA	Leleu
23	GK	BRA	Lee
25	FW	BRA	Neto Berola
26	DF	BRA	Carlos César
27	FW	BRA	Luan
28	MF	BRA	Josué
29	DF	BRA	Michel (on loan from Almería)
35	GK	BRA	Paulo Victor
36	DF	BRA	Jemerson
87	GK	BRA	Giovanni
88	MF	BRA	Rosinei

== Transfers ==
=== In ===
Position	Player	Transferred from	Fee	Date	Source
MF	Gilberto Silva	Grêmio	Free transfer	31 December 2012	
MF	Rosinei	Club América	Free transfer	31 December 2012	
FW	Luan	Ponte Preta	Undisclosed	23 November 2012	
FW	Alecsandro	Vasco da Gama	Undisclosed	7 January 2013	
MF	Morais		Free transfer	9 January 2013	
DF	Eron	Atlético Goianiense	Loan return	13 January 2013	
MF	Nikão	Ponte Preta	Loan return	13 January 2013	
FW	Araújo	Náutico	Free transfer	16 January 2013	
FW	Diego Tardelli	Al-Gharafa	€5,25M	5 February 2013	
MF	Josué	Wolfsburg	Free transfer	26 March 2013	

=== Out ===
Position	Player	Transferred To	Fee	Date	Source
MF	Damián Escudero	Boca Juniors	Loan return	31 December 2012	
FW	Juninho	Atlético Goianiense	Loan return	31 December 2012	
DF	Triguinho	Red Bull Brasil	End of contract	31 December 2012	
MF	Fillipe Soutto	Vasco da Gama	On loan	4 January 2013	
DF	Eron	Goiás	On loan	5 February 2013	
MF	Nikão	América-MG	On loan	19 March 2013	
FW	Araújo	Goiás	Free transfer	14 May 2013	
MF	Serginho	Criciúma	On loan	29 May 2013	

== Statistics ==
=== Top scorers ===
Position	Nation	Playing position	Name	Campeonato Mineiro	Copa Libertadores	Campeonato Brasileiro	Copa do Brasil	Total
1		FW	Jô	6	7	0	0	13
2		FW	Diego Tardelli	4	6	1	0	11
3		MF	Ronaldinho	4	4	2	0	10
4		MF	Bernard	2	4	1	0	7
=		DF	Réver	5	2	0	0	7
6		FW	Luan	4	2	0	0	6
7		FW	Alecsandro	2	1	2	0	5
=		FW	Guilherme	3	1	0	0	4
=		MF	Rosinei	2	0	2	0	4
10		MF	Josué	2	0	0	0	2
=		MF	Leandro Donizete	2	0	0	0	2
=		DF	Leonardo Silva	1	1	0	0	2
13		FW	Araújo	1	0	0	0	1
=		MF	Gilberto Silva	1	0	0	0	1
=		MF	Leleu	0	0	1	0	1
=		DF	Marcos Rocha	1	0	0	0	1
=		MF	Richarlyson	1	0	0	0	1
/	/	/	Own goals	0	1	0	0	1
			Total	41	29	9	0	79

=== Managers performance ===
Name	Nationality	From	To	P	W	D	L	GF	GA	Win%
Cuca	Brazil	3 February	21 December	71	37	15	19	127	81	52.11%

=== Overview ===
Competition	First match	Last match	Starting round	Final position	Record							
Competition	First match	Last match	Starting round	Final position	Pld	W	D	L	GF	GA	GD	Win %
Série A	26 May 2013	7 December 2013	Matchday 1	8th place	38	15	12	11	49	38	+11	39.47
Copa do Brasil	22 August 2013	28 August 2013	Round of 16	Round of 16	2	0	1	1	4	6	−2	0.00
Campeonato Mineiro	3 February 2013	19 May 2013	Matchday 1	Winners	15	12	0	3	41	14	+27	80.00
Copa Libertadores	13 February 2013	24 July 2013	Group Stage	Winners	14	9	2	3	29	18	+11	64.29
FIFA Club World Cup	18 December 2013	21 December 2013	Matchday 1	3rd place	2	1	0	1	4	5	−1	50.00
Total					71	37	15	19	127	81	+46	52.11

Source: Competitions

== Competitions ==
=== Campeonato Mineiro ===
==== Results summary ====
Overall								Home						Away					
Pld	W	D	L	GF	GA	GD	Pts	W	D	L	GF	GA	GD	W	D	L	GF	GA	GD
15	12	0	3	41	14	+27	36	8	0	0	29	6	+23	4	0	3	12	8	+4

3 February Round 3	Cruzeiro	2–1	Atlético Mineiro	Belo Horizonte
17:00 UTC−02:00	Marcos Rocha 22' (o.g.); Dagoberto 61'	Report (pt)	Araújo 27'	Stadium: Mineirão; Attendance: 52,989; Referee: Cleisson Veloso Pereira

6 February Round 1	Tombense	1–2	Atlético Mineiro	Tombos
19:30 UTC−02:00	Éder Luis 30'	Report (pt)	Jô 34'; Rosinei 55'	Stadium: Estádio Antônio Guimarães Almeida; Referee: Emerson de Almeida Ferreira

17 February Round 2	Atlético Mineiro	3–0	Araxá	Belo Horizonte
16:00 UTC−03:00	Jô 22'; Bernard 69'; Alecsandro 86'	Report (pt)		Stadium: Estádio Independência; Attendance: 13,796; Referee: Igor Junio Benevenuto

3 March Round 4	Atlético Mineiro	3–1	Guarani	Belo Horizonte
16:00 UTC−03:00	Diego Tardelli 45' (pen.), 89' (pen.); Richarlyson 77'	Report (pt)	Eric 81'	Stadium: Estádio Independência; Attendance: 13,036; Referee: Cleisson Veloso Pereira

17 March Round 6	Atlético Mineiro	5–2	América Mineiro	Belo Horizonte
16:00 UTC−03:00	Leandro Donizete 32'; Réver 57', 59', 78'; Diego Tardelli 82'	Report (pt)	Fábio Júnior 9'; Laércio 79'	Stadium: Estádio Independência; Attendance: 16,281; Referee: Cleisson Veloso Pereira

20 March Round 5	América-TO	0–2	Atlético Mineiro	Teófilo Otoni
19:30 UTC−03:00		Report (pt)	Réver 60'; Ronaldinho 71'	Stadium: Estádio Nassri Mattar; Attendance: 3,050; Referee: Igor Junio Benevenuto

24 March Round 7	Nacional	1–3	Atlético Mineiro	Patos de Minas
18:30 UTC−03:00	Caleb 57'	Report (pt)	Guilherme 47'; Bernard 79'; Alecsandro 90+2'	Stadium: Estádio Bernardo Rubinger de Queiroz; Referee: Emerson de Almeida Ferreira

31 March Round 8	Atlético Mineiro	4–1	Tupi	Belo Horizonte
16:00 UTC−03:00	Réver 17'; Jô 25'; Josué 58'; Ronaldinho 63'	Report (pt)	Alonso 88'	Stadium: Estádio Independência; Attendance: 14,413; Referee: Cleisson Veloso Pereira

7 April Round 9	Atlético Mineiro	4–0	Boa	Belo Horizonte
16:00 UTC−03:00	Jô 35', 85'; Luan 58', 63'	Report (pt)		Stadium: Estádio Independência; Referee: Wanderson Alves de Souza

14 April Round 10	Caldense	2–1	Atlético Mineiro	Poços de Caldas
16:00 UTC−03:00	Nena 64'; Chimba 81'	Report (pt)	Guilherme 45+2'	Stadium: Ronaldão; Referee: Renato Cardoso Conceição

21 April Round 11	Atlético Mineiro	2–1	Villa Nova	Belo Horizonte
16:00 UTC−03:00	Ronaldinho 31'; Rosinei 81'	Report (pt)	Max Carrasco 17'	Stadium: Mineirão; Attendance: 47,625; Referee: Cleisson Veloso Pereira

=== Semi-finals ===
27 April First Leg	Tombense	0–2	Atlético Mineiro	Tombos
16:00 UTC−03:00		Report (pt)	Luan 26'; Leandro Donizete 81'	Stadium: Estádio Antônio Guimarães Almeida; Attendance: 2,451; Referee: Alício Pena Júnior

5 May Second Leg	Atlético Mineiro	5–1 (7–1 agg.)	Tombense	Belo Horizonte
16:00 UTC−03:00	Luan 9'; Gilberto Silva 19'; Leonardo Silva 41'; Josué 57'; Guilherme 76'	Report (pt)		Stadium: Estádio Independência; Attendance: 9,307; Referee: Renato Cardoso Conceição

=== Finals ===
12 May First Leg	Atlético Mineiro	3–0	Cruzeiro	Belo Horizonte
16:00 UTC−03:00	Jô 14'; Diego Tardelli 71'; Marcos Rocha 78'	Report (pt)		Stadium: Estádio Independência; Attendance: 19,442; Referee: Luiz Flávio de Oliveira

19 May Second Leg	Cruzeiro	2–1 (2–4 agg.)	Atlético Mineiro	Belo Horizonte
16:00 UTC−03:00	Dagoberto 17' (pen.), 33' (pen.)	Report (pt)	Ronaldinho 78' (pen.)	Stadium: Mineirão; Attendance: 42,142; Referee: Leandro Pedro Vuaden

=== Copa Libertadores ===
==== Results summary ====
Overall								Home						Away					
Pld	W	D	L	GF	GA	GD	Pts	W	D	L	GF	GA	GD	W	D	L	GF	GA	GD
14	9	2	3	29	18	+11	29	6	1	0	18	6	+12	3	1	3	11	12	−1

==== Group stage ====
Pos	Team	Pld	W	D	L	GF	GA	GD	Pts
1	(Brazil) Atlético Mineiro (A)	6	5	0	1	16	9	+7	15
2	(Brazil) São Paulo (A)	6	2	1	3	8	8	0	7
3	(Argentina) Arsenal	6	2	1	3	10	15	−5	7
4	(Bolivia) The Strongest	6	2	0	4	8	10	−2	6

Source: RSSSF
(A) Advanced to round of 16

13 February 1	Atlético Mineiro	2–1	São Paulo	Belo Horizonte
22:00 UTC−02:00	Jô 13'; Réver 72'	Report (es)	Aloísio 82'	Stadium: Estádio Independência; Attendance: 18,187; Referee: Marcelo de Lima Henrique

26 February 2	Arsenal	2–5	Atlético Mineiro	Sarandí
21:45 UTC−03:00	Furch 2'; Aguirre 41'	Report (es)	Bernard 8', 54', 59'; Diego Tardelli 29'; Jô 36'	Stadium: Estadio Julio H. Grondona; Referee: Martin Vázquez (Uruguay)

7 March 3	Atlético Mineiro	2–1	The Strongest	Belo Horizonte
21:30 UTC−03:00	Jô 57'; Ronaldinho 74' (pen.)	Report (es)	Melgar 90+1'	Stadium: Estádio Independência; Referee: Daniel Fedorczuk (Uruguay)

13 March 4	The Strongest	1–2	Atlético Mineiro	La Paz
22:00 UTC−03:00	Reina 44'	Report	Diego Tardelli 10'; Méndez 82' (o.g.)	Stadium: Estadio Hernando Siles; Referee: Julio Quintana (Paraguay)

3 April 5	Atlético Mineiro	5–2	Arsenal	Belo Horizonte
22:00 UTC−03:00	Diego Tardelli 11'; Ronaldinho 15' (pen.), 59'; Luan 47'; Alecsandro 90+3'	Report	Braghieri 40'; Benedetto 85'	Stadium: Estádio Independência; Referee: Enrique Cáceres (Paraguay)

17 April 6	São Paulo	2–0	Atlético Mineiro	São Paulo
22:00 UTC−03:00	Rogério Ceni 57' (pen.); Ademilson 82'	Report (es)		Stadium: Estádio Cícero Pompeu de Toledo (Morumbi); Attendance: 50,403; Referee: Wilton Sampaio

==== Knockout phase ====
===== Round of 16 =====
2 May First leg	São Paulo	1–2	Atlético Mineiro	São Paulo
20:15 UTC−03:00	Jádson 9'	Report	Ronaldinho 42'; Diego Tardelli 59'	Stadium: Estádio Cícero Pompeu de Toledo (Morumbi); Attendance: 57,401; Referee: Antonio Arias (Paraguay)

8 May Second leg	Atlético Mineiro	4–1 (6–2 agg.)	São Paulo	Belo Horizonte
22:00 UTC−03:00	Jô 18', 59', 66'; Diego Tardelli 61'	Report	Luís Fabiano 73'	Stadium: Estádio Raimundo Sampaio (Independência); Referee: Roberto Silvera (Uruguay)

===== Quarter-finals =====
23 May First leg	Tijuana	2–2	Atlético Mineiro	Tijuana
21:30 UTC−03:00	Riascos 33'; F. Martínez 54'	Report	Diego Tardelli 67'; Luan 90+3'	Stadium: Caliente; Referee: Hernando Buitrago (Colombia)

30 May Second leg	Atlético Mineiro	1–1 (3a – 3 agg.)	Tijuana	Belo Horizonte
22:00 UTC−03:00	Réver 40'	Report	Riascos 25'	Stadium: Estádio Raimundo Sampaio (Independência); Attendance: 20,988; Referee: Patricio Polic (Chile)

===== Semi-finals =====
3 July First leg	Newell's Old Boys	2–0	Atlético Mineiro	Rosario
21:50 UTC−03:00	M. Rodríguez 62'; Scocco 81'	Report		Stadium: Estadio Marcelo Bielsa; Referee: Estadio Marcelo Bielsa, Rosario

10 July Second leg	Atlético Mineiro	2–0 (2–2 agg.) (3–2 p)	Newell's Old Boys	Belo Horizonte
21:50 UTC−03:00	Bernard 3'; Guilherme 90+6'	Report		Stadium: Estádio Raimundo Sampaio (Independência); Referee: Roberto Silvera (Uruguay)
	Penalties
	Alecsandro (penalty scored); Guilherme (penalty scored); Jô (penalty missed); Richarlyson (penalty missed); Ronaldinho (penalty scored)		(penalty scored) Scocco; (penalty scored) Vergini; (penalty missed) Casco; (penalty missed) Cruzado; (penalty missed) M. Rodríguez

===== Finals =====
17 July	Olimpia	2–0	Atlético Mineiro	Asunción
21:50 UTC−03:00	A. Silva 23'; Pittoni 90+4'	Report		Stadium: Estadio Defensores del Chaco; Referee: Néstor Pitana (Argentina)

24 July	Atlético Mineiro	2–0 (a.e.t.) (2–2 agg.) (4–3 p)	Olimpia	Belo Horizonte
21:50 UTC−03:00	Jô 47'; Leonardo Silva 87'	Report		Stadium: Estádio Governador Magalhães Pinto (Mineirão); Referee: Wilmar Roldán (Colombia)
	Penalties
	Alecsandro (penalty scored); Guilherme (penalty scored); Jô (penalty scored); Leonardo Silva (penalty scored)		(penalty missed) Miranda; (penalty scored) Ferreyra; (penalty scored) Candia; (penalty scored) Aranda; (penalty missed) Giménez

=== Campeonato Brasileiro ===
==== Results summary ====
Overall								Home						Away					
Pld	W	D	L	GF	GA	GD	Pts	W	D	L	GF	GA	GD	W	D	L	GF	GA	GD
38	15	12	11	49	38	+11	57	13	5	1	41	15	+26	2	7	10	8	23	−15

==== Matches ====
26 May 1	Coritiba	2–1	Atlético Mineiro	Curitiba
19:30 UTC−03:00	Deivid 53'; Arthur 90+1'	Report (pt)	Diego Tardelli 49'	Stadium: Estádio Couto Pereira; Attendance: 14,189; Referee: Wagner do Nascimento Magalhães

2 June 3	Atlético Mineiro	0–0	São Paulo	Belo Horizonte
18:30 UTC−03:00		Report (pt)		Stadium: Estádio Independência; Attendance: 10,830; Referee: Sandro Meira Ricci

5 June 4	Vasco da Gama	2–0	Atlético Mineiro	Rio de Janeiro
21:00 UTC−03:00	Alisson 70'; Abuda 90+4'	Report (pt)		Stadium: Estádio Raulino de Oliveira; Attendance: 2,744; Referee: Raphael Claus

9 June 2	Atlético Mineiro	2–0	Grêmio	Sete Lagoas
18:30 UTC−03:00	Ronaldinho 59' (pen.), 90+1'	Report (pt)		Stadium: Arena do Jacaré; Attendance: 5,753; Referee: André Luiz de Freitas Castro

12 June 5	Santos	1–0	Atlético Mineiro	Santos
19:30 UTC−03:00	Cícero 3'	Report		Stadium: Estádio Vila Belmiro; Attendance: 4,178; Referee: Márcio Chagas da Silva

7 July 6	Atlético Mineiro	3–2	Criciúma	Belo Horizonte
18:30 UTC−03:00	Rosinei 11'; Alecsandro 47'; Leleu 82'	Report	Luan 26' (o.g.); Wellington Paulista 90+2'	Stadium: Estádio Independência; Attendance: 4,815; Referee: Anderson Daronco

14 July 7	Corinthians	0–1	Atlético Mineiro	São Paulo
16:00 UTC−03:00		Report (pt)	Rosinei 36'	Stadium: Estádio do Pacaembu; Referee: Wilton Pereira Sampaio

28 July 9	Cruzeiro	4–1	Atlético Mineiro	Belo Horizonte
16:00 UTC−03:00	Everton Ribeiro 32'; Ricardo Goulart 44', 58'; Nílton 53'	Report (pt)	Alecsandro 18' (pen.)	Stadium: Mineirão; Referee: Emerson De Almeida Ferreira

31 July 10	Atlético Mineiro	1–2	Atlético Paranaense	Belo Horizonte
19:30 UTC−03:00	Bernard 80'	Report (pt)	Everton 85'; Éderson 87'	Stadium: Estádio Independência; Referee: Paulo Cesar de Oliveira

4 August 11	Flamengo	3–0	Atlético Mineiro	Brasília
16:00 UTC−03:00	Nixon 8'; Elias 14'; Paulinho 75'	Summary	Alecsandro (yellow card) 90+2'	Stadium: Estádio Nacional Mané Garrincha; Attendance: 31,548; Referee: Leandro Pedro Vuaden

7 August 12	Atlético Mineiro	2–2	Botafogo	Belo Horizonte
21:50 UTC−03:00	Luan (yellow card) 17' (goal) 90+4'; Pierre (yellow card) 22'; Ronaldinho 29'; Josué (yellow card) 36'	Summary	Elias 15'; Gabriel (yellow card) 24'; Lodeiro 59' (yellow card) 60'; Bolívar (yellow card) 86'; Júlio César (yellow card) 87'; Jefferson (yellow card) 89'	Stadium: Estádio Independência; Attendance: 11,332; Referee: Raphael Claus

10 August 13	Náutico	0–0	Atlético Mineiro	Recife
18:30 UTC−03:00				Stadium: Arena Pernambuco

14 August 14	Atlético Mineiro	2–0	Bahia	Belo Horizonte
19:30 UTC−03:00				Stadium: Estádio Independência

18 August 15	Internacional	0–0	Atlético Mineiro	Novo Hamburgo
18:30 UTC−03:00				Stadium: Estádio do Vale

25 August 16	Atlético Mineiro	2–1	Portuguesa	Belo Horizonte
16:00 UTC−03:00				Stadium: Estádio Independência

31 August 17	Goiás	0–0	Atlético Mineiro	Goiânia
18:30 UTC−03:00				Stadium: Serra Dourada

4 September 18	Atlético Mineiro	2–2	Fluminense	Belo Horizonte
21:50 UTC−03:00				Stadium: Estádio Independência

7 September 19	Vitória	1–1	Atlético Mineiro	Salvador
18:30 UTC−03:00				Stadium: Barradão

12 September 20	Atlético Mineiro	3–0	Coritiba	Belo Horizonte
21:00 UTC−03:00				Stadium: Estádio Independência

15 September 21	Grêmio	0–1	Atlético Mineiro	Porto Alegre
18:30 UTC−03:00				Stadium: Arena do Grêmio

18 September 22	São Paulo	1–0	Atlético Mineiro	São Paulo
21:50 UTC−03:00				Stadium: Morumbi

22 September 23	Atlético Mineiro	2–1	Vasco da Gama	Belo Horizonte
18:30 UTC−03:00				Stadium: Estádio Independência

25 September 25	Criciúma	1–1	Atlético Mineiro	Criciúma
19:30 UTC−03:00				Stadium: Heriberto Hülse

29 September 24	Atlético Mineiro	3–1	Santos	Belo Horizonte
18:30 UTC−03:00				Stadium: Estádio Independência

3 October 8	Atlético Mineiro	4–0	Ponte Preta	Belo Horizonte
19:30 UTC−03:00				Stadium: Estádio Independência

6 October 26	Atlético Mineiro	0–0	Corinthians	Belo Horizonte
16:00 UTC−03:00				Stadium: Estádio Independência

9 October 27	Ponte Preta	2–0	Atlético Mineiro	Campinas
21:00 UTC−03:00				Stadium: Moisés Lucarelli

13 October 28	Atlético Mineiro	1–0	Cruzeiro	Belo Horizonte
16:00 UTC−03:00				Stadium: Estádio Independência

16 October 29	Atlético Paranaense	1–0	Atlético Mineiro	Curitiba
21:50 UTC−03:00				Stadium: Vila Capanema

20 October 30	Atlético Mineiro	1–0	Flamengo	Belo Horizonte
16:00 UTC−03:00				Stadium: Estádio Independência

26 October 31	Botafogo	1–0	Atlético Mineiro	Rio de Janeiro
18:30 UTC−03:00				Stadium: Maracanã

2 November 32	Atlético Mineiro	5–0	Náutico	Belo Horizonte
21:00 UTC−03:00				Stadium: Estádio Independência

9 November 33	Bahia	0–0	Atlético Mineiro	Salvador
19:30 UTC−03:00				Stadium: Fonte Nova

14 November 34	Atlético Mineiro	2–1	Internacional	Belo Horizonte
21:00 UTC−03:00				Stadium: Estádio Independência

17 November 35	Portuguesa	2–0	Atlético Mineiro	São Paulo
19:30 UTC−03:00				Stadium: Canindé

23 November 36	Atlético Mineiro	4–1	Goiás	Belo Horizonte
21:00 UTC−03:00				Stadium: Estádio Independência

30 November 37	Fluminense	2–2	Atlético Mineiro	Rio de Janeiro
19:30 UTC−03:00				Stadium: Maracanã

8 December 38	Atlético Mineiro	2–2	Vitória	Belo Horizonte
17:00 UTC−03:00				Stadium: Estádio Independência

=== Copa do Brasil ===
==== Round of 16 ====
22 August First leg	Botafogo	4–2	Atlético Mineiro	Rio de Janeiro
21:50 UTC−03:00				Stadium: Maracanã

28 August Second leg	Atlético Mineiro	2–2 (4–6 agg.)	Botafogo	Belo Horizonte
19:30 UTC−03:00				Stadium: Estádio Independência

=== FIFA Club World Cup ===
==== Semi-final ====
18 December Semi-final	Raja Casablanca (Morocco)	3–1	(Brazil) Atlético Mineiro	Marrakesh, Morocco
17:30 UTC−03:00	Iajour 51'; Moutouali 84' (pen.); Mabidé 90+4'	Report	Ronaldinho 63'	Stadium: Stade de Marrakech; Attendance: 35,219; Referee: Carlos Velasco Carballo (Spain)

==== Third Place ====
21 December Third Place	Guangzhou Evergrande (China)	2–3	(Brazil) Atlético Mineiro	Marrakesh, Morocco
14:30 UTC−03:00	Muriqui 9'; Conca 15' (pen.)	Report	Diego Tardelli 2'; Ronaldinho 45+1'; Luan 90+1'	Stadium: Stade de Marrakech; Attendance: 37,774; Referee: Alireza Faghani (Iran)
