= 2013 Copa Libertadores finals =

2013 Copa Libertadores de América finals
- Event: 2013 Copa Libertadores de América
Olimpia	Atlético Mineiro
(Paraguay)	(Brazil)
2	2
- on aggregate Atlético Mineiro won 4–3 on penalties

First leg
Olimpia	Atlético Mineiro
2	0
- Date: 17 July 2013
- Venue: Estadio Defensores del Chaco, Asunción
- Referee: Néstor Pitana (Argentina)
- Attendance: 35,000

Second leg
Atlético Mineiro	Olimpia
2	0
- After extra time
- Date: 24 July 2013
- Venue: Estádio Governador Magalhães Pinto (Mineirão), Belo Horizonte
- Referee: Wilmar Roldán (Colombia)
- Attendance: 56,557

The 2013 Copa Libertadores de América finals were the final two-legged tie that decided the winner of the 2013 Copa Libertadores de América, the 54th edition of the Copa Libertadores de América, South America's premier international club football tournament organized by CONMEBOL.

The finals were contested in two-legged home-and-away format between Paraguayan team Olimpia and Brazilian team Atlético Mineiro. The first leg was hosted by Olimpia at Estadio Defensores del Chaco in Asunción on 17 July 2013, while the second leg was hosted by Atlético Mineiro at Estádio Governador Magalhães Pinto (Mineirão) in Belo Horizonte on 24 July. The winner earned the right to represent CONMEBOL at the 2013 FIFA Club World Cup, entering at the semifinal stage, and the right to play against the 2013 Copa Sudamericana winners in the 2014 Recopa Sudamericana.

Olimpia won the first leg 2–0, and Atlético Mineiro won the second leg by the same score after extra time, which meant the title was decided by a penalty shoot-out, which Atlético Mineiro won 4–3 to claim their first Copa Libertadores title.

== Qualified teams ==
Team	Previous finals appearances (bold indicates winners)
(Paraguay) Olimpia	1960, **1979**, 1989, **1990**, 1991, **2002**
(Brazil) Atlético Mineiro	None

Atlético Mineiro came into the finals as a first-time finalist, while Olimpia were three-time champion and three-time runner-up, and the first and only club to be a finalist in each decade of the tournament's existence.

== Venues ==
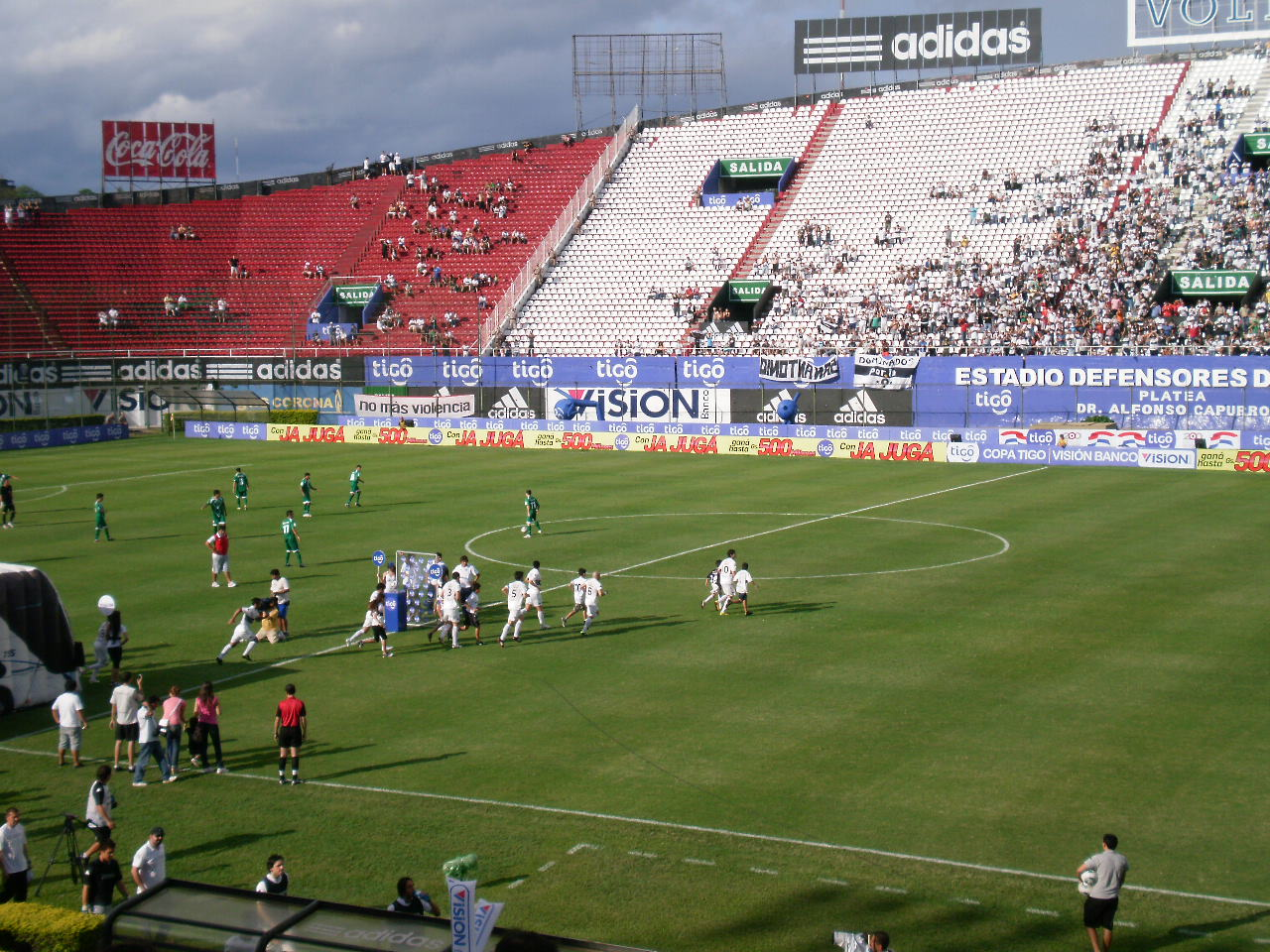
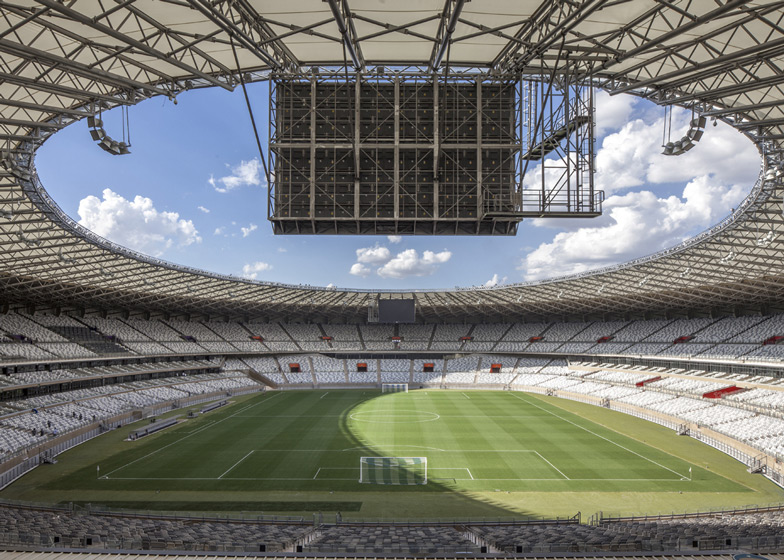
Estadio Defensores del Chaco (left) and Estadio Mineirao, venues for the series

== Road to the finals ==
Note: In all scores below, the score of the home team is given first.

(Paraguay) Olimpia			Round	(Brazil) Atlético Mineiro		
Opponent	Venue	Score		Opponent	Venue	Score
(Uruguay) Defensor Sporting (won 2–0 on aggregate)	Away	0–0	First stage	Bye		
(Uruguay) Defensor Sporting (won 2–0 on aggregate)	Home	2–0	First stage	Bye		
**Group 7**			Second stage	**Group 3**		
(Argentina) Newell's Old Boys	Away	3–1	Second stage	(Brazil) São Paulo	Home	2–1
Universidad de Chile	Home	3–0	Second stage	(Argentina) Arsenal	Away	2–5
(Venezuela) Deportivo Lara	Home	2–2	Second stage	(Bolivia) The Strongest	Home	2–1
(Venezuela) Deportivo Lara	Away	1–5	Second stage	(Bolivia) The Strongest	Away	1–2
Universidad de Chile	Away	0–1	Second stage	(Argentina) Arsenal	Home	5–2
(Argentina) Newell's Old Boys	Home	4–1	Second stage	(Brazil) São Paulo	Away	2–0
Pos / Team / Pld / W / D / L / GF / GA / GD / Pts; **1** / (Paraguay) Olimpia (A) / **6** / **4** / **1** / **1** / **16** / **7** / **+9** / **13**; 2 / (Argentina) Newell's Old Boys (A) / 6 / 3 / 0 / 3 / 11 / 10 / +1 / **9**; 3 / Universidad de Chile / 6 / 3 / 0 / 3 / 7 / 9 / −2 / **9**; 4 / (Venezuela) Deportivo Lara / 6 / 1 / 1 / 4 / 8 / 16 / −8 / **4**; Source: RSSSF (A) Advanced to the round of 16			Second stage	Pos / Team / Pld / W / D / L / GF / GA / GD / Pts; **1** / (Brazil) Atlético Mineiro (A) / **6** / **5** / **0** / **1** / **16** / **9** / **+7** / **15**; 2 / (Brazil) São Paulo (A) / 6 / 2 / 1 / 3 / 8 / 8 / 0 / **7**; 3 / (Argentina) Arsenal / 6 / 2 / 1 / 3 / 10 / 15 / −5 / **7**; 4 / (Bolivia) The Strongest / 6 / 2 / 0 / 4 / 8 / 10 / −2 / **6**; Source: RSSSF (A) Advanced to the round of 16		
**Seed 3**			Knockout stages	**Seed 1**		
(Argentina) Tigre (won 3–2 on aggregate)	Away	2–1	Round of 16	(Brazil) São Paulo (won 6–2 on aggregate)	Away	1–2
(Argentina) Tigre (won 3–2 on aggregate)	Home	2–0	Round of 16	(Brazil) São Paulo (won 6–2 on aggregate)	Home	4–1
(Brazil) Fluminense (won 2–1 on aggregate)	Away	0–0	Quarterfinals	(Mexico) Tijuana (tied 3–3 on aggregate, won on away goals)	Away	2–2
(Brazil) Fluminense (won 2–1 on aggregate)	Home	2–1	Quarterfinals	(Mexico) Tijuana (tied 3–3 on aggregate, won on away goals)	Home	1–1
(Colombia) Santa Fe (won 2–1 on aggregate)	Home	2–0	Semifinals	(Argentina) Newell's Old Boys (tied 2–2 on aggregate, won on penalties)	Away	2–0
(Colombia) Santa Fe (won 2–1 on aggregate)	Away	1–0	Semifinals	(Argentina) Newell's Old Boys (tied 2–2 on aggregate, won on penalties)	Home	2–0 (3–2 p)

== Format ==
The finals were played on a home-and-away two-legged basis, with the higher-seeded team hosting the second leg. However, CONMEBOL required that the second leg of the finals be played in South America, i.e., a finalist from Mexico had to host the first leg regardless of seeding. If tied on aggregate, the away goals rule was not used, and 30 minutes of extra time were played. If still tied after extra time, a penalty shoot-out was used to determine the winner.

== Match details ==
=== First leg ===
Alejandro Silva opened the scoring in the 23rd minute when he picked up a pass near the right wing and set off on a run towards goal before hitting a low left-footed strike from just outside the box giving the goalkeeper no chance. Wilson Pittoni got the second goal in the fourth minute of stoppage time when he curled a right footed free-kick past the goalkeeper who was hampered by his own defender in his way on the line.

2013 Copa Libertadores finals
17 July 2013
20:50 UTC−4
First leg

Olimpia (Paraguay)	2–0	(Brazil) Atlético Mineiro
A. Silva 23'; Pittoni 90+4'	Report

Estadio Defensores del Chaco, Asunción
Attendance: 40,000
Referee: Néstor Pitana (Argentina)

**Olimpia**	**Atlético Mineiro**

GK	1	(Uruguay) Martín Silva
DF	19	(Paraguay) Salustiano Candia (c)
DF	5	(Paraguay) Julio Manzur
DF	15	(Paraguay) Herminio Miranda	(yellow card) 19'
MF	17	(Argentina) Nelson Benítez
MF	8	(Paraguay) Wilson Pittoni	(yellow card) 90+6'
MF	3	(Uruguay) Alejandro Silva	(yellow card) 24'
MF	14	(Paraguay) Eduardo Aranda
MF	4	(Argentina) Matías Giménez	(yellow card) 9'	(substituted off) 46'
FW	16	(Paraguay) Fredy Bareiro		(substituted off) 90'
FW	10	(Uruguay) Juan Manuel Salgueiro		(substituted off) 89'
Substitutes:
GK	25	(Paraguay) Blas Hermosilla
DF	24	(Paraguay) Ricardo Mazacotte
DF	6	(Paraguay) Enrique Gabriel Meza
MF	13	(Paraguay) Carlos Humberto Paredes		(substituted on) 89'
MF	23	(Paraguay) Jorge Báez
FW	7	(Paraguay) Enzo Prono		(substituted on) 90'
FW	9	(Argentina) Juan Carlos Ferreyra		(substituted on) 46'
Manager:
(Paraguay) Ever Hugo Almeida

GK	1	(Brazil) Victor
DF	2	(Brazil) Marcos Rocha	(yellow card) 81'
DF	4	(Brazil) Réver (c)
DF	3	(Brazil) Leonardo Silva
DF	20	(Brazil) Richarlyson	(yellow card) 45+1' (yellow-red card) 90'
MF	5	(Brazil) Pierre
MF	28	(Brazil) Josué	(yellow card) 43'
FW	9	(Brazil) Diego Tardelli
MF	10	(Brazil) Ronaldinho		(substituted off) 65'
FW	27	(Brazil) Luan		(substituted off) 64'
FW	7	(Brazil) Jô		(substituted off) 80'
Substitutes:
GK	12	(Brazil) Giovanni
DF	15	(Brazil) Gilberto Silva
DF	6	(Brazil) Júnior César
DF	29	(Brazil) Michel
MF	18	(Brazil) Rosinei		(substituted on) 64'
FW	19	(Brazil) Alecsandro		(substituted on) 80'
FW	17	(Brazil) Guilherme		(substituted on) 65'
Manager:
(Brazil) Cuca

Assistant referees:
Hernán Maidana (Argentina)
Juan Pablo Belatti (Argentina)
Fourth official:
Germán Delfino (Argentina)

=== Second leg ===
Jô opened the scoring in the 46th minute when he took struck the ball on the turn past goalkeeper Martín Silva. In the 85th minute Atlético Mineiro got their second when Leonardo Silva headed Bernard's cross into the top corner of the net. There were no goals in extra time, and in the penalty shoot-out Olimpia's Herminio Miranda missed the first kick, and Matías Giménez shot against the bar in the fifth kick, to hand Atlético Mineiro the title to for the first time and a berth in the 2013 FIFA Club World Cup.

24 July 2013
21:50 UTC−3
Second leg

Atlético Mineiro (Brazil)	2–0 (a.e.t.)	(Paraguay) Olimpia
Jô 47'; Leonardo Silva 87'	Report
Penalties
Alecsandro (penalty scored); Guilherme (penalty scored); Jô (penalty scored); Leonardo Silva (penalty scored)	4–3	(penalty missed) Miranda; (penalty scored) Ferreyra; (penalty scored) Candia; (penalty scored) Aranda; (penalty missed) Giménez

Mineirão, Belo Horizonte
Attendance: 56,557
Referee: Wilmar Roldán (Colombia)

**Atlético Mineiro**	**Olimpia**

GK	1	(Brazil) Victor
DF	29	(Brazil) Michel		(substituted off) 72'
DF	3	(Brazil) Leonardo Silva
DF	4	(Brazil) Réver (c)
DF	6	(Brazil) Júnior César
MF	28	(Brazil) Josué
MF	5	(Brazil) Pierre		(substituted off) 46'
MF	10	(Brazil) Ronaldinho
FW	11	(Brazil) Bernard	(yellow card) 22'
FW	9	(Brazil) Diego Tardelli		(substituted off) 80'
FW	7	(Brazil) Jô
Substitutes:
GK	12	(Brazil) Giovanni
DF	15	(Brazil) Gilberto Silva
MF	18	(Brazil) Rosinei		(substituted on) 46'
MF	8	(Brazil) Leandro Donizete
FW	19	(Brazil) Alecsandro		(substituted on) 72'
FW	17	(Brazil) Guilherme		(substituted on) 80'
FW	27	(Brazil) Luan	(yellow card) 109'
Manager:
(Brazil) Cuca

GK	1	(Uruguay) Martín Silva	(yellow card) 84'
DF	24	(Paraguay) Ricardo Mazacotte
DF	15	(Paraguay) Herminio Miranda
DF	5	(Paraguay) Julio Manzur	(yellow card) 58' (yellow-red card) 85'
DF	19	(Paraguay) Salustiano Candia (c)
DF	17	(Argentina) Nelson Benítez	(yellow card) 22'
MF	8	(Paraguay) Wilson Pittoni
MF	14	(Paraguay) Eduardo Aranda
MF	3	(Uruguay) Alejandro Silva		(substituted off) 71'
FW	10	(Uruguay) Juan Manuel Salgueiro	(yellow card) 72'	(substituted off) 83'
FW	16	(Paraguay) Fredy Bareiro		(substituted off) 46'
Substitutes:
GK	25	(Paraguay) Blas Hermosilla
DF	6	(Paraguay) Enrique Gabriel Meza
MF	13	(Paraguay) Carlos Humberto Paredes
MF	4	(Argentina) Matías Giménez	(yellow card) 105'	(substituted on) 71'
MF	23	(Paraguay) Jorge Báez		(substituted on) 83'
FW	9	(Argentina) Juan Carlos Ferreyra	(yellow card) 89'	(substituted on) 46'
FW	11	(Paraguay) Arnaldo Castorino
Manager:
(Paraguay) Ever Hugo Almeida

Assistant referees:
Humberto Clavijo (Colombia)
Eduardo Ruiz (Colombia)
Fourth official:
Imer Machado (Colombia)

== See also ==
- 2013 Copa Libertadores Femenina final
- 2013 Copa Sudamericana finals
