= 2013 Copa Libertadores knockout stage =

The knockout stage of the 2013 Copa Libertadores de América was played from April 24 to July 24, 2013. A total of 16 teams competed in the knockout stage.

== Qualified teams ==
The winners and runners-up of each of the eight groups in the second stage qualified for the knockout stage.

Group	Winners	Runners-up
1	(Uruguay) Nacional	(Argentina) Boca Juniors
2	(Brazil) Palmeiras	(Argentina) Tigre
3	(Brazil) Atlético Mineiro	(Brazil) São Paulo
4	(Argentina) Vélez Sarsfield	(Ecuador) Emelec
5	(Brazil) Corinthians	(Mexico) Tijuana
6	(Colombia) Santa Fe	(Peru) Real Garcilaso
7	(Paraguay) Olimpia	(Argentina) Newell's Old Boys
8	(Brazil) Fluminense	(Brazil) Grêmio

== Seeding ==
The qualified teams were seeded in the knockout stage according to their results in the second stage, with the group winners seeded 1–8, and the group runners-up seeded 9–16.

Seed	Team	Pld	W	D	L	GF	GA	GD	Pts	Status
1	(Brazil) Atlético Mineiro	6	5	0	1	16	9	+7	15	Group winners (Seeds 1–8)
2	(Colombia) Santa Fe	6	4	2	0	9	4	+5	14	Group winners (Seeds 1–8)
3	(Paraguay) Olimpia	6	4	1	1	16	7	+9	13	Group winners (Seeds 1–8)
4	(Brazil) Corinthians	6	4	1	1	10	2	+8	13	Group winners (Seeds 1–8)
5	(Argentina) Vélez Sarsfield	6	4	1	1	10	3	+7	13	Group winners (Seeds 1–8)
6	(Brazil) Fluminense	6	3	2	1	5	5	0	11	Group winners (Seeds 1–8)
7	(Uruguay) Nacional	6	3	1	2	10	6	+4	10	Group winners (Seeds 1–8)
8	(Brazil) Palmeiras	6	3	0	3	5	5	0	9	Group winners (Seeds 1–8)
9	(Mexico) Tijuana	6	4	1	1	8	4	+4	13	Group runners-up (Seeds 9–16)
10	(Peru) Real Garcilaso	6	3	1	2	8	7	+1	10	Group runners-up (Seeds 9–16)
11	(Ecuador) Emelec	6	3	1	2	5	4	+1	10	Group runners-up (Seeds 9–16)
12	(Argentina) Newell's Old Boys	6	3	0	3	11	10	+1	9	Group runners-up (Seeds 9–16)
13	(Argentina) Boca Juniors	6	3	0	3	7	7	0	9	Group runners-up (Seeds 9–16)
14	(Argentina) Tigre	6	3	0	3	9	10	−1	9	Group runners-up (Seeds 9–16)
15	(Brazil) Grêmio	6	2	2	2	10	6	+4	8	Group runners-up (Seeds 9–16)
16	(Brazil) São Paulo	6	2	1	3	8	8	0	7	Group runners-up (Seeds 9–16)

Rules for classification: 1. Higher position in group; 2. Points; 3. Goal difference; 4. Goals scored; 5. Away goals scored; 6. Drawing of lots.

== Format ==
In the knockout stage, the 16 teams played a single-elimination tournament, with the following rules:

- Each tie was played on a home-and-away two-legged basis, with the higher-seeded team hosting the second leg. However, CONMEBOL required that the second leg of the finals be played in South America, i.e., a finalist from Mexico had to host the first leg regardless of seeding.
- In the round of 16, quarterfinals, and semifinals, if tied on aggregate, the away goals rule was used. If still tied, a penalty shoot-out was used to determine the winner (no extra time was played).
- In the finals, if tied on aggregate, the away goals rule was not used, and 30 minutes of extra time were played. If still tied after extra time, a penalty shoot-out was used to determine the winner.
- If there were two semifinalists from the same association, they had to play each other.

== Bracket ==
The bracket of the knockout stage was determined by the seeding as follows:

- Round of 16:
  - Match A: Seed 1 vs. Seed 16
  - Match B: Seed 2 vs. Seed 15
  - Match C: Seed 3 vs. Seed 14
  - Match D: Seed 4 vs. Seed 13
  - Match E: Seed 5 vs. Seed 12
  - Match F: Seed 6 vs. Seed 11
  - Match G: Seed 7 vs. Seed 10
  - Match H: Seed 8 vs. Seed 9
- Quarterfinals:
  - Match S1: Winner A vs. Winner H
  - Match S2: Winner B vs. Winner G
  - Match S3: Winner C vs. Winner F
  - Match S4: Winner D vs. Winner E
- Semifinals: (if there were two semifinalists from the same association, they must play each other)
  - Match F1: Winner S1 vs. Winner S4
  - Match F2: Winner S2 vs. Winner S3
- Finals: Winner F1 vs. Winner F2

Round of 16
11	(Ecuador) Emelec	2	0	2
6	(Brazil) Fluminense	1	2	3
14	(Argentina) Tigre	2	0	2
3	(Paraguay) Olimpia	1	2	3
10	(Peru) Real Garcilaso (p)	1	0	1 (4)
7	(Uruguay) Nacional	0	1	1 (1)
15	(Brazil) Grêmio	2	0	2
2	(Colombia) Santa Fe (a)	1	1	2
13	(Argentina) Boca Juniors	1	1	2
4	(Brazil) Corinthians	0	1	1
12	(Argentina) Newell's Old Boys (a)	0	2	2
5	(Argentina) Vélez Sarsfield	1	1	2
9	(Mexico) Tijuana	0	2	2
8	(Brazil) Palmeiras	0	1	1
16	(Brazil) São Paulo	1	1	2
1	(Brazil) Atlético Mineiro	2	4	6

Quarterfinals
6	(Brazil) Fluminense	0	1	1
3	(Paraguay) Olimpia	0	2	2
10	(Peru) Real Garcilaso	1	0	1
2	(Colombia) Santa Fe	3	2	5
13	(Argentina) Boca Juniors	0	0	0 (9)
12	(Argentina) Newell's Old Boys (p)	0	0	0 (10)
9	(Mexico) Tijuana	2	1	3
1	(Brazil) Atlético Mineiro (a)	2	1	3

Semifinals
3	(Paraguay) Olimpia	2	0	2
2	(Colombia) Santa Fe	0	1	1
12	(Argentina) Newell's Old Boys	2	0	2 (2)
1	(Brazil) Atlético Mineiro (p)	0	2	2 (3)

Finals
3	(Paraguay) Olimpia	2	0	2 (3)
1	(Brazil) Atlético Mineiro (p)	0	2	2 (4)

== Round of 16 ==
The first legs were played on April 24–25 and April 30–May 2, and the second legs were played on May 8–9 and 14–16, 2013.

Team 1	Agg.	Team 2	1st leg	2nd leg
São Paulo (Brazil)	2–6	(Brazil) Atlético Mineiro	1–2	1–4
Grêmio (Brazil)	2–2 (a)	(Colombia) Santa Fe	2–1	0–1
Tigre (Argentina)	2–3	(Paraguay) Olimpia	2–1	0–2
Boca Juniors (Argentina)	2–1	(Brazil) Corinthians	1–0	1–1
Newell's Old Boys (Argentina)	2–2 (a)	(Argentina) Vélez Sarsfield	0–1	2–1
Emelec (Ecuador)	2–3	(Brazil) Fluminense	2–1	0–2
Real Garcilaso (Peru)	1–1 (4–1 p)	(Uruguay) Nacional	1–0	0–1
Tijuana (Mexico)	2–1	(Brazil) Palmeiras	0–0	2–1

=== Match A ===
May 2, 2013
20:15 UTC−3

São Paulo (Brazil)	1–2	(Brazil) Atlético Mineiro
Jádson 9'	Report	Ronaldinho 43'; Diego Tardelli 61'

Estádio Cícero Pompeu de Toledo (Morumbi), São Paulo
Attendance: 43,573
Referee: Antonio Arias (Paraguay)

May 8, 2013
22:00 UTC−3

Atlético Mineiro (Brazil)	4–1	(Brazil) São Paulo
Jô 18', 59', 66'; Diego Tardelli 61'	Report	Luís Fabiano 73'

Estádio Raimundo Sampaio (Independência), Belo Horizonte
Attendance: 23,157
Referee: Roberto Silvera (Uruguay)

Atlético Mineiro won 6–2 on aggregate.

=== Match B ===
May 1, 2013
19:30 UTC−3

Grêmio (Brazil)	2–1	(Colombia) Santa Fe
Vargas 28'; Fernando 81'	Report	Pérez 55' (pen.)

Arena do Grêmio, Porto Alegre
Attendance: 35,182
Referee: Patricio Loustau (Argentina)

May 16, 2013
20:30 UTC−5

Santa Fe (Colombia)	1–0	(Brazil) Grêmio
Medina 80'	Report

Estadio Nemesio Camacho (El Campín), Bogotá
Attendance: 37,213
Referee: Roberto Silvera (Uruguay)

Tied 2–2 on aggregate, Santa Fe won on away goals.

=== Match C ===
April 30, 2013
20:15 UTC−3

Tigre (Argentina)	2–1	(Paraguay) Olimpia
Peñalba 27'; Pérez García 64'	Report	Miranda 78'

Estadio José Dellagiovanna, Victoria
Attendance: 12,407
Referee: Omar Ponce (Ecuador)

May 16, 2013
19:00 UTC−4

Olimpia (Paraguay)	2–0	(Argentina) Tigre
Bareiro 52'; Ortiz 65'	Report

Estadio Defensores del Chaco, Asunción
Attendance: 30,706
Referee: Darío Ubriaco (Uruguay)

Olimpia won 3–2 on aggregate.

=== Match D ===
May 1, 2013
21:50 UTC−3

Boca Juniors (Argentina)	1–0	(Brazil) Corinthians
Blandi 59'	Report

Estadio Alberto J. Armando (La Bombonera), Buenos Aires
Attendance: 40,518
Referee: Enrique Osses (Chile)

May 15, 2013
22:00 UTC−3

Corinthians (Brazil)	1–1	(Argentina) Boca Juniors
Paulinho 51'	Report	Riquelme 26'

Estádio Municipal Paulo Machado de Carvalho (Pacaembu), São Paulo
Attendance: 38,435
Referee: Carlos Amarilla (Paraguay)

Boca Juniors won 2–1 on aggregate.

=== Match E ===
April 24, 2013
21:15 UTC−3

Newell's Old Boys (Argentina)	0–1	(Argentina) Vélez Sarsfield
	Report	Allione 63'

Estadio Marcelo Bielsa, Rosario
Attendance: 41,572
Referee: Diego Abal (Argentina)

May 15, 2013
19:15 UTC−3

Vélez Sarsfield (Argentina)	1–2	(Argentina) Newell's Old Boys
Ferreyra 83'	Report	Casco 4'; Scocco 41'

Estadio José Amalfitani, Buenos Aires
Attendance: 37,850
Referee: Néstor Pitana (Argentina)

Tied 2–2 on aggregate, Newell's Old Boys won on away goals.

=== Match F ===
May 2, 2013
20:30 UTC−5

Emelec (Ecuador)	2–1	(Brazil) Fluminense
Leandro Euzébio 33' (o.g.); Gaibor 87' (pen.)	Report	Wágner 44'

Estadio George Capwell, Guayaquil
Attendance: 22,480
Referee: Wilmar Roldán (Colombia)

May 8, 2013
22:00 UTC−3

Fluminense (Brazil)	2–0	(Ecuador) Emelec
Fred 29'; Carlinhos 86'	Report

Estádio São Januário, Rio de Janeiro
Attendance: 17,150
Referee: Víctor Carrillo (Peru)

Fluminense won 3–2 on aggregate.

=== Match G ===
April 25, 2013
20:15 UTC−5

Real Garcilaso (Peru)	1–0	(Uruguay) Nacional
Bogado 36'	Report

Estadio Garcilaso, Cusco
Attendance: 23,418
Referee: Marcelo Henrique (Brazil)

May 9, 2013
21:15 UTC−3

Nacional (Uruguay)	1–0	(Peru) Real Garcilaso
Bueno 56'	Report
Penalties
Recoba (penalty missed); Romero (penalty scored); Arismendi (penalty missed)	1–4	(penalty scored) Ramos; (penalty scored) Ferreira; (penalty scored) Vildoso; (penalty scored) Gamarra

Estadio Centenario, Montevideo
Attendance: 35,180
Referee: Carlos Amarilla (Paraguay)

Tied 1–1 on aggregate, Real Garcilaso won on penalties.

=== Match H ===
April 30, 2013
18:30 UTC−7

Tijuana (Mexico)	0–0	(Brazil) Palmeiras
	Report

Estadio Caliente, Tijuana
Attendance: 16,519
Referee: Martín Vázquez (Uruguay)

May 14, 2013
22:00 UTC−3

Palmeiras (Brazil)	1–2	(Mexico) Tijuana
Souza 62' (pen.)	Report	Riascos 27'; Arce 52'

Estádio Municipal Paulo Machado de Carvalho (Pacaembu), São Paulo
Attendance: 36,462
Referee: Juan Soto (Venezuela)

Tijuana won 2–1 on aggregate.

== Quarterfinals ==
The first legs were played on May 22–23, and the second legs were played on May 28–30, 2013.

Team 1	Agg.	Team 2	1st leg	2nd leg
Tijuana (Mexico)	3–3 (a)	(Brazil) Atlético Mineiro	2–2	1–1
Real Garcilaso (Peru)	1–5	(Colombia) Santa Fe	1–3	0–2
Fluminense (Brazil)	1–2	(Paraguay) Olimpia	0–0	1–2
Boca Juniors (Argentina)	0–0 (9–10 p)	(Argentina) Newell's Old Boys	0–0	0–0

=== Match S1 ===
May 23, 2013
17:30 UTC−7

Tijuana (Mexico)	2–2	(Brazil) Atlético Mineiro
Riascos 33'; F. Martínez 54'	Report	Diego Tardelli 67'; Luan 90+3'

Estadio Caliente, Tijuana
Attendance: 23,412
Referee: Hernando Buitrago (Colombia)

May 30, 2013
22:00 UTC−3

Atlético Mineiro (Brazil)	1–1	(Mexico) Tijuana
Réver 41'	Report	Riascos 26'

Estádio Raimundo Sampaio (Independência), Belo Horizonte
Attendance: 23,701
Referee: Patricio Polic (Chile)

Tied 3–3 on aggregate, Atlético Mineiro won on away goals.

=== Match S2 ===
May 22, 2013
17:45 UTC−5

Real Garcilaso (Peru)	1–3	(Colombia) Santa Fe
Ramúa 64'	Report	Meza 20'; Medina 23'; Cuero 54'

Estadio Garcilaso, Cusco
Attendance: 35,213
Referee: Leandro Vuaden (Brazil)

May 28, 2013
20:00 UTC−5

Santa Fe (Colombia)	2–0	(Peru) Real Garcilaso
Cuero 7'; Valencia 66'	Report

Estadio Nemesio Camacho (El Campín), Bogotá
Attendance: 42,561
Referee: Diego Lara (Ecuador)

Santa Fe won 5–1 on aggregate.

=== Match S3 ===
May 22, 2013
22:00 UTC−3

Fluminense (Brazil)	0–0	(Paraguay) Olimpia
	Report

Estádio São Januário, Rio de Janeiro
Attendance: 16,915
Referee: Roberto Silvera (Uruguay)

May 29, 2013
21:00 UTC−4

Olimpia (Paraguay)	2–1	(Brazil) Fluminense
Salgueiro 35', 41' (pen.)	Report	Rhayner 10'

Estadio Defensores del Chaco, Asunción
Attendance: 39,609
Referee: Daniel Fedorczuk (Uruguay)

Olimpia won 2–1 on aggregate.

=== Match S4 ===
May 23, 2013
21:30 UTC−3

Boca Juniors (Argentina)	0–0	(Argentina) Newell's Old Boys
	Report

Estadio Alberto J. Armando (La Bombonera), Buenos Aires
Attendance: 45,995
Referee: Mauro Vigliano (Argentina)

May 29, 2013
19:30 UTC−3

Newell's Old Boys (Argentina)	0–0	(Argentina) Boca Juniors
	Report
Penalties
Scocco (penalty scored); Vergini (penalty scored); M. Rodríguez (penalty scored); Cáceres (penalty missed); Urruti (penalty missed); Casco (penalty scored); Tonso (penalty scored); Bernardi (penalty scored); Orzán (penalty missed); Guzmán (penalty scored); Scocco (penalty scored); Vergini (penalty scored); M. Rodríguez (penalty scored)	10–9	(penalty missed) Riquelme; (penalty scored) Pérez; (penalty scored) Martínez; (penalty scored) Somoza; (penalty missed) Caruzzo; (penalty scored) Orión; (penalty scored) R. Rodríguez; (penalty scored) Erbes; (penalty missed) Zárate; (penalty scored) Marín; (penalty scored) Riquelme; (penalty scored) Pérez; (penalty missed) Martínez

Estadio Marcelo Bielsa, Rosario
Attendance: 42,328
Referee: Germán Delfino (Argentina)

Tied 0–0 on aggregate, Newell's Old Boys won on penalties.

== Semifinals ==
The first legs were played on July 2–3, and the second legs were played on July 9–10, 2013.

Team 1	Agg.	Team 2	1st leg	2nd leg
Newell's Old Boys (Argentina)	2–2 (2–3 p)	(Brazil) Atlético Mineiro	2–0	0–2
Olimpia (Paraguay)	2–1	(Colombia) Santa Fe	2–0	0–1

=== Match F1 ===
July 3, 2013
21:50 UTC−3

Newell's Old Boys (Argentina)	2–0	(Brazil) Atlético Mineiro
M. Rodríguez 62'; Scocco 81'	Report

Estadio Marcelo Bielsa, Rosario
Attendance: 42,271
Referee: Enrique Osses (Chile)

July 10, 2013
21:50 UTC−3

Atlético Mineiro (Brazil)	2–0	(Argentina) Newell's Old Boys
Bernard 3'; Guilherme 85'	Report
Penalties
Alecsandro (penalty scored); Guilherme (penalty scored); Jô (penalty missed); Richarlyson (penalty missed); Ronaldinho (penalty scored)	3–2	(penalty scored) Scocco; (penalty scored) Vergini; (penalty missed) Casco; (penalty missed) Cruzado; (penalty missed) M. Rodríguez

Estádio Raimundo Sampaio (Independência), Belo Horizonte
Attendance: 23,050
Referee: Roberto Silvera (Uruguay)

Tied 2–2 on aggregate, Atlético Mineiro won on penalties.

=== Match F2 ===
July 2, 2013
20:50 UTC−4

Olimpia (Paraguay)	2–0	(Colombia) Santa Fe
Miranda 66' (pen.); Ferreyra 81'	Report

Estadio Defensores del Chaco, Asunción
Attendance: 34,401
Referee: Héber Lopes (Brazil)

July 9, 2013
19:50 UTC−5

Santa Fe (Colombia)	1–0	(Paraguay) Olimpia
Medina 76'	Report

Estadio Nemesio Camacho (El Campín), Bogotá
Attendance: 36,426
Referee: Martín Vázquez (Uruguay)

Olimpia won 2–1 on aggregate.

== Finals ==
The finals were played on a home-and-away two-legged basis, with the higher-seeded team hosting the second leg. The teams tied on aggregate, the away goals rule was not used, and 30 minutes of extra time were played. A penalty shoot-out was used to determine the winner.

The first leg was played on July 17, and the second leg was played on July 24, 2013.

July 17, 2013
20:50 UTC−4

Olimpia (Paraguay)	2–0	(Brazil) Atlético Mineiro
A. Silva 23'; Pittoni 90+4'	Report

Estadio Defensores del Chaco, Asunción
Attendance: 35,000
Referee: Néstor Pitana (Argentina)

July 24, 2013
21:50 UTC−3

Atlético Mineiro (Brazil)	2–0 (a.e.t.)	(Paraguay) Olimpia
Jô 47'; Leonardo Silva 87'	Report
Penalties
Alecsandro (penalty scored); Guilherme (penalty scored); Jô (penalty scored); Leonardo Silva (penalty scored)	4–3	(penalty missed) Miranda; (penalty scored) Ferreyra; (penalty scored) Candia; (penalty scored) Aranda; (penalty missed) Giménez

Estádio Governador Magalhães Pinto (Mineirão), Belo Horizonte
Attendance: 56,557
Referee: Wilmar Roldán (Colombia)

Tied 2–2 on aggregate, Atlético Mineiro won on penalties.
