= Jorge Báez =

Paraguayan footballer (born 1990)

Personal information
- Full name: Jorge Gabriel Báez Mendoza
- Date of birth: 23 October 1990 (age 36)
- Place of birth: Asunción, Paraguay
- Height: 1.74 m (5 ft 8 1/2 in)
- Position: Midfielder

Team information
- Current team: Resende

Senior career*
Years	Team	Apps	(Gls)
2009–2010	Cerro Porteño		
2011–2014	Olimpia		
2014	→ Arsenal de Sarandí (loan)		
2015	Capiatá		
2016–	Resende		
- * Club domestic league appearances and goals as of 17 April 2014

Jorge Gabriel Báez Mendoza (born 23 October 1990) is a Paraguayan football midfielder who currently plays for side Resende.

In the summer of 2014, Báez left Olimpia where he played for the four seasons. He joined Argentine Primera División side Arsenal along with compatriot Enzo Prono, signing a one-and-half-year deal.

He was hired in 2016 to Resende compete in the Campeonato Carioca.
