= Diego Rivero =

Argentine football midfielder

Personal information
- Full name: Diego Alejandro Rivero
- Date of birth: August 11, 1981 (age 45)
- Place of birth: Puerto Esperanza, Argentina
- Height: 1.63 m (5 ft 4 in)
- Position: Right winger

Team information
- Current team: Atlas

Senior career*
Years	Team	Apps	(Gls)
1998–2004	Chacarita Juniors	183	(5)
2004–2005	Pachuca	25	(2)
2005	Cruz Azul	10	(0)
2006–2010	San Lorenzo	141	(5)
2011–2014	Boca Juniors	47	(1)
2014	Argentinos Juniors	8	(1)
2015–2017	Chacarita Juniors	40	(2)
2018–2021	Chacarita Juniors	27	(0)
2022-	Atlas	2	(1)
- * Club domestic league appearances and goals as of 00:24, 26 February 2022 (UTC)

Diego Alejandro Rivero (born 11 August 1981) is an Argentine football midfielder who plays for Atlas.

== Career ==
Rivero started his career in 1998 with Chacarita Juniors in the Primera B Nacional (Argentine second division). In 1999 Chacarita were promoted to the Primera and Rivero continued to play for the club until their relegation in 2004.

Rivero then moved to Mexico to play for Pachuca (2004–2005) and later Cruz Azul (2005).

In 2005, Rivero returned to Argentina to play for San Lorenzo. In 2007, he helped the club to win the 2007 Clausura tournament.

In 2011, Rivero joined Boca Juniors, being part of a barter in which his club exchanged him for Boca's player Matías Giménez.

== Achievements ==
=== Club ===
San Lorenzo

- Primera División: 1

2007 Clausura

Boca Juniors

- Primera División: 1

2011 Apertura
