= Lelêu =

Brazilian footballer

Personal information
- Full name: Claudionor Souza de Jesus
- Date of birth: 5 March 1993 (age 33)
- Place of birth: Rio de Janeiro, Brazil
- Height: 1.71 m (5 ft 7 in)
- Position: Attacking midfielder

Team information
- Current team: Catarinense

Youth career
- 2002–2008: Vasco da Gama
- 2008–2012: Atlético Mineiro

Senior career*
Years	Team	Apps	(Gls)
2011–2018	Atlético Mineiro	14	(1)
2012	→ Paysandu (loan)	0	(0)
2014	→ Náutico (loan)	19	(1)
2015	→ Paysandu (loan)	0	(0)
2015	→ Madureira (loan)	5	(0)
2016	→ Boa (loan)	4	(0)
2017	→ Boa (loan)	0	(0)
2019–2020	Shonan Bellmare	2	(0)
2019	→ Mito HollyHock (loan)	2	(0)
2020–2021	FC Gifu	19	(1)
2022	Icasa	14	(0)
2023–	Catarinense	7	(0)
- * Club domestic league appearances and goals as of 30 September 2024

Claudionor Souza de Jesus (born March 5, 1993), nicknamed Lelêu, is a Brazilian professional footballer who plays as an attacking midfielder for Icasa.

== Career ==
=== Atlético Mineiro & Loans ===
Leleu, as he is commonly known, began his professional career in the year of 2011, playing for Atlético Mineiro. Leleu's first match was against Democrata-GV, for the Campeonato Mineiro. In the year of 2012, Leleu was borrowed for the Brazilian club Paysandu, but returned to his former club in the same year. Returning to Atlético Mineiro at Belo Horizonte for 2013, he scored his first Brasileiro Série A goal on July 7 in a 3–2 win against Criciúma.

In 2014, he is loan at Náutico in Série B where he scored 1 goal for 16 appearances. After that season and during 3 years, he is loaned at different Brazilian clubs from weaker leagues like Paysandu, Madureira and Boa.

=== Shonan Bellmare / Mito HollyHock ===
He changes country and signs at Hiratsuka for Shonan Bellmare for the 2019 season. He made his Japanese debut for the club on March 13 in a J.League Cup Group stage match against Yokohama F. Marinos where he also scored his first goal with the club to secure a 2–0 win. After another goal in J.League Cup and 2 appearances in J1 League, he is loaned at Mito HollyHock in J2 League for the rest of the season.

== Honours ==
Atlético Mineiro

- Campeonato Mineiro: 2013
- Copa Libertadores: 2013
