= Enrique Gabriel Meza =

Paraguayan footballer (born 1985)

Enrique Meza
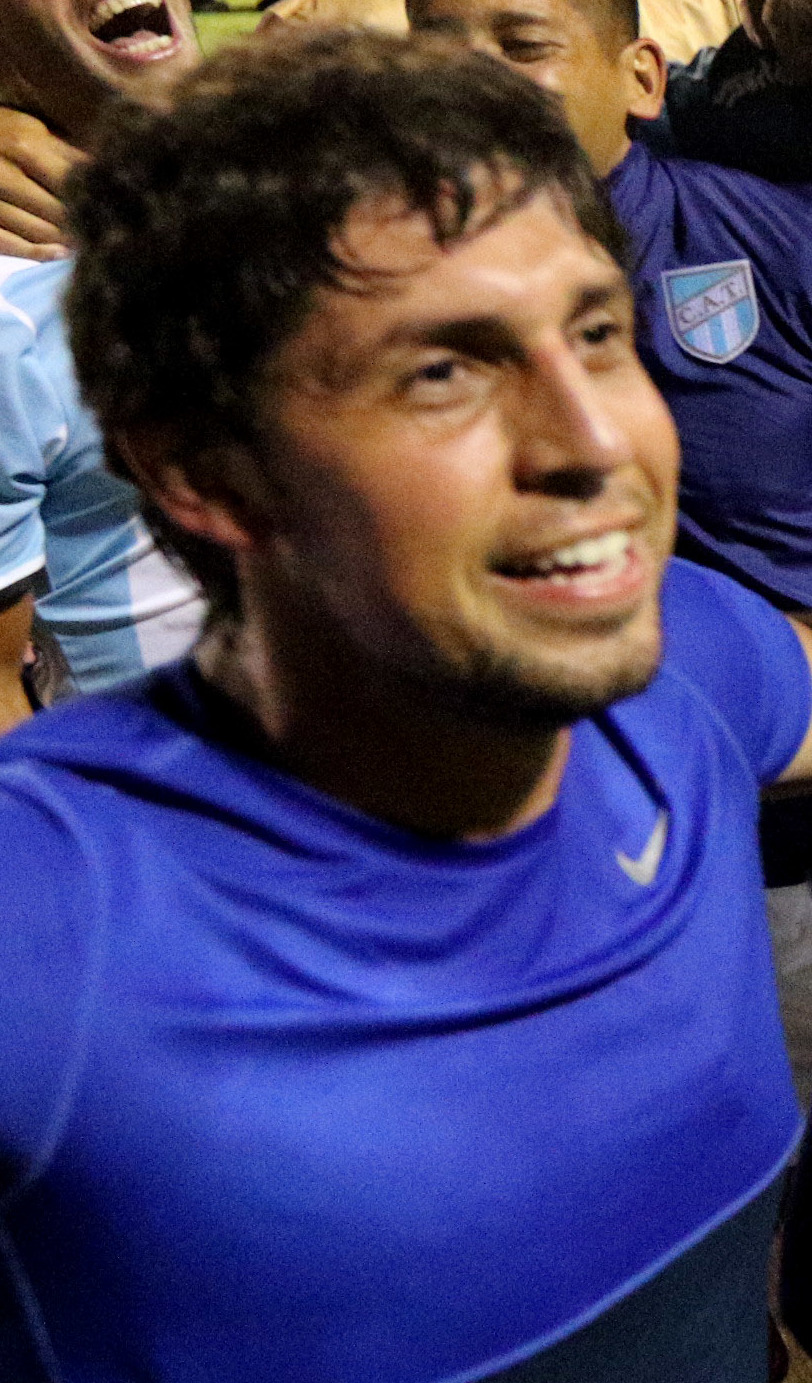

Personal information
- Full name: Enrique Gabriel Meza
- Date of birth: 28 November 1985 (age 40)
- Place of birth: Villa Elisa, Paraguay
- Height: 1.83 m (6 ft 0 in)
- Position: Defender

Team information
- Current team: Guaraní

Senior career*
Years	Team	Apps	(Gls)
2003–2004	Sol de América	46	(0)
2005–2008	Nacional	96	(3)
2008–2009	Juventud	12	(2)
2009	Dijon	0	(0)
2009–2013	Olimpia	111	(1)
2014	Sport Recife	0	(0)
2014	Chapecoense	4	(0)
2015	Sportivo Luqueño	28	(3)
2016–2017	Atlético Tucumán	14	(0)
2017	Guaraní	8	(1)
2018	Deportivo Santaní	13	(1)
2018–2019	San Lorenzo		
2020	Recoleta		
2022	3 de Noviembre		

International career
2003	Paraguay U20		
2008–2021	Paraguay	2	(0)
- * Club domestic league appearances and goals

Enrique Gabriel Meza (born 28 November 1985) is a Paraguayan former professional footballer who played as a defender.

== Career ==
Born in Villa Elisa, Meza has played club football in Paraguay, Uruguay, France and Brazil for Sol de América, Nacional, Juventud, Dijon, Olimpia, Sport Recife, Chapecoense and Sportivo Luqueño. In 2016, Meza joined Argentine Primera División side Atlético Tucumán. He made his debut on 8 February in a league match against Racing.

He made his international debut for Paraguay in 2008.

== Career statistics ==
As of 9 March 2017.

Club statistics
Club	Season	League			Cup (Note: Includes the Copa Argentina.)		League Cup		Continental (Note: Includes the Copa Libertadores.)		Other		Total	
Club	Season	Division	Apps	Goals	Apps	Goals	Apps	Goals	Apps	Goals	Apps	Goals	Apps	Goals
Atlético Tucumán	2016	Primera División	7	0	0	0	—		—		0	0	7	0
Atlético Tucumán	2016–17	Primera División	1	0	0	0	—		2 (Note: Two appearances in 2017 Copa Libertadores)	0	0	0	3	0
Atlético Tucumán	Total		8	0	0	0	—		2	0	0	0	10	0
Career total			8	0	0	0	—		2	0	0	0	10	0

== Honours ==
Olimpia

- Paraguayan Primera División: 2011 Clausura

Sport Recife

- Copa do Nordeste: 2014
- Campeonato Pernambucano: 2014
