= Yoshiro Salazar =

Peruvian footballer (born 1987)

Personal information
- Full name: Yoshiro Abelardo Salazar Flores
- Date of birth: 26 March 1987 (age 39)
- Place of birth: Cusco, Peru
- Height: 1.78 m (5 ft 10 in)
- Position: Midfielder

Youth career
- Cienciano

Senior career*
Years	Team	Apps	(Gls)
2007–2009	Cienciano	7	(0)
2010	Cobresol	2	(0)
2011–2013	Real Garcilaso	35	(1)
2014–2015	Ayacucho	36	(2)
2015	Alianza Atlético	11	(0)
2016	Comerciantes Unidos	8	(0)
2017–2018	Cienciano	31	(3)
- * Club domestic league appearances and goals as of 3 March 2019

Yoshiro Abelardo Salazar Flores (born 26 March 1987) is a Peruvian footballer who plays for Cienciano.
