= Caleb (footballer) =

Brazilian footballer (born 1992)

Personal information
- Full name: Caleb Santos Jordão Rocha Carvalho
- Date of birth: 9 November 1992 (age 34)
- Place of birth: Belo Horizonte, Brazil
- Height: 1.72 m (5 ft 8 in)
- Position: Midfielder

Team information
- Current team: Atlético CP
- Number: 10

Youth career
- 2012: Boa Esporte

Senior career*
Years	Team	Apps	(Gls)
2011–2012	América Mineiro	4	(0)
2011–2012	→ Nacional-MG (loan)	9	(0)
2013	Nacional-MG	9	(4)
2013–2014	São Caetano	11	(0)
2015	Criciúma	0	(0)
2015	Resende	1	(0)
2015–2016	Louletano	28	(10)
2016–2018	Fátima	30	(1)
2018–2021	Olhanense	53	(12)
2021–2023	Amora	47	(5)
2023–2024	Vitória Setúbal	29	(4)
2024–	Atlético CP	44	(6)
- * Club domestic league appearances and goals as of 7 May 2026

Caleb Santos Jordão Rocha Carvalho (born 9 November 1992), known simply as Caleb, is a Brazilian football player who plays as a midfielder for Portuguese club Atlético CP.
