= Ricardo Mazacotte =

Argentine-Paraguayan footballer (born 1985)

Personal information
- Date of birth: 9 January 1985 (age 41)
- Place of birth: Formosa, Argentina
- Height: 1.83 m (6 ft 0 in)
- Position: Right-back

Senior career*
Years	Team	Apps	(Gls)
2004	Nacional		
2005	Sportivo Iteño		
2005–2008	Nacional		
2008	12 de Octubre		
2009–2012	Nacional		
2012–2013	Unión	9	(0)
2013	Olimpia	7	(2)
2014–2015	3 de Febrero	17	(0)
2015	Nacional	11	(0)
2016	Sol de América	2	(0)
2016–2017	Laferrere	9	(1)
2017	Primero de Mayo	9	(0)

International career
2012	Paraguay	2	(1)
- * Club domestic league appearances and goals

Ricardo Mazacotte (born 9 January 1985) is an Argentine-Paraguayan former professional footballer who played as a right-back.
