= Horacio Orzán =

Argentine footballer (born 1988)

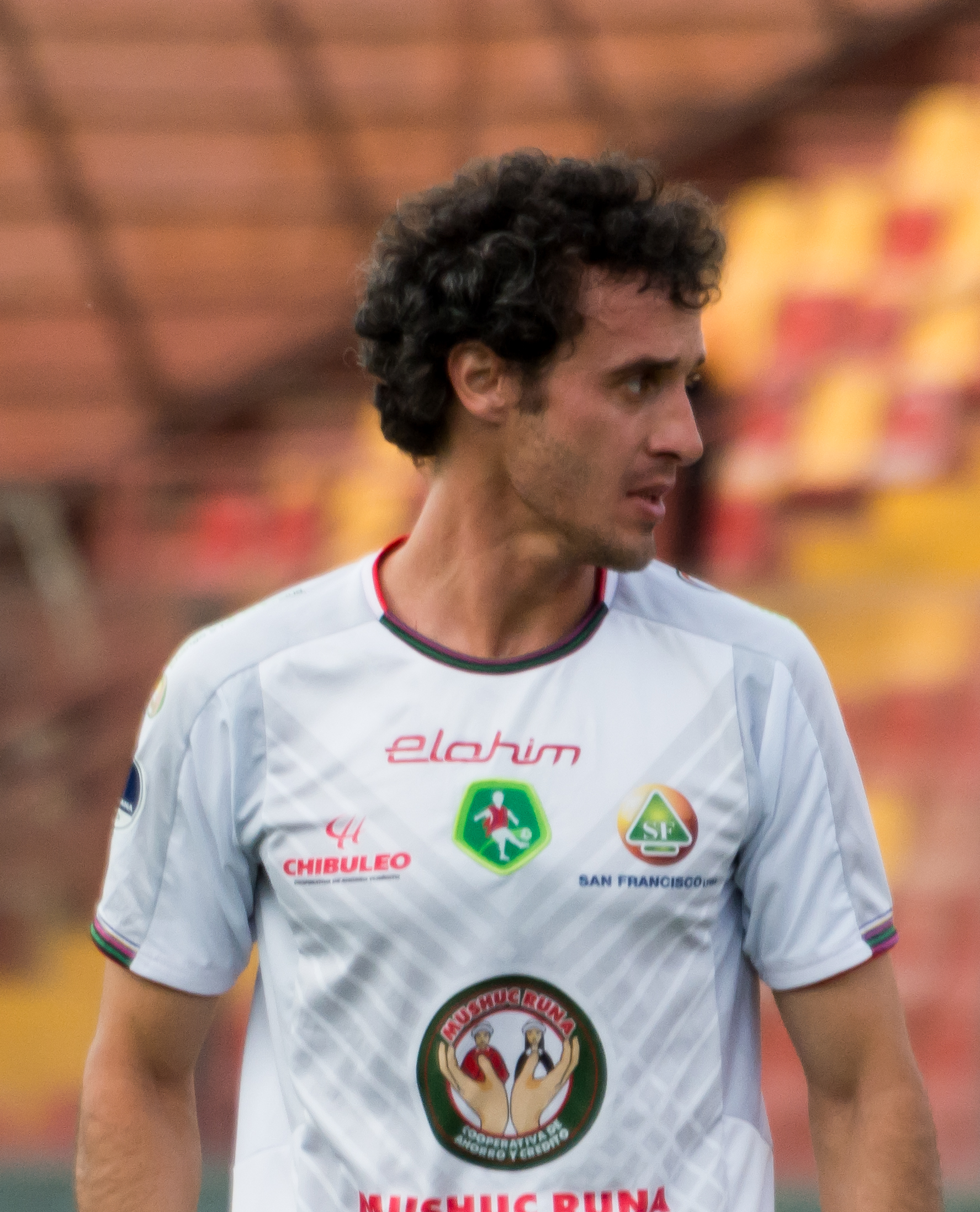
- Orzán in 2019

Personal information
- Full name: Horacio de Dios Orzán
- Date of birth: 14 April 1988 (age 38)
- Place of birth: Chaco, Argentina
- Height: 1.77 m (5 ft 10 in)
- Position: Midfielder

Team information
- Current team: FBC Melgar
- Number: 15

Senior career*
| Years | Team | Apps | (Gls) |
| 2008–2010 | Juventud | 38 | (0) |
| 2011–2012 | Sarmiento | 25 | (0) |
| 2012–2016 | Newell's Old Boys | 62 | (3) |
| 2015–2016 | → Tigre (loan) | 11 | (0) |
| 2016 | Universidad Católica | 20 | (0) |
| 2017–2019 | Sarmiento | 25 | (2) |
| 2019–2020 | Mushuc Runa | 48 | (2) |
| 2021– | Melgar | 142 | (0) |
- * Club domestic league appearances and goals as of 30 December 2025

Horacio de Dios Orzán (born 14 April 1988) is an Argentine footballer who plays as midfielder for Melgar.

== Honours ==
Newell's Old Boys

- Primera División: 2013 Final

Melgar

- Torneo Apertura: 2022
