= Enzo Prono =

Paraguayan footballer (born 1991)

Personal information
- Full name: Enzo Enrico Prono Zelaya
- Date of birth: 27 June 1991 (age 35)
- Place of birth: Asunción, Paraguay
- Height: 1.80 m (5 ft 11 in)
- Position: Striker

Youth career
- 2008: Fernando de la Mora
- 2009–2010: Libertad

Senior career*
Years	Team	Apps	(Gls)
2011–2013	Sol de América	65	(12)
2013	→ Olimpia (loan)	26	(4)
2014	→ Arsenal Sarandí (loan)	0	(0)
2015–2018	General Diaz	22	(3)
2015–2017	→ Atlante (loan)	59	(8)
2018	Zulia	25	(2)
2018	Aizawl	1	(0)
2018–2019	Alebrijes de Oaxaca	4	(0)

International career
2012	Paraguay	1	(0)
- * Club domestic league appearances and goals

Enzo Enrico Prono Zelaya (born 27 June 1991) is a Paraguayan former footballer who played as a striker.

== Career ==
=== Early career ===
Born in Asunción, Prono started his career with lowly Fernando de la Mora and subsequently joined Libertad, playing there until 2010. After one year with Libertad he moved to Europe, and had trials with Italian and Belgian clubs.

=== Sol de America ===
In 2011, Prono returned to his native country and joined Club Sol de América. He made his debut on 24 April, coming on as a late substitute in a 0–2 loss at Olimpia. He scored his first professional goal on 20 August, netting his side's only of a draw at Tacuary. He was an ever-present figure during the campaign, as Sol de America narrowly avoided relegation.

=== Olimpia ===
On 12 January 2013, Prono joined Club Olimpia in a one-year loan deal with a buyout clause.

=== Arsenal de Sarandí ===
On 27 June 2014, it was reported that Prono had joined Argentine Primera División club Arsenal de Sarandí on an 18-month loan deal.

== International career ==
On 10 February 2012, Prono was called up to Paraguay national football team. Five days later, he made his international debut, coming off the bench to replace José Ortigoza in the last 3 minutes of the 2–0 victory against Chile.

== Playing style ==
Prono is one of the greatest prospects of Paraguayan football. He is compared with Radamel Falcao and Lucas Barrios. His main ability, despite being a 178 cm tall, is his headers. This began in the Libertad youth system, when the youth coach told Prono to throw a ball in a wall and head it every day.
