= Jefferson Cuero =

Colombian footballer (born 1988)

Personal information
- Full name: Jefferson Cuero Castro
- Date of birth: 15 May 1988 (age 38)
- Place of birth: Tumaco, Colombia
- Height: 1.72 m (5 ft 8 in)
- Position: Left winger

Youth career
- Once Caldas

Senior career*
| Years | Team | Apps | (Gls) |
| 2010–2012 | Once Caldas | 58 | (10) |
| 2012 | Independiente Medellín | 10 | (0) |
| 2013–2014 | Santa Fe | 69 | (16) |
| 2015–2017 | Morelia | 86 | (10) |
| 2017 | → Santos Laguna (loan) | 0 | (0) |
| 2018 | América de Cali | 21 | (1) |
| 2019 | Rionegro Águilas | 13 | (0) |
| 2019–2020 | Jaguares de Córdoba | 23 | (1) |
- * Club domestic league appearances and goals as of 20:42, 24 January 2021 (UTC)

Jefferson Cuero Castro (born 15 May 1988) is a Colombian footballer.

== Club career ==
Cuero made his professional debut for Once Caldas on 6 March 2010 in a 3–0 loss against Deportivo Cali. Cuero started the match but was substituted at half time by Dayro Moreno. In his debut year he helped Once Caldas capture the 2010 Campeonato Finalización title. In 2012, he had a short stint at Independiente Medellín where he appeared in ten matches for the club. The following season Cuero moved to Santa Fe.

Cuero made his debut for Santa Fe at the 2013 Superliga Colombiana against Millonarios coming in for Cristian Borja in the 74th minute. Santa Fe would win the match 1–0 (3–2 on aggregate) and captured the 2013 Superliga Colombiana. On 21 December 2014 Cuero helped Santa Fe capture the 2014 Torneo Finalización after Santa Fe defeated his former team Independiente Medellín 3–2 on aggregate.

On 22 December 2014, the day after Cuero won the Campeonato Finalización with Santa Fe, it was announced Cuero was transferred to Liga MX club Monarcas Morelia

On 12 December 2017, he was transferred to Liga MX club Santos Laguna on a 1-year loan. On 26 December, Morelia announced that the transfer of Jefferson Cuero to Santos Laguna had been canceled following an injury that the player had.

On 1 February 2018, it was announced Cuero was transferred to Categoría Primera A club América de Cali.

== Honors ==
Once Caldas

- Categoría Primera A (1): 2010-II

Santa Fe

- Superliga Colombiana (1): 2013
- Categoría Primera A (1): 2014-II
