= Harold Reina =

Colombian footballer (born 1990)

Personal information
- Full name: Harold Fernando Reina Figueroa
- Date of birth: 18 July 1990 (age 36)
- Place of birth: Yumbo, Colombia
- Height: 1.77 m (5 ft 10 in)
- Position: Forward

Team information
- Current team: Llaneros
- Number: 9

Youth career
- 2003–2008: Deportivo Cali

Senior career*
Years	Team	Apps	(Gls)
2008	Deportivo Cali		
2009	Atlético La Sabana		
2010	Pacífico		
2010–2015	Deportivo Cali	15	(1)
2011	→ Cúcuta Deportivo (loan)	17	(3)
2012–2013	→ The Strongest (loan)	35	(19)
2013	→ AEK Larnaca (loan)	8	(3)
2014	→ Apollon Limassol (loan)	18	(1)
2015	→ Cortuluá (loan)	11	(1)
2016	Deportivo Pasto	13	(2)
2016–2017	Deportivo Pereira	41	(13)
2018–2019	Nacional Potosí	54	(26)
2019–2020	The Strongest	47	(5)
2022	Achuapa	18	(2)
2023–	Llaneros	4	(1)
- * Club domestic league appearances and goals as of 19:32, 9 April 2023 (UTC)

Harold Reina (born July 18, 1990) is a Colombian football forward who plays for Llaneros.

== Titles ==
Season	Club	Title
2010	Deportivo Cali	Copa Colombia
