= Luis Méndez (Bolivian footballer) =

Bolivian footballer (born 1985)

Personal information
- Full name: Luis Javier Méndez Moza
- Date of birth: 12 July 1985 (age 41)
- Place of birth: Santa Cruz de la Sierra, Bolivia
- Height: 1.85 m (6 ft 1 in)
- Position: Centre-back

Senior career*
Years	Team	Apps	(Gls)
2005–2007	Oriente Petrolero	0	(0)
2008	The Strongest		
2009	Oriente Petrolero	9	(1)
2010	San José	43	(4)
2011–2013	The Strongest	90	(4)
2015–2016	Sport Boys Warnes	8	(0)
2016	Wilstermann	10	(0)
2017	Oriente Petrolero	6	(0)

International career
2011–2012	Bolivia	6	(0)
- * Club domestic league appearances and goals

Luis Javier Méndez Moza (born 12 July 1985) is a Bolivian former professional footballer who played as a centre-back. He represented the Bolivia national team in four FIFA World Cup qualification matches.
