= Óscar Gamarra =

Paraguayan footballer (born 1987)

Personal information
- Full name: Óscar Moises Gamarra
- Date of birth: 13 August 1987 (age 39)
- Place of birth: Asunción, Paraguay
- Height: 1.79 m (5 ft 10 in)
- Position: Midfielder

Team information
- Current team: Melgar

Senior career*
Years	Team	Apps	(Gls)
2007–2009	Cerro Porteño	77	(6)
2009–2011	Coronel Bolognesi		
2011–2013	Cerro Porteño		
2013–	Real Garcilaso		
- * Club domestic league appearances and goals

Óscar Moises Gamarra (born 13 August 1987) is a Paraguayan footballer who plays as a midfielder for Melgar. He was trialing with Australian club Newcastle Jets FC. He also played for the Peruvian teams Coronel Bolognesi and Real Garcilaso.
