= Matías Giménez =

Argentine footballer

Personal information
- Full name: Matías Alejandro Giménez
- Date of birth: 23 December 1984 (age 41)
- Place of birth: Apóstoles, Argentina
- Height: 1.78 m (5 ft 10 in)
- Position: Left winger

Senior career*
Years	Team	Apps	(Gls)
2003–2009	Tigre	166	(18)
2010–2012	Boca Juniors	22	(3)
2011	→ San Lorenzo (loan)	11	(0)
2012	→ Belgrano (loan)	17	(2)
2013	Huracán	17	(3)
2013	Club Olimpia	7	(1)
2014	Águilas Doradas	4	(1)
2015	Argentinos Juniors	9	(0)
2016	Deportivo Armenio	13	(0)
2016–2017	Textil Mandiyú		
2019–2022	Dock Sud		
- * Club domestic league appearances and goals

Matías Alejandro Giménez (born 23 December 1984) is an Argentine former football winger.

== Career ==
Giménez started his career with Tigre in 2003, while the club were still in the regionalised 3rd division of Argentine football.

In 2004–05, the club won both the league titles to secure promotion to the 2nd division and in 2007 the club were promoted to the Argentine Primera for their first season at the top level of Argentine football since 1980.

The Apertura 2007 was Tigre's first season in the Primera since 1980, and Giménez's first taste of top flight football. The club finished in 2nd place which was the highest league finish in their history.

On December 28, 2009, Giménez signed with Boca Juniors.

On January 12, 2011, Giménez signed with San Lorenzo de Almagro, after being trade by Boca for Diego Rivero.

On January 31, 2012, Giménez was loaned out to Belgrano.

== Titles ==
Season	Team	Title
Apertura 2004	Tigre	Primera B Metropolitana
Clausura 2005	Tigre	Primera B Metropolitana
Apertura 2011	Boca Juniors	Primera División
