= Diego Tardelli =

Brazilian footballer (born 1985)

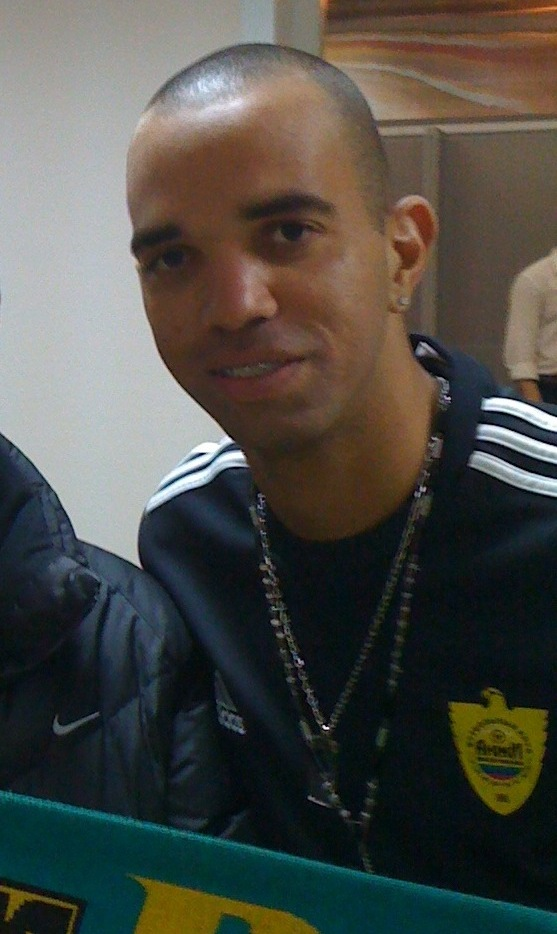
- Tardelli with Anzhi Makhachkala in 2011

Personal information
- Full name: Diego Tardelli Martins
- Date of birth: 10 May 1985 (age 41)
- Place of birth: Santa Bárbara d'Oeste, Brazil
- Height: 1.80 m (5 ft 11 in)
- Position: Forward

Youth career
- Partner Football
- 2000: → Santos (loan)
- 2001–2003: União Barbarense
- 2003–2004: São Paulo

Senior career*
Years	Team	Apps	(Gls)
2004–2007	São Paulo	112	(31)
2006	→ Betis (loan)	12	(0)
2006	→ São Caetano (loan)	7	(1)
2006–2007	→ PSV (loan)	13	(3)
2008	Flamengo	29	(5)
2009–2011	Atlético Mineiro	94	(56)
2011	Anzhi Makhachkala	13	(0)
2012	Al-Gharafa	24	(13)
2013–2014	Atlético Mineiro	69	(23)
2015–2018	Shandong Luneng	73	(41)
2019	Grêmio	35	(5)
2020–2021	Atlético Mineiro	9	(2)
2021	Santos	12	(1)
Total		502	(181)

International career
2005	Brazil U20	2	(0)
2009–2015	Brazil	14	(3)
- * Club domestic league appearances and goals

Diego Tardelli Martins (born 10 May 1985), known as Diego Tardelli, is a Brazilian former professional footballer who played as a forward. He was considered a dynamic player due to his speed on attack and individual skills. Tardelli is not his last name, but his second name: it was chosen by his father after his footballing idol, Italian World Cup winner Marco Tardelli.

== Club career ==
=== Early career ===
Born in Santa Bárbara d'Oeste, São Paulo, Tardelli began his career at a company club in Curitiba called Partner Football. He was loaned to Santos in 2000, but was released after trying to steal chocolate milk from the club's cafeteria. He subsequently joined hometown side União Barbarense, where he impressed enough to move to São Paulo in 2003. At the latter club, Tardelli was initially known as Dinei, a former forward of Corinthians, as he also painted his hair of a blond color.

=== São Paulo ===
Tardelli made his first team debut for São Paulo on 9 July 2003, coming on as a second-half substitute for Rico in a 2–0 Série A away win over Coritiba. He scored his first goal four days later, netting his team's second in a 3–1 win at Fluminense.

Tardelli subsequently established himself as a regular starter but was separated from the squad in 2004 for 45 days after arriving late for a training session. He returned to the squad after manager Cuca was replaced by Émerson Leão, and started the 2005 season with ten goals in the first ten matches of the club. After Leão left for the Japanese football, Tardelli's form dropped and he was again separated from the squad in October 2005, after arriving drunk on a training session.

==== Loans to Betis, São Caetano and PSV ====
On 12 December 2005, Tardelli agreed to a loan move to La Liga side Real Betis for the remainder of the 2005–06 campaign. He made his debut abroad the following 11 January, starting in a 0–0 home draw against RC Celta de Vigo, for the season's Copa del Rey.

After 15 goalless appearances, Tardelli returned to Brazil and joined São Caetano on loan on 12 July 2006. On 30 August, however, he moved to Eredivisie club PSV in a season-long loan deal.

Tardelli also struggled to feature regularly at PSV, and returned to Tricolor in July 2007, where he appeared sparingly for the club and lifted the 2007 Série A.

=== Flamengo ===
On 15 January 2008, São Paulo announced the transfer of Tardelli to Flamengo, after the club paid US$ 1 million for his federative rights. After initial controversies with teammate Souza, he was often used as a substitute, but still scored the winning goals in the Taça Guanabara and Campeonato Carioca finals, both against Botafogo.

Tardelli was unable to establish himself as a first-choice, and was mainly a backup option to Souza and Obina. He also saw his playing time limited due to an arm injury in August which left him sidelined for three months.

=== Atlético Mineiro ===
Tardelli left Flamengo on 12 January 2009, and subsequently signed for fellow league team Atlético Mineiro. At Galo, he scored a career-best 39 goals in his first campaign, being the nation's top goalscorer overall; highlights included a hat-trick in a 6–0 Campeonato Mineiro home routing of Uberaba on 8 April.

Tardelli continued to score in a prolific manner the following seasons, and scored another hat-trick in a 6–0 thrashing of Ituiutaba on 28 March 2010. He played his 100th match for the club on 30 October 2010, in a match against Botafogo.

On 12 February 2011, Tardelli scored a hat-trick in a 4–3 away win against fierce rivals Cruzeiro, but was sent off late in the match.

=== Anzhi Makhachkala ===
On 8 March 2011, Tardelli completed a move to Russian side Anzhi Makhachkala following an in-depth medical examination at the Dagi's pre-season training base. The club reportedly paid €7.5 million for his services on a four-year deal. He started in only seven games during the whole campaign, and failed to find the net in his 13 appearances. He was also strongly linked with a move back to his homeland after struggling to adapt to life in Russia.

=== Al-Gharafa ===
On 10 January 2012, Tardelli announced that he had put pen to paper on a two-and-a-half-year deal with Qatari side Al-Gharafa. His transfer fee was reported at €7 million.

Tardelli made his debut on 20 January 2012, missing a penalty kick 30 minutes after coming on as a substitute in a 2–0 loss against Al Khor. On his second-ever AFC Champions League match, he scored a brace in order to salvage a draw against Al-Hilal FC on 21 March.

=== Return to Atlético Mineiro ===
On 18 January 2013, Tardelli rejoined Atlético Mineiro on loan until the 2014 FIFA World Cup. The value of the negotiation was undisclosed. On 27 January, Tardelli confirmed the negotiations were nearly over, only waiting for a new player to arrive at his current club and by 31 January, the negotiation is complete and he joined Atlético Mineiro. Finally, on 2 February 2013, Alexandre Kalil, president of Atlético, announced the return of Tardelli. The deal is around €5.25 million with a four-year contract.

Tardelli was a regular starter for Galo during his first season, helping the club to a first-ever Copa Libertadores title and being the second-best goalscorer in the campaign with 18 goals, only one behind Jô. He also lifted the Recopa Sudamericana and the Copa do Brasil with the side in the following year, scoring goals in both tournaments' finals.

=== Shandong Luneng ===
On 17 January 2015, Tardelli joined Chinese club Shandong Luneng. On 14 February 2015, he made his official debut in the 2015 Chinese FA Super Cup against Guangzhou Evergrande Taobao.

On 13 July 2015, Tardelli scored two goals in a match against Shijiazhuang Ever Bright. A regular starter, he impressed during the 2018 Chinese Super League after scoring 17 goals.

=== Grêmio ===
On 12 February 2019, Tardelli joined Brazilian club Grêmio on a three-year contract. On 16 January 2020, after being severely criticized by the club's supporters and president, he terminated his contract.

=== Second return to Atlético Mineiro ===
On 12 February 2020, Tardelli joined Atlético Mineiro for the third time on a free transfer. In July, he suffered an ankle injury which sidelined him for the remainder of the year; he returned to action in February 2021.

Tardelli left the club in May of the following year, as his contract was due to expire.

=== Santos ===
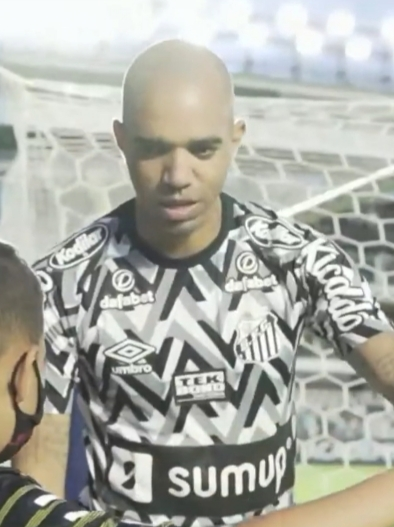
Tardelli in 2021

On 23 August 2021, Tardelli signed a contract with Santos until the end of the year, with an option to extend it for a further five months. On 10 December, after one goal in 13 appearances, he departed the club.

== International career ==
Tardelli was called up by Brazilian coach Dunga on 28 July 2009 for a friendly match against Estonia in Tallinn on 12 August. This was his first ever call up to the Brazil national team. On 11 May 2010, he was called up to the 2010 FIFA World Cup squad as one of the seven backup players.

In October 2013, in a great shape playing for Atlético Mineiro, Tardelli said on being left out from manager Luiz Felipe Scolari international squad, "Now, again, football professionals have asked my calling up. I did not give up yet, I keep working, who knows about Brazilian team is Felipão [Scolari] or who is inside there can watch my phase." On 11 October 2014, in the 2014 Superclásico de las Américas in Beijing, he scored both goals of a 2–0 victory against Argentina.

On 28 May 2015, Tardelli was included in Brazil's 23-man squad for the 2015 Copa América by coach Dunga. On 15 October 2017, he was called by manager Tite to games against Bolivia and Chile.

== Career statistics ==
=== Club ===
As of 10 December 2021

Appearances and goals by club, season and competition
Club	Season	League			State League		National cup		Continental		Other		Total	
Club	Season	Division	Apps	Goals	Apps	Goals	Apps	Goals	Apps	Goals	Apps	Goals	Apps	Goals
São Paulo	2003	Série A	23	9	0	0	—		6 (Note: Appearance(s) in Copa Sudamericana)	3	—		29	12
São Paulo	2004	Série A	29	7	3	1	—		5 (Note: Three appearances in Copa Libertadores, two appearances in Copa Sudamericana)	0	—		37	8
São Paulo	2005	Série A	19	1	18	12	—		10 (Note: Eight appearances and four goals in Copa Libertadores, two appearances in Copa Sudamericana)	4	—		47	17
São Paulo	2007	Série A	20	1	—		—		5	0	—		25	1
São Paulo	Total		91	18	21	13	—		26	7	—		138	38
Betis (loan)	2005–06	La Liga	12	0	—		2	0	3 (Note: Appearance(s) in UEFA Cup)	1	—		17	1
São Caetano (loan)	2006	Série A	7	1	—		—		—		—		7	1
PSV (loan)	2006–07	Eredivisie	13	3	—		—		5 (Note: Appearance(s) in UEFA Champions League)	0	—		18	3
Flamengo	2008	Série A	16	0	13	5	—		6	1	—		35	6
Atlético Mineiro	2009	Série A	33	19	16	16	5	4	1	0	—		55	39
Atlético Mineiro	2010	Série A	27	10	14	7	6	7	2	0	—		49	24
Atlético Mineiro	2011	Série A	0	0	4	4	2	2	—		—		6	6
Atlético Mineiro	Total		60	29	34	27	13	13	3	0	—		110	69
Anzhi Makhachkala	2011–12	Russian Premier League	13	0	—		1	0	—		—		14	0
Al-Gharafa	2011–12	Qatar Stars League	10	4	—		4	1	5 (Note: Appearance(s) in AFC Champions League)	2	—		19	7
Al-Gharafa	2012–13	Qatar Stars League	14	9	—		—		—		7	10	21	19
Al-Gharafa	Total		24	13	—		4	1	5	2	7	10	41	26
Atlético Mineiro	2013	Série A	26	7	10	4	1	0	13 (Note: Appearance(s) in Copa Libertadores)	6	2	1	52	18
Atlético Mineiro	2014	Série A	24	10	9	2	7	1	8	0	2 (Note: Appearance(s) in Recopa Sudamericana)	2	50	15
Atlético Mineiro	Total		50	17	19	6	8	1	21	6	4	3	102	33
Shandong Luneng	2015	Chinese Super League	19	6	—		4	0	5	0	1 (Note: Appearance(s) in Chinese FA Super Cup)	0	29	6
Shandong Luneng	2016	Chinese Super League	12	3	—		—		9	6	—		21	9
Shandong Luneng	2017	Chinese Super League	18	15	—		1	1	—		—		19	16
Shandong Luneng	2018	Chinese Super League	24	17	—		5	3	—		—		29	20
Shandong Luneng	Total		73	41	—		10	4	14	6	1	0	98	51
Grêmio	2019	Série A	29	4	6	1	2	1	10	1	—		47	7
Atlético Mineiro	2020	Série A	3	0	1	0	—		—		—		4	0
Atlético Mineiro	2021	Série A	0	0	5	2	0	0	2	0	—		7	2
Atlético Mineiro	Total		3	0	6	2	0	0	2	0	—		11	2
Santos	2021	Série A	12	1	—		1	0	—		—		13	1
Career total			403	127	99	54	41	20	95	24	11	13	649	238

=== International ===
Appearances and goals by national team and year
National team	Year	Apps	Goals
Brazil	2009	4	0
Brazil	2010	1	0
Brazil	2014	4	2
Brazil	2015	5	1
Total		14	3

Scores and results list Brazil's goal tally first.

No.	Date	Venue	Opponent	Score	Result	Competition	Ref.
1.	11 October 2014	Beijing National Stadium, Beijing, China	Argentina	1–0	2–0	2014 Superclássico das Américas	
2.	11 October 2014	Beijing National Stadium, Beijing, China	Argentina	2–0	2–0	2014 Superclássico das Américas	
3.	7 June 2015	Allianz Parque, São Paulo, Brazil	Mexico	2–0	2–0	Friendly	

== Honours ==
São Paulo

- Campeonato Paulista: 2005
- Copa Libertadores: 2005
- Campeonato Brasileiro Série A: 2007

PSV

- Eredivisie: 2006–07

Flamengo

- Taça Guanabara: 2008
- Campeonato Carioca: 2008

Atlético Mineiro

- Campeonato Mineiro: 2010, 2013, 2020, 2021
- Copa Libertadores: 2013
- Recopa Sudamericana: 2014
- Copa do Brasil: 2014

Al-Gharafa

- Emir of Qatar Cup: 2012

Shandong Luneng

- Chinese FA Super Cup: 2015

Grêmio

- Campeonato Gaúcho: 2019

Brazil

- Superclásico de las Américas: 2014

Individual

- Campeonato Brasileiro Série A Team of the Year: 2009, 2014
- Campeonato Brasileiro Série A top goalscorer: 2009
- Arthur Friedenreich Award: 2009
