= Herminio Miranda =

Paraguayan footballer (born 1985)

Personal information
- Full name: Herminio Antonio Miranda Ovelar
- Date of birth: 7 May 1985 (age 41)
- Place of birth: Ita, Paraguay
- Height: 1.85 m (6 ft 1 in)
- Position: Centre-back

Team information
- Current team: Presidente Hayes

Senior career*
Years	Team	Apps	(Gls)
2005	General Caballero ZC	18	(0)
2006–2007	2 de Mayo		
2007–2008	Huachipato	38	(1)
2008–2013	Nacional Asunción	92	(17)
2012–2013	→ Puebla (loan)	14	(1)
2013	Olimpia Asunción	28	(1)
2013–2015	Correcaminos	25	(0)
2015	→ Olimpia Asunción (loan)	18	(2)
2016–2017	Nacional Asunción	53	(1)
2018	Deportivo Santaní	36	(0)
2019	River Plate Asunción	35	(1)
2020	12 de Octubre	5	(0)
2021–	Presidente Hayes		
- * Club domestic league appearances and goals as of 20:41, 31 May 2020 (UTC)

Herminio Antonio Miranda Ovelar (born 7 May 1985) is a Paraguayan footballer who plays as a centre-back for Paraguayan Primera B club Presidente Hayes. Miranda played in the Copa Libertadores and Copa Sudamericana for Nacional Asunción and Olimpia Asunción.

== Career ==
=== General Caballero ZC ===
In 2005, Miranda featured for General Caballero ZC for the Primera División Paraguaya season in a squad with Anthony Silva, Aristides Rojas, and Brazilians Josias Cardoso and Fernando Oliveira. On 9 October 2005, he scored an own goal in the 28th minute of a 2-0 away defeat to Cerro Porteño. Miranda made a total of 18 appearances for the club.

=== 2 de Mayo ===
In 2006, Miranda joined General Caballero ZC teammate Anthony Silva at Sportivo 2 de Mayo. At 2 de Mayo, Miranda totalled 3 goals in 33 appearances.

=== Huachipato ===
==== 2007 season ====
In June 2007, he moved to the Chilean Primera División club Huachipato.

==== 2008 season ====
In his second season at Huachipato, Miranda was accompanied in the squad by Paraguayans Henry Lapczyk and Jose Burgos.

=== Nacional Asunción ===
After a successful season at the steelers, he joined to Club Nacional alongside his teammate Ignacio Don. At Nacional, he earned two Primera División titles, the 2009 Clausura and the 2011 Apertura.

==== Puebla (loan) ====
In May 2012, Miranda was loaned to Mexican club Puebla with the option to buy the player. The club president confirmed the signing through Twitter. Miranda's signing was to fill the vacancy of Jonathan Lacerda. In August 2012, Miranda noted a goal against Lobos de la BUAP in the third round of the Copa Mexico.

=== Olimpia Asunción ===
In 2013, Miranda reached the final of the Copa Libertadores with Olimpia Asunción.

=== Correcaminos ===
==== Olimpia Asunción (loan) ====
In 2015, Olimpia were crowned champions of the Torneo Clausura with Miranda in their squad.

=== Presidente Hayes ===
On 17 April 2021, Miranda signed with Club Presidente Hayes for the Primera B season. Miranda's first appearance for the club was in a 3-1 away defeat to 3 de Noviembre under coach Edgar Denis.

== Coaching career ==
In 2021, Miranda revealed that he was licensed to be a coach and that he would go into coaching after his playing career is finished.

== Style of play ==
He has been described by columnist, Tim Vickery, as a defensive organizer with strong free kicking ability.

== Personal life ==
Miranda has a business which constructs houses and apartments and then sells them.

== Honours ==
Nacional Asunción

- Paraguayan Primera División: 2009 Clausura, 2011 Apertura
