= Martín Vázquez (referee) =

Uruguayan football referee (born 1969)

Martín Emilio Vázquez Broquetas (born January 14, 1969) is a Uruguayan football referee. He has been a FIFA international referee since 2001. He lives in Montevideo. He has refereed games at the 2008 Olympics, Copa Libertadores and qualifiers for 2006 FIFA World Cup and 2010 FIFA World Cup.

He was preselected as a referee for the 2010 FIFA World Cup. At the end of 2014, Vazquez retired after 13 years in International Soccer Matches.
