= Juan Carlos Ferreyra =

Argentine football striker

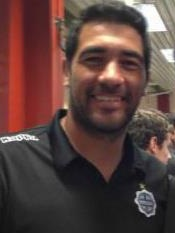

Personal information
- Full name: Juan Carlos Ferreyra
- Date of birth: September 12, 1983 (age 43)
- Place of birth: San Rafael, Argentina
- Height: 1.91 m (6 ft 3 in)
- Position: Striker

Senior career*
Years	Team	Apps	(Gls)
2001–2002	San Martín de Monte Comán	?	(?)
2002–2003	Yupanqui	21	(12)
2003	Independiente Rivadavia	6	(2)
2004	San Martín de Monte Comán	?	(?)
2004–2005	Almirante Brown	28	(9)
2005–2006	Gimnasia La Plata	17	(2)
2006	Deportivo Cali	11	(3)
2007	Deportivo Cuenca	40	(17)
2008	Newell's Old Boys	22	(3)
2009	Macará	31	(9)
2010	Olimpia	42	(21)
2011	All Boys	16	(5)
2012	Barcelona SC	9	(1)
2013	Olimpia	51	(17)
2014	Botafogo	19	(3)
2015	Unión Española	38	(15)
2016	Gimnasia Mendoza	0	(0)
2016–2017	Rincón del Atuel		
2017	Huracán (San Rafael)		
2017–	Rincón del Atuel		
- * Club domestic league appearances and goals as of 13 April 2015

Juan Carlos Ferreyra (born 12 September 1983 in San Rafael) is an Argentine football striker currently playing for Club Social y Deportivo Rincón del Ariel. He is nicknamed el Tanque (the Tank) because of his height.

== Career ==
Ferreyra began his career in the lower leagues of Argentine football where he played for clubs such as Independiente Rivadavia Yupanqui and Almirante Brown. Because of his success he was transferred to Gimnasia de La Plata. He has also played for Deportivo Cali in Colombia and Deportivo Cuenca in Ecuador.

The Newell's Old Boys forward will play on loan for O'Higgins, until the end of the season.

Ferreyra will play in Club Olimpia from Paraguay in the second half of the 2010 season. He has already scored 2 goals in 2 friendly matches played in Chile (both were against Colo Colo). The "Tank's" official debut in Club Olimpia is giving hope to all those fans of Olimpia who has last won the Paraguayan Cup in the year 2000. He recently signed a contract with club Universitario for a 3-year deal. Ahora ya en Barcelona S.C. 2012. In 2013, he was vice-champion at Libertadores with Olimpia (PAR). In 2014, he signed with Botafogo, from Brazil.
