= Salustiano Candia =

Paraguayan football defender (born 1983)

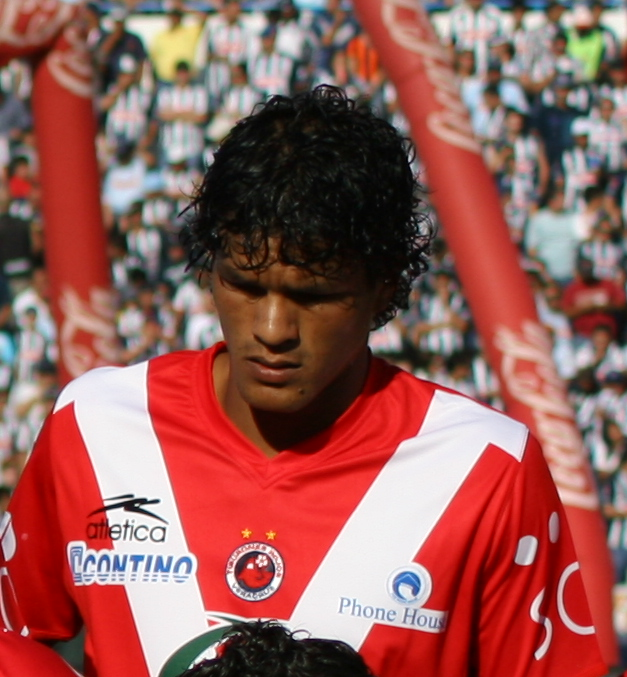
- Candia in 2008

Personal information
- Full name: Salustiano Sebastián Costa Candia
- Date of birth: 8 July 1983 (age 43)
- Place of birth: Asunción, Paraguay
- Height: 1.83 m (6 ft 0 in)
- Position: Centre-back

Youth career
- 2 de Mayo

Senior career*
| Years | Team | Apps | (Gls) |
| 2005–2006 | 2 de Mayo | 40 | (3) |
| 2007 | Godoy Cruz | 6 | (0) |
| 2007 | Olimpo | 7 | (0) |
| 2008 | Veracruz | 16 | (1) |
| 2008–2011 | Colón | 90 | (0) |
| 2012–2017 | Olimpia | 164 | (4) |
| 2014 | → Atlante (loan) | 17 | (0) |
| 2017–2018 | Club Libertad | 70 | (0) |
| 2019 | Cerro Porteño | 25 | (0) |
| 2020–2021 | Guaireña | 64 | (4) |

International career
| 2012–2017 | Paraguay | 10 | (0) |
- * Club domestic league appearances and goals as of 23:56, 28 February 2022 (UTC)

Salustiano Antonio Candia (born 8 July 1983) is a Paraguayan football defender.

== Career ==
Candia has played for 2 de Mayo, Godoy Cruz, Olimpo, CD Veracruz, Colón de Santa Fe and for Olimpia of Paraguay.
