= Wilson Pittoni =

Paraguayan footballer (born 1985)

Personal information
- Full name: Wilson Omar Pittoni Rodríguez
- Date of birth: 14 August 1985 (age 41)
- Place of birth: San Antonio, Paraguay
- Height: 1.66 m (5 ft 5 in)
- Position: Midfielder

Team information
- Current team: Guaraní

Senior career*
Years	Team	Apps	(Gls)
2006–2008	Libertad	44	(2)
2009	Sol de América	20	(2)
2009	Tacuary	13	(0)
2010	Libertad	36	(2)
2011–2012	Figueirense	24	(1)
2013	Olimpia	27	(1)
2014–2016	Bahia	24	(1)
2014	→ Olimpia (loan)	16	(0)
2016–2017	Olimpia	24	(2)
2017–	Guaraní	0	(0)

International career^{‡}
2011–2013	Paraguay	5	(1)
- * Club domestic league appearances and goals as of 16 February 2017 (UTC) ‡ National team caps and goals as of 14 August 2012

Wilson Omar Pittoni Rodríguez, better known as Wilson Pittoni (born 14 August 1985), is a Paraguayan professional footballer who plays as a midfielder for Guaraní.

== Club career ==
Born in San Antonio, Central Department, Wilson Pittoni defended Libertad in 2008. Wilson Pittoni played for Sol de América and Tacuary in 2009. He returned to Libertad in 2010, when he played 36 Paraguayan Primera División games and scored two goals. Wilson Pittoni won the Primera División Clausura tournament during that year. He joined Brazilian club Figueirense of the Série A in December 2010 to play in the 2011 season. After playing for Olimpia in the 2013 season, he joined Bahia of Brazil on 11 January 2014.

== International career ==
Wilson Pittoni has made his debut for Paraguay in a friendly match against Honduras, having also made an appearance at the 2014 FIFA World Cup qualification match against Peru.

== Career statistics ==
Scores and results list Paraguay's goal tally first.

Goal	Date	Venue	Opponent	Score	Result	Competition
1.	14 August 2013	Fritz-Walter-Stadion, Kaiserslautern, Germany	Germany	2 – 0	3 – 3	Friendly

== Honors ==
Libertad

- Paraguayan Primera División: 2010 Clausura

Bahia

- Campeonato Baiano: 2014
