= 2013 Liga Deportiva Universitaria de Quito season =

LDU Quito
2013 season
- President: Carlos Arroyo
- Manager: Edgardo Bauza
- Stadium: Estadio Casa Blanca
- Serie A: First Stage: 2nd Second Stage: 9th Aggregate: 6th
- Top goalscorer: League: Jaime Ayoví (8 goals); All: Jaime Ayoví (8 goals)
- Highest home attendance: 22,104; (April 7 v. Barcelona)
- Lowest home attendance: 1,411; (December 1 v. Deportivo Cuenca)
- Average home league attendance: 5,248
Home colours	Away colours

Liga Deportiva Universitaria de Quito's 2013 season was the club's 83rd year of existence, the 60th year in professional football, and the 52nd in the top level of professional football in Ecuador.

== Club ==
Personnel

President: Carlos Arroyo
Honorary President: Rodrigo Paz
President of the Executive Commission: Esteban Paz
President of the Football Commission: Edwin Ripalda
Vice-President of the Football Commission: Patricio Torres
Sporting manager: Santiago Jácome

Coaching staff

Manager: Edgardo Bauza
Assistant manager: José Daniel Di Leo
Physical trainer: Bruno Militano
Goalkeeper trainer: Gustavo Flores
Statistician: Maximiliano Bauza

Kits
Supplier: Umbro
Sponsor(s): Discover, Chevrolet, Coca-Cola, DirecTV

Copa Libertadores kit	Copa Libertadores alternate kit

== Squad information ==
Liga's squad for the season is allowed a maximum of four foreign players at any one time, and a maximum of eight throughout the season. At the start of the season, Liga was mandated to start one under-18 player in each match. The jersey numbers in the main table (directly below) refer to the number on their domestic league jersey. The under-18 players will wear a jersey number of at least #50. For each CONMEBOL competition, Liga must register 25 players, whose jerseys will be numbered 1–25. Because of this, some players may have different jersey numbers while playing in CONMEBOL matches.

N	Pos	Nat.	Player	Age	Since	App	Goals	Notes
1	GK	ECU	Daniel Viteri	31	2011	21	0	Previously with the club from '08–'09
2	DF	ECU	Norberto Araujo (captain)	34	2007	173	0	
3	DF	ECU	Luis Luna	24	2012	5	0	
4	DF	ECU	José Madrid	24	2013	0	0	
5	DF	ECU	Paúl Ambrosi	32	2013	367	35	Previously with the club from '00–'09 and '10–'12
6	DF	ARG	Ignacio Canuto	26	2013	0	0	
7	MF	ECU	Carlos Feraud	22	2013	0	0	
8	MF	ECU	Édison Méndez (vice-captain)	33	2012	102	13	Previously with the club from '05–'06 and '09–'10
9	FW	ECU	Carlos Garcés	22	2013	0	0	
10	MF	ECU	Luis Saritama	29	2013	0	0	
11	FW	ECU	Jaime Ayoví	25	2013	0	0	
12	MF	ECU	Francisco Rojas	21	2013	0	0	
13	DF	ECU	Néicer Reasco	35	2008	474	34	Previously with the club from '97–'00 and '01–'06
14	FW	PAR	Julián Benítez	26	2013	0	0	
15	DF	ECU	Carlos Arboleda	21	2013	0	0	
16	MF	ECU	Luis Bolaños	28	2013	126	22	Previously with the club from '02–'04, '07–'08 and '11–'12
17	FW	ECU	Luis Santana	21	2013	0	0	
18	MF	ECU	Fernando Hidalgo	27	2011	86	2	
19	FW	ARG	Gustavo Bou	23	2013	0	0	
20	MF	PAR	Enrique Vera	33	2013	139	9	Previously with the club from '06–'08, '09–'10 and '11–'12
21	MF	ECU	Hugo Vélez	26	2013	0	0	
22	GK	ECU	Alexander Domínguez (3rd captain)	25	2006	175	0	
23	DF	ECU	Koob Hurtado	27	2013	0	0	
24	GK	ECU	Walter Chávez	18	2011	0	0	
25	DF	ECU	Eduardo Morante	25	2013	0	0	
30	MF	ECU	Romario Ibarra	18	2013	0	0	
51	DF	ECU	Gabriel Corozo	17	2012	4	0	U-18 player
52	FW	ECU	Diego Hurtado	17	2011	4	0	U-18 player
54	FW	ECU	Kevin Mercado	17	2012	5	0	U-18 player

Note: Caps and goals are of the national league and are current as of the beginning of the season.

=== Winter transfers ===
In a press conference on December 18, 2012, Liga de Quito announced the signings of Carlos Arboleda of Deportivo Quevedo, Hugo Vélez of El Nacional and Koob Hurtado of LDU Loja. On the same day, Sporting Kansas City signed with Claudio Bieler as Designated Player. On December 19, 2012, Liga de Quito announced the signings of Carlos Feraud and Marco Mosquera of LDU Loja. On December 20, 2012, Liga de Quito announced the signings of Carlos Garcés and Francisco Rojas of Manta FC, Marco Posligua of Pilahuin, Yeison Ordóñez of Independiente José Terán and Johao Montaño of Deportivo Quito. In the same press conference, Ignacio Canuto was announced as the new foreign player of the team. On January 3, 2013, Liga de Quito announced the signings of José Madrid of El Nacional and Luis Saritama of Deportivo Quito.

Players In
Name	Nat	Pos	Age	Moving from
Carlos Arboleda	ECU	DF	21	Deportivo Quevedo (Ecuador)
Ignacio Canuto	ARG	DF	26	Figueirense (Brazil)
Koob Hurtado	ECU	DF	27	LDU Loja (Ecuador)
José Madrid	ECU	DF	24	El Nacional (Ecuador)
Eduardo Morante	ECU	DF	25	Universidad de Chile (loan)
Carlos Feraud	ECU	MF	22	LDU Loja (Ecuador)
Romario Ibarra	ECU	MF	18	Universidad Católica (Ecuador)
Johao Montaño	ECU	MF	18	Deportivo Quito (Ecuador)
Marco Mosquera	ECU	MF	28	LDU Loja (Ecuador)
Yeison Ordóñez	ECU	MF	20	Independiente José Terán (Ecuador)
Marco Posligua	ECU	MF	19	Pilahuin Tío (Ecuador)
Francisco Rojas	ECU	MF	21	Manta (Ecuador)
Luis Saritama	ECU	MF	29	Deportivo Quito (Ecuador)
Hugo Vélez	ECU	MF	26	El Nacional (Ecuador)
Enrique Vera	PAR	MF	33	Injury
Carlos Garcés	ECU	FW	22	Manta (Ecuador)
Federico Puppo	URU	FW	26	Defensor Sporting (Uruguay) (loan)
Luis Santana	ECU	FW	21	Técnico Universitario (Ecuador)

Players Out
Name	Nat	Pos	Age	Moving to
Elvis Bone	ECU	DF	29	El Nacional (Ecuador)
Diego Calderón	ECU	DF	26	Colorado Rapids (United States)
Galo Corozo	ECU	DF	22	Deportivo Cuenca (Ecuador)
Ulises de la Cruz	ECU	DF	38	Retired
Ezequiel Luna	ARG	DF	26	Santiago Wanderers (Chile)
Paúl Ambrosi	ECU	MF	32	Cerro Porteño (Paraguay) (loan)
José Francisco Cevallos	ECU	MF	18	Juventus (Italy) (loan)
Ángel Cheme	ECU	MF	31	Deportivo Quito (Ecuador)
Eduardo Echeverría	PAR	MF	23	Manta (Ecuador)
Joao Plata	ECU	MF	20	Toronto FC (Canada) (loan return)
Sandro Rojas	ECU	MF	19	Clan Juvenil (Ecuador)
Claudio Bieler	ECU	FW	28	Sporting Kansas City (United States)
José Gutiérrez	ECU	FW	20	LDU Portoviejo (Ecuador)
Ariel Nahuelpan	ARG	FW	25	Barcelona (Ecuador) (loan)
Marco Nazareno	ECU	FW	19	LDU Loja (Ecuador)

=== Summer transfers ===
On April 16, 2013, veteran midfielder Patricio Urrutia announced his retirement from professional football. He played his last game on May 23. In a press conference on June 24, 2013, Liga de Quito announced the signing of Jaime Ayoví for one year on a loan from Club Tijuana.

Players In
Name	Nat	Pos	Age	Moving from
Paúl Ambrosi	ECU	DF	32	Cerro Porteño (Paraguay) (loan return)
Luis Bolaños	ECU	MF	28	San Martín (Argentina) (loan return)
Jaime Ayoví	ECU	FW	25	Club Tijuana (Mexico) (loan)
Julián Benítez	PAR	FW	26	Nacional (Paraguay) (loan)
Gustavo Bou	ARG	FW	23	Olimpo (Argentina) (loan)

Players Out
Name	Nat	Pos	Age	Moving to
Johao Montaño	ECU	MF	18	Macará (Ecuador) (loan)
Marco Mosquera	ECU	MF	28	Olmedo (Ecuador)
Patricio Urrutia	ECU	MF	34	Retired
Pablo Vitti	ARG	MF	27	Tigre (Argentina)
Federico Puppo	URU	FW	26	Defensor Sporting (Uruguay) (loan return)

== Competitions ==
Competition	Started round	Final position / round	First match	Last match
Serie A	First Stage	6th	Jan 26	Dec 8
Copa Libertadores	First Stage	First Stage	Jan 23	Jan 30

=== Pre-season friendlies ===
January 13	LDU Quito reserves	2–0	Universidad Católica reserves	Complejo de Pomasqui
	Nahuelpan; Ordóñez	Report

January 13	LDU Quito starters	1–1	Universidad Católica starters	Complejo de Pomasqui
	Vitti	Report	?

January 16	LDU Quito	3–2	Macará	Quito
11:30 UTC−05:00	Madrid; Garcés; Vitti	Report	Guerra; Gámez	Stadium: Estadio Casa Blanca

January 19 La Noche Blanca	LDU Quito	3–1	Aucas	Quito
18:30 UTC−05:00	Rojas 30'; Garcés 35'; Feraud 54'		Martínez 67'	Stadium: Estadio Casa Blanca; Attendance: 25,887; Referee: Hugo Dávalos

=== Other friendlies ===
June 5	Aucas	0–1	LDU Quito	Quito
16:00 (UTC-5)		Report	Feraud 35'	Stadium: S.D. Aucas; Referee: Carlos Orbe

=== Serie A ===
The 2013 season is Liga's 52nd season in the Serie A and their twelfth consecutive. The league season will run from late January to early December. The format is identical to the previous season.

==== First stage ====
Pos	Team	Pld	W	D	L	GF	GA	GD	Pts	Qualification
1	Emelec	22	14	3	5	28	17	+11	45	2014 Copa Libertadores Second Stage and 2014 Copa Sudamericana First Stage
2	LDU Quito	22	12	5	5	26	19	+7	41	
3	Independiente del Valle	22	12	3	7	37	25	+12	39	
4	Deportivo Quito	22	10	8	4	41	24	+17	38	
5	Barcelona	22	11	5	6	33	19	+14	38	

Overall								Home						Away					
Pld	W	D	L	GF	GA	GD	Pts	W	D	L	GF	GA	GD	W	D	L	GF	GA	GD
22	12	5	5	26	19	+7	41	7	1	3	15	11	+4	5	4	2	11	8	+3

January 26 Round 1	LDU Quito	2–1	Universidad Católica	Quito
12:00 UTC−05:00	Vitti 44', 55' (pen.)	Report	Corozo 9' (o.g.)	Stadium: Estadio Casa Blanca; Attendance: 5,057; Referee: José Luis Espinel

February 10 Round 3	El Nacional	0–1	LDU Quito	Quito
12:00 UTC−05:00		Report	Canuto 4'	Stadium: Estadio Olímpico Atahualpa; Attendance: 15,866; Referee: Carlos Vera

February 15 Round 4	LDU Quito	1–2	Emelec	Quito
19:30 UTC−05:00	Puppo 80'	Report	Quiñónez 48'; Gaibor 85'	Stadium: Estadio Casa Blanca; Attendance: 14,817; Referee: Diego Lara

February 20 Round 2	Deportivo Cuenca	0–0	LDU Quito	Cuenca
20:00 UTC−05:00		Report		Stadium: Estadio Alejandro Serrano Aguilar; Attendance: 10,857; Referee: Daniel Salazar
Note: The match was postponed, by request, because of Liga's participation in the Copa Libertadores.

February 24 Round 5	Deportivo Quevedo	0–0	LDU Quito	Quevedo
15:00 UTC−05:00		Report		Stadium: Estadio 7 de Octubre; Attendance: 4,020; Referee: Roberto Alman

March 3 Round 6	LDU Quito	2–0	Manta	Quito
11:30 UTC−05:00	Hidalgo 35'; Vitti 63'	Report		Stadium: Estadio Casa Blanca; Attendance: 4,849; Referee: Carlos Orbe

March 8 Round 7	LDU Loja	0–0	LDU Quito	Loja
19:45 UTC−05:00		Report		Stadium: Estadio Federativo Reina del Cisne; Attendance: 8,017; Referee: José Luis Espinel

March 13 Round 8	LDU Quito	2–1	Independiente José Terán	Quito
19:30 UTC−05:00	Vitti 42', 58'	Report	Angulo 10'	Stadium: Estadio Casa Blanca; Attendance: 3,530; Referee: Miguel Hidalgo

March 31 Round 9	Deportivo Quito	2–1	LDU Quito	Quito
12:00 UTC−05:00	Nieto 29', 43' (pen.)	Report	Méndez 49'	Stadium: Estadio Olímpico Atahualpa; Attendance: 16,654; Referee: Omar Ponce

April 7 Round 10	LDU Quito	1–0	Barcelona	Quito
11:30 UTC−05:00	Méndez 54'	Report		Stadium: Estadio Casa Blanca; Attendance: 22,104; Referee: Samuel Haro

April 14 Round 11	Macará	0–3	LDU Quito	Ambato
12:45 UTC−05:00		Report	Saritama 30'; Reasco 86'; Vitti 90'	Stadium: Estadio Bellavista; Attendance: 7,457; Referee: Carlos Orbe

April 21 Round 12	LDU Quito	1–0	Macará	Quito
11:30 UTC−05:00	Méndez 57' (pen.)	Report		Stadium: Estadio Casa Blanca; Attendance: 5,244; Referee: Diego Lara

April 28 Round 13	Barcelona	3–0	LDU Quito	Guayaquil
16:45 UTC−05:00	Díaz 43', 56'; Nahuelpan 63' (pen.)	Report		Stadium: Estadio Monumental Banco Pichincha; Attendance: 15,556; Referee: Omar Ponce

May 4 Round 14	LDU Quito	1–3	Deportivo Quito	Quito
16:00 UTC−05:00	Puppo 74'	Report	Colón 14'; Calderón 49'; Nieto 90'	Stadium: Estadio Casa Blanca; Attendance: 10,575; Referee: Miguel Hidalgo

May 8 Round 15	Independiente José Terán	1–2	LDU Quito	Sangolquí
19:30 UTC−05:00	González 78'	Report	Garcés 20'; Vitti 74'	Stadium: Estadio Rumiñahui; Attendance: 2,521; Referee: Edgar Hinostroza

May 12 Round 16	LDU Quito	1–1	LDU Loja	Quito
16:00 UTC−05:00	Mercado 11'	Report	Wila 24'	Stadium: Estadio Olímpico Atahualpa; Referee: Carlos Vera
Note: The match was played in the Estadio Olímpico Atahualpa, because LDU Quito's stadium was suspended.

May 19 Round 17	Manta	1–1	LDU Quito	Manta
12:00 UTC−05:00	Márquez 39'	Report	Garcés 76'	Stadium: Estadio Jocay; Attendance: 1,320; Referee: Roddy Zambrano

May 23 Round 18	LDU Quito	3–1	Deportivo Quevedo	Quito
19:15 UTC−05:00	Rojas 41'; Garcés 47'; Morante 77'	Report	Ladines 90+2'	Stadium: Estadio Casa Blanca; Attendance: 1,665; Referee: Mario Romero

June 15 Round 19	Emelec	0–1	LDU Quito	Guayaquil
17:00 UTC−05:00		Report	Madrid 61'	Stadium: Estadio George Capwell; Attendance: 8,567; Referee: José Luis Espinel

June 22 Round 20	LDU Quito	1–0	El Nacional	Quito
18:00 UTC−05:00	Méndez 24'	Report		Stadium: Estadio Casa Blanca; Attendance: 9,151; Referee: Miguel Hidalgo

June 26 Round 21	LDU Quito	0–2	Deportivo Cuenca	Quito
19:15 UTC−05:00		Report	Estupiñán 41'; Manso 66'	Stadium: Estadio Casa Blanca; Attendance: 3,030; Referee: Carlos Orbe

June 30 Round 22	Universidad Católica	1–2	LDU Quito	Quito
12:00 UTC−05:00	Laurito 43'	Report	Rojas 19'; Feraud 49'	Stadium: Estadio Olímpico Atahualpa; Attendance: 1,188; Referee: Omar Ponce

==== Second stage ====
Pos	Team	Pld	W	D	L	GF	GA	GD	Pts
7	LDU Loja	22	7	8	7	28	22	+6	29
8	Manta	22	7	6	9	21	27	−6	27
9	LDU Quito	22	5	10	7	22	22	0	25
10	Deportivo Cuenca	22	4	10	8	29	32	−3	22
11	Deportivo Quevedo	22	6	4	12	18	34	−16	22

Overall								Home						Away					
Pld	W	D	L	GF	GA	GD	Pts	W	D	L	GF	GA	GD	W	D	L	GF	GA	GD
22	5	10	7	22	22	0	25	3	5	3	14	15	−1	2	5	4	8	7	+1

July 7 Round 1	LDU Quito	0–3	Universidad Católica	Quito
11:30 UTC−05:00		Report	Mendoza 44'; Benítez 55', 66'	Stadium: Estadio Casa Blanca; Attendance: 2,950; Referee: Samuel Haro

July 12 Round 2	Deportivo Cuenca	0–3	LDU Quito	Cuenca
20:00 UTC−05:00		Report	Santana 33'; Benítez 46'; Mercado 75'	Stadium: Estadio Alejandro Serrano Aguilar; Attendance: 8,894; Referee: Roddy Zambrano

July 17 Round 3	El Nacional	1–0	LDU Quito	Quito
19:30 UTC−05:00	Villacrés 12'	Report		Stadium: Estadio Olímpico Atahualpa; Attendance: 11,040; Referee: Carlos Vera

July 21 Round 4	LDU Quito	2–2	Barcelona	Quito
11:30 UTC−05:00	Bou 57' (pen.), 61'	Report	Arroyo 58', 79' (pen.)	Stadium: Estadio Casa Blanca; Attendance: 7,998; Referee: Diego Lara

July 26 Round 5	Deportivo Quevedo	0–0	LDU Quito	Quevedo
19:45 UTC−05:00		Report		Stadium: Estadio 7 de Octubre; Attendance: 5,630; Referee: Omar Ponce

August 4 Round 6	LDU Quito	0–1	Manta	Quito
11:30 UTC−05:00		Report	Méndez 74'	Stadium: Estadio Casa Blanca; Attendance: 8,228; Referee: José Luis Espinel

August 11 Round 7	LDU Loja	1–1	LDU Quito	Loja
15:00 UTC−05:00	Fábio Renato 41'	Report	Bou 55'	Stadium: Estadio Federativo Reina del Cisne; Attendance: 6,525; Referee: Roddy Zambrano

August 17 Round 8	LDU Quito	2–2	Independiente José Terán	Quito
18:00 UTC−05:00	Ayoví 67', 82' (pen.)	Report	Solís 17'; Sornoza 20' (pen.)	Stadium: Estadio Casa Blanca; Attendance: 2,674; Referee: Juan Albarracín

August 24 Round 9	Deportivo Quito	0–0	LDU Quito	Quito
16:00 UTC−05:00		Report		Stadium: Estadio Olímpico Atahualpa; Attendance: 9,486; Referee: Carlos Vera

September 15 Round 11	Macará	1–3	LDU Quito	Ambato
12:45 UTC−05:00	Endara 77'	Report	Méndez 15' (pen.); Ayoví 58'; Bou 90'	Stadium: Estadio Bellavista; Attendance: 2,941; Referee: Omar Ponce

September 18 Round 10	LDU Quito	1–1	Emelec	Quito
12:00 UTC−05:00	Canuto 47'	Report	Gaibor 73'	Stadium: Estadio Casa Blanca; Attendance: 0 Referee: Daniel Salazar

September 22 Round 12	LDU Quito	1–1	Macará	Quito
12:00 UTC−05:00	Ayoví 13'	Report	Ayoví 70'	Stadium: Estadio Casa Blanca; Attendance: 0 Referee: Miguel Hidalgo

September 28 Round 13	Emelec	0–0	LDU Quito	Guayaquil
16:00 UTC−05:00		Report		Stadium: Estadio George Capwell; Attendance: 13,506; Referee: José Luis Espinel

October 2 Round 14	LDU Quito	1–1	Deportivo Quito	Quito
19:30 UTC−05:00	Ayoví 43'	Report	Congo 63'	Stadium: Estadio Casa Blanca; Attendance: 5,299; Referee: Diego Lara

October 20 Round 15	Independiente José Terán	1–0	LDU Quito	Sangolquí
11:30 UTC−05:00	Sornoza 34' (pen.)	Report		Stadium: Estadio Rumiñahui; Attendance: 1,795; Referee: Omar Ponce

October 27 Round 16	LDU Quito	2–1	LDU Loja	Quito
11:30 UTC−05:00	Ayoví 60' (pen.); Bolaños 88'	Report	Ayala 30'	Stadium: Estadio Casa Blanca; Attendance: 2,336; Referee: Juan Albarracín

November 2 Round 17	Manta	1–1	LDU Quito	Manta
14:00 UTC−05:00	Macías 87'	Report	Canuto 72'	Stadium: Estadio Jocay; Attendance: 950; Referee: Diego Lara

November 10 Round 18	LDU Quito	3–1	Deportivo Quevedo	Quito
11:30 UTC−05:00	Ayoví 8', 90+2'; Bolaños 54'	Report	Ladines 73'	Stadium: Estadio Casa Blanca; Attendance: 2,041; Referee: Carlos Vera

November 24 Round 19	Barcelona	1–0	LDU Quito	Guayaquil
16:45 UTC−05:00	Ayoví 16'	Report		Stadium: Estadio Monumental Banco Pichincha; Attendance: 5,290; Referee: Roddy Zambrano

November 27 Round 20	LDU Quito	0–1	El Nacional	Quito
19:30 UTC−05:00		Report	Pita 66'	Stadium: Estadio Casa Blanca; Attendance: 2,494; Referee: Miguel Hidalgo

December 1 Round 21	LDU Quito	2–1	Deportivo Cuenca	Quito
11:30 UTC−05:00	Vera 45+1'; Santana 79'	Report	Ríos 42'	Stadium: Estadio Casa Blanca; Attendance: 1,411; Referee: Edgar Hinostroza

December 8 Round 22	Universidad Católica	1–0	LDU Quito	Quito
15:00 UTC−05:00	Patta 36'	Report		Stadium: Estadio Olímpico Atahualpa; Attendance: 3,235; Referee: Diego Lara

=== Copa Libertadores ===
==== Copa Libertadores squad ====
No.	Pos.	Nation	Player
1	GK	ECU	Daniel Viteri
2	DF	ECU	Norberto Araujo (captain)
3	DF	ECU	Luis Luna
4	DF	ECU	Gabriel Corozo
5	MF	ECU	Hugo Vélez
6	DF	ARG	Ignacio Canuto
7	MF	ECU	Carlos Feraud
8	MF	ECU	Patricio Urrutia
9	FW	ECU	Carlos Garcés
10	MF	ECU	Luis Saritama
11	FW	ECU	Diego Hurtado
12	MF	ECU	Francisco Rojas
13	DF	ECU	Néicer Reasco

No.	Pos.	Nation	Player
14	DF	ECU	José Madrid
15	DF	ECU	Carlos Arboleda
16	MF	ECU	Marco Mosquera
17	FW	ECU	Luis Santana
18	MF	ECU	Fernando Hidalgo
19	MF	ARG	Pablo Vitti
20	MF	PAR	Enrique Vera
21	MF	ECU	Yeison Ordóñez
22	GK	ECU	Alexander Domínguez
23	DF	ECU	Koob Hurtado
24	GK	ECU	Walter Chávez
25	DF	ECU	Eduardo Morante

LDU Quito qualified to the 2013 Copa Libertadores—their 16th participation in the continental tournament—as 3rd place of the 2012 Serie A aggregate table and were given the Ecuador 3 berth. They entered the competition in the First Stage and were placed in Match G2 with Grêmio.

==== First stage ====
Overall								Home						Away					
Pld	W	D	L	GF	GA	GD	Pts	W	D	L	GF	GA	GD	W	D	L	GF	GA	GD
2	1	0	1	1	1	0	3	1	0	0	1	0	+1	0	0	1	0	1	−1

January 23 First Stage	LDU Quito (Ecuador)	1–0	(Brazil) Grêmio	Quito, Ecuador
19:00 UTC−05:00	Feraud 75'	Report		Stadium: Estadio Casa Blanca; Referee: Wilmar Roldán (Colombia)

January 30 First Stage	Grêmio (Brazil)	1–0 (5–4 p)	(Ecuador) LDU Quito	Porto Alegre, Brazil
22:00 UTC−02:00	Elano 61'	Report		Stadium: Arena do Grêmio; Referee: Saúl Laverni (Argentina)
	Penalties
	André Lima (penalty scored); Saimon (penalty missed); Willian José (penalty scored); Pará (penalty scored); Vargas (penalty scored); Alex Telles (penalty scored)		(penalty scored) Saritama; (penalty scored) Vitti; (penalty missed) Reasco; (penalty scored) Vélez; (penalty scored) Canuto; (penalty missed) Morante

Tied 1–1 on aggregate, Grêmio won on penalties.

=== Patricio Urrutia testimonial match ===
In honor of his retirement, a testimonial match was held for long-time captain Patricio Urrutia. The match was contested between players of the 2008 Copa Libertadores winning squad, and members of the Ecuador national team. Urrutia played with each team. Important players of the 2008 Copa Libertadores squad as Claudio Bieler, Luis Bolaños, Joffre Guerrón and Diego Calderón could not participate of the match.

June 1	2008 LDU Quito	0–5	Ecuador	Quito
18:30 (UTC-5)		Report	Rojas 51' de Jesús 56'; Urrutia 76' (pen.); Colón 78', 85'	Stadium: Estadio Casa Blanca; Referee: Carlos Orbe

2008 LDU Quito:
GK	1	(Ecuador) José Francisco Cevallos
DF	2	(Ecuador) Norberto Araujo
DF	3	(Ecuador) Renán Calle
DF	23	(Ecuador) Jayro Campos
MF	4	(Ecuador) Paúl Ambrosi
MF	8	(Ecuador) Patricio Urrutia (c)
MF	11	(Ecuador) Édison Méndez^{1}
MF	15	(Ecuador) William Araujo
MF	20	(Paraguay) Enrique Vera
MF	21	(Argentina) Damián Manso
FW	16	(Ecuador) Walter Calderón^{2}
Substitutes:
GK	22	(Ecuador) Jacinto Espinoza^{2}
GK	25	(Ecuador) Daniel Viteri
DF	3	(Ecuador) Iván Hurtado^{3}
DF	13	(Ecuador) Néicer Reasco^{1}
DF	33	(Paraguay) Carlos Espínola^{2}
MF	5	(Ecuador) Pedro Larrea
MF	7	(Ecuador) Edder Vaca
MF	8	(Ecuador) Édison Méndez^{1}
MF	10	(Argentina) Ezequiel González^{2}
FW	9	(Ecuador) Agustín Delgado
FW	11	(Ecuador) Franklin Salas
FW	16	(Ecuador) Walter Calderón^{2}
Manager:
(Argentina) Edgardo Bauza

Ecuador:
GK	22	(Ecuador) Alexander Domínguez
DF	2	(Ecuador) Jorge Guagua
DF	3	(Ecuador) Frickson Erazo
DF	4	(Ecuador) Juan Carlos Paredes
DF	10	(Ecuador) Walter Ayoví (c)
MF	5	(Ecuador) Renato Ibarra
MF	6	(Ecuador) Christian Noboa
MF	14	(Ecuador) Segundo Castillo
MF	16	(Ecuador) Antonio Valencia
FW	9	(Ecuador) Jefferson Montero
FW	11	(Ecuador) Christian Benítez
Substitutes:
GK	1	(Ecuador) Máximo Banguera
DF	13	(Ecuador) Elvis Bone
DF	18	(Ecuador) Óscar Bagüí
DF	21	(Ecuador) Gabriel Achilier
MF	8	(Ecuador) Patricio Urrutia
MF	15	(Ecuador) Pedro Quiñónez
MF	19	(Ecuador) Luis Saritama
MF	20	(Ecuador) Alex Colón
FW	7	(Ecuador) Joao Rojas
FW	17	(Ecuador) Marlon de Jesús
Manager:
(Colombia) Reinaldo Rueda

Note ^{1}: Current LDU Quito player, but not part of the 2008 squad.
Note ^{2}: Former LDU Quito player, but not part of the 2008 squad.
Note ^{3}: Never played with LDU Quito.

== Player statistics ==
Num	Pos	Player	App	Goal	Yellow card	Red card	App	Goal	Yellow card	Red card	App	Goal	Yellow card	Red card
Num	Pos	Player	Serie A				Copa Libertadores				Total			
1	GK	Daniel Viteri	5	—	1	—	—	—	—	—	5	—	1	—
2	DF	Norberto Araujo	33	—	5	—	1	—	—	—	34	—	5	—
3	DF	Luis Luna	5	—	2	—	—	—	—	—	5	—	2	—
4	DF	José Madrid	28	1	7	—	1	—	—	—	29	1	7	—
5	DF	Paúl Ambrosi	5	—	2	—	—	—	—	—	5	—	2	—
6	DF	Ignacio Canuto	43	3	9	—	2	—	—	—	45	3	9	—
7	MF	Carlos Feraud	25	1	5	1	2	1	—	—	27	2	5	1
8	FW	Édison Méndez	28	5	3	3	—	—	—	—	28	5	3	3
9	FW	Carlos Garcés	24	3	2	1	2	—	—	—	26	3	2	1
10	MF	Luis Saritama	37	1	8	1	2	—	—	—	39	1	8	1
11	FW	Jaime Ayoví	15	8	5	—	—	—	—	—	15	8	5	—
12	MF	Francisco Rojas	20	2	2	—	1	—	—	—	21	2	2	—
13	DF	Néicer Reasco	23	1	1	—	2	—	—	—	25	1	1	—
14	FW	Julián Benítez	20	1	—	—	—	—	—	—	20	1	—	—
15	DF	Carlos Arboleda	24	—	4	1	1	—	—	—	25	—	4	1
16	MF	Luis Bolaños	13	2	—	—	—	—	—	—	13	2	—	—
17	MF	Luis Santana	10	2	—	—	—	—	—	—	10	2	—	—
18	MF	Fernando Hidalgo	38	1	14	—	2	—	—	—	40	1	14	—
19	FW	Gustavo Bou	20	4	1	—	—	—	—	—	20	4	1	—
20	MF	Enrique Vera	24	1	8	3	2	—	2	—	26	1	10	3
21	MF	Hugo Vélez	12	—	3	—	1	—	—	—	13	—	3	—
22	GK	Alexander Domínguez	39	—	7	1	2	—	—	—	41	—	7	1
23	DF	Koob Hurtado	11	—	2	1	1	—	—	1	12	—	2	2
24	GK	Walter Chávez	—	—	—	—	—	—	—	—	—	—	—	—
25	DF	Eduardo Morante	12	1	4	2	2	—	1	—	14	1	5	2
30	MF	Romario Ibarra	7	—	1	—	—	—	—	—	7	—	1	—
51	DF	Gabriel Corozo	40	—	10	—	—	—	—	—	40	—	10	—
52	FW	Diego Hurtado	3	—	—	—	—	—	—	—	3	—	—	—
54	FW	Kevin Mercado	7	2	1	—	—	—	—	—	7	2	1	—
—	MF	Yeison Ordóñez	—	—	—	—	—	—	—	—	—	—	—	—
—	MF	Marco Posligua	—	—	—	—	—	—	—	—	—	—	—	—
8	MF	Patricio Urrutia	2	—	—	—	1	—	—	—	3	—	—	—
16	MF	Marco Mosquera	10	—	1	1	—	—	—	—	10	—	1	1
19	MF	Pablo Vitti	20	7	1	—	2	—	—	—	22	7	1	—
21	FW	Federico Puppo	13	2	—	—	—	—	—	—	13	2	—	—
Totals			—	48	109	15	—	1	3	1	—	49	112	16

Last updated: December 8, 2013
Note: Players in italics left the club mid-season.

== Team statistics ==
	Total	Home	Away
Games played	46	23	23
Games won	18	11	7
Games drawn	15	6	9
Games lost	13	6	7
Biggest win	3–0 vs Macará; 3–0 vs Deportivo Cuenca	2–0 vs Manta; 3–1 vs Deportivo Quevedo; 3–1 vs Deportivo Quevedo	3–0 vs Macará; 3–0 vs Deportivo Cuenca
Biggest loss	0–3 vs Barcelona; 0–3 vs Universidad Católica	0–3 vs Universidad Católica	0–3 vs Barcelona
Biggest win (League)	3–0 vs Macará; 3–0 vs Deportivo Cuenca	2–0 vs Manta; 3–1 vs Deportivo Quevedo; 3–1 vs Deportivo Quevedo	3–0 vs Macará; 3–0 vs Deportivo Cuenca
Biggest win (South America)	1–0 vs Grêmio	1–0 vs Grêmio	
Biggest loss (League)	0–3 vs Barcelona; 0–3 vs Universidad Católica	0–3 vs Universidad Católica	0–3 vs Barcelona
Biggest loss (South America)	0–1 vs Grêmio		0–1 vs Grêmio
Clean sheets	15	5	10
Goals scored	49	30	19
Goals conceded	42	26	16
Goal difference	+7	+4	+3
Average GF per game	1.07	1.3	0.83
Average GA per game	0.91	1.13	0.7
Yellow cards	112	57	55
Red cards	16	5	11
Most appearances	(Argentina) Ignacio Canuto (45)	(Argentina) Ignacio Canuto (22)	(Argentina) Ignacio Canuto (23) (Ecuador) Alexander Domínguez (23)
Most minutes played	(Argentina) Ignacio Canuto (3970)	(Argentina) Ignacio Canuto (1948)	(Ecuador) Alexander Domínguez (2057)
Top scorer	(Ecuador) Jaime Ayoví (8)	(Ecuador) Jaime Ayoví (7)	(Argentina) Gustavo Bou (2) (Argentina) Ignacio Canuto (2) (Ecuador) Carlos Garcés (2) (Ecuador) Édison Méndez (2) (Argentina) Pablo Vitti (2)
Worst discipline	(Paraguay) Enrique Vera (3) (red card) (Ecuador) Édison Méndez (3) (red card)	(Ecuador) Édison Méndez (2) (red card)	(Paraguay) Enrique Vera (3) (red card)
Penalties for	6/8 (75%)	5/5 (100%)	1/3 (33.33%)
Penalties against	5/6 (83.33%)	2/2 (100%)	3/4 (75%)
Points	69/138 (50%)	39/69 (56.52%)	30/69 (43.48%)
Winning rate	39.13%	47.83%	30.43%

Last updated: December 8, 2013 Source:Competitive matches
