= 2013 in Ecuadorian football =

Football in Ecuador
- Season: 2013

Men's football
- Primera División: Emelec

The 2013 season is the 91st season of competitive football in Ecuador.

== Clubs in international competition ==
Team	2013 Copa Libertadores	2013 Copa Sudamericana
Barcelona	Eliminated in the Second Stage	Enters in the First Stage
Emelec	Eliminated in the Round of 16	Enters in the First Stage
Independiente José Terán	N/A	Enters in the First Stage
LDU Loja	N/A	Enters in the First Stage
LDU Quito	Eliminated in the First Stage	N/A

=== Barcelona ===
==== Copa Libertadores ====
===== Group 1 =====
Second Stage: Group 1
Pos	Team	Pld	W	D	L	GF	GA	GD	Pts
1	(Uruguay) Nacional	6	3	1	2	10	6	+4	10
2	(Argentina) Boca Juniors	6	3	0	3	7	7	0	9
3	(Mexico) Toluca	6	2	2	2	8	11	−3	8
4	(Ecuador) Barcelona	6	1	3	2	5	6	−1	6

February 12	Nacional (Uruguay)	2–2	(Ecuador) Barcelona	Montevideo, Uruguay
20:15 UTC−2	Abreu 69'; Alonso 90+3'	Report	D. Díaz 18'; Nahuelpan 26'	Stadium: Estadio Gran Parque Central; Referee: Enrique Osses (Chile)

February 27	Barcelona (Ecuador)	1–2	(Argentina) Boca Juniors	Guayaquil, Ecuador
17:45 UTC−5	Arroyo 90+3' (pen.)	Report	Martínez 59'; Pérez 63'	Stadium: Estadio Monumental Isidro Romero Carbo; Referee: Leandro Vuaden (Brazil)

March 6	Toluca (Mexico)	1–1	(Ecuador) Barcelona	Toluca, Mexico
21:15 UTC−6	Tejada 83'	Report	D. Díaz 36'	Stadium: Estadio Nemesio Díez; Referee: Héber Lopes (Brazil)

March 13	Barcelona (Ecuador)	0–0	(Mexico) Toluca	Guayaquil, Ecuador
17:45 UTC−5		Report		Stadium: Estadio Monumental Isidro Romero Carbo; Referee: Enrique Cáceres (Paraguay)

April 3	Boca Juniors (Argentina)	1–0	(Ecuador) Barcelona	Buenos Aires, Argentina
19:45 UTC−3	Blandi 9'	Report		Stadium: Estadio Alberto J. Armando; Referee: Ricardo Marques (Brazil)

April 17	Barcelona (Ecuador)	1–0	(Uruguay) Nacional	Guayaquil, Ecuador
17:45 UTC−5	Castillejos 37'	Report		Stadium: Estadio Monumental Isidro Romero Carbo; Referee: Antonio Arias (Paraguay)

=== Emelec ===
==== Copa Libertadores ====
===== Group 4 =====
Second Stage: Group 4
Pos	Team	Pld	W	D	L	GF	GA	GD	Pts
1	(Argentina) Vélez Sarsfield	6	4	1	1	10	3	+7	13
2	(Ecuador) Emelec	6	3	1	2	5	4	+1	10
3	(Uruguay) Peñarol	6	3	0	3	7	7	0	9
4	(Chile) Iquique	6	1	0	5	5	13	−8	3

February 12	Emelec (Ecuador)	1–0	(Argentina) Vélez Sársfield	Guayaquil, Ecuador
19:30 UTC−5	Ferreyra 50' (o.g.)	Report		Stadium: Estadio George Capwell; Referee: Wilmar Roldán (Colombia)

February 19	Peñarol (Uruguay)	1–0	(Ecuador) Emelec	Montevideo, Uruguay
20:15 UTC−2	Olivera 68'	Report		Stadium: Estadio Centenario; Referee: Sandro Ricci (Brazil)

February 27	Iquique (Chile)	2–0	(Ecuador) Emelec	Iquique, Chile
19:45 UTC−3	Ereros 15'; Villalobos 22'	Report		Stadium: Estadio Tierra de Campeones; Referee: Víctor Carrillo (Peru)

March 5	Emelec (Ecuador)	2–1	(Chile) Iquique	Guayaquil, Ecuador
21:45 UTC−5	De Jesús 57'; Angulo 75'	Report	Villalobos 79'	Stadium: Estadio George Capwell; Referee: Roberto García (Mexico)

April 2	Emelec (Ecuador)	2–0	(Uruguay) Peñarol	Guayaquil, Ecuador
21:45 UTC−5	Nasuti 81'; Gaibor 90+4'	Report		Stadium: Estadio George Capwell; Referee: Hernando Buitrago (Colombia)

April 9	Vélez Sársfield (Argentina)	0–0	(Ecuador) Emelec	Buenos Aires, Argentina
19:15 UTC−3		Report		Stadium: Estadio José Amalfitani; Referee: Marcelo Henrique (Brazil)

===== Round of 16: Match F =====
May 2	Emelec (Ecuador)	2–1	(Brazil) Fluminense	Guayaquil, Ecuador
20:30 UTC−5	Euzébio 33' (o.g.); Gaibor 87' (pen.)	Report	Wágner 44'	Stadium: Estadio George Capwell; Referee: Wilmar Roldán (Colombia)

May 8	Fluminense (Brazil)	2–0	(Ecuador) Emelec	Rio de Janeiro, Brazil
22:00 UTC−3	Fred 29'; Carlinhos 86'	Report		Stadium: Estádio São Januário; Referee: Víctor Carrillo (Peru)

=== LDU Quito ===
==== Copa Libertadores ====
===== First stage =====
January 23	LDU Quito (Ecuador)	1–0	(Brazil) Grêmio	Quito. Ecuador
19:00 UTC−5	Feraud 76'	Report		Stadium: Estadio Casa Blanca; Referee: Wilmar Roldán (Colombia)

January 30	Grêmio (Brazil)	1–0 (5–4 p)	(Ecuador) LDU Quito	Porto Alegre, Brazil
22:00 UTC−2	Elano 62'	Report		Stadium: Arena do Grêmio; Attendance: 41,461; Referee: Saúl Laverni (Argentina)
	Penalties
	Lima (penalty scored); Saimon (penalty missed); Willian José (penalty scored); Pará (penalty scored); Vargas (penalty scored); Telles (penalty scored)		(penalty scored) Saritama; (penalty scored) Vitti; (penalty missed) Reasco; (penalty scored) Vélez; (penalty scored) Canuto; (penalty missed) Morante

== National teams ==
=== Senior team ===
==== 2014 FIFA World Cup qualification ====
Pos	Team	Pld	W	D	L	GF	GA	GD	Pts	Qualification
1	Argentina	16	9	5	2	35	15	+20	32	2014 FIFA World Cup
2	Colombia	16	9	3	4	27	13	+14	30	2014 FIFA World Cup
3	Chile	16	9	1	6	29	25	+4	28	2014 FIFA World Cup
4	Ecuador	16	7	4	5	20	16	+4	25	2014 FIFA World Cup
5	Uruguay	16	7	4	5	25	25	0	25	Inter-confederation play-offs
6	Venezuela	16	5	5	6	14	20	−6	20	
7	Peru	16	4	3	9	17	26	−9	15	
8	Bolivia	16	2	6	8	17	30	−13	12	
9	Paraguay	16	3	3	10	17	31	−14	12	

Source: FIFA

March 26 Matchday 12	Ecuador	4–1	Paraguay	Quito, Ecuador
16:00 UTC-5	Caicedo 37'; Montero 49', 74'; Benítez 54'		Caballero 18'	Stadium: Estadio Olímpico Atahualpa; Attendance: 33,048; Referee: Sandro Ricci (Brazil)

June 7 Matchday 13	Peru	v	Ecuador	Lima, Peru
21:10 UTC-5				Stadium: Estadio Nacional

June 11 Matchday 14	Ecuador	v	Argentina	Quito, Ecuador
16:00 UTC-5				Stadium: Estadio Olimpico Atahualpa

September 6 Matchday 15	Colombia	v	Ecuador

September 10 Matchday 16	Bolivia	v	Ecuador

October 11 Matchday 17	Ecuador	v	Uruguay	Quito, Ecuador
				Stadium: Estadio Olimpico Atahualpa

October 15 Matchday 18	Chile	v	Ecuador	Santiago, Chile
				Stadium: Estadio Nacional

==== Friendlies ====
February 6	Portugal	2–3	Ecuador	Guimaraes, Portugal
20:45 UTC-03	Ronaldo 22'; Postiga 60'		Valencia 2'; Pereira 61' (o.g.); Caicedo 70'	Stadium: Estádio D. Afonso Henriques

March 21	Ecuador	5–0	El Salvador	Quito, Ecuador
16:00 UTC-05	Caicedo 18, 46'; Benítez 35'; Montero 64'; Rojas 90'			Stadium: Estadio Olimpico Atahualpa

May 29	Ecuador	v	Germany	Boca Raton, Florida, United States
				Stadium: FAU Stadium

August 15	Ecuador	v	Spain	Guayaquil, Ecuador

=== U-20 team ===
==== South American Youth Championship ====
Group B
Team	Pld	W	D	L	GF	GA	GD	Pts
Peru	4	2	1	1	7	5	+2	7
Uruguay	4	1	3	0	10	9	+1	6
Ecuador	4	1	2	1	5	5	0	5
Venezuela	4	1	1	2	3	4	−1	4
Brazil	4	1	1	2	4	6	−2	4

January 10 First Stage	Brazil	1–1	Ecuador	San Juan, Argentina
20:00UTC−03:00	León 38' (o.g.)	Report	Parrales 28'	Stadium: Estadio del Bicentenario; Attendance: 500; Referee: José Buitrago (Colombia)

January 12 First Stage	Ecuador	0–1	Venezuela	San Juan, Argentina
22:15UTC−03:00		Report	Martínez 28'	Stadium: Estadio del Bicentenario; Attendance: 300; Referee: Raúl Orosco (Bolivia)

January 14 First Stage	Uruguay	2–2	Ecuador	San Juan, Argentina
22:15UTC−03:00	López 19'; Aguirre 85'	Report	Esterilla 46'; Grueso 55'	Stadium: Estadio del Bicentenario; Attendance: 1,000; Referee: José Buitrago (Colombia)

January 16 First Stage	Ecuador	2–1	Peru	San Juan, Argentina
22:15UTC−03:00	Esterilla 79'; Cevallos 83'	Report	Deza 65' (pen.)	Stadium: Estadio del Bicentenario; Attendance: 1,200; Referee: Enrique Cáceres (Paraguay)

Final stage
Team	Pld	W	D	L	GF	GA	GD	Pts
Colombia	5	4	0	1	6	3	+3	12
Paraguay	5	3	1	1	7	4	+3	10
Uruguay	5	3	0	2	5	3	+2	9
Chile	5	2	1	2	7	6	+1	7
Peru	5	1	2	2	6	8	−2	5
Ecuador	5	0	0	5	4	11	−7	0

January 20	Colombia	2–1	Ecuador	Mendoza, Argentina
22:00	Nieto 50'; Quintero 70'		Parrales 85'	Stadium: Estadio Malvinas Argentinas; Attendance: 1,000; Referee: Enrique Cáceres (Paraguay)

January 23	Chile	4–1	Ecuador	Mendoza, Argentina
17:30	Castillo 18'; Rubio 28' (pen.); Baeza 75'; Mora 83'		Esterilla 69'	Stadium: Estadio Malvinas Argentinas; Attendance: 3,000; Referee: Víctor Hugo Carrillo (Peru)

January 27	Paraguay	1–0	Ecuador	Mendoza, Argentina
22:00	Villamayor 86'			Stadium: Estadio Malvinas Argentinas; Attendance: 1,000; Referee: José Buitrago (Colombia)

January 30	Peru	3–2	Ecuador	Mendoza, Argentina
19:45	Reyna 28', 34'; Polo 83'		Uchuari 52'; Esterilla 70'	Stadium: Estadio Malvinas Argentinas; Attendance: 2,000; Referee: Marlon Escalante (Venezuela)

February 3	Uruguay	1–0	Ecuador	Mendoza, Argentina
17:15	López 5'			Stadium: Estadio Malvinas Argentinas; Attendance: 7,000; Referee: José Buitrago (Colombia)
