= 2013 Copa Libertadores first stage =

The first stage of the 2013 Copa Libertadores de América was played from January 22 to January 31, 2013. A total of 12 teams competed in the first stage.

== Draw ==
The draw of the tournament was held on December 21, 2012, 11:00 UTC−3, at the CONMEBOL Convention Centre in Luque, Paraguay.

For the first stage, the 12 teams were drawn into six ties containing a team from Pot 1 and a team from Pot 2, with the former hosting the second leg in three ties, and the latter hosting the second leg in the other three ties. The seeding of each team was determined by which associations reached the furthest stage in the previous Copa Libertadores.

== Seeding ==
The following were the seeding of the 12 teams entered into the first stage draw:

| Pot 1 | Pot 2 |
|---|---|
| (Argentina) Tigre (Brazil) Grêmio (Brazil) São Paulo (Chile) Iquique (Colombia) Deportes Tolima (Paraguay) Olimpia | (Bolivia) Bolívar (Ecuador) LDU Quito (Mexico) León (Peru) Universidad César Vallejo (Uruguay) Defensor Sporting (Venezuela) Deportivo Anzoátegui |

== Format ==
In the first stage, each tie was played on a home-and-away two-legged basis. If tied on aggregate, the away goals rule was used. If still tied, the penalty shoot-out was used to determine the winner (no extra time was played). The winners of each tie advanced to the second stage to join the 26 automatic qualifiers.

== Matches ==
The first legs were played on January 22–24, and the second legs were played on January 29–31, 2013.

| Team 1 | Agg. | Team 2 | 1st leg | 2nd leg |
|---|---|---|---|---|
| Tigre (Argentina) | 5–1 | (Venezuela) Deportivo Anzoátegui | 2–1 | 3–0 |
| LDU Quito (Ecuador) | 1–1 (4–5 p) | (Brazil) Grêmio | 1–0 | 0–1 |
| Deportes Tolima (Colombia) | 2–1 | (Peru) Universidad César Vallejo | 1–0 | 1–1 |
| Defensor Sporting (Uruguay) | 0–2 | (Paraguay) Olimpia | 0–0 | 0–2 |
| São Paulo (Brazil) | 8–4 | (Bolivia) Bolívar | 5–0 | 3–4 |
| León (Mexico) | 2–2 (2–4 p) | (Chile) Iquique | 1–1 | 1–1 |

=== Match G1 ===
January 22, 2013
20:15 UTC−3

| Tigre (Argentina) | 2–1 | (Venezuela) Deportivo Anzoátegui |
|---|---|---|
| Peñalba 66'; Leguizamón 76' | Report | Caggiano 38' |

Estadio José Dellagiovanna, Victoria
Referee: Carlos Amarilla (Paraguay)

January 29, 2013
17:45 UTC−4:30

| Deportivo Anzoátegui (Venezuela) | 0–3 | (Argentina) Tigre |
|---|---|---|
| | Report | Botta 8'; Santander 74'; Maggiolo 88' |

Estadio José Antonio Anzoátegui, Puerto la Cruz
Referee: Martín Vázquez (Uruguay)

Tigre won 5–1 on aggregate.

=== Match G2 ===
January 23, 2013
19:00 UTC−5

| LDU Quito (Ecuador) | 1–0 | (Brazil) Grêmio |
|---|---|---|
| Feraud 76' | Report |

Estadio Casa Blanca, Quito
Referee: Wilmar Roldán (Colombia)

January 30, 2013
22:00 UTC−2

| Grêmio (Brazil) | 1–0 | (Ecuador) LDU Quito |
|---|---|---|
| Elano 62' | Report |
Penalties
| André Lima (penalty scored); Saimon (penalty missed); Willian José (penalty scored); Pará (penalty scored); Vargas (penalty scored); Alex Telles (penalty scored) | 5–4 | (penalty scored) Saritama; (penalty scored) Vitti; (penalty missed) Reasco; (penalty scored) Vélez; (penalty scored) Canuto; (penalty missed) Morante |

Arena do Grêmio, Porto Alegre
Attendance: 41,461
Referee: Saúl Laverni (Argentina)

Tied 1–1 on aggregate, Grêmio won on penalties.

=== Match G3 ===
January 24, 2013
19:15 UTC−5

| Deportes Tolima (Colombia) | 1–0 | (Peru) Universidad César Vallejo |
|---|---|---|
| Leichtweis 58' | Report |

Estadio Manuel Murillo Toro, Ibagué
Referee: Juan Soto (Venezuela)

January 31, 2013
19:45 UTC−5

| Universidad César Vallejo (Peru) | 1–1 | (Colombia) Deportes Tolima |
|---|---|---|
| Quinteros 45' | Report | Monsalvo 86' |

Estadio Mansiche, Trujillo
Referee: Leandro Vuaden (Brazil)

Deportes Tolima won 2–1 on aggregate.

=== Match G4 ===
January 24, 2013
20:00 UTC−2

| Defensor Sporting (Uruguay) | 0–0 | (Paraguay) Olimpia |
|---|---|---|
| | Report |

Estadio Luis Franzini, Montevideo
Referee: Diego Abal (Argentina)

January 31, 2013
19:15 UTC−3

| Olimpia (Paraguay) | 2–0 | (Uruguay) Defensor Sporting |
|---|---|---|
| Ferreyra 35'; Aranda 60' | Report |

Estadio Defensores del Chaco, Asunción
Referee: Héber Lopes (Brazil)

Olimpia won 2–0 on aggregate.

=== Match G5 ===
January 23, 2013
22:00 UTC−2

| São Paulo (Brazil) | 5–0 | (Bolivia) Bolívar |
|---|---|---|
| Osvaldo 8'; Luís Fabiano 21', 45+2'; Jádson 60'; Rogério Ceni 63' (pen.) | Report |

Estádio do Morumbi, São Paulo
Attendance: 41,838
Referee: Roberto Silvera (Uruguay)

January 30, 2013
20:00 UTC−4

| Bolívar (Bolivia) | 4–3 | (Brazil) São Paulo |
|---|---|---|
| Ferreira 38', 75' (pen.); Cabrera 59', 69' | Report | Luís Fabiano 2'; Jádson 16'; Osvaldo 35' |

Estadio Hernando Siles, La Paz
Referee: Wilmar Roldán (Colombia)

São Paulo won 8–4 on aggregate.

=== Match G6 ===
January 22, 2013
19:45 UTC−6

| León (Mexico) | 1–1 | (Chile) Iquique |
|---|---|---|
| Maz 88' | Report | Díaz 4' |

Estadio León, León
Referee: Héber Lopes (Brazil)

January 29, 2013
22:00 UTC−3

| Iquique (Chile) | 1–1 | (Mexico) León |
|---|---|---|
| Díaz 58' (pen.) | Report | Arrechea 47' |
Penalties
| Zenteno (penalty scored); Villalobos (penalty scored); Ereros (penalty scored); Grabinski (penalty missed); Díaz (penalty scored) | 4–2 | (penalty missed) Burbano; (penalty missed) Montes; (penalty scored) Vázquez; (penalty scored) Arrechea |

Estadio Tierra de Campeones, Iquique
Referee: Antonio Arias (Paraguay)

Tied 2–2 on aggregate, Iquique won on penalties.
