= Charles Thorn =

American theoretical physicist

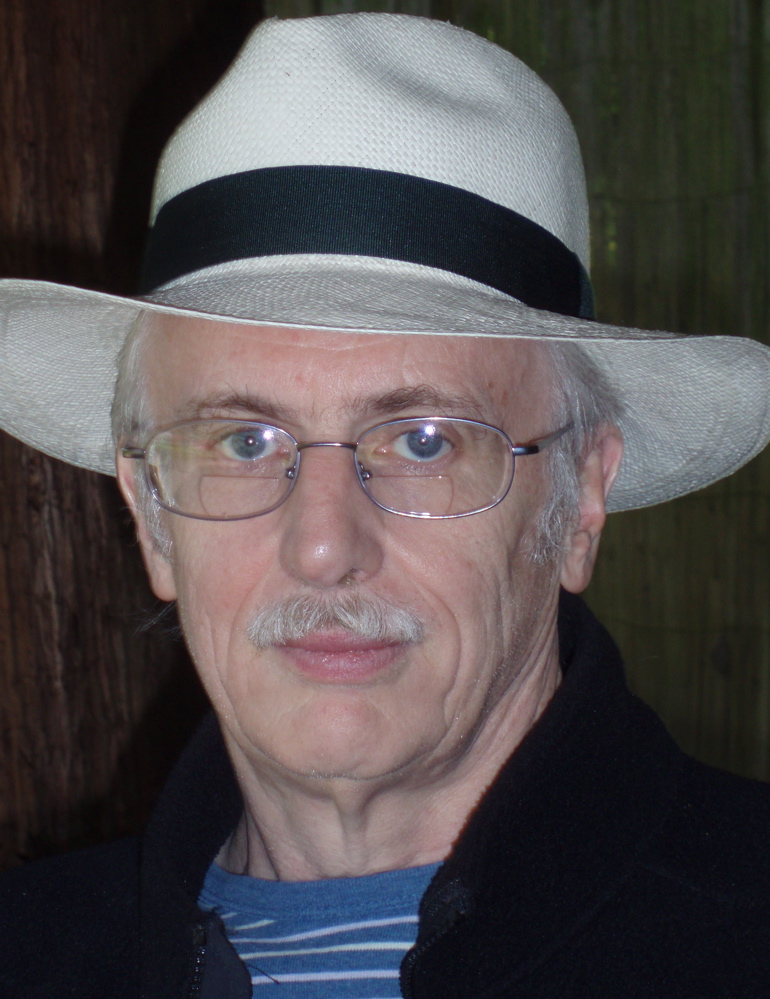
- Born: 14 August 1946 (age 80); Washington, Indiana, US
- Education: Massachusetts Institute of Technology; University of California, Berkeley
- Awards: Jesse W. Beams Medal, 2005; Dannie Heineman Prize for Mathematical Physics (2026)
- Scientific career
- Fields: Physics
- Workplaces: University of Florida
- Doctoral advisor: Stanley Mandelstam
- Doctoral students: Jian Qiu; Francisco Rojas; Sourav Raha

Charles Thorn (born 14 August 1946) is an American physicist who is a Professor of Physics at University of Florida in Gainesville, Florida. He played an important role in the development of dual models and string theory. Among his contributions is the proof of the non-existence of ghosts in string theory. The Goddard–Thorn theorem is a result about certain vector spaces in string theory. Thorn developed it with Peter Goddard.

== Education and personal life ==
Thorn obtained his undergraduate degree in physics at Massachusetts Institute of Technology (MIT) and completed his Ph.D. in physics from University of California, Berkeley in 1971 under the supervision of Stanley Mandelstam. He has held postdoctoral positions at MIT and CERN. He is fond of tango dancing.

== Research ==
Charles Thorn also has developed an approach to string theory based on the idea of string bits. This idea led him to the conclusion that in this formalism one of the dimensions of spacetime appears to be dynamic. The fundamental degrees of freedom propagated on a surface in one lower dimension thus giving a holographic theory.

He was elected a Fellow of the American Physical Society in 1989 "For important contributions to the theory of elementary particles. Nominated by: Division of Particles and Fields".
