= Francisco Rojas =

Francisco Rojas may refer to:

- Francisco Rojas Aravena (born 1949) Chilean political scientist
- Francisco Rojas Bravo (1835–1906), Chilean farmer and politician
- Francisco Rojas (footballer, born 1974), Chilean association football player
- Francisco Rojas (footballer, born 1991), Ecuadorian association football player
- Francisco Rojas González (1903–1951), Mexican writer
- Francisco Rojas Gutiérrez (1944–2025), Mexican politician
- Francisco Rojas San Román (1958–2018), Mexican politician
- Francisco Rojas Soto (born 1950), Paraguayan Olympic runner
- Francisco Rojas Toledo (born 1956), Mexican politician
- Francisco Rojas Tollinchi (1911–1965), Puerto Rican poet, civic leader and journalist
- Francisco Rojas Villegas (1909–1993), Chilean medical doctor and politician
- Francisco de Rojas Zorrilla (1607–1648), Spanish dramatist

== See also ==
- Francisca Rojas (born 1865), Argentine murderer
