= Kevin Mercado =

Ecuadorian footballer (born 1995)

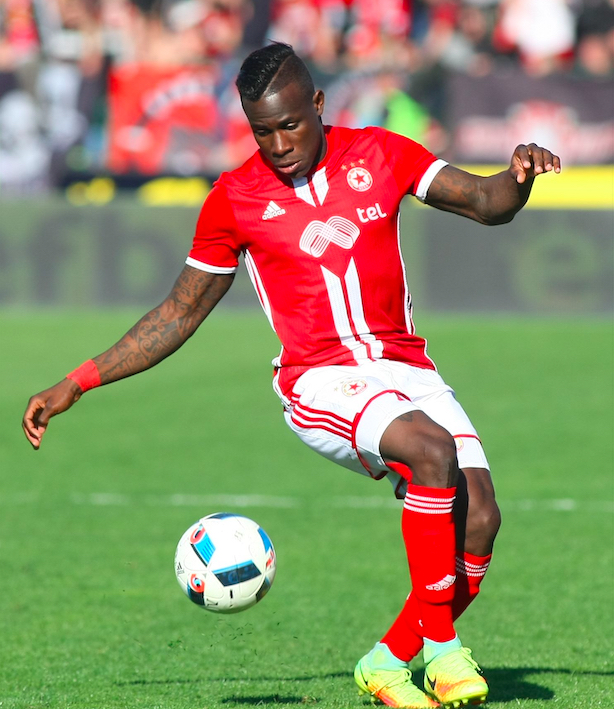
- Mercado in 2017

Personal information
- Full name: Kevin Bryan Mercado Lima
- Date of birth: January 28, 1995 (age 31)
- Place of birth: Guayaquil, Ecuador
- Height: 1.72 m (5 ft 8 in)
- Positions: Winger; forward

Team information
- Current team: Nacional

Youth career
- 2005–2011: Academía Alfaro Moreno
- 2011–2012: LDU Quito

Senior career*
Years	Team	Apps	(Gls)
2012–2014	LDU Quito	20	(2)
2014–2018	Granada B	7	(0)
2015	→ Godoy Cruz (loan)	15	(1)
2016	→ CA Sarmiento (loan)	23	(0)
2017–2018	→ CSKA Sofia (loan)	29	(2)
2018	→ Universidad Católica (loan)	28	(3)
2019–2022	Necaxa	40	(0)
2021–2022	→ L.D.U. Quito (loan)	4	(1)
2022–2023	Delfín S.C.	11	(0)
2023–2024	Club Deportivo El Nacional	6	(0)
2024	Guayaquil City F.C.	15	(2)
2025	Maricá Futebol Clube	4	(0)
2025	AA Portuguesa		
2026–	Nacional	8	(0)

International career
2011	Ecuador U17	11	(2)
2014–2015	Ecuador U20	6	(1)
- * Club domestic league appearances and goals as of 19 November 2026

Kevin Bryan Mercado Lima (born 28 January 1995) is an Ecuadorian professional footballer for Nacional who plays as a forward.

== Club career ==
Born in Guayaquil, Mercado joined Academía Alfaro Moreno in 2005, aged ten. In 2011, he moved to giants LDU Quito, initially assigned to the youth setup.

On 11 August 2012, Mercado played his first match as a professional, coming on as a second-half substitute in a 0–0 away draw against Técnico Universitario, for the Ecuadorian Serie A championship. He scored his first professional goal on 12 May of the following year, netting his side's only in a 1–1 home draw against LDU Loja.

On 25 July 2014, Mercado and teammate Gabriel Corozo joined Granada CF, being assigned to the reserves in Segunda División B. On 13 February of the following year he was loaned to Godoy Cruz, until December.

On 7 December 2015, it was confirmed, that Mercado had signed a loan deal with CA Sarmiento, short after his return from another loan move.

On 2 February 2017 his loan to Sarmiento was ended and he was sent on loan to Bulgarian club CSKA Sofia for 1 year.

== Career statistics ==
As of match played 19 September 2021

Club	Season	League			Cup		Other		Total	
Club	Season	Division	Apps	Goals	Apps	Goals	Apps	Goals	Apps	Goals
L.D.U. Quito	2012	Ecuadorian Serie A	5	0	0	0	—		5	0
L.D.U. Quito	2013	Ecuadorian Serie A	7	2	0	0	—		7	2
L.D.U. Quito	2014	Ecuadorian Serie A	8	0	0	0	—		8	0
L.D.U. Quito	Total		20	2	0	0	0	0	20	2
Granada II	2014–15	Segunda División B	7	0	0	0	—		7	0
Godoy Cruz (loan)	2015	Argentine Primera División	15	1	1	0	—		16	1
Sarmiento (loan)	2016	Argentine Primera División	11	0	1	0	—		12	0
Sarmiento (loan)	2016–17	Argentine Primera División	12	0	0	0	—		12	0
Sarmiento (loan)	Total		23	0	1	0	0	0	24	0
CSKA Sofia (loan)	2016–17	First Professional Football League	14	1	0	0	—		14	1
CSKA Sofia (loan)	2017–18	First Professional Football League	15	1	3	0	—		18	1
CSKA Sofia (loan)	Total		29	2	3	0	0	0	32	2
Universidad Católica (loan)	2018	Ecuadorian Serie A	28	3	0	0	—		28	3
Necaxa	2018–19	Liga MX	7	0	2	0	—		9	0
Necaxa	2019–20	Liga MX	22	0	3	0	1	0	26	0
Necaxa	2020–21	Liga MX	11	0	—		—		11	0
Necaxa	Total		40	0	5	0	1	0	46	0
L.D.U. Quito (loan)	2021	Ecuadorian Serie A	4	1	—		3	0	7	1
Career total			166	9	10	0	4	0	180	9
