= Gabriel Corozo =

Ecuadorian footballer (born 1995)

Personal information
- Full name: Gabriel Eduardo Corozo Vásquez
- Date of birth: 5 January 1995 (age 31)
- Place of birth: Guayaquil, Ecuador
- Height: 1.69 m (5 ft 7 in)
- Position: Right-back

Team information
- Current team: Lincoln Red Imps
- Number: 27

Youth career
- 2005–2012: Academía Alfaro Moreno
- 2012: → LDU Quito (loan)

Senior career*
Years	Team	Apps	(Gls)
2012	Academía Alfaro Moreno	0	(0)
2012	→ LDU Quito (loan)	3	(0)
2013–2014	LDU Quito	48	(0)
2014	Udinese	0	(0)
2014–2018	Granada B	80	(0)
2017–2018	→ Elche (loan)	0	(0)
2019–2020	Cádiz B	0	(0)
2020	LDU Portoviejo	6	(0)
2021	C.D. Olmedo	13	(0)
2021-2022	Delfín	8	(0)
2022	Orense	20	(0)
2023–2024	Lincoln Red Imps	1	(0)
- * Club domestic league appearances and goals as of 22:21, 24 September 2023 (UTC)

Gabriel Eduardo Corozo Vásquez (born 5 January 1995) is an Ecuadorian professional footballer who plays for Gibraltar Football League club Lincoln Red Imps. Mainly a right-back, he can also play as a centre back and defensive midfielder.

== Club career ==
Born in Guayaquil, Corozo joined Academía Alfaro Moreno in 2005, aged ten. In 2012, he moved to LDU Quito, in a season-long loan deal.

Corozo made his professional debut on 25 November 2012, replacing Ángel Cheme in the 79th minute of a 1–0 away win against CD Olmedo. He appeared in two further matches during the campaign, and was later bought outright.

Corozo scored his first senior goal on 15 September 2013, netting his side's second in a 3–1 win at CSyD Macará. He was an ever-present figure in the season, contributing with 40 appearances.

On 18 December 2013, Corozo signed a deal with Udinese Calcio, buying 25% of Corozo's sports rights. He would join Udinese for the second half of 2014. However, on 25 July 2014 he and LDU teammate Kevin Mercado joined Granada CF, being assigned to the reserves in Segunda División B.

On 11 August 2017, Corozo joined Elche CF, still in the third level.

Cádiz CF B announced on 21 August 2019, that Corozo had joined the club on a one-year contract with an option for one further year. However, the club announced on 18 January 2020, that his contract had been terminated. Corozo didn't play any games for the club and was only called up to two league games, sitting on the bench on both occasions.

== International career ==
Corozo has been called up by Ecuador national team coach Reinaldo Rueda on a few occasions including Friendlies and CONMEBOL World Cup Qualifiers. He has yet to make his debut for the senior team.
