= Marlon de Jesús =

Ecuadorian footballer (born 1991)

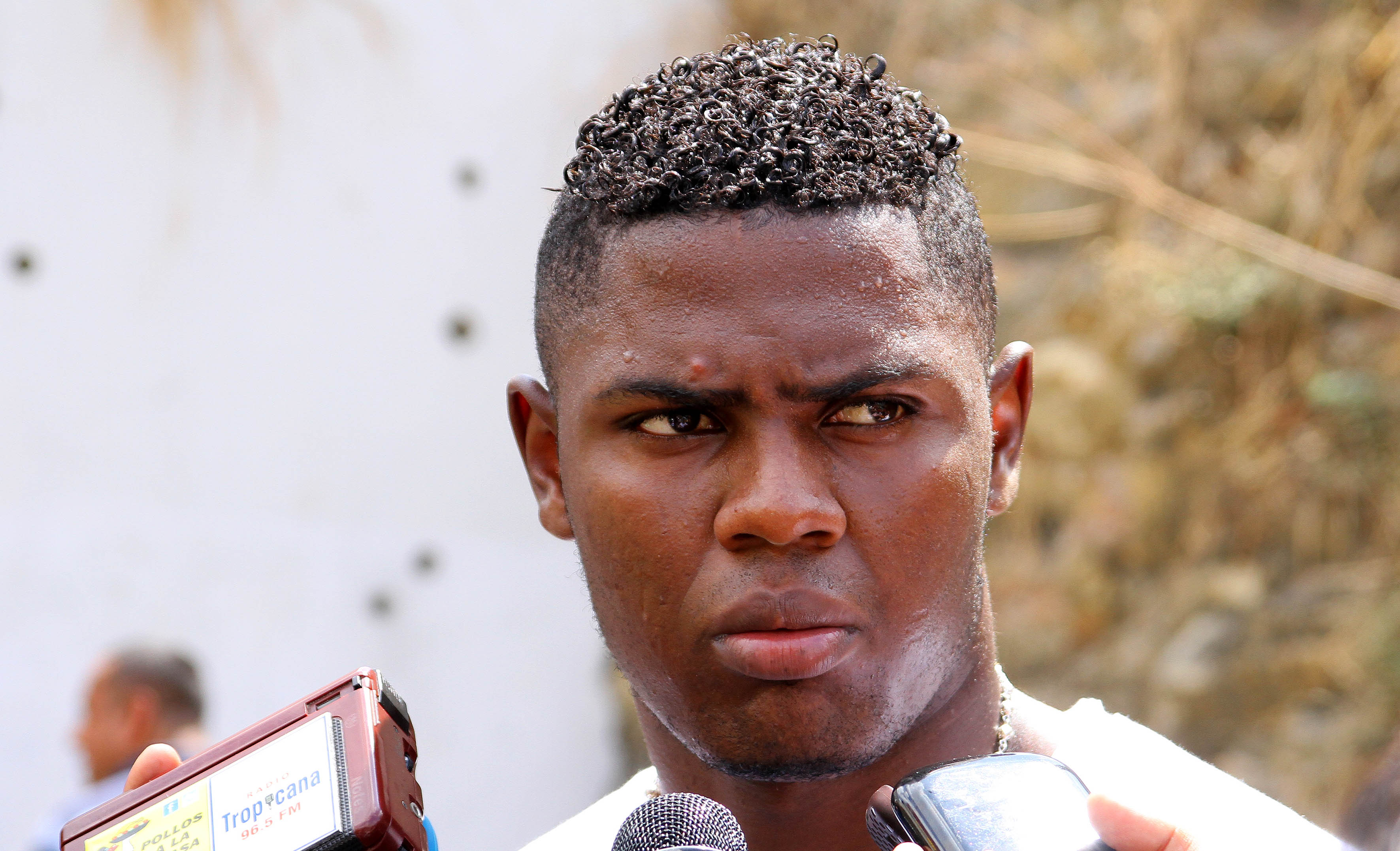
- de Jesús in 2015

Personal information
- Full name: Marlon Jonathan de Jesús Pavón
- Date of birth: September 4, 1991 (age 35)
- Place of birth: Ibarra, Imbabura, Ecuador
- Height: 1.88 m (6 ft 2 in)
- Position: Striker

Team information
- Current team: Sport Huancayo
- Number: 9

Youth career
- 2005–2006: El Nacional

Senior career*
| Years | Team | Apps | (Gls) |
| 2007–2010 | El Nacional | 47 | (14) |
| 2009 | → River Plate (loan) | | |
| 2009 | → Grêmio (loan) | | |
| 2011 | Deportivo Quito | 14 | (1) |
| 2011–2012 | → Maccabi Haifa (loan) | 6 | (0) |
| 2012–2013 | Emelec | 66 | (24) |
| 2013–2018 | Monterrey | 16 | (2) |
| 2014 | → Puebla (loan) | 2 | (0) |
| 2015 | → Barcelona (loan) | 2 | (2) |
| 2015 | → Cúcuta Deportivo (loan) | 8 | (0) |
| 2016 | → El Nacional (loan) | 12 | (1) |
| 2016–2017 | → Arouca (loan) | 4 | (0) |
| 2017–2018 | → Emelec (loan) | 10 | (5) |
| 2019 | Bucheon FC | 29 | (10) |
| 2020 | El Nacional | 27 | (5) |
| 2021–2022 | Binacional | 23 | (10) |
| 2022 | Al-Jabalain | 16 | (11) |
| 2022 | Nongbua Pitchaya | 10 | (3) |
| 2023–2024 | Unión Comercio | 44 | (17) |
| 2025– | Sport Huancayo | 32 | (6) |

International career
| 2008–2011 | Ecuador U20 | 15 | (2) |
| 2010–2013 | Ecuador | 5 | (0) |
- * Club domestic league appearances and goals as of 29 December 2025

Marlon Jonathan de Jesús Pavón (born 4 September 1991) is an Ecuadorian football striker currently playing for club Sport Huancayo.

== Club career ==
=== El Nacional ===
==== 2009–2010 ====
De Jesús came out of the youth divisions of Nacional. Interest rose from Argentine club River Plate in December 2008. On February 19, 2009, Marlon de Jesús signed a contract with River Plate. He spent two months with Grêmio, before returning to El Nacional on June 15, 2009. His first goals for El Nacional was on April 18, scoring 4 goals in an emphatic 5–0 home win over Emelec. Later he would go on to score goals against ESPOLI, Manta, Independiente, Olmedo, Barcelona and Macara, taking Marlon's goal tally up to 12 in his second season with El Nacional. He was then transferred to Deportivo Quito.

=== Deportivo Quito ===
==== 2011 ====
Marlon made his club debut with Deportivo Quito on March 5, in a 6–1 away win against Independiente. His only goal for Deportivo was scored on March 9, in a 3–1 home win over Olmedo. He finished the first half of the season playing only 14 and scoring 1 goal.

==== Loan to Maccabi Haifa ====
Marlon was subsequently loaned to Maccabi Haifa to get some more footballing experience. He only played 6 unimpressive games, scoring no goals for Maccabi Haifa.

=== Emelec ===
==== 2012 ====
De Jesus was once again loaned, this time to Ecuadorian giants Emelec. He made his new club debut on February 5, in a 2–0 away win to Olmedo, where he also scored his first goal with the club. A week later on February 12, he scored his second with Emelec, in a 3–2 home win over Macara. Marlon went on to score 6 more goals for the rest of the first half of the Ecuadorian Serie A season against clubs El Nacional, Independiente, LDU Quito, Tecnico Universitario and 2 goals against LDU Loja. On August 1, 2012, Emelec acquired his playing rights on a permanent basis as he has been performing very well during the first six months of the 2012 season. Marlon played more matches in the second half of the 2012 season with Emelec, but scored less goals than the first half, taking his total goal tally to 13 league goals for Emelec, after having scored against clubs Olmedo, Manta, Tecnico, and 2 vital goals against LDU Quito in a 2-legged match up for the league's second place spot, and a 2013 Copa Libertadores Second stage qualification.

==== 2013 ====
First match of the season was on January 27, in a 3–0 home win over Macara. Marlon and Emelec would continue their great winning form, scoring his first goals on January 30 in a 4–0 away win against Universidad Catolica, on March 13 against Manta in a 1–0 home win, and against Deportivo Quito, on April 19, where he scored the only goal in the Capwell home stadium. Marlon scored his first Copa Libertadores goal on March 5, in a 2–1 home win against Deportivo Iquique. Marlon played all 6 2013 Copa Libertadores group matches, where Emelec qualified second, and faces up Brazilian giants and 2012 Bralian League champs Fluminense. Marlon finished the first half of the season scoring 7 goals.

He began the second half of the season scoring a double against Deportivo Quevedo on July 7. A week later on July 13 Marlon scored against Manta, winning 4–1. On July 21, he scored the lone goal in a 1–0 home win against Independiente.

=== Club de Fútbol Monterrey ===
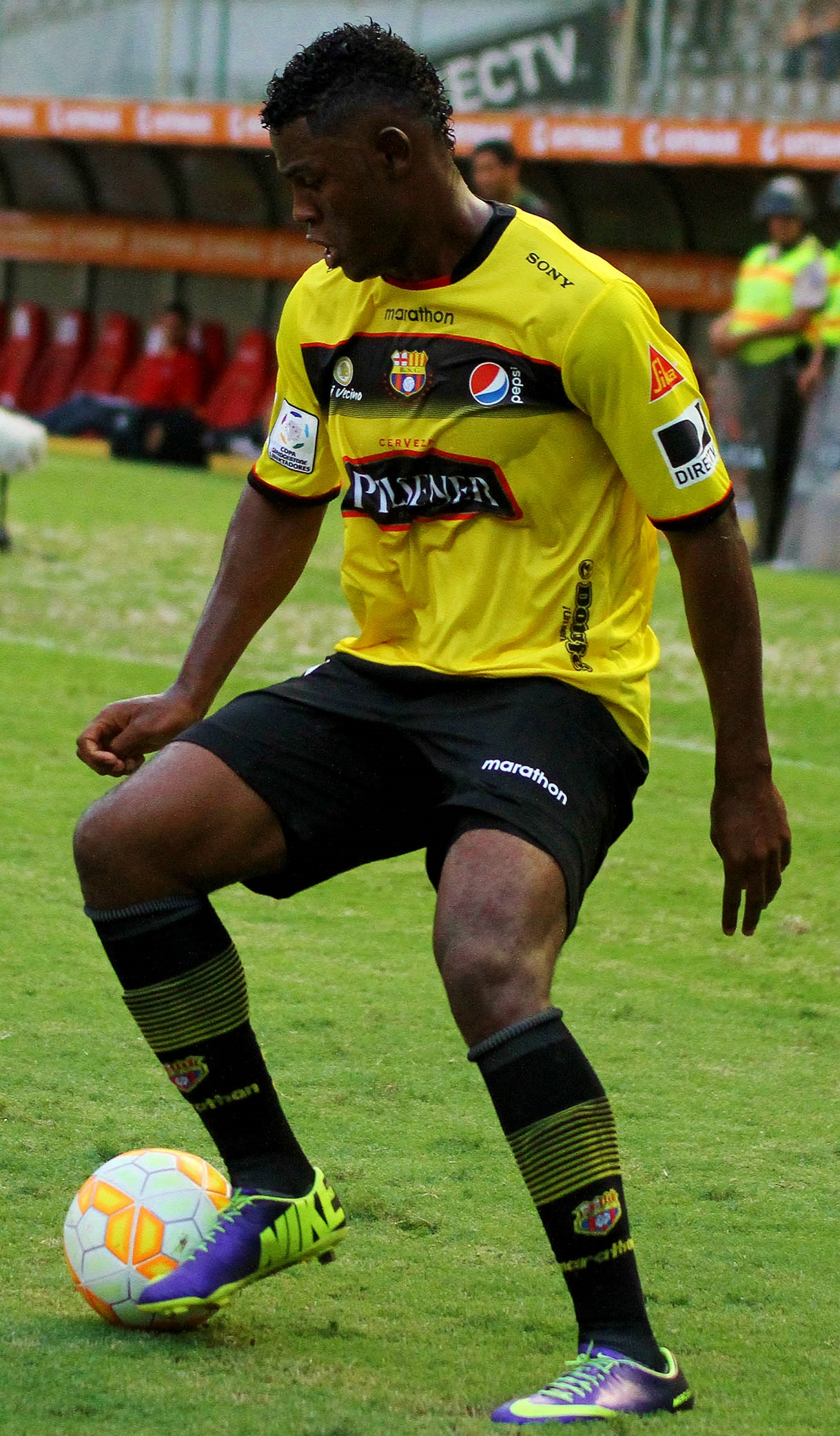
de Jesús playing out on loan with Barcelona in 2015

==== 2013 ====
On September 1, he signed a contract with the Mexican team C.F. Monterrey.

==== Loan to Arouca ====
On 8 July 2016, Marlon signed a one-year loan deal with the Portuguese team F.C. Arouca.

=== Al-Jabalain ===
On 24 January 2022, Marlon joined Saudi Arabian club Al-Jabalain.

=== Nongbua Pitchaya ===
On 18 July 2022, Marlon joined Thai club Nongbua Pitchaya on a one-year deal.

== International career ==
De Jesús was called up to participate in the 2009 South American Youth Championship in Venezuela.

== Honours ==
Emelec

- Ecuadorian Serie A: 2013, 2017
