= Carlos Arboleda =

Ecuadorian footballer (born 1991)

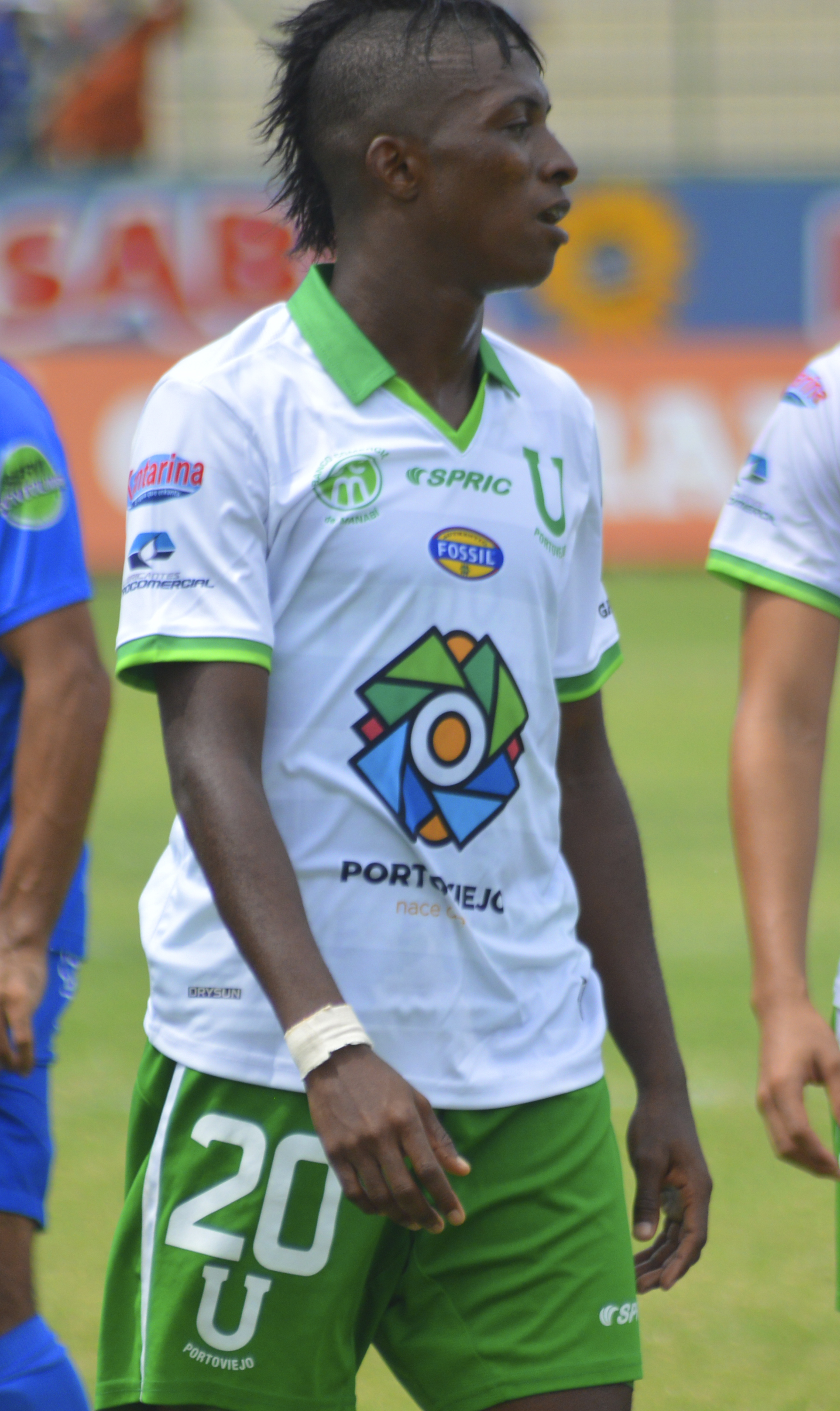
- Arboleda with LDUP in 2015

Personal information
- Full name: Carlos Alexi Arboleda Ruíz
- Date of birth: January 24, 1991 (age 35)
- Place of birth: Guayaquil, Ecuador
- Height: 1.73 m (5 ft 8 in)
- Position: Full back

Team information
- Current team: Libertad FC
- Number: 37

Youth career
- 2008: Sur y Norte
- 2010–2011: Caribe Junior

Senior career*
Years	Team	Apps	(Gls)
2012	Deportivo Quevedo	29	(1)
2013–2014	LDU Quito	25	(0)
2015	LDU Portoviejo	24	(0)
2016	LDU Loja	34	(7)
2017–2019	Macará	110	(11)
2020-2021	Aucas	7	(0)
2020	→ Orense (loan)	13	(0)
2021	9 de Octubre	8	(0)
2022–	Técnico Universitario	79	(7)
- * Club domestic league appearances and goals as of 1 December 2024

Carlos Alexi Arboleda Ruíz (born January 24, 1991) is an Ecuadorian footballer who plays for Libertad FC as a defender.
