= José Madrid =

Ecuadorian footballer (born 1988)

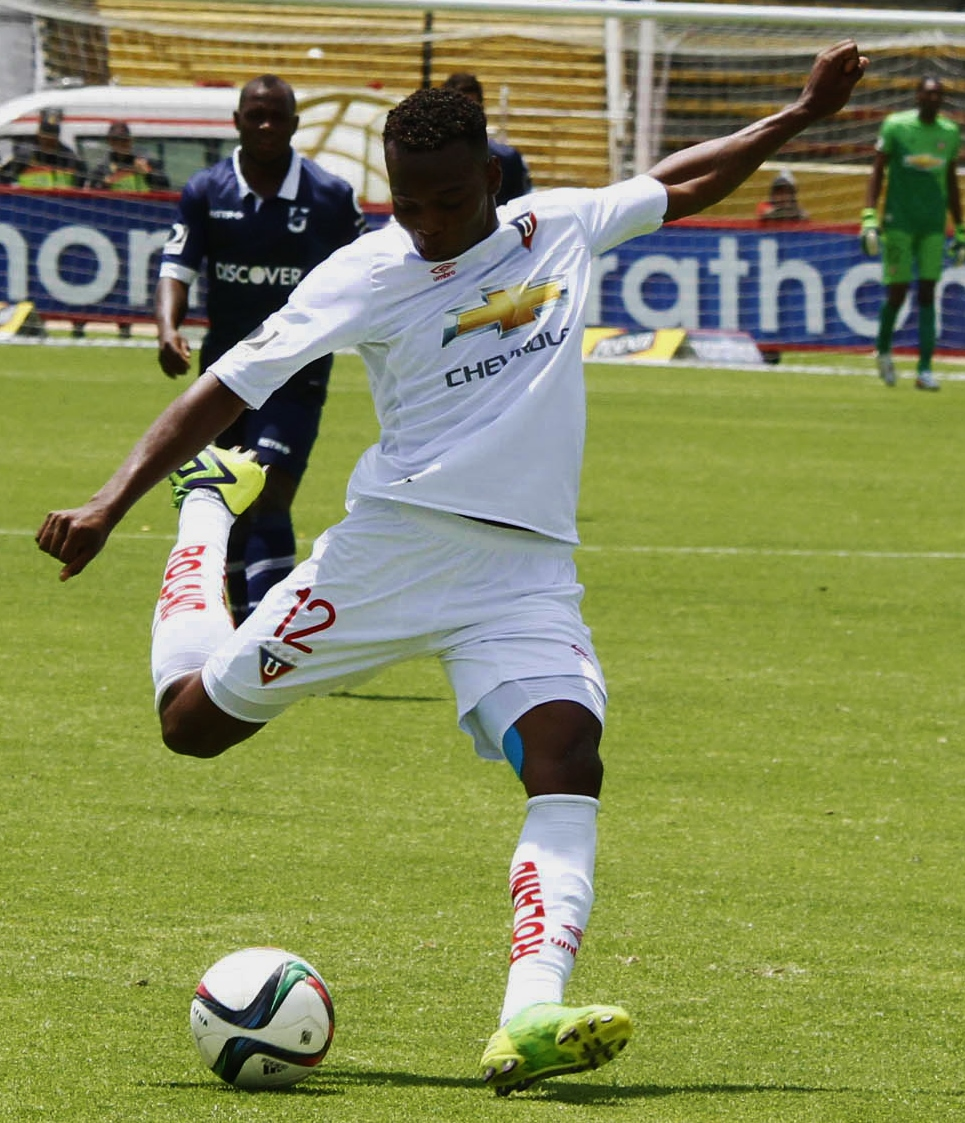

Personal information
- Full name: José Enrique Madrid
- Date of birth: 21 April 1988 (age 38)
- Place of birth: Guayaquil, Ecuador
- Height: 1.79 m (5 ft 10 in)
- Position: Full back

Team information
- Current team: Guayaquil City

Senior career*
Years	Team	Apps	(Gls)
2006–2012	El Nacional	125	(11)
2007	→ Técnico Universitario (loan)	2	(0)
2008	→ Dorados de Sinaloa (loan)	2	(0)
2013–2016	LDU Quito	111	(3)
2017	Delfín	1	(0)
2018–	Guayaquil City	0	(0)

International career
2011	Ecuador	1	(0)
- * Club domestic league appearances and goals as of January 29, 2017

José Enrique Madrid (born April 21, 1988) is an Ecuadorian footballer currently playing for Guayaquil City.

== Club career ==
He played for El Nacional in his youth, where he scored 2 goals in 8 games for them. He was a good talent and a key player in Jorge Célico's strategic plan for the team.

=== Transfer ===
In October 2008, he and Jefferson Montero transferred to the Mexican club Dorados de Sinaloa with the help of a former Ecuadorian teammate, Christian Benítez. He debuted for Dorados on October 11, coming on as a substitute against Irapuato. In January 2013, Madrid was transferred to LDU Quito.
