= Óscar Ayala =

Paraguayan footballer (born 1985)

Personal information
- Full name: Óscar Darío Ayala Ojeda
- Date of birth: 3 April 1985 (age 41)
- Place of birth: Mariano Roque Alonso, Paraguay
- Height: 1.80 m (5 ft 11 in)
- Position: Centre back

Senior career*
Years	Team	Apps	(Gls)
2007	General Díaz	0	(0)
2008–2013	Rubio Ñu	113	(0)
2011–2012	→ Boca Unidos (loan)	12	(0)
2013–2014	LDU Loja	40	(3)
2015	Sportivo Luqueño	14	(3)
2015	Atlético San Luis	0	(0)
2016	General Díaz	36	(0)
2017	Macará	37	(2)
2018	Deportivo Capiatá	3	(0)

International career
2011	Paraguay	1	(0)
- * Club domestic league appearances and goals as of 21:59, 10 October 2019 (UTC)

Óscar Darío Ayala Ojeda (born 3 April 1985) is a Paraguayan international footballer who plays as a centre back.

== Career ==
Ayala has played for General Díaz, Rubio Ñu and Boca Unidos.

He made his international debut for Paraguay in 2011.
