= Carlos Feraud =

Ecuadorian footballer (born 1990)

Personal information
- Full name: Carlos Alfredo Feraud Silva
- Date of birth: 23 October 1990 (age 36)
- Place of birth: Loja, Ecuador
- Height: 1.71 m (5 ft 7 in)
- Position: Midfielder

Team information
- Current team: Mushuc Runa

Youth career
- 2005–2007: LDU Loja

Senior career*
Years	Team	Apps	(Gls)
2008–2012	LDU Loja	168	(27)
2013–2016	LDU Quito	25	(1)
2014	→ Deportivo Quito (loan)	25	(3)
2015	→ Deportivo Cuenca (loan)	28	(1)
2016–2018	Macará	69	(20)
2018–2019	Al-Hazem	12	(0)
2019–2020	Macará	10	(1)
2021-2022	Mushuc Runa	10	(1)
2023–	Libertad	0	(0)
- * Club domestic league appearances and goals as of 18:55, 20 May 2019 (UTC)

Carlos Alfredo Feraud Silva (born October 23, 1990, in Loja) is an Ecuadorian footballer who plays for Libertad F.C. as a midfielder.

== Club career ==
=== Liga de Loja ===
==== 2008-2012 ====
Feraud came out of the youth system of LDU Loja. 2012 was his best season in Loja, where he helped LDU Loja achieve 2 successive Copa Sudamericana participations for the club, their first time ever in 2012. He scored 7 goals in 51 games for LDU Loja in the 2012 season. He played five years in the club, scoring 27 goals.

=== Liga de Quito ===
==== 2013 Season ====
In late 2012, he signed a five-year contract with LDU Quito starting in the 2013 season. His official debut for LDU came in a 1-0 2013 Copa Libertadores home win against power-house Brazilian club Gremio in which Feraud scored the winning goal in the 74th minute.

== Career statistics ==
Ecuador			League		Cup		Continental		Other		Total	
Club	League	Season	Apps	Goals	Apps	Goals	Apps	Goals	Apps	Goals	Apps	Goals
LDU Loja	Serie B	2008	8	0	—		—		—		8	0
LDU Loja	Serie B	2009	35	4	—		—		—		35	4
LDU Loja	Serie B	2010	39	8	—		—		—		39	8
LDU Loja	Serie A	2011	41	9	—		—		—		41	9
LDU Loja	Serie A	2012	45	6	—		6	1	—		51	7
Total			168	27	—		6	1	—		174	28
LDU Quito	Serie A	2013	25	1	—		2	1	—		27	2
Total			25	1	—		2	1	—		27	2
Deportivo Quito	Serie A	2014	25	3	—		2	0	—		27	3
Total			25	3	—		2	0	—		27	3
Deportivo Cuenca	Serie A	2015	28	1	—		—		—		28	1
Total			28	1	—		—		—		28	1
Macará	Serie B	2016	41	14	—		—		—		41	14
Macará	Serie A	2017	28	6	—		—		—		28	6
Total			69	20	—		—		—		69	20
Career Total			315	52	—		10	2	—		325	54
