= Leandro Leguizamón =

Argentine footballer

Personal information
- Full name: Leandro Luján Leguizamón
- Date of birth: December 4, 1988
- Place of birth: Buenos Aires, Argentina
- Height: 1.81 m (5 ft 11 in)
- Position: Centre-forward

Team information
- Current team: Pastoreo FC
- Number: 29

Senior career*
Years	Team	Apps	(Gls)
2009-2011	Tristán Suárez		(13)
2011-2013	Tigre	25	(2)
2013-2014	Sporting Cristal	7	(0)
2014-2015	Tigre	5	(0)
2015-2016	Murciélagos	31	(8)
2016	Talleres Remedios	10	(0)
2017-2018	Murciélagos	18	(0)
2018-2020	General Lamadrid		
2020-2021	San Miguel	37	(10)
2021-2022	Pastoreo FC		
- * Club domestic league appearances and goals

Leandro Leguizamón (born December 4, 1988, in Buenos Aires) is an Argentine professional footballer.
