= Koob Hurtado =

Ecuadorian footballer (born 1985)

Personal information
- Full name: Koob David Hurtado Arboleda
- Date of birth: July 19, 1985 (age 41)
- Place of birth: Eloy Alfaro, Ecuador
- Height: 1.83 m (6 ft 0 in)
- Position: Centre back

Team information
- Current team: LDU Portoviejo

Youth career
- 2002: Audaz Octubrino
- 2003–2004: Deportivo Cuenca
- 2004: → Santos (loan)
- 2005: Deportivo Cuenca
- 2005: → Audaz Octubrino (loan)

Senior career*
Years	Team	Apps	(Gls)
2006–2009	Deportivo Cuenca	18	(0)
2007	→ Audaz Octubrino (loan)	14	(5)
2009	→ Técnico Universitario (loan)	18	(0)
2010	Municipal Cañar	11	(0)
2010–2011	Independiente José Terán	21	(0)
2012	LDU Loja	23	(1)
2013–2014	LDU Quito	23	(1)
2015	Deportivo Cuenca	28	(0)
2016	→ Fuerza Amarilla (loan)	12	(0)
2016	→ Cobreloa (loan)	8	(1)
2017–2018	Guayaquil City	22	(0)
2018	Aucas	9	(0)
2019	Mushuc Runa	4	(0)
2019–	LDU Portoviejo	0	(0)
- * Club domestic league appearances and goals as of 22:39, 11 July 2019 (UTC)

Koob David Hurtado Arboleda (born July 19, 1985) is an Ecuadorian footballer who plays as a centre back for LDU Portoviejo.

== Career ==
In June 2019, Hurtado joined .
