= Luis Santana (footballer) =

Ecuadorian footballer (born 1991)

Personal information
- Full name: Luis Bernardo Santana Vera
- Date of birth: July 9, 1991 (age 35)
- Place of birth: Guayaquil, Ecuador
- Height: 1.68 m (5 ft 6 in)
- Position: Forward

Team information
- Current team: C.D. El Nacional

Youth career
- 2005: Rocafuerte

Senior career*
Years	Team	Apps	(Gls)
2006–2010	Rocafuerte	78	(24)
2011–2014	River Plate Ecuador	36	(11)
2012	→ Técnico Universitario (loan)	34	(6)
2013	→ LDU Quito (loan)	10	(2)
2014	→ Deportivo Cuenca (loan)	33	(3)
2015–	Deportivo Cuenca	24	(1)
2016	→ Mushuc Runa (loan)	15	(1)
2017–	→ L.D.U. Portoviejo (loan)	20	(1)
- * Club domestic league appearances and goals as of August 12, 2017

Luis Bernardo Santana Vera (born July 9, 1991) is an Ecuadorian footballer who plays as a forward for C.D. El Nacional.
