= Marco Mosquera =

Ecuadorian footballer (born 1984)

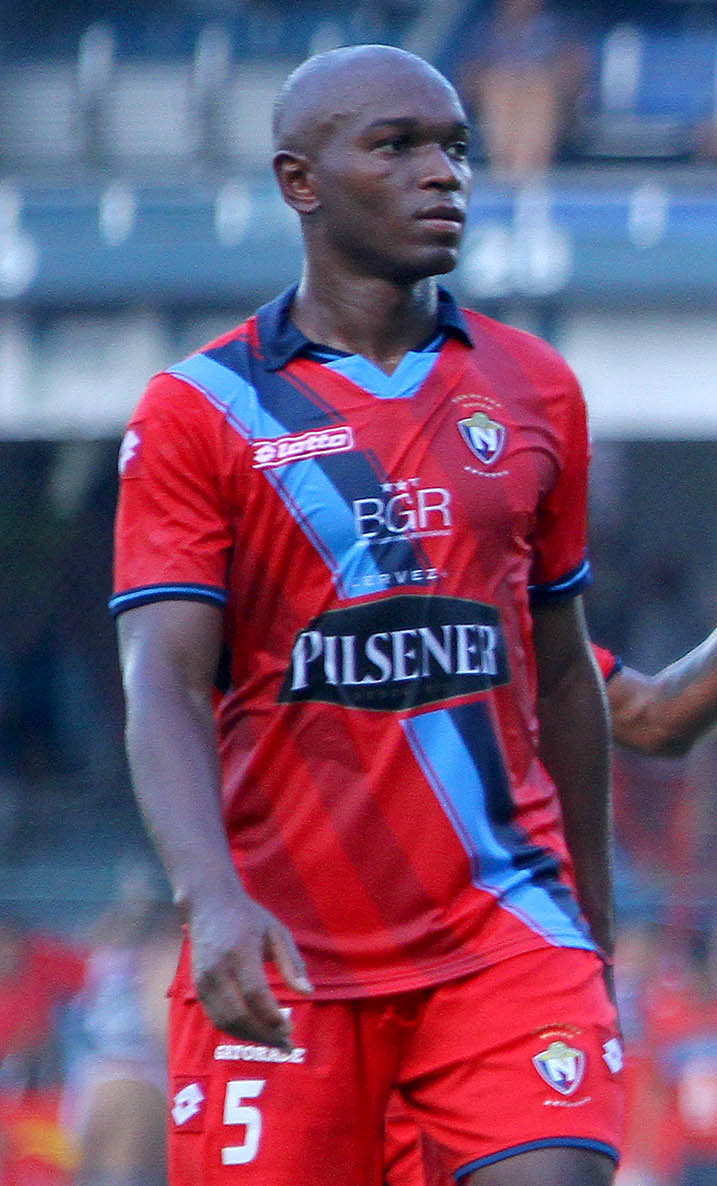
- Mosquera playing for El Nacional in 2015

Personal information
- Full name: Marco Roberto Mosquera Borja
- Date of birth: December 3, 1984 (age 41)
- Place of birth: Esmeraldas, Ecuador
- Height: 1.72 m (5 ft 8 in)
- Position: Midfielder

Youth career
- 2000: LDU Quito
- 2001–2003: Universidad Católica

Senior career*
Years	Team	Apps	(Gls)
2003–2011	Universidad Católica	204	(8)
2010	→ Barcelona SC (loan)	2	(0)
2012	LDU Loja	39	(2)
2013	LDU Quito	10	(0)
2013–2014	Olmedo	56	(1)
2015	El Nacional	31	(1)
2016–2018	Deportivo Cuenca	126	(2)
2019–2020	Aucas	17	(1)
2020–2022	Mushuc Runa	2	(0)
2022–	9 de Octubre F.C.	0	(0)
- * Club domestic league appearances and goals as of 08:59, 6 July 2020 (UTC)

Marco Roberto Mosquera Borja (born December 3, 1984) is an Ecuadorian footballer who plays as a midfielder for 9 de Octubre.

== Honors ==
Universidad Católica

- Serie B: 2007
