= Estadio 7 de Octubre =

Multi-purpose stadium in Quevedo, Ecuador

- Interactive map of Estadio 7 de Octubre
- Full name: Estadio 7 de Octubre
- Location: Quevedo, Ecuador
- Coordinates: 1°2′8.26″S 79°28′4.30″W
- Capacity: 15,200
- Surface: Grass

Construction
- Opened: June 15, 1952
- Renovated: 1977, 1983, 1995

Tenant
- Club Deportivo Quevedo

Estadio 7 de Octubre is a multi-purpose stadium in Quevedo, Ecuador. It is currently used mostly for football matches and hosts the homes matches of Club Deportivo Quevedo of the Ecuadorian Serie A . The stadium has a capacity 15,200 spectators.
