= Carlos Garcés =

Carlos Garcés may refer to:

- Carlos Emiro Garcés (born 2001), Colombian football defender
- Carlos Garcés (Ecuadorian footballer) (born 1990), Ecuadorian football forward
- Carlos Garcés Fernández (1927–2017), Chilean agronomist and politician
- Carlos Garcés López (1900–1980), Mexican athlete, football player and administrator, and dentist
