= Luis Saritama =

Ecuadorian footballer (born 1983)

Luis Fernando Saritama
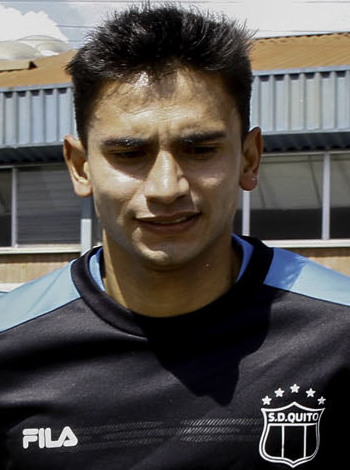

Personal information
- Full name: Luis Fernando Saritama Padilla
- Date of birth: October 20, 1983 (age 43)
- Place of birth: Loja, Ecuador
- Height: 1.72 m (5 ft 8 in)
- Position: Midfielder

Youth career
- –2001: Deportivo Quito

Senior career*
Years	Team	Apps	(Gls)
2001–2004	Deportivo Quito	103	(13)
2004–2005	Alianza Lima	14	(0)
2005–2006	Deportivo Quito	53	(12)
2006	UANL Tigres	14	(1)
2007–2008	Club América	7	(0)
2007–2008	→ Alianza Lima (loan)	20	(5)
2008–2012	Deportivo Quito	174	(28)
2013–2015	LDU Quito	37	(1)
2014	→ Barcelona (loan)	12	(0)
2015	Deportivo Quito	31	(3)
2016–2018	Deportivo Cuenca	66	(0)
2018–2019	Deportivo Quito	0	(0)
2019–2020	Independiente Juniors	0	(0)
2020	Deportivo Quito	0	(0)
2020	Libertad	0	(0)
2021-2022	Deportivo Quito	0	(0)
Total		531	(63)

International career
2003–2014	Ecuador	48	(0)
- * Club domestic league appearances and goals

Luis Fernando Saritama Padilla (born October 20, 1983) is an Ecuadorian former footballer who played as a midfielder.

== International career ==
Saritama is an attacking midfielder and has been selected in the Ecuador national team for the 2006 FIFA World Cup in Germany. He has played in every Ecuador youth national team and has captained various of those teams, where he displayed fine passing and playmaking ability. Luis Fernando made his international debut against Peru in 2003. In 2006, he played against Brazil in Sweden, Mexico in Oakland, and U.S. in Tampa Bay.

== Club career ==
=== Alianza Lima ===
In 2004, he had a brief stint in the Peruvian first division with Alianza Lima, along with compatriot Jhonny Baldeón. Together, they both played key roles in Alianza's championship run all the way to the finals and became the Clausura champions. In 2007, he made his return to the team and he stayed there until the end of the year.

=== Deportivo Quito ===
But as soon as he helped Alianza lift the trophy, he returned to Deportivo Quito, along with Baldeon. Despite being just 22, he was the captain of Deportivo Quito, his only ever club team in his native Ecuador. It was during this period that he was used more regularly for his national side, and it became clear that Ecuador coach Luis Fernando Suarez intended on bringing him to Germany 06. In December 2008, he helped Quito win their third title in history.

=== UANL Tigres and Club América ===
Saritama was signed on July 25, 2006, right after the FIFA World Cup by Tigres UANL, the same club where Ivan Hurtado, Ecuador's evergreen captain, played while in the Mexican league. There he was one of the most popular players in that club, he suffered a horrible season as Tigres were last in their group and constantly conceding large numbers of goals. He scored a few goals during that period, but it became clear that the Tigres coach Mario Carrillo, who succeeded Luis Fernando Tena after several terrible performances, did not intend to fit him into the team plans.

He was then transferred to Mexican ancient Club América during the winter transfer window, mainly to reinforce the team for its Copa Libertadores 2007 action. His contract, which was to tie him to the Estadio Azteca for four years, specified that he was only to participate in Copa Libertadores games, but the Mexican club later allowed him to play in official Primera División de México matches. He scored a goal in January 2007 during his debut with América against Peruvian club Sporting Cristal in the first round of Copa Libertadores. However, after six months spent with the old club, it was clear he was not producing any positive results, and they loaned him to Peruvian traditional powers Alianza Lima. His season with Alianza was impressive enough, and he was loaned out again by América, this time back to the club of his beginnings, Deportivo Quito.

=== LDU Quito ===
==== 2013 ====
Saritama was presented as a new player for LDU Quito on January 3, 2013, with a three-year contract. His official debut with LDU Quito came on January 23, in a 1-0 2013 Copa Libertadores home win play-off match against Gremio. After 11 league matches played, on April 14, Saritama scored his first goal with LDU Quito in a 3–0 away win against Macara.

=== Barcelona ===
==== 2014 ====
On February 11, 2014, it was confirmed that Saritama would join Ecuadorian giants Barcelona on loan for 1 year.

=== Return to Deportivo Quito ===
After unsuccessful runs with LDU Quito and Barcelona, It was confirmed on March 2, 2015, that Saritama would return to his first club Deportivo Quito.

=== Independiente Juniors ===
On 17 January 2019, Saritama joined Independiente Juniors.

== Honours ==
=== Club ===
- Deportivo Quito
  - Serie A (3): 2008, 2009, 2011
