= Rogerio Leichtweis =

Paraguayan footballer (born 1988)

Personal information
- Full name: Rogerio Luis Leichtweis
- Date of birth: 28 June 1988 (age 38)
- Place of birth: Santa Rita, Paraguay
- Height: 1.80 m (5 ft 11 in)
- Position: Forward

Team information
- Current team: FC Cascavel

Youth career
- –2009: Olimpia

Senior career*
Years	Team	Apps	(Gls)
2009	Olimpia	0	(0)
2010–2016	Libertad	25	(2)
2010	→ Tacuary (loan)	4	(0)
2011	→ San Lorenzo (loan)	0	(0)
2012	→ Cerro Porteño PF (loan)	36	(14)
2013	→ Deportes Tolima (loan)	17	(6)
2014	→ 3 de Febrero (loan)	14	(2)
2015	→ Deportes Tolima (loan)	19	(3)
2016	Sportivo Luqueño	9	(1)
2017	Guarani	0	(0)
2017–2019	General Díaz	47	(11)
2019	Guabirá	10	(0)
2021	FC Cascavel	0	(0)
- * Club domestic league appearances and goals

Rogerio Leichtweis (born June 28, 1988) is a Paraguayan football forward who currently plays for Club Deportivo Guabirá.

== Career ==
Rogerio Leichtweis began his career in Club Olimpia. Then he was transferred to Club Libertad. From 2009 to 2010 he was in Tacuary on loan, where he had only four appearances.

For the 2011 season, Leichtweis was transferred to Sportivo San Lorenzo on loan. The next year was loaned to Club Cerro Porteño (Presidente Franco), where he finished goalscorer of the team with 14 goals in 36 matches, and was third in the Top Scorers table of the Torneo Apertura.

In December 2012, Leichtweis arrived in Colombia after signing a one-year loan deal with Deportes Tolima until the end of the year.

== National team ==
Leichtweis was called up on November 14, 2012 by coach Gerardo Pelusso for a friendly match against Guatemala. However, he remained on the bench throughout all the match, which ended 3-1 with Paraguayan victory over Guatemala.
