= Francisco Rojas (footballer, born 1991) =

Ecuadorian footballer

Personal information
- Full name: Francisco Elías Rojas Mendoza
- Date of birth: January 13, 1991 (age 35)
- Place of birth: La Troncal, Ecuador
- Height: 1.76 m (5 ft 9 in)
- Position: Midfielder

Team information
- Current team: Manta

Youth career
- 2007: Manuel J. Calle
- 2009: Independiente José Terán

Senior career*
Years	Team	Apps	(Gls)
2009	Independiente José Terán	6	(1)
2010	Aucas	12	(2)
2011	Deportivo Azogues	1	(0)
2012	Manta	29	(6)
2013–2017	LDU Quito	20	(2)
2014	→ Deportivo Quito (loan)	2	(0)
2014	→ Manta (loan)	7	(0)
2017	Macará B	4	(0)
2017	Deportivo La Paz	4	(3)
2018	Politécnico	4	(2)
2018	Club Malecón	8	(3)
2019–	Manta	6	(0)
- * Club domestic league appearances and goals as of 15:05, 13 June 2019 (UTC)

Francisco Elías Rojas Mendoza (born January 13, 1991, in La Troncal) is an Ecuadorian footballer who plays as a midfielder for Manta. His older brother is Joao Rojas.

== Honors ==
Independiente José Terán

- Serie B: 2009
