= Hugo Vélez =

Ecuadorian footballer (born 1986)

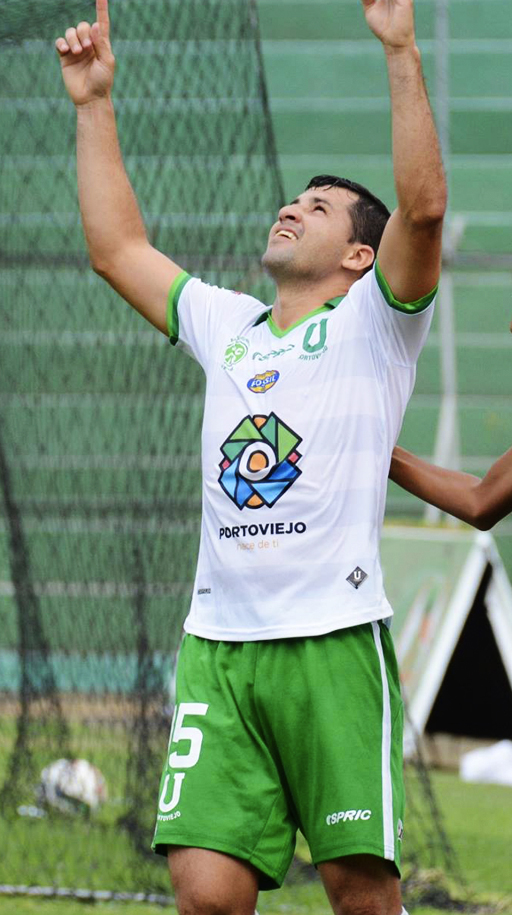
- Hugo Vélez in 2015.

Personal information
- Full name: Hugo Javier Vélez Benítez
- Date of birth: May 26, 1986 (age 40)
- Place of birth: Portoviejo, Ecuador
- Height: 1.70 m (5 ft 7 in)
- Position: Midfielder

Team information
- Current team: LDU Portoviejo

Youth career
- 2002–2004: LDU Portoviejo

Senior career*
Years	Team	Apps	(Gls)
2005–2009	LDU Portoviejo	185	(13)
2010	Universidad Católica	35	(3)
2011–2012	El Nacional	74	(6)
2013	L.D.U. Quito	12	(0)
2014	Universidad Católica	1	(0)
2014–2015	LDU Portoviejo	79	(14)
2016	Mushuc Runa	13	(0)
2017–	LDU Portoviejo	27	(2)
- * Club domestic league appearances and goals as of August 26, 2017

Hugo Javier Vélez Benítez (born May 26, 1986) is an Ecuadorian footballer who plays as a midfielder for LDU Portoviejo.
