= Ignacio Canuto =

Argentine football central defender

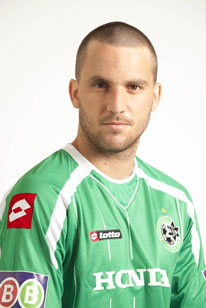

Personal information
- Full name: Ignacio Canuto
- Date of birth: February 20, 1986 (age 40)
- Place of birth: Santa Fe, Argentina
- Height: 1.82 m (6 ft 0 in)
- Position: Centre-back

Youth career
- Unión Santa Fe

Senior career*
Years	Team	Apps	(Gls)
2004–2007	Unión Santa Fe	60	(2)
2006	→ Ben Hur (loan)	6	(0)
2008–2010	Argentinos Juniors	50	(6)
2010–2011	Maccabi Haifa	17	(0)
2011–2012	Libertad	32	(6)
2012–2013	Figueirense	14	(0)
2013–2014	LDU Quito	43	(3)
2014–2015	Tigre	36	(1)
2015	León	11	(0)
2016–2017	Tucumán	23	(0)
2017–2018	Lanús	8	(0)
2018–2020	Tigre	44	(3)
2020–2021	Platense	0	(0)

International career
2009–2010	Argentina	3	(1)
- * Club domestic league appearances and goals as of 22:04, 13 May 2022 (UTC)

Ignacio Canuto (born 20 February 1986 in Santa Fe) is an Argentine footballer, who plays as a centre-back.

He has previously played for Unión (Argentina), Ben Hur (Argentina), Argentinos Juniors (Argentina), Maccabi Haifa (Israel), Libertad (Paraguay), LDU Quito (Ecuador), Tigre (Argentina) and León (Mexico).

== Career ==
=== Club ===
Canuto began his playing career in 2004 with Unión. After a loan spell with Ben Hur in 2007, he joined Argentinos Juniors of the Argentine Primera División in 2008. He was a regular player for the Argentinos Juniors team that won the Clausura 2010 championship. He played in 13 of the club's 19 games during their championship winning campaign. In July 2010, Canuto was sold to Maccabi Haifa of the Israeli Premier League. The club signed him to a five-year contract. After a spell in Israel, Canuto joined Paraguayan Primera División club Libertad. He played 32 times and scored 6 goals for the club before moving clubs once again as he joined Brazilian top-flight side Figueirense, 3 goals in 28 appearances in all competitions followed. Although he played for Figueirense, Brazilian Série C team Tombense own his federation rights.

2013 saw Canuto leave Brazil for Ecuador as he joined LDU Quito, he only stayed for one season but did play 43 league fixtures for the club while scoring three goals. He returned to Argentina in 2014 to sign for Tigre. His first two games for Tigre ended 0–0, and when he did win his first game with the team it was he who scored the winning goal; versus Racing Club de Avellaneda. He made 36 appearances over two campaigns for Tigre before leaving. His next club became Mexican Liga MX side León in January 2015. Four months and 11 games later, Canuto left León before eventually signing for Argentine Primera División club Atlético Tucumán in 2016.

=== International ===
On 20 May 2009 Canuto made his international debut in a friendly match against Panama. He came on as a second-half substitute for the Argentina team, made up of players based in the Primera División Argentina. Canuto scored his first international goal on his third appearance for Argentina on 10 February 2010 to secure a 2–1 win over Jamaica. He scored in the 93rd minute of the game, only 2 minutes after having come into the game as a late 2nd half substitute.

=== International goals ===
As of 10 February 2010. Scores and results list Argentina's goal tally first.

No.	Date	Venue	Opponent	Score	Result	Competition	Ref.
1	10 February 2010	Estadio José María Minella, Mar del Plata, Argentina	Jamaica	2–1	2–1	Friendly	

== Career statistics ==
=== Club ===
As of 18 October 2016.

Club statistics
Club	Season	League			Cup (Note: Includes the Copa Argentina)		League Cup		Continental (Note: Includes the Copa Libertadores and Copa Sudamericana)		Other		Total	
Club	Season	Division	Apps	Goals	Apps	Goals	Apps	Goals	Apps	Goals	Apps	Goals	Apps	Goals
Atlético Tucumán	2016	Primera División	1	0	0	0	—		—		0	0	1	0
Atlético Tucumán	2016–17	Primera División	2	0	0	0	—		—		0	0	2	0
Atlético Tucumán	Total		3	0	0	0	—		—		0	0	3	0
Career total			3	0	0	0	—		—		0	0	3	0

== Honours ==
Argentinos Juniors

- Argentine Primera División (1): Clausura 2010
