= Eduardo Morante =

Ecuadorian footballer (born 1987)

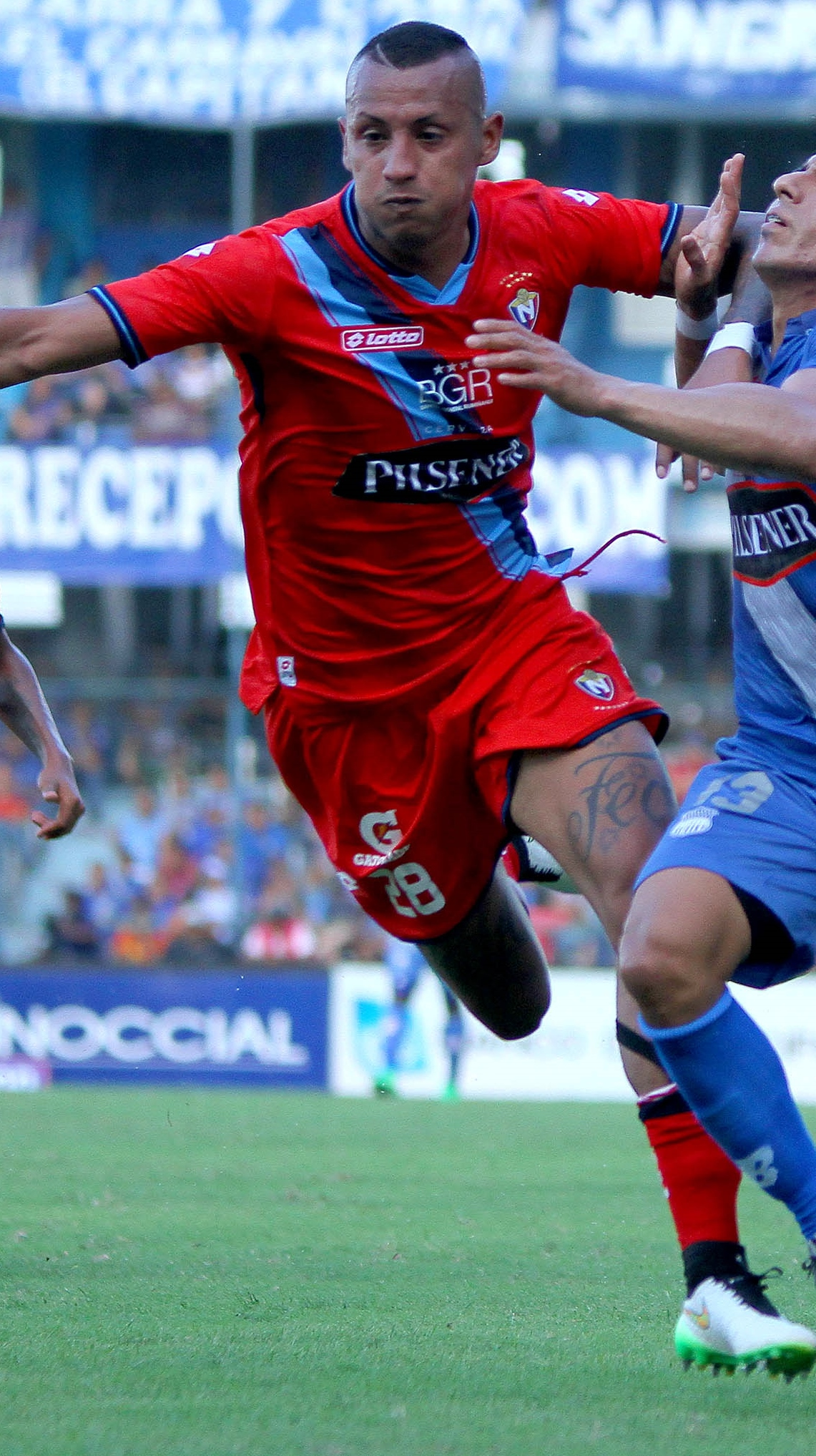

Personal information
- Full name: Eduardo Javier Morante Rosas
- Date of birth: June 1, 1987 (age 39)
- Place of birth: Vinces, Los Ríos, Ecuador
- Height: 1.88 m (6 ft 2 in)
- Position: Centre back

Youth career
- 2003–2005: Aucas

Senior career*
| Years | Team | Apps | (Gls) |
| 2006–2011 | Emelec | 60 | (1) |
| 2012–2014 | Universidad de Chile | 4 | (1) |
| 2013 | → LDU Quito (loan) | 12 | (1) |
| 2014 | → Deportivo Cuenca (loan) | 13 | (1) |
| 2015–2016 | El Nacional | 19 | (0) |
| 2016–2017 | Mushuc Runa | 2 | (0) |
| 2017 | Fuerza Amarilla | 1 | (0) |
| Total | | 111 | (4) |

International career
| 2010–2013 | Ecuador | 5 | (0) |
- * Club domestic league appearances and goals

Eduardo Javier Morante Rosas (Spanish pronunciation: [eˈðwaɾðo moˈrante], born 1 June 1987) is an Ecuadorian former footballer who played as a centre back.

== Club career ==
=== Emelec ===
Morante came from Aucas's youth system. In 2006, he was transferred to Emelec, where he has played since. During his first three years with the "Electrics", he did not have many opportunity to showcase his abilities, having played only one match in each season from 2006 to 2009. With the arrival of Argentinean manager Jorge Sampaoli in 2010 he had his first serious opportunities to demonstrate what he was capable of doing, and he did not disappoint, ever since Sampaoli gave him his first opportunity he never again left Emelec's first team sheet and has established himself as one of the leaders of the team's defense and is now considered to be one of the most promising young players in Ecuador.

=== Universidad de Chile ===
==== 2012 Season ====
On 17 January 2012, was reported that Emelec accepted a US$2 million bid of Chilean Primera División club Universidad de Chile for Morante. Due to a season-long injury, Morante has lost his starting line-up spot, thus forced Sampaoli to send him on loan to 2011 Copa Sudamericana finals rivals LDU Quito for the first half of the 2013 season.

=== LDU Quito ===
==== 2013 Season ====
Morante returned to Ecuador on loan to play for LDU Quito.

== International career ==
His performances with his club grabbed the attention of newly hired Ecuador National team manager, the Colombian Reynaldo Rueda who called Morante for two international friendly matches to be played in August 2010 against Mexico and Venezuela. However, Morante got injured the weekend before joining Ecuador's squad and could not attend the call up.

== Honours ==
=== Club ===
Universidad de Chile

- Primera División de Chile (1): 2012 Apertura
