= 2013 Copa Libertadores =

54th season of Copa Libertadores

2013 Copa Libertadores de América
2013 Copa Bridgestone Libertadores de América 2013 Copa Bridgestone Libertadores da América

Tournament details
- Dates: 22 January – 24 July 2013
- Teams: 38 (from 11 associations)

Final positions
- Champions: (Brazil) Atlético Mineiro (1st title)
- Runners-up: (Paraguay) Olimpia

Tournament statistics
- Matches played: 138
- Goals scored: 345 (2.5 per match)
- Attendance: 3,425,911 (24,825 per match)
- Top scorer: (Brazil) Jô (7 goals)

The 2013 Copa Libertadores de América (officially the 2013 Copa Bridgestone Libertadores for sponsorship reasons) was the 54th edition of the Copa Libertadores de América, South America's premier international club football tournament organized by CONMEBOL. Corinthians were the defending champions but were knocked out of the tournament by Boca Juniors in the round of 16.

For the fourth year in a row, the title was won by a Brazilian club, with Atlético Mineiro beating Paraguayan club Olimpia on penalties in the finals to win their first title. By winning the competition, Atlético Mineiro won the right to play in the 2013 FIFA Club World Cup and the 2014 Recopa Sudamericana.

== Qualified teams ==
The following teams qualified for the tournament.

Association	Team (Berth)	Entry stage	Qualification method
(Argentina) Argentina; 5 berths	Arsenal (Argentina 1)	Second stage	2012 Clausura champion
(Argentina) Argentina; 5 berths	Vélez Sarsfield (Argentina 2)	Second stage	2012 Torneo Inicial champion
(Argentina) Argentina; 5 berths	Newell's Old Boys (Argentina 3)	Second stage	2012 tournaments aggregate table best team not yet qualified
(Argentina) Argentina; 5 berths	Boca Juniors (Argentina 4)	Second stage	2012 tournaments aggregate table 2nd best team not yet qualified
(Argentina) Argentina; 5 berths	Tigre (Argentina 5)	First stage	2012 Copa Sudamericana best Argentine team not yet qualified
(Bolivia) Bolivia; 3 berths	The Strongest (Bolivia 1)	Second stage	2012 Clausura champion and 2012 Apertura champion
(Bolivia) Bolivia; 3 berths	San José (Bolivia 2)	Second stage	2012 Clausura runner-up and 2012 Apertura runner-up
(Bolivia) Bolivia; 3 berths	Bolívar (Bolivia 3)	First stage	Playoff winner between 2012 Clausura 3rd place and 2012 Apertura 3rd place
(Brazil) Brazil; 5 + 1 berths	Corinthians (Brazil 1; Title holders)	Second stage	2012 Copa Libertadores champion
(Brazil) Brazil; 5 + 1 berths	Fluminense (Brazil 2)	Second stage	2012 Campeonato Brasileiro Série A champion
(Brazil) Brazil; 5 + 1 berths	Palmeiras (Brazil 3)	Second stage	2012 Copa do Brasil champion
(Brazil) Brazil; 5 + 1 berths	Atlético Mineiro (Brazil 4)	Second stage	2012 Campeonato Brasileiro Série A runner-up
(Brazil) Brazil; 5 + 1 berths	Grêmio (Brazil 5)	First stage	2012 Campeonato Brasileiro Série A 3rd place
(Brazil) Brazil; 5 + 1 berths	São Paulo (Brazil 6)	First stage	2012 Campeonato Brasileiro Série A 4th place and 2012 Copa Sudamericana champion
(Chile) Chile; 3 berths	Universidad de Chile (Chile 1)	Second stage	2012 Apertura champion
(Chile) Chile; 3 berths	Huachipato (Chile 2)	Second stage	2012 Clausura champion
(Chile) Chile; 3 berths	Iquique (Chile 3)	First stage	2012 Primera División aggregate table best team not yet qualified
(Colombia) Colombia; 3 berths	Santa Fe (Colombia 1)	Second stage	2012 Apertura champion
(Colombia) Colombia; 3 berths	Millonarios (Colombia 2)	Second stage	2012 Finalización champion
(Colombia) Colombia; 3 berths	Deportes Tolima (Colombia 3)	First stage	2012 Primera A aggregate table best team not yet qualified
(Ecuador) Ecuador; 3 berths	Barcelona (Ecuador 1)	Second stage	2012 Serie A champion
(Ecuador) Ecuador; 3 berths	Emelec (Ecuador 2)	Second stage	2012 Serie A second-place playoffs winner
(Ecuador) Ecuador; 3 berths	LDU Quito (Ecuador 3)	First stage	2012 Serie A second-place playoffs loser
Mexico (CONCACAF); 3 invitees	Toluca (Mexico 1)	Second stage	2012 Apertura classification phase best team not qualified for 2012–13 CONCACAF Champions League
Mexico (CONCACAF); 3 invitees	Tijuana (Mexico 2)	Second stage	2012 Apertura classification phase 2nd best team not qualified for 2012–13 CONCACAF Champions League
Mexico (CONCACAF); 3 invitees	León (Mexico 3)	First stage	2012 Apertura classification phase 3rd best team not qualified for 2012–13 CONCACAF Champions League
(Paraguay) Paraguay; 3 berths	Libertad (Paraguay 1)	Second stage	2012 Primera División tournament champion with better record in aggregate table
(Paraguay) Paraguay; 3 berths	Cerro Porteño (Paraguay 2)	Second stage	2012 Primera División tournament champion with worse record in aggregate table
(Paraguay) Paraguay; 3 berths	Olimpia (Paraguay 3)	First stage	2012 Primera División aggregate table best team not yet qualified
(Peru) Peru; 3 berths	Sporting Cristal (Peru 1)	Second stage	2012 Descentralizado champion
(Peru) Peru; 3 berths	Real Garcilaso (Peru 2)	Second stage	2012 Descentralizado runner-up
(Peru) Peru; 3 berths	Universidad César Vallejo (Peru 3)	First stage	2012 Descentralizado aggregate table best team not yet qualified
(Uruguay) Uruguay; 3 berths	Nacional (Uruguay 1)	Second stage	2011–12 Primera División champion
(Uruguay) Uruguay; 3 berths	Peñarol (Uruguay 2)	Second stage	2011–12 Primera División runner-up
(Uruguay) Uruguay; 3 berths	Defensor Sporting (Uruguay 3)	First stage	2011–12 Primera División aggregate table best team not yet qualified
(Venezuela) Venezuela; 3 berths	Deportivo Lara (Venezuela 1)	Second stage	2011–12 Primera División champion
(Venezuela) Venezuela; 3 berths	Caracas (Venezuela 2)	Second stage	2011–12 Primera División runner-up
(Venezuela) Venezuela; 3 berths	Deportivo Anzoátegui (Venezuela 3)	First stage	2011–12 Primera División aggregate table best team not yet qualified

== Draw ==
Location of teams of the 2013 Copa Libertadores from South America.
Location of teams of the 2013 Copa Libertadores from Mexico.

The draw of the tournament was held on 21 December 2012 in Luque, Paraguay.

For the first stage, the 12 teams were drawn into six ties containing a team from Pot 1 and a team from Pot 2, with the former hosting the second leg in three ties, and the latter hosting the second leg in the other three ties. The seeding of each team was determined by which associations reached the furthest stage in the previous Copa Libertadores.

Pot 1	Pot 2
(Argentina) Tigre (Brazil) Grêmio (Brazil) São Paulo (Chile) Iquique (Colombia) Deportes Tolima (Paraguay) Olimpia	(Bolivia) Bolívar (Ecuador) LDU Quito (Mexico) León (Peru) Universidad César Vallejo (Uruguay) Defensor Sporting (Venezuela) Deportivo Anzoátegui

For the second stage, the 32 teams were drawn into eight groups of four containing one team from each of the four seeding pots. The seeding of each team was determined by their association and qualifying berth (as per the rotational agreement established by CONMEBOL, the teams which qualified through berths 1 from Colombia, Ecuador, Peru and Venezuela were seeded into Pot 1 for odd-numbered years, while the teams which qualified through berths 1 from Bolivia, Chile, Paraguay and Uruguay were seeded into Pot 1 for even-numbered years). Teams from the same association in Pots 1 and 3 could not be drawn into the same group. However, a first stage winner, whose identity was not known at the time of the draw, could be drawn into the same group with another team from the same association.

Pot 1	Pot 2	Pot 3	Pot 4
(Argentina) Arsenal (Argentina) Vélez Sarsfield (Brazil) Corinthians (Brazil) Fluminense (Colombia) Santa Fe (Ecuador) Barcelona (Peru) Sporting Cristal (Venezuela) Deportivo Lara	(Bolivia) The Strongest (Bolivia) San José; Universidad de Chile; Huachipato (Paraguay) Libertad (Paraguay) Cerro Porteño (Uruguay) Nacional (Uruguay) Peñarol	(Argentina) Newell's Old Boys (Argentina) Boca Juniors (Brazil) Palmeiras (Brazil) Atlético Mineiro (Colombia) Millonarios (Ecuador) Emelec (Peru) Real Garcilaso (Venezuela) Caracas	(Mexico) Toluca (Mexico) Tijuana; First stage winner G1; First stage winner G2; First stage winner G3; First stage winner G4; First stage winner G5; First stage winner G6

== Schedule ==
The schedule of the competition was as follows (all dates listed were Wednesdays, but matches may be played on Tuesdays and Thursdays as well).

Stage	First leg	Second leg
First stage	23 January	30 January
Second stage	13 February, 20, 27; 6, 13 March; 3, 10, 17 April	
Round of 16	24 April; 1 May	8, 15 May
Quarterfinals	22 May	29 May
Semifinals	3 July	10 July
Finals	17 July	24 July

== First stage ==
In the first stage, each tie was played on a home-and-away two-legged basis. If tied on aggregate, the away goals rule was used. If still tied, the penalty shoot-out was used to determine the winner (no extra time was played). The winners of each tie advanced to the second stage to join the 26 automatic qualifiers.

Team 1	Agg.	Team 2	1st leg	2nd leg
Tigre (Argentina)	5–1	(Venezuela) Deportivo Anzoátegui	2–1	3–0
LDU Quito (Ecuador)	1–1 (4–5 p)	(Brazil) Grêmio	1–0	0–1
Deportes Tolima (Colombia)	2–1	(Peru) Universidad César Vallejo	1–0	1–1
Defensor Sporting (Uruguay)	0–2	(Paraguay) Olimpia	0–0	0–2
São Paulo (Brazil)	8–4	(Bolivia) Bolívar	5–0	3–4
León (Mexico)	2–2 (2–4 p)	(Chile) Iquique	1–1	1–1

== Second stage ==
In the second stage, each group was played on a home-and-away round-robin basis. Each team earned 3 points for a win, 1 point for a draw, and 0 points for a loss. If tied on points, the following criteria were used to determine the ranking: 1. Goal difference; 2. Goals scored; 3. Away goals scored; 4. Drawing of lots. The winners and runners-up of each group advanced to the round of 16.

=== Group 1 ===
Pos	Team	Pld	W	D	L	GF	GA	GD	Pts	NAC	BOC	TOL	BAR
1	(Uruguay) Nacional (A)	6	3	1	2	10	6	+4	10		0–1	4–0	2–2
2	(Argentina) Boca Juniors (A)	6	3	0	3	7	7	0	9	0–1		1–2	1–0
3	(Mexico) Toluca	6	2	2	2	8	11	−3	8	2–3	3–2		1–1
4	(Ecuador) Barcelona	6	1	3	2	5	6	−1	6	1–0	1–2	0–0	

Source: RSSSF
Legend: Blue = home team win; Yellow = draw; Red = away team win.
(A) Advanced to the round of 16

=== Group 2 ===
Pos	Team	Pld	W	D	L	GF	GA	GD	Pts	PAL	TIG	LIB	CRI
1	(Brazil) Palmeiras (A)	6	3	0	3	5	5	0	9		2–0	1–0	2–1
2	(Argentina) Tigre (A)	6	3	0	3	9	10	−1	9	1–0		0–2	3–1
3	(Paraguay) Libertad	6	2	2	2	10	9	+1	8	2–0	3–5		2–2
4	(Peru) Sporting Cristal	6	2	2	2	8	8	0	8	1–0	2–0	1–1	

Source: RSSSF
Legend: Blue = home team win; Yellow = draw; Red = away team win.
(A) Advanced to the round of 16

=== Group 3 ===
Pos	Team	Pld	W	D	L	GF	GA	GD	Pts	CAM	SPL	ARS	STR
1	(Brazil) Atlético Mineiro (A)	6	5	0	1	16	9	+7	15		2–1	5–2	2–1
2	(Brazil) São Paulo (A)	6	2	1	3	8	8	0	7	2–0		1–1	2–1
3	(Argentina) Arsenal	6	2	1	3	10	15	−5	7	2–5	2–1		2–1
4	(Bolivia) The Strongest	6	2	0	4	8	10	−2	6	1–2	2–1	2–1	

Source: RSSSF
Legend: Blue = home team win; Yellow = draw; Red = away team win.
(A) Advanced to the round of 16

=== Group 4 ===
Pos	Team	Pld	W	D	L	GF	GA	GD	Pts	VEL	EME	PEN	IQU
1	(Argentina) Vélez Sarsfield (A)	6	4	1	1	10	3	+7	13		0–0	3–1	3–0
2	(Ecuador) Emelec (A)	6	3	1	2	5	4	+1	10	1–0		2–0	2–1
3	(Uruguay) Peñarol	6	3	0	3	7	7	0	9	0–1	1–0		3–0
4	(Chile) Iquique	6	1	0	5	5	13	−8	3	1–3	2–0	1–2	

Source: RSSSF
Legend: Blue = home team win; Yellow = draw; Red = away team win.
(A) Advanced to the round of 16

=== Group 5 ===
Pos	Team	Pld	W	D	L	GF	GA	GD	Pts	COR	TIJ	SJO	MIL
1	(Brazil) Corinthians (A)	6	4	1	1	10	2	+8	13		3–0	3–0	2–0
2	(Mexico) Tijuana (A)	6	4	1	1	8	4	+4	13	1–0		4–0	1–0
3	(Bolivia) San José	6	1	2	3	5	11	−6	5	1–1	1–1		2–0
4	(Colombia) Millonarios	6	1	0	5	2	8	−6	3	0–1	0–1	2–1	

Source: RSSSF
Legend: Blue = home team win; Yellow = draw; Red = away team win.
(A) Advanced to the round of 16

=== Group 6 ===
Pos	Team	Pld	W	D	L	GF	GA	GD	Pts	SFE	RGA	TOL	CEP
1	(Colombia) Santa Fe (A)	6	4	2	0	9	4	+5	14		2–0	1–1	1–0
2	(Peru) Real Garcilaso (A)	6	3	1	2	8	7	+1	10	1–1		0–3	5–1
3	(Colombia) Deportes Tolima	6	2	2	2	7	5	+2	8	1–2	0–1		2–1
4	(Paraguay) Cerro Porteño	6	0	1	5	3	11	−8	1	1–2	0–1	0–0	

Source: RSSSF
Legend: Blue = home team win; Yellow = draw; Red = away team win.
(A) Advanced to the round of 16

=== Group 7 ===
Pos	Team	Pld	W	D	L	GF	GA	GD	Pts	OLI	NEW	UCH	LAR
1	(Paraguay) Olimpia (A)	6	4	1	1	16	7	+9	13		4–1	3–0	2–2
2	(Argentina) Newell's Old Boys (A)	6	3	0	3	11	10	+1	9	3–1		1–2	3–1
3	Universidad de Chile	6	3	0	3	7	9	−2	9	0–1	0–2		2–0
4	(Venezuela) Deportivo Lara	6	1	1	4	8	16	−8	4	1–5	2–1	2–3	

Source: RSSSF
Legend: Blue = home team win; Yellow = draw; Red = away team win.
(A) Advanced to the round of 16

=== Group 8 ===
Pos	Team	Pld	W	D	L	GF	GA	GD	Pts	FLU	GRE	HUA	CAR
1	(Brazil) Fluminense (A)	6	3	2	1	5	5	0	11		0–3	1–1	1–0
2	(Brazil) Grêmio (A)	6	2	2	2	10	6	+4	8	0–0		1–2	4–1
3	(Chile) Huachipato	6	2	2	2	10	8	+2	8	1–2	1–1		1–3
4	(Venezuela) Caracas	6	2	0	4	6	12	−6	6	0–1	2–1	0–4	

Source: RSSSF
Legend: Blue = home team win; Yellow = draw; Red = away team win.
(A) Advanced to the round of 16

== Knockout stage ==
In the knockout stage, the 16 teams played a single-elimination tournament, with the following rules:

- Each tie was played on a home-and-away two-legged basis, with the higher-seeded team hosting the second leg. However, CONMEBOL required that the second leg of the finals be played in South America, i.e., a finalist from Mexico had to host the first leg regardless of seeding.
- In the round of 16, quarterfinals, and semifinals, if tied on aggregate, the away goals rule was used. If still tied, a penalty shoot-out was used to determine the winner (no extra time was played).
- In the finals, if tied on aggregate, the away goals rule was not used, and 30 minutes of extra time were played. If still tied after extra time, a penalty shoot-out was used to determine the winner.
- If there were two semifinalists from the same association, they had to play each other.

=== Seeding ===
The qualified teams were seeded in the knockout stage according to their results in the second stage, with the group winners seeded 1–8, and the group runners-up seeded 9–16.

Seed	Team	Pld	W	D	L	GF	GA	GD	Pts	Status
1	(Brazil) Atlético Mineiro	6	5	0	1	16	9	+7	15	Group winners (Seeds 1–8)
2	(Colombia) Santa Fe	6	4	2	0	9	4	+5	14	Group winners (Seeds 1–8)
3	(Paraguay) Olimpia	6	4	1	1	16	7	+9	13	Group winners (Seeds 1–8)
4	(Brazil) Corinthians	6	4	1	1	10	2	+8	13	Group winners (Seeds 1–8)
5	(Argentina) Vélez Sarsfield	6	4	1	1	10	3	+7	13	Group winners (Seeds 1–8)
6	(Brazil) Fluminense	6	3	2	1	5	5	0	11	Group winners (Seeds 1–8)
7	(Uruguay) Nacional	6	3	1	2	10	6	+4	10	Group winners (Seeds 1–8)
8	(Brazil) Palmeiras	6	3	0	3	5	5	0	9	Group winners (Seeds 1–8)
9	(Mexico) Tijuana	6	4	1	1	8	4	+4	13	Group runners-up (Seeds 9–16)
10	(Peru) Real Garcilaso	6	3	1	2	8	7	+1	10	Group runners-up (Seeds 9–16)
11	(Ecuador) Emelec	6	3	1	2	5	4	+1	10	Group runners-up (Seeds 9–16)
12	(Argentina) Newell's Old Boys	6	3	0	3	11	10	+1	9	Group runners-up (Seeds 9–16)
13	(Argentina) Boca Juniors	6	3	0	3	7	7	0	9	Group runners-up (Seeds 9–16)
14	(Argentina) Tigre	6	3	0	3	9	10	−1	9	Group runners-up (Seeds 9–16)
15	(Brazil) Grêmio	6	2	2	2	10	6	+4	8	Group runners-up (Seeds 9–16)
16	(Brazil) São Paulo	6	2	1	3	8	8	0	7	Group runners-up (Seeds 9–16)

Rules for classification: 1. Higher position in group; 2. Points; 3. Goal difference; 4. Goals scored; 5. Away goals scored; 6. Drawing of lots.

=== Bracket ===
Round of 16
11	(Ecuador) Emelec	2	0	2
6	(Brazil) Fluminense	1	2	3
14	(Argentina) Tigre	2	0	2
3	(Paraguay) Olimpia	1	2	3
10	(Peru) Real Garcilaso (p)	1	0	1 (4)
7	(Uruguay) Nacional	0	1	1 (1)
15	(Brazil) Grêmio	2	0	2
2	(Colombia) Santa Fe (a)	1	1	2
13	(Argentina) Boca Juniors	1	1	2
4	(Brazil) Corinthians	0	1	1
12	(Argentina) Newell's Old Boys (a)	0	2	2
5	(Argentina) Vélez Sarsfield	1	1	2
9	(Mexico) Tijuana	0	2	2
8	(Brazil) Palmeiras	0	1	1
16	(Brazil) São Paulo	1	1	2
1	(Brazil) Atlético Mineiro	2	4	6

Quarterfinals
6	(Brazil) Fluminense	0	1	1
3	(Paraguay) Olimpia	0	2	2
10	(Peru) Real Garcilaso	1	0	1
2	(Colombia) Santa Fe	3	2	5
13	(Argentina) Boca Juniors	0	0	0 (9)
12	(Argentina) Newell's Old Boys (p)	0	0	0 (10)
9	(Mexico) Tijuana	2	1	3
1	(Brazil) Atlético Mineiro (a)	2	1	3

Semifinals
3	(Paraguay) Olimpia	2	0	2
2	(Colombia) Santa Fe	0	1	1
12	(Argentina) Newell's Old Boys	2	0	2 (2)
1	(Brazil) Atlético Mineiro (p)	0	2	2 (3)

Finals
3	(Paraguay) Olimpia	2	0	2 (3)
1	(Brazil) Atlético Mineiro (p)	0	2	2 (4)

=== Round of 16 ===
Team 1	Agg.	Team 2	1st leg	2nd leg
São Paulo (Brazil)	2–6	(Brazil) Atlético Mineiro	1–2	1–4
Grêmio (Brazil)	2–2 (a)	(Colombia) Santa Fe	2–1	0–1
Tigre (Argentina)	2–3	(Paraguay) Olimpia	2–1	0–2
Boca Juniors (Argentina)	2–1	(Brazil) Corinthians	1–0	1–1
Newell's Old Boys (Argentina)	2–2 (a)	(Argentina) Vélez Sarsfield	0–1	2–1
Emelec (Ecuador)	2–3	(Brazil) Fluminense	2–1	0–2
Real Garcilaso (Peru)	1–1 (4–1 p)	(Uruguay) Nacional	1–0	0–1
Tijuana (Mexico)	2–1	(Brazil) Palmeiras	0–0	2–1

=== Quarterfinals ===
Team 1	Agg.	Team 2	1st leg	2nd leg
Tijuana (Mexico)	3–3 (a)	(Brazil) Atlético Mineiro	2–2	1–1
Real Garcilaso (Peru)	1–5	(Colombia) Santa Fe	1–3	0–2
Fluminense (Brazil)	1–2	(Paraguay) Olimpia	0–0	1–2
Boca Juniors (Argentina)	0–0 (9–10 p)	(Argentina) Newell's Old Boys	0–0	0–0

=== Semifinals ===
Team 1	Agg.	Team 2	1st leg	2nd leg
Newell's Old Boys (Argentina)	2–2 (2–3 p)	(Brazil) Atlético Mineiro	2–0	0–2
Olimpia (Paraguay)	2–1	(Colombia) Santa Fe	2–0	0–1

=== Finals ===
The finals were played on a home-and-away two-legged basis, with the higher-seeded team hosting the second leg. If tied on aggregate, the away goals rule was not used, and 30 minutes of extra time were played. If still tied after extra time, a penalty shoot-out was used to determine the winner.

17 July 2013
20:50 UTC−4

Olimpia (Paraguay)	2–0	(Brazil) Atlético Mineiro
A. Silva 23'; Pittoni 90+4'	Report

Estadio Defensores del Chaco, Asunción
Attendance: 35,000
Referee: Néstor Pitana (Argentina)

24 July 2013
21:50 UTC−3

Atlético Mineiro (Brazil)	2–0 (a.e.t.)	(Paraguay) Olimpia
Jô 47'; Leonardo Silva 87'	Report
Penalties
Alecsandro (penalty scored); Guilherme (penalty scored); Jô (penalty scored); Leonardo Silva (penalty scored)	4–3	(penalty missed) Miranda; (penalty scored) Ferreyra; (penalty scored) Candia; (penalty scored) Aranda; (penalty missed) Giménez

Estádio Governador Magalhães Pinto (Mineirão), Belo Horizonte
Attendance: 56,557
Referee: Wilmar Roldán (Colombia)

Tied 2–2 on aggregate, Atlético Mineiro won on penalties.

== Statistics ==
=== Top goalscorers ===
Rank	Player	Team	Goals
1	(Brazil) Jô	(Brazil) Atlético Mineiro	7
2	(Brazil) Diego Tardelli	(Brazil) Atlético Mineiro	6
2	(Argentina) Ignacio Scocco	(Argentina) Newell's Old Boys	6
4	(Paraguay) Fredy Bareiro	(Paraguay) Olimpia	5
4	(Brazil) Luís Fabiano	(Brazil) São Paulo	5
4	(Uruguay) Braian Rodríguez	(Chile) Huachipato	5
4	(Uruguay) Juan Manuel Salgueiro	(Paraguay) Olimpia	5
8	(Peru) Irven Ávila	(Peru) Sporting Cristal	4
8	(Brazil) Bernard	(Brazil) Atlético Mineiro	4
8	(Colombia) Cristian Martínez Borja	(Colombia) Santa Fe	4
8	(Argentina) Rubén Botta	(Argentina) Tigre	4
8	(Argentina) Juan Carlos Ferreyra	(Paraguay) Olimpia	4
8	(Peru) Paolo Guerrero	(Brazil) Corinthians	4
8	(Brazil) Jádson	(Brazil) São Paulo	4
8	(Paraguay) Rogerio Leichtweis	(Colombia) Deportes Tolima	4
8	(Ecuador) Fidel Martínez	(Mexico) Tijuana	4
8	(Colombia) Wilder Medina	(Colombia) Santa Fe	4
8	(Argentina) Matías Pérez García	(Argentina) Tigre	4
8	(Brazil) Ronaldinho	(Brazil) Atlético Mineiro	4
8	(Chile) Manuel Villalobos	(Chile) Iquique	4

=== Team of the Season ===
Position	Player	Team
Goalkeeper	(Uruguay) Martín Silva	(Paraguay) Olimpia
Defenders	(Brazil) Marcos Rocha	(Brazil) Atlético Mineiro
Defenders	(Colombia) Carlos Valdés	(Colombia) Santa Fe
Defenders	(Brazil) Réver	(Brazil) Atlético Mineiro
Defenders	(Argentina) Lucas Orbán	(Argentina) Tigre
Midfielders	(Mexico) Fernando Arce	(Mexico) Tijuana
Midfielders	(Paraguay) Wilson Pittoni	(Paraguay) Olimpia
Midfielders	(Brazil) Ronaldinho	(Brazil) Atlético Mineiro
Forwards	(Uruguay) Juan Manuel Salgueiro	(Paraguay) Olimpia
Forwards	(Argentina) Ignacio Scocco	(Argentina) Newell's Old Boys
Forwards	(Brazil) Diego Tardelli	(Brazil) Atlético Mineiro

== See also ==
- 2013 FIFA Club World Cup
- 2013 Copa Sudamericana
- 2014 Recopa Sudamericana
