= 2014 Liga Deportiva Universitaria de Quito season =

LDU Quito
2014 season
- President: Carlos Arroyo
- Manager: Luis Zubeldía
- Stadium: Estadio Casa Blanca
- Serie A: First Stage: 5th Second Stage: 4th Aggregate: 4th
- Top goalscorer: League: Juan Luis Anangonó (11 goals); All: Juan Luis Anangonó (11 goals)
- Highest home attendance: 27,211; (November 23 v. Barcelona)
- Lowest home attendance: 1,467; (September 26 v. Manta)
- Average home league attendance: 6,918
Home colours	Away colours

Liga Deportiva Universitaria de Quito's 2014 season was the club's 84th year of existence, the 61st year in professional football, and the 53rd in the top level of professional football in Ecuador.

== Club ==
=== Personnel ===
President: Carlos Arroyo
Honorary President: Rodrigo Paz
President of the Executive Commission: Esteban Paz
President of the Football Commission: Edwin Ripalda
Vice-President of the Football Commission: Patricio Torres
Sporting manager: Santiago Jácome

=== Coaching staff ===
Manager: Luis Zubeldía
Assistant manager: Maximiliano Cuberas, Carlos Grueso
Physical trainer: Lucas Vivas
Goalkeeper trainer: Gustavo Flores

=== Kits ===
Supplier: Umbro
Sponsor(s): Budweiser, Chevrolet, Tropical, Discover, DirecTV, Roland

== Squad information ==
Liga's squad for the season is allowed a maximum of four foreign players at any one time, and a maximum of eight throughout the season. At the start of the season, Liga was mandated to start one under-19 player in each match. The jersey numbers in the main table (directly below) refer to the number on their domestic league jersey. The under-19 players will wear a jersey number of at least #50.

N	Pos	Nat.	Player	Age	Since	App	Goals	Notes
1	GK	ECU	Walter Chávez	19	2011	0	0	
2	DF	ECU	Norberto Araujo (captain)	35	2007	206	0	
3	DF	ECU	Luis Luna	25	2012	10	0	
5	DF	URU	Gerardo Alcoba	29	2014	0	0	
6	MF	ECU	Danny Cabezas	21	2014	0	0	
8	MF	ECU	Fernando Hidalgo	28	2011	124	3	
9	FW	ECU	Luis Congo	24	2014	0	0	
10	MF	ECU	Hólger Matamoros	28	2014	0	0	
11	FW	URU	Jonathan Ramis	24	2014	0	0	
12	DF	ECU	José Madrid	25	2013	28	1	
13	DF	ECU	Néicer Reasco	36	2008	497	35	Previously with the club from '97–'00 and '01–'06
14	DF	ECU	Diego Calderón	27	2014	210	4	Previously with the club from '05 and '07–'12
15	DF	ECU	Carlos Arboleda	22	2013	24	0	
19	MF	ARG	Diego Alberto Morales	27	2014	0	0	
20	MF	PAR	Enrique Vera	34	2013	163	10	Previously with the club from '06–'08, '09–'10 and '11–'12
21	FW	ECU	Juan Luis Anangonó	25	2014	0	0	
22	GK	ECU	Alexander Domínguez	26	2006	214	0	
23	DF	ECU	Koob Hurtado	28	2013	11	0	
25	GK	ECU	Daniel Viteri	32	2011	26	0	Previously with the club from '08–'09
50	MF	ECU	Jefferson Intriago	17	2014	0	0	U-19 player
51	FW	ECU	Hancel Batalla	16	2014	0	0	U-19 player
52	FW	ECU	Diego Hurtado	18	2011	7	0	U-19 player
53	DF	ECU	Luis Cangá	18	2014	0	0	U-19 player
55	MF	ECU	José Cevallos Enríquez	19	2014	45	9	U-19 player, Previously with the club from '11–'12

Note: Caps and goals are of the national league and are current as of the beginning of the season.

=== Winter transfers ===
Players In
Name	Nat	Pos	Age	Moving from
Luciano Balbi	ARG	DF	24	Lanús (Argentina)
Diego Calderón	ECU	DF	27	Colorado Rapids (United States)
Luis Cangá	ECU	DF	18	Promoted from youth squad
Jefferson Intriago	ECU	MF	17	Promoted from youth squad
Eduardo Ledesma	PAR	MF	28	Rosario Central (Argentina)
Hólger Matamoros	ECU	MF	28	Barcelona SC (Ecuador)
Diego Alberto Morales	ARG	MF	27	Náutico (Brazil)
Arcenio Nazareno	ECU	MF	20	Promoted from reserve team
Hancel Batalla	ECU	FW	16	Promoted from youth squad
Félix Borja	ECU	FW	30	Puebla (Mexico)
Luis Congo	ECU	FW	24	Deportivo Quito (Ecuador)

Players Out
Name	Nat	Pos	Age	Moving to
Paúl Ambrosi	ECU	DF	33	Olmedo (Ecuador)
Ignacio Canuto	ARG	DF	27	Tigre (Argentina)
Eduardo Morante	ECU	DF	26	Deportivo Cuenca (Ecuador)
Carlos Feraud	ECU	MF	23	Deportivo Quito (Ecuador)
Romário Ibarra	ECU	MF	19	Universidad Católica (Ecuador)
Édison Méndez	ECU	MF	34	Independiente Santa Fe (Colombia)
Francisco Rojas	ECU	MF	22	Deportivo Quito (Ecuador)
Luis Saritama	ECU	MF	30	Barcelona SC (Ecuador) (loan)
Hugo Vélez	ECU	MF	27	Universidad Católica (Ecuador)
Jaime Ayoví	ECU	FW	25	Tijuana (Mexico)
Julián Benítez	PAR	FW	26	Nacional (Paraguay)
Gustavo Bou	ARG	FW	23	Gimnasia (LP) (Argentina)
Carlos Garcés	ECU	FW	23	Deportivo Quito (Ecuador)
Luis Santana	ECU	FW	22	Deportivo Cuenca (Ecuador) (loan)

=== Summer transfers ===
On May 13, 2014, Liga de Quito announced that Eduardo Ledesma and Luciano Balbi left the club. The club hired Gerardo Alcoba and Jonathan Ramis as the new foreign players.

Players In
Name	Nat	Pos	Age	Moving from
Gerardo Alcoba	URU	DF	29	Colón (Argentina)
Danny Cabezas	ECU	MF	21	River Plate Ecuador
José Cevallos Enríquez	ECU	MF	19	Juventus FC (Italy) (loan return)
Juan Luis Anangonó	ECU	FW	25	Chicago Fire (United States) (loan)
Jonathan Ramis	URU	FW	24	Godoy Cruz (Argentina)

Players Out
Name	Nat	Pos	Age	Moving to
Luciano Balbi	ARG	DF	25	Lanús (Argentina) (loan return)
Gabriel Corozo	ECU	DF	19	Granada B (Spain)
Luis Bolaños	ECU	MF	29	Chivas USA (United States)
Eduardo Ledesma	PAR	MF	28	Olimpia (Paraguay)
Arcenio Nazareno	ECU	MF	21	ESPOLI (Ecuador)
Félix Borja	ECU	FW	31	Chivas USA (United States)
Kevin Mercado	ECU	FW	19	Granada B (Spain)

== Competitions ==
=== Pre-season friendlies ===
January 11	LDU Quito	3–0	Universidad Católica	Complejo de Pomasqui
	Bolaños; Congo; Batallas

January 11	LDU Quito	1–0	Universidad Católica	Complejo de Pomasqui
	Mercado

January 15	Independiente del Valle	0–1	LDU Quito	Complejo Independiente del Valle
			Matamoros

January 15	Independiente del Valle	3–1	LDU Quito	Complejo Independiente del Valle
	? ? ?		Santana

January 18 La Noche Blanca	LDU Quito	3–0	América de Cali	Quito
18:30 UTC−05:00	Reasco 2'; Congo 14'; Cangá 33'			Stadium: Estadio Casa Blanca; Referee: Diego Lara

=== Serie A ===
2014 was LDU Quito's 53rd season in the Serie A.

==== First stage ====
Pos	Team	Pld	W	D	L	GF	GA	GD	Pts
3	LDU Loja	22	11	3	8	25	31	−6	36
4	Barcelona	22	10	5	7	26	18	+8	35
5	LDU Quito	22	7	8	7	20	22	−2	29
6	Universidad Católica	22	8	4	10	26	28	−2	28
7	El Nacional	22	8	3	11	26	35	−9	27

Updated to match(es) played on 3 August 2014. Source: Ecuafutbol

Overall								Home						Away					
Pld	W	D	L	GF	GA	GD	Pts	W	D	L	GF	GA	GD	W	D	L	GF	GA	GD
22	7	8	7	20	22	−2	29	5	4	2	15	11	+4	2	4	5	5	11	−6

January 25 Round 1	Manta	1–0	LDU Quito	Manta
12:00 UTC−05:00	Palacios 42'	Report		Stadium: Estadio Jocay; Attendance: 682; Referee: Omar Ponce

January 29 Round 2	LDU Quito	2–2	LDU Loja	Quito
19:00 UTC−05:00	Congo 13'; Bolaños 44'	Report	Larrea 69'; Carando 85' (pen.)	Stadium: Estadio Casa Blanca; Attendance: 4,809; Referee: Daniel Salazar

February 2 Round 3	LDU Quito	1–0	El Nacional	Quito
12:00 UTC−05:00	Bolaños 48'	Report		Stadium: Estadio Casa Blanca; Attendance: 11,266; Referee: Samuel Haro

February 9 Round 4	Barcelona	0–0	LDU Quito	Guayaquil
16:00 UTC−05:00		Report		Stadium: Estadio Monumental Banco Pichincha; Attendance: 17,287; Referee: Diego Lara

February 16 Round 5	LDU Quito	0–0	Mushuc Runa	Quito
11:30 UTC−05:00		Report		Stadium: Estadio Casa Blanca; Attendance: 6,461; Referee: Édgar Hinostroza

February 21 Round 6	Deportivo Quito	1–1	LDU Quito	Quito
19:15 UTC−05:00	Estupiñán 90+4' (pen.)	Report	Borja 73'	Stadium: Estadio Olímpico Atahualpa; Attendance: 16,460; Referee: José Luis Espinel

February 28 Round 7	LDU Quito	3–0	Deportivo Cuenca	Quito
19:15 UTC−05:00	Madrid 42'; Borja 48'; Vera 85'	Report		Stadium: Estadio Casa Blanca; Attendance: 2,707; Referee: Roddy Zambrano

March 9 Round 8	Independiente del Valle	0–0	LDU Quito	Sangolquí
11:30 UTC−05:00		Report		Stadium: Estadio Rumiñahui; Attendance: 3,917; Referee: Omar Ponce

March 15 Round 9	LDU Quito	0–2	Universidad Católica	Quito
17:00 UTC−05:00		Report	Cangá 50' (o.g.); Wila 86'	Stadium: Estadio Casa Blanca; Attendance: 3,616; Referee: Vinicio Espinel

March 23 Round 10	Emelec	3–0	LDU Quito	Guayaquil
17:00 UTC−05:00	Caicedo 8'; Bolaños 25'; Burbano 90+1'	Report		Stadium: Estadio George Capwell; Attendance: 13,903; Referee: Carlos Orbe

March 30 Round 11	LDU Quito	2–2	Olmedo	Quito
11:30 UTC−05:00	Congo 8', 58'	Report	Palacios 90'; Cano 90+1'	Stadium: Estadio Casa Blanca; Attendance: 3,289; Referee: Carlos Vera

April 6 Round 12	Olmedo	1–0	LDU Quito	Riobamba
11:45 UTC−05:00	Cano 46'	Report		Stadium: Estadio Olímpico de Riobamba; Attendance: 6,635; Referee: Juan Albarracín

April 13 Round 13	LDU Quito	0–0	Emelec	Quito
11:30 UTC−05:00		Report		Stadium: Estadio Casa Blanca; Attendance: 15,202; Referee: Daniel Salazar

April 19 Round 14	Universidad Católica	3–1	LDU Quito	Quito
12:00 UTC−05:00	Wila 17' (pen.), 84'; Patta 77'	Report	Matamoros 46'	Stadium: Estadio Olímpico Atahualpa; Attendance: 3,863; Referee: Roddy Zambrano

April 27 Round 15	LDU Quito	3–2	Independiente del Valle	Ibarra
12:00 UTC−05:00	Congo 21'; Hidalgo 23', 51'	Report	Núñez 9'; Solís 63'	Stadium: Estadio Olímpico de Ibarra; Attendance: 6,127; Referee: José Luis Espinel

May 2 Round 16	Deportivo Cuenca	0–0	LDU Quito	Cuenca
20:00 UTC−05:00		Report		Stadium: Estadio Alejandro Serrano Aguilar; Attendance: 10,872; Referee: Carlos Vera

May 10 Round 17	LDU Quito	2–0	Deportivo Quito	Quito
19:00 UTC−05:00	Matamoros 56'; Congo 71' (pen.)	Report		Stadium: Estadio Casa Blanca; Attendance: 7,543; Referee: Daniel Salazar

July 6 Round 18	Mushuc Runa	1–2	LDU Quito	Ambato
13:30 UTC−05:00	Barreiro 37'	Report	Vera 17'; Matamoros 33'	Stadium: Estadio Bellavista; Attendance: 2,757; Referee: José Zambrano

July 12 Round 19	LDU Quito	2–1	Barcelona	Quito
11:30 UTC−05:00	Anangonó 19'; K. Hurtado 56'	Report	Oyola 10'	Stadium: Estadio Casa Blanca; Attendance: 11,218; Referee: Vinicio Espinel

July 20 Round 20	El Nacional	0–1	LDU Quito	Quito
12:00 UTC−05:00		Report	Anangonó 35' (pen.)	Stadium: Estadio Olímpico Atahualpa; Attendance: 14,047; Referee: Omar Ponce

July 30 Round 21	LDU Loja	1–0	LDU Quito	Loja
19:30 UTC−05:00	Uchuari 38'	Report		Stadium: Estadio Federativo Reina del Cisne; Attendance: 5,622; Referee: Édgar Hinostroza

August 3 Round 22	LDU Quito	0–2	Manta	Quito
11:30 UTC−05:00		Report	Mina 3'; Madrid 26' (o.g.)	Stadium: Estadio Casa Blanca; Attendance: 0 Referee: Juan Carlos Albarracín

==== Second stage ====
Pos	Team	Pld	W	D	L	GF	GA	GD	Pts
2	Independiente del Valle	22	14	4	4	42	18	+24	46
3	Emelec	22	14	2	6	40	22	+18	44
4	LDU Quito	22	11	7	4	38	22	+16	40
5	El Nacional	22	8	5	9	23	26	−3	29
6	Universidad Católica	22	8	4	10	25	30	−5	28

Updated to match(es) played on 14 December 2014. Source: Ecuafutbol

Overall								Home						Away					
Pld	W	D	L	GF	GA	GD	Pts	W	D	L	GF	GA	GD	W	D	L	GF	GA	GD
22	11	7	4	38	22	+16	40	7	3	1	24	8	+16	4	4	3	14	14	0

August 9 Round 1	LDU Quito	1–1	LDU Loja	Quito
12:00 UTC−05:00	Congo 56'	Report	Uchuari 43'	Stadium: Estadio Casa Blanca; Attendance: 2,220; Referee: José Ramón Zambrano

August 13 Round 2	Universidad Católica	1–2	LDU Quito	Quito
19:15 UTC−05:00	Cangá 90+1'	Report	Matomoros 74'; Anangonó 86'	Stadium: Estadio Olímpico Atahualpa; Attendance: 2,258; Referee: Diego Lara

August 27 Round 3 (Postponed)	LDU Quito	3–0	Deportivo Quito	Quito
19:15 UTC−05:00	Ramis 18'; Anangonó 63'; Matomoros 73'	Report		Stadium: Estadio Casa Blanca; Attendance: 7,089; Referee: Carlos Vera
Note: The match was originally scheduled for August 17, it was postponed due to the earthquake of 5.1 degrees and its aftershocks that affected Quito.

August 31 Round 5	Barcelona	1–0	LDU Quito	Guayaquil
16:45 UTC−05:00	Oyola 2'	Report		Stadium: Estadio Monumental Banco Pichincha; Attendance: 17,903; Referee: Carlos Orbe

September 14 Round 6	LDU Quito	1–1	Deportivo Cuenca	Quito
11:30 UTC−05:00	Hidalgo 75'	Report	Frezzotti 88'	Stadium: Estadio Casa Blanca; Attendance: 3,474; Referee: Omar Ponce

September 21 Round 7	Olmedo	1–1	LDU Quito	Riobamba
12:00 UTC−05:00	Navarro 57'	Report	Araujo 82'	Stadium: Estadio Olímpico de Riobamba; Attendance: 3,864; Referee: Diego Lara

September 26 Round 8	LDU Quito	2–0	Manta	Quito
19:30 UTC−05:00	Ramis 8'; D. Hurtado 90+4'	Report		Stadium: Estadio Casa Blanca; Attendance: 1,467; Referee: Roddy Zambrano

October 1 Round 9	El Nacional	0–0	LDU Quito	Quito
19:15 UTC−05:00		Report		Stadium: Estadio Olímpico Atahualpa; Attendance: 17,899; Referee: Juan Carlos Albarracín

October 5 Round 10	LDU Quito	2–1	Emelec	Quito
11:30 UTC−05:00	Matamoros 27'; Ramis 90+2'	Report	Bolaños 65' (pen.)	Stadium: Estadio Casa Blanca; Attendance: 9,590; Referee: Vinicio Espinel

October 19 Round 11	Mushuc Runa	1–1	LDU Quito	Ambato
13:30 UTC−05:00	Hidalgo 90+3' (o.g.)	Report	Vera 78'	Stadium: Estadio Bellavista; Attendance: 8,439; Referee: Omar Ponce

October 22 Round 4 (Postponed)	Independiente del Valle	3–1	LDU Quito	Sangolquí
19:00 UTC−05:00	Angulo 1'; Sornoza 15'; Núñez 90+2'	Report	Ramis 76'	Stadium: Estadio Rumiñahui; Attendance: 2,394; Referee: José Luis Espinel
Note: The match was postponed, by request, because of Independiente's participation in the Copa Sudamericana.

October 26 Round 12	LDU Quito	5–1	Mushuc Runa	Quito
11:30 UTC−05:00	Anangonó 15', 77'; Morales 32' (pen.), 45+2'; Cangá 70'	Report	Barreiro 37' (pen.)	Stadium: Estadio Casa Blanca; Attendance: 2,641; Referee: Carlos Vera

November 2 Round 13	Emelec	0–1	LDU Quito	Guayaquil
17:00 UTC−05:00		Report	Alcoba 40'	Stadium: Estadio George Capwell; Attendance: 15,540; Referee: Diego Lara

November 5 Round 14	LDU Quito	2–1	El Nacional	Quito
19:00 UTC−05:00	Ramis 46'; Anangonó 70'	Report	Valencia 29'	Stadium: Estadio Casa Blanca; Attendance: 7,365; Referee: Omar Ponce

November 9 Round 15	Manta	3–3	LDU Quito	Manta
12:00 UTC−05:00	Castilo 32', 60', 77' (pen.)	Report	Matamoros 46'; Morales 49'; Anangonó 58'	Stadium: Estadio Jocay; Attendance: 1,942; Referee: Samuel Haro

November 14 Round 16	LDU Quito	5–1	Olmedo	Quito
19:15 UTC−05:00	Angulo 48' (o.g.); Hidalgo 59'; Anangonó 61'; Morales 69'; Araujo 83'	Report	Navarro 44' (pen.)	Stadium: Estadio Casa Blanca; Attendance: 2,974; Referee: Roddy Zambrano

November 19 Round 17	Deportivo Cuenca	1–2	LDU Quito	Cuenca
19:30 UTC−05:00	Cobelli 42'	Report	Cangá 29'; Morales 88'	Stadium: Estadio Alejandro Serrano Aguilar; Attendance: 8,960; Referee: Édgar Hinostroza

November 23 Round 18	LDU Quito	0–0	Barcelona	Quito
11:30 UTC−05:00		Report		Stadium: Estadio Casa Blanca; Attendance: 27,211; Referee: Carlos Vera

November 30 Round 19	LDU Quito	2–0	Independiente del Valle	Quito
11:30 UTC−05:00	Morales 6'; Batalla 70'	Report		Stadium: Estadio Casa Blanca; Attendance: 9,758; Referee: Roddy Zambrano

December 7 Round 20	Deportivo Quito	2–3	LDU Quito	Quito
11:30 UTC−05:00	Calderón 66'; Lara 68'	Report	Anangonó 22'; Congo 53'; Alcoba 79'	Stadium: Estadio Olímpico Atahualpa; Attendance: 16,327; Referee: Carlos Vera

December 10 Round 21	LDU Quito	1–2	Universidad Católica	Quito
19:00 UTC−05:00	Anangonó 64'	Report	Patta 72'; Ibarra 90'	Stadium: Estadio Casa Blanca; Attendance: 6,177; Referee: Omar Ponce

December 14 Round 22	LDU Loja	1–0	LDU Quito	Loja
12:00 UTC−05:00	Villacrés 87' (pen.)			Stadium: Estadio Federativo Reina del Cisne; Referee: Carlos Orbe

== Player statistics ==
Num	Pos	Player	App	Goal	Yellow card	Red card	App	Goal	Yellow card	Red card
Num	Pos	Player	Serie A				Total			
1	GK	Walter Chávez	—	—	—	—	—	—	—	—
2	DF	Norberto Araujo	42	2	7	1	42	2	7	1
3	DF	Luis Luna	8	—	2	—	8	—	2	—
5	DF	Gerardo Alcoba	19	2	7	—	19	2	7	—
6	MF	Danny Cabezas	4	—	—	—	4	—	—	—
8	MF	Fernando Hidalgo	41	4	10	—	41	4	10	—
9	FW	Luis Congo	33	7	6	—	33	7	6	—
10	MF	Hólger Matamoros	34	7	8	—	34	7	8	—
11	FW	Jonathan Ramis	17	5	8	1	17	5	8	1
12	DF	José Madrid	36	1	9	—	36	1	9	—
13	DF	Néicer Reasco	27	—	1	—	27	—	1	—
14	DF	Diego Calderón	12	—	4	—	12	—	4	—
15	DF	Carlos Arboleda	1	—	—	—	1	—	—	—
19	MF	Diego Alberto Morales	32	6	4	—	32	6	4	—
20	MF	Enrique Vera	37	3	13	2	37	3	13	2
21	FW	Juan Luis Anangonó	25	11	3	—	25	11	3	—
22	GK	Alexander Domínguez	26	—	3	—	26	—	3	—
23	DF	Koob Hurtado	12	1	3	—	12	1	3	—
25	GK	Daniel Viteri	18	—	4	1	18	—	4	1
50	MF	Jefferson Intriago	33	—	6	1	33	—	6	1
51	FW	Hancel Batalla	27	1	1	—	27	1	1	—
52	FW	Diego Hurtado	10	1	—	—	10	1	—	—
53	DF	Luis Cangá	31	2	5	—	31	2	5	—
55	MF	José Cevallos Enríquez	19	—	1	—	19	—	1	—
5	MF	Eduardo Ledesma	12	—	—	—	12	—	—	—
6	DF	Luciano Balbi	10	—	1	—	10	—	1	—
7	MF	Luis Bolaños	17	2	2	—	17	2	2	—
11	FW	Félix Borja	16	2	2	—	16	2	2	—
51	DF	Gabriel Corozo	5	—	2	—	5	—	2	—
54	FW	Kevin Mercado	8	—	2	—	8	—	2	—
Totals			—	57	114	6	—	57	114	6

Last updated: December 14, 2014
Note: Players in italics left the club mid-season.

== Team statistics ==
	Total	Home	Away
Games played	44	22	22
Games won	18	12	6
Games drawn	15	7	8
Games lost	11	3	8
Biggest win	5–1 vs Mushuc Runa; 5–1 vs Olmedo	5–1 vs Mushuc Runa; 5–1 vs Olmedo	2–1 vs Mushuc Runa; 1–0 vs El Nacional; 2–1 vs Universidad Católica; 1–0 vs Emelec; 2–1 vs Deportivo Cuenca; 3–2 vs Deportivo Quito
Biggest loss	0–3 vs Emelec	0–2 vs Universidad Católica; 0–2 vs Manta	0–3 vs Emelec
Clean sheets	15	9	6
Goals scored	58	39	19
Goals conceded	44	19	25
Goal difference	+14	+20	-6
Average GF per game	1.32	1.77	0.86
Average GA per game	1	0.86	1.14
Yellow cards	114	58	56
Red cards	6	1	5
Most appearances	(Ecuador) Norberto Araujo (42)	(Ecuador) Fernando Hidalgo (21)	(Ecuador) Norberto Araujo (22)
Most minutes played	(Ecuador) Norberto Araujo (3741)	(Ecuador) Fernando Hidalgo (1865)	(Ecuador) Norberto Araujo (1941)
Top scorer	(Ecuador) Juan Luis Anangonó (11)	(Ecuador) Juan Luis Anangonó (7)	(Ecuador) Juan Luis Anangonó (4) (Ecuador) Hólger Matamoros (4)
Worst discipline	(Paraguay) Enrique Vera (2) (red card)	(Paraguay) Enrique Vera (1) (red card)	(Paraguay) Enrique Vera (1) (red card) (5) (yellow card)
Penalties for	3/8 (37.5%)	2/4 (50%)	1/4 (25%)
Penalties against	8/11 (72.73%)	4/6 (66.67%)	4/5 (80%)
Points	69/132 (52.27%)	43/66 (65.15%)	26/66 (39.39%)
Winning rate	40.91%	54.55%	27.27%

Last updated: December 14, 2014 Source:Competitive matches
