= 2026 Liga FUTVE =

Venezuelan Primera División season

Liga FUTVE
- Season: 2026
- Dates: 29 January – December 2026
- Relegated: Anzoátegui
- Copa Libertadores: Carabobo; Metropolitanos; Deportivo Táchira; Deportivo La Guaira
- Copa Sudamericana: Academia Puerto Cabello; Portuguesa; Universidad Central; Estudiantes de Mérida
- Matches: 230
- Goals: 594 (2.58 per match)
- Top goalscorer: Rodrigo Pollero (20 goals)
- Biggest home win: Carabobo 5–0 Rayo Zuliano (15 March); La Guaira 6–1 Zamora (16 August)
- Biggest away win: Rayo Zuliano 1–5 UCV (8 March); Metropolitanos 1–5 Carabobo (31 May); Metropolitanos 1–5 La Guaira (22 November)
- Highest scoring: Carabobo 6–3 Anzoátegui (20 April)
- All statistics correct as of 22 November 2026.

The 2026 Liga FUTVE, officially Liga de Fútbol Profesional Venezolano, and known as 2026 Liga FUTVE TriunfoBet for sponsoring purposes, is the 70th season of the Liga FUTVE, the top-flight football league in Venezuela, and the 45th season since the start of its professional era. The season started on 29 January and is scheduled to end in December 2026.

Universidad Central were the defending champions.

== Teams ==
Fourteen teams compete in the season, having fulfilled club licensing requirements: the top 13 teams of the 2025 season as well as the 2025 Liga FUTVE 2 champions Trujillanos, who defeated Titanes in the Liga FUTVE 2 finals on 16 November 2025 to return to the top flight after a four-year absence. Trujillanos replaced Yaracuyanos, relegated at the end of the previous season after finishing last in the aggregate table.

Locations of the 2026 Liga FUTVE teams
Locations of the 2026 Liga FUTVE teams – Caracas

Relegated to 2026 Liga FUTVE 2: 14 / Yaracuyanos	Promoted to 2026 Liga FUTVE: 1 / Trujillanos

=== Stadia and locations ===
Team	City	Stadium	Capacity
Academia Puerto Cabello	Puerto Cabello	La Bombonerita	2,500
Anzoátegui	Puerto La Cruz	José Antonio Anzoátegui	37,485
Carabobo	Valencia	Misael Delgado	10,400
Caracas	Caracas	Olímpico de la UCV	23,940
Deportivo La Guaira	Caracas	Olímpico de la UCV	23,940
Deportivo Táchira	San Cristóbal	Polideportivo de Pueblo Nuevo	38,755
Estudiantes de Mérida	Mérida	Metropolitano de Mérida	42,200
Metropolitanos	Caracas	Olímpico de la UCV	23,940
Monagas	Maturín	Monumental de Maturín	51,796
Portuguesa	Acarigua	General José Antonio Páez	18,000
Rayo Zuliano	Maracaibo	José Pachencho Romero	40,800
Trujillanos	Valera	José Alberto Pérez	25,000
Universidad Central	Caracas	Olímpico de la UCV	23,940
Zamora	Barinas	Agustín Tovar	29,800

=== Personnel and kits ===
Team	Manager	Kit manufacturer	Main shirt sponsors
Academia Puerto Cabello	(Venezuela) Eduardo Saragó	Adidas	CLX Samsung
Anzoátegui	(Argentina) Marcelo Zuleta	Givova	Apuestas Royal, Banco del Tesoro
Carabobo	(Venezuela) Daniel Farías	Runic	Frigilux, Fospuca, Apuestas Royal
Caracas	(Venezuela) Noel Sanvicente	Zeus	1XBET, Maltín Polar
Deportivo La Guaira	(Venezuela) Mariano Rodríguez	Runic	Traki, Apuestas Royal
Deportivo Táchira	(Uruguay) Álvaro Recoba	Boman	TriunfoBet, Rutaca Airlines, Grupo JHS
Estudiantes de Mérida	(Venezuela) Jesús Gómez	Econtex	Daka, Apuestas Royal
Metropolitanos	(Venezuela) Francesco Stifano	RS	Aerolíneas Estelar, Forum Supermayorista
Monagas	(Venezuela) Daniel Velásquez (caretaker)	RS	Banplus
Portuguesa	(Venezuela) Leonardo González	Boman	Apuestas Royal, Alimentos Mary
Rayo Zuliano	(Venezuela) Johanny García	Adidas	Campestre, Daka, Javitour, BDT, Farma Express
Trujillanos	(Argentina) Mariano Echeverría	A2vzla	Fospuca, Bancamiga
Universidad Central	(Venezuela) Luis De Oliveira (caretaker)	Adidas	PDVSA, Bolipuertos, Apuestas Royal, CSC, CANTV, CLX Samsung
Zamora	(Venezuela) Josué Ortiz	Givova	Thundernet, Apuestas Royal

==== Managerial changes ====
Team	Outgoing manager	Manner of departure	Date of vacancy	Position in table	Incoming manager	Date of appointment
Torneo Apertura
Estudiantes de Mérida	(Venezuela) Jesús Ortiz	Resigned	9 October 2025	Pre-season	(Venezuela) Jesús Gómez	30 October 2025
Portuguesa	(Venezuela) Giancarlo Maldonado	End of contract	12 October 2025	Pre-season	(Venezuela) Leonardo González	21 November 2025
Anzoátegui	(Venezuela) Leonardo González	Sacked	23 October 2025	Pre-season	(Venezuela) Adrián Sánchez	5 January 2026
Monagas	(Venezuela) Enrique García	Sacked	17 November 2025	Pre-season	(Ecuador) Octavio Zambrano	2 December 2025
Deportivo Táchira	(Venezuela) Edgar Pérez Greco	End of contract	18 November 2025	Pre-season	(Uruguay) Álvaro Recoba	19 November 2025
Zamora	(Venezuela) José María Morr	Mutual agreement	17 December 2025	Pre-season	(Venezuela) Noel Sanvicente	17 December 2025
Deportivo La Guaira	(Venezuela) Juan Domingo Tolisano	Signed by Venezuela U20	20 January 2026	Pre-season	(Argentina) Héctor Bidoglio	26 January 2026
Trujillanos	(Venezuela) Oswaldo Chaurant	Sacked	10 March 2026	11th	(Venezuela) Pedro Vera	12 March 2026
Anzoátegui	(Venezuela) Adrián Sánchez	Sacked	11 March 2026	12th	(Venezuela) Giancarlo Maldonado	12 March 2026
Caracas	(Venezuela) Fernando Aristeguieta	Resigned	22 April 2026	11th	(Venezuela) Henry Meléndez (Note: Originally as caretaker manager, appointed on a permanent basis on 2 June 2026.)	22 April 2026
Monagas	(Ecuador) Octavio Zambrano	Mutual agreement	28 April 2026	12th	(Venezuela) Jesús Ortiz	12 June 2026
Torneo Clausura
Zamora	(Venezuela) Noel Sanvicente	Resigned	17 June 2026	Pre-tournament	(Venezuela) Josué Ortiz	8 July 2026
Trujillanos	(Venezuela) Pedro Vera	Promoted to sporting director	13 July 2026	Pre-tournament	(Argentina) Mariano Echeverría	13 July 2026
Caracas	(Venezuela) Henry Meléndez	Mutual agreement	15 August 2026	7th	(Venezuela) Noel Sanvicente	16 August 2026
Universidad Central	(Venezuela) Daniel Sasso	Mutual agreement	16 August 2026	12th	(Venezuela) Luis De Oliveira (Note: Caretaker manager.)	16 August 2026
Anzoátegui	(Venezuela) Giancarlo Maldonado	Mutual agreement	27 August 2026	12th	(Argentina) Marcelo Zuleta	27 August 2026
Deportivo La Guaira	(Argentina) Héctor Bidoglio	Mutual agreement	1 October 2026	6th	(Venezuela) Mariano Rodríguez	1 October 2026
Monagas	(Venezuela) Jesús Ortiz	Sacked	5 November 2026	4th, Group B	(Venezuela) Daniel Velásquez	5 November 2026

== Torneo Apertura ==
The Torneo Apertura was the first tournament of the 2026 season. It began on 29 January and ended on 7 June 2026. Carabobo won the tournament after defeating Academia Puerto Cabello 2–1 in the final and advanced to the season's grand final against the Torneo Clausura winners. They also qualified for the 2027 Copa Libertadores, while the runners-up Academia Puerto Cabello were assured of a berth into the 2027 Copa Sudamericana.

=== Regular stage ===
==== Standings ====
Pos	Team	Pld	W	D	L	GF	GA	GD	Pts	Qualification
1	Deportivo La Guaira	13	7	6	0	15	6	+9	27	Advance to the final stages
2	Metropolitanos	13	7	4	2	17	10	+7	25	Advance to the final stages
3	Deportivo Táchira	13	7	3	3	17	12	+5	24	Advance to the final stages
4	Universidad Central	13	7	2	4	24	20	+4	23	Advance to the final stages
5	Portuguesa	13	5	5	3	20	12	+8	20	Advance to the final stages
6	Estudiantes de Mérida	13	6	2	5	21	18	+3	20	Advance to the final stages
7	Carabobo	13	4	7	2	23	14	+9	19	Advance to the final stages
8	Academia Puerto Cabello	13	4	5	4	16	14	+2	17	Advance to the final stages
9	Zamora	13	4	5	4	14	14	0	17	
10	Caracas	13	3	6	4	15	17	−2	15	
11	Rayo Zuliano	13	4	2	7	13	23	−10	14	
12	Monagas	13	3	2	8	14	22	−8	11	
13	Anzoátegui	13	2	3	8	15	25	−10	9	
14	Trujillanos	13	0	4	9	9	26	−17	4	

Source: Liga FUTVE, Soccerway
Rules for classification: 1) Points; 2) Goal difference; 3) Goals scored; 4) Head-to-head points; 5) Wins; 6) Away wins; 7) Fair play points.

==== Results ====
Home \ Away	APC	ANZ	CBO	CAR	DLG	TAC	ESM	MET	MON	POR	RAY	TRU	UCV	ZAM
Academia Puerto Cabello	—	—	—	—	—	1–2	1–2	1–1	—	—	—	3–1	3–0	2–0
Anzoátegui	0–1	—	—	—	0–0	—	0–3	—	—	—	1–3	—	2–3	1–1
Carabobo	1–1	6–3	—	0–0	—	—	—	—	1–0	0–0	5–0	—	4–2	—
Caracas	1–1	1–3	—	—	—	0–1	—	1–0	—	—	2–1	4–2	1–2	—
Deportivo La Guaira	0–0	—	1–1	2–0	—	—	—	—	2–0	0–0	1–0	—	—	—
Deportivo Táchira	—	3–1	2–1	—	2–3	—	1–0	0–1	—	—	—	0–0	—	2–1
Estudiantes de Mérida	—	—	3–2	2–2	0–1	—	—	—	3–2	2–1	1–2	—	—	—
Metropolitanos	—	2–0	1–1	—	2–2	—	2–0	—	1–0	3–2	—	—	—	0–0
Monagas	1–1	1–0	—	1–1	—	2–3	—	—	—	—	3–0	3–1	0–3	—
Portuguesa	3–0	0–3	—	1–1	—	1–0	—	—	4–0	—	1–1	—	3–0	—
Rayo Zuliano	2–1	—	—	—	—	0–0	—	0–1	—	—	—	3–1	1–5	0–1
Trujillanos	—	1–1	1–1	—	0–1	—	0–2	0–1	—	2–2	—	—	—	0–3
Universidad Central	—	—	—	—	0–1	1–1	1–1	3–2	—	—	—	2–0	—	2–1
Zamora	—	—	0–0	1–1	1–1	—	3–2	—	2–1	0–2	—	—	—	—

Source: Liga FUTVE, Soccerway
Legend: Blue = home team win; Yellow = draw; Red = away team win.

=== Final stages ===
The eight teams that advanced to the final stages were drawn into two groups of four teams, with the teams placing first and second at the end of the regular stage being seeded in Group A and Group B, respectively. The two group winners advanced to the final.

==== Group A ====
Pos	Team	Pld	W	D	L	GF	GA	GD	Pts	Qualification	APC	POR	DLG	UCV
1	Academia Puerto Cabello	6	3	1	2	8	7	+1	10	Advance to the Final	—	2–1	1–1	2–1
2	Portuguesa	6	2	2	2	7	8	−1	8		1–0	—	0–2	1–1
3	Deportivo La Guaira	6	1	4	1	5	5	0	7		0–2	1–1	—	0–0
4	Universidad Central	6	1	3	2	8	8	0	6		3–1	2–3	1–1	—

Source: Liga FUTVE
Legend: Blue = home team win; Yellow = draw; Red = away team win.
Rules for classification: 1) Points; 2) Goal difference; 3) Goals scored; 4) Head-to-head points; 5) Head-to-head goal difference; 6) Head-to-head goals for; 7) Head-to-head away goals for; 7) Wins; 8) Away wins; 9) Fair play points; 10) Regular stage points; 11) Regular stage goal difference.

==== Group B ====
Pos	Team	Pld	W	D	L	GF	GA	GD	Pts	Qualification	CBO	TAC	MET	ESM
1	Carabobo	6	3	2	1	10	5	+5	11	Advance to the Final	—	1–1	0–0	1–0
2	Deportivo Táchira	6	3	2	1	8	5	+3	11		3–1	—	1–1	1–0
3	Metropolitanos	6	2	2	2	5	7	−2	8		1–5	0–1	—	2–0
4	Estudiantes de Mérida	6	1	0	5	2	8	−6	3		0–2	2–1	0–1	—

Source: Liga FUTVE
Legend: Blue = home team win; Yellow = draw; Red = away team win.
Rules for classification: 1) Points; 2) Goal difference; 3) Goals scored; 4) Head-to-head points; 5) Head-to-head goal difference; 6) Head-to-head goals for; 7) Head-to-head away goals for; 7) Wins; 8) Away wins; 9) Fair play points; 10) Regular stage points; 11) Regular stage goal difference.

==== Final ====
The final was hosted by Carabobo, who were the higher-placed finalist in the regular stage of the tournament.

7 June 2026
18:00 UTC−4

Carabobo	2–1	Academia Puerto Cabello
Ramírez 26' (pen.); Martínez 58'	Report	Pernía 90+4'

Estadio Misael Delgado, Valencia
Referee: Yender Herrera

== Torneo Clausura ==
The Torneo Clausura is the second and final tournament of the 2026 season. The tournament started on 31 July 2026, and the winners will advance to the season's grand final against the Torneo Apertura winners. They will also qualify for the 2027 Copa Libertadores, while the runners-up will be assured of a berth into the 2027 Copa Sudamericana.

=== Regular stage ===
==== Standings ====
Pos	Team	Pld	W	D	L	GF	GA	GD	Pts	Qualification
1	Metropolitanos	13	10	2	1	30	11	+19	32	Advance to the final stages
2	Deportivo Táchira	13	8	3	2	30	17	+13	27	Advance to the final stages
3	Academia Puerto Cabello	13	6	5	2	19	12	+7	23	Advance to the final stages
4	Carabobo	13	6	4	3	15	10	+5	22	Advance to the final stages
5	Portuguesa	13	4	7	2	14	12	+2	19	Advance to the final stages
6	Monagas	13	5	3	5	17	17	0	18	Advance to the final stages
7	Deportivo La Guaira	13	5	2	6	22	18	+4	17	Advance to the final stages
8	Caracas	13	4	5	4	15	16	−1	17 (Note: Away wins: Caracas 3, Estudiantes de Mérida 1.)	Advance to the final stages
9	Estudiantes de Mérida	13	4	5	4	15	16	−1	17	
10	Universidad Central	13	4	4	5	13	15	−2	16	
11	Trujillanos	13	4	2	7	14	20	−6	14	
12	Rayo Zuliano	13	3	2	8	18	29	−11	11	
13	Anzoátegui	13	2	2	9	8	22	−14	8	
14	Zamora	13	2	2	9	12	27	−15	8	

Source: Liga FUTVE, Soccerway
Rules for classification: 1) Points; 2) Goal difference; 3) Goals scored; 4) Head-to-head points; 5) Wins; 6) Away wins; 7) Fair play points.

==== Results ====
Home \ Away	APC	ANZ	CBO	CAR	DLG	TAC	ESM	MET	MON	POR	RAY	TRU	UCV	ZAM
Academia Puerto Cabello	—	3–0	0–2	3–1	1–1	—	—	—	3–3	2–1	2–0	—	—	—
Anzoátegui	—	—	0–1	1–1	—	0–3 (Note: The match between Anzoátegui and Deportivo Táchira could not be played due to an electrical failure affecting the lighting system of Estadio José Antonio Anzoátegui. In accordance to league regulations, Deportivo Táchira were awarded a 3–0 victory by forfeit.)	—	0–2	1–3	3–4	—	0–0	—	—
Carabobo	—	—	—	—	1–0	2–2	1–0	1–0	—	—	—	2–0	—	0–0
Caracas	—	—	1–1	—	1–2	—	2–2	—	0–1	1–1	—	—	—	4–1
Deportivo La Guaira	—	2–0	—	—	—	2–4	1–2	1–2	—	—	—	1–2	0–2	6–1
Deportivo Táchira	1–1	—	—	0–0	—	—	—	—	3–2	1–0	3–1	—	4–1	—
Estudiantes de Mérida	1–1	1–0	—	—	—	2–0	—	2–2	—	—	—	1–1	1–1	1–0
Metropolitanos	2–1	—	—	3–0	—	3–1	—	—	—	—	4–0	4–1	2–1	—
Monagas	—	—	1–0	—	1–2	—	2–1	0–1	—	0–0	—	—	—	1–0
Portuguesa	—	—	1–0	—	0–0	—	2–1	2–2	—	—	—	1–0	—	1–1
Rayo Zuliano	—	0–1	4–3	1–2	1–4	—	3–0	—	1–1	1–1	—	—	—	—
Trujillanos	0–1	—	—	0–1	—	1–3	—	—	3–1	—	2–4	—	2–0	—
Universidad Central	0–0	1–0	1–1	0–1	—	—	—	—	2–1	0–0	4–1	—	—	—
Zamora	0–1	1–2	—	—	—	2–5	—	1–3	—	—	2–1	1–2	2–0	—

Source: Liga FUTVE, Soccerway
Legend: Blue = home team win; Yellow = draw; Red = away team win.

=== Final stages ===
The eight teams that advanced to the final stages were drawn into two groups of four teams, with the teams placing first and second at the end of the regular stage being seeded in Group A and Group B, respectively. The two group winners advanced to the final.

==== Group A ====
Pos	Team	Pld	W	D	L	GF	GA	GD	Pts	Qualification	CBO	DLG	MET	POR
1	Carabobo	6	3	3	0	10	4	+6	12	Advance to the Final	—	3–1	1–1	1–1
2	Deportivo La Guaira	6	3	1	2	13	8	+5	10		0–0	—	2–2	2–2
3	Metropolitanos	6	0	4	2	6	12	−6	4		0–2	1–5	—	0–0
4	Portuguesa	6	0	4	2	6	11	−5	4		1–3	0–3	2–2	—

Source: Liga FUTVE, Soccerway
Legend: Blue = home team win; Yellow = draw; Red = away team win.
Rules for classification: 1) Points; 2) Goal difference; 3) Goals scored; 4) Head-to-head points; 5) Head-to-head goal difference; 6) Head-to-head goals for; 7) Head-to-head away goals for; 7) Wins; 8) Away wins; 9) Fair play points; 10) Regular stage points; 11) Regular stage goal difference.

==== Group B ====
Pos	Team	Pld	W	D	L	GF	GA	GD	Pts	Qualification	TAC	CAR	APC	MON
1	Deportivo Táchira	6	6	0	0	12	4	+8	18	Advance to the Final	—	2–1	3–2	2–0
2	Caracas	6	2	0	4	8	9	−1	6		1–2	—	1–2	2–3
3	Academia Puerto Cabello	6	2	0	4	6	8	−2	6		0–1	0–1	—	0–1
4	Monagas	6	2	0	4	5	10	−5	6		0–2	0–2	1–2	—

Source: Liga FUTVE, Soccerway
Legend: Blue = home team win; Yellow = draw; Red = away team win.
Rules for classification: 1) Points; 2) Goal difference; 3) Goals scored; 4) Head-to-head points; 5) Head-to-head goal difference; 6) Head-to-head goals for; 7) Head-to-head away goals for; 7) Wins; 8) Away wins; 9) Fair play points; 10) Regular stage points; 11) Regular stage goal difference.

==== Final ====
The final will be hosted by Deportivo Táchira, who were the higher-placed finalist in the regular stage of the tournament.

29 November 2026
--:-- UTC−4

Deportivo Táchira	v	Carabobo

Estadio Polideportivo de Pueblo Nuevo, San Cristóbal

== Grand Final ==
The winners of the Apertura (Carabobo) and Clausura tournaments will play a two-legged final series to decide the season champions (Campeón Absoluto). The season champions will qualify for the Copa Libertadores group stage while the season runners-up will qualify for the Copa Libertadores second stage.

If Carabobo also end up winning the Clausura tournament, they will be awarded the league championship and this series will not be held.

== Aggregate table ==
The results of the regular stage of both the Apertura and Clausura tournaments were combined into a single table to determine the distribution of the remaining Copa Libertadores and Copa Sudamericana berths as well as relegation to Liga FUTVE 2. The best-placed team in this table (other than the league champions) will qualify for the Copa Libertadores group stage, with the next one (also excluding the league runners-up) entering the Copa Libertadores first stage, while the next two teams not yet qualified for an international tournament will enter the Copa Sudamericana first stage. The team placing last in the aggregate table was relegated to the second tier.

Pos	Team	Pld	W	D	L	GF	GA	GD	Pts	Qualification or relegation
1	Metropolitanos (Q)	26	17	6	3	47	21	+26	57	Qualification for Copa Libertadores group stage
2	Deportivo Táchira (T)	26	15	6	5	47	29	+18	51	Qualification for Copa Libertadores (Note: Stage to be determined. The Liga FUTVE champions will qualify for the Copa Libertadores group stage, while the Liga FUTVE runners-up (or the aggregate table's best team not yet qualified) will qualify for the Copa Libertadores second stage.)
3	Deportivo La Guaira (Q)	26	12	8	6	37	24	+13	44	Qualification for Copa Libertadores first stage
4	Carabobo (T)	26	10	11	5	38	24	+14	41	Qualification for Copa Libertadores
5	Academia Puerto Cabello (Q)	26	10	10	6	35	26	+9	40	Qualification for Copa Sudamericana first stage (Note: Academia Puerto Cabello qualified for the Copa Sudamericana first stage as 2026 Apertura runners-up.)
6	Portuguesa (Q)	26	9	12	5	34	24	+10	39	Qualification for Copa Sudamericana first stage
7	Universidad Central (Q)	26	11	6	9	37	35	+2	39	Qualification for Copa Sudamericana first stage
8	Estudiantes de Mérida (Q)	26	10	7	9	36	34	+2	37	Qualification for Copa Sudamericana first stage
9	Caracas	26	7	11	8	30	33	−3	32	
10	Monagas	26	8	5	13	31	39	−8	29	
11	Zamora	26	6	7	13	26	41	−15	25	
12	Rayo Zuliano	26	7	4	15	31	52	−21	25	
13	Trujillanos	26	4	6	16	23	46	−23	18	
14	Anzoátegui (R)	26	4	5	17	23	47	−24	17	Relegation to Liga FUTVE 2

Source: Liga FUTVE
Rules for classification: 1) Points; 2) Goal difference; 3) Goals scored; 4) Head-to-head points; 5) Head-to-head goal difference; 6) Head-to-head goals for; 7) Head-to-head away goals for; 7) Wins; 8) Away wins; 9) Fair play points.
(Q) Qualified for the phase indicated; (R) Relegated; (T) Qualified, but not yet for the particular phase indicated

== Top goalscorers ==
As of 22 November 2026

Rank	Player	Club	Goals
1	(Uruguay) Rodrigo Pollero	Deportivo Táchira	20
2	(Argentina) Jonathan Cañete	Portuguesa	15
2	(Venezuela) Miku Fedor	Metropolitanos	15
4	(Venezuela) Eric Ramírez	Carabobo	13
5	(Colombia) Kevin Quejada	Estudiantes de Mérida	12
6	(Venezuela) Juan Carlos Castellanos	Deportivo La Guaira	11
6	(Venezuela) Ronald Rodríguez	Monagas	11
8	(Ecuador) Kavier Ortiz	Metropolitanos	10
9	(Venezuela) Luis González	Deportivo Táchira / Monagas	9
9	(Venezuela) José Luis Ochoa	Rayo Zuliano	9

Source: Soccerway

== See also ==
- 2026 Copa Venezuela
