= 2026 Copa de Primera =

Paraguayan Primera División season

División de Honor
- Season: 2026
- Dates: 23 January – 29 November 2026
- Champions: Apertura: Olimpia (48th title); Clausura: Olimpia (49th title)
- Relegated: Rubio Ñu; San Lorenzo
- Copa Libertadores: Olimpia; Recoleta (via Copa Paraguay)
- Matches: 250
- Goals: 614 (2.46 per match)
- Top goalscorer: Apertura: Lorenzo Melgarejo and Allan Wlk (13 goals each); Clausura: Three players (8 goals each)
- Biggest home win: Recoleta 5–0 2 de Mayo (18 April); Libertad 5–0 San Lorenzo (1 May); Olimpia 5–0 Rubio Ñu (2 August)
- Biggest away win: San Lorenzo 0–7 Libertad (2 March)
- Highest scoring: San Lorenzo 0–7 Libertad (2 March)
- All statistics correct as of 22 November 2026.

The 2026 Copa de Primera (officially the Copa de Primera Tigo Apostala 2026 for sponsorship reasons) is the 92nd season of the División de Honor, the top-flight professional football league in Paraguay. The season, which consists of two tournaments (Apertura and Clausura), began on 23 January and is scheduled to end on 29 November 2026. The fixture draw for both of the season's tournaments was held on 3 December 2025.

Olimpia won both tournaments played in this season. In the Torneo Apertura, they clinched their forty-eighth league title with three matches in hand after a 1–1 draw with Sportivo Ameliano and a 2–1 loss for Cerro Porteño against Recoleta on 3 May, while in the Torneo Clausura, they secured their forty-ninth league title with two matches to go following a 2–1 win over Sportivo Trinidense on 22 November.

Cerro Porteño entered the season as defending champions, having won the 2025 Clausura tournament.

== Teams ==
Twelve teams compete in the season: the top ten teams in the relegation table of the 2025 season and the top two teams in the 2025 Paraguayan División Intermedia.

=== Team changes ===
General Caballero (JLM) and Tembetary were relegated to the second tier league División Intermedia after ending in the bottom two places of the relegation table at the end of the 2025 season, and they were replaced by the 2025 División Intermedia champions Rubio Ñu and runners-up San Lorenzo.

Rubio Ñu, who returned to the top flight after 8 years, clinched promotion with a 1–0 win over Sportivo Carapeguá on 14 September 2025, while San Lorenzo returned to the Copa de Primera for the first time since 2020 by defeating Fernando de la Mora on 4 October 2025, the final matchday of the División Intermedia tournament.

| Pos. | Relegated from 2025 Copa de Primera |
|---|---|
| 11th | General Caballero (JLM) |
| 12th | Tembetary |

| Pos. | Promoted from 2025 División Intermedia |
|---|---|
| 1st | Rubio Ñu |
| 2nd | San Lorenzo |

=== Stadia and locations ===
Locations of the 2026 Copa de Primera teams outside Asunción
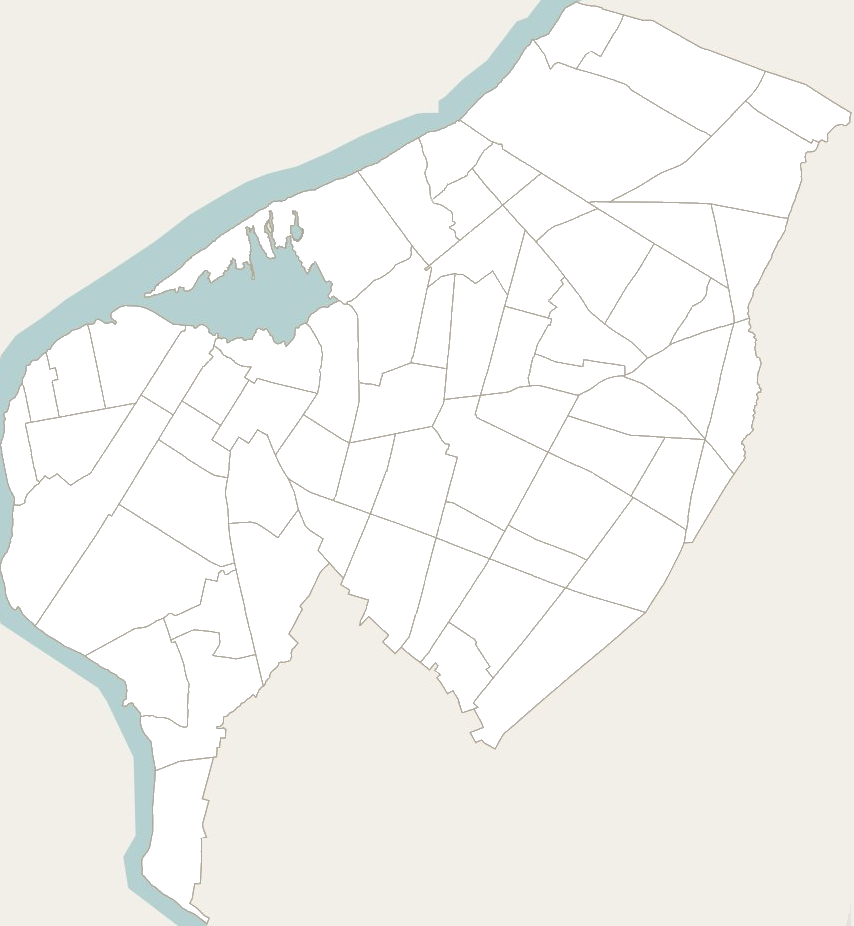
Locations of the 2026 Copa de Primera teams – Asunción

| Team | City | Stadium (Note: Teams occasionally play home matches at Estadio Defensores del Chaco in Asunción.) | Capacity |
|---|---|---|---|
| 2 de Mayo | Pedro Juan Caballero | Río Parapití | 25,000 |
| Cerro Porteño | Asunción | General Pablo Rojas | 45,000 |
| Guaraní | Asunción | La Arboleda (Note: Guaraní play their home matches at Estadio La Arboleda since their stadium Estadio Rogelio Livieres was closed for reconstruction.) | 8,000 |
| Libertad | Asunción | La Huerta | 14,000 |
| Nacional | Asunción | Arsenio Erico | 7,500 |
| Olimpia | Capiatá | Erico Galeano (Note: Olimpia play their home matches at Estadio Erico Galeano since their stadium Estadio Osvaldo Domínguez Dibb in Asunción was closed for reconstruction.) | 13,500 |
| Recoleta | Asunción | Ricardo Gregor (Note: Recoleta play their home matches at Estadio Ricardo Gregor since their stadium Estadio Roque Battilana did not meet APF requirements.) | 4,000 |
| Rubio Ñu | Asunción | La Arboleda | 8,000 |
| San Lorenzo | San Lorenzo | Gunther Vogel | 5,000 |
| Sportivo Ameliano | Villeta | Ameliano Villeta | 7,000 |
| Sportivo Luqueño | Capiatá | Erico Galeano (Note: Sportivo Luqueño play their home matches at Estadio Erico Galeano since their stadium Estadio Feliciano Cáceres in Luque is closed for remodeling works.) | 13,500 |
| Sportivo Trinidense | Asunción | Martín Torres | 3,000 |

=== Personnel and kits ===
| Team | Head coach | Kit manufacturer | Main shirt sponsors |
|---|---|---|---|
| 2 de Mayo | (Paraguay) Eduardo Ledesma | Kyrios | Zero Grau, Banco Continental, Fleming |
| Cerro Porteño | (Argentina) Gustavo Costas | Puma | Tigo, Ueno |
| Guaraní | (Paraguay) Francisco Arce | Kyrios | Tigo, Ueno, Aposta.La |
| Libertad | (Paraguay) Ariel Galeano | Puma | Tigo |
| Nacional | (Argentina) Víctor Bernay | Kappa | Kia, Banco Continental, Coca-Cola, Santa Clara |
| Olimpia | (Argentina) Pablo Sánchez | Nike | Tigo, Ueno |
| Recoleta | (Paraguay) Jorge González | Running Sport | Ueno, BYD, Universidad Central del Paraguay |
| Rubio Ñu | (Argentina) Javier Torrente | Garcis | Lácteos Trébol, Pinturas Bambi |
| San Lorenzo | (Argentina) Pablo Fornasari | Temple | Ochsi |
| Sportivo Ameliano | (Argentina) Roberto Nanni | Netanya Sport | Slots del Sol, Kia, Banco Continental, Ayres |
| Sportivo Luqueño | (Paraguay) Lucas Barrios | Kyrios | Comercial Vírgen del Rosario, Ueno, Betsson |
| Sportivo Trinidense | (Paraguay) José Arrúa | Lotto | Noroda, Lácteos Trébol, Chorti Beef, Ueno |

=== Managerial changes ===
| Team | Outgoing head coach | Manner of departure | Date of vacancy | Position in table | Incoming head coach | Date of appointment |
Torneo Apertura
| Olimpia | (Paraguay) Ever Almeida | Sacked | 26 November 2025 | Pre-season | (Argentina) Pablo Sánchez | 28 November 2025 |
| 2 de Mayo | (Paraguay) Felipe Giménez | Resigned | 27 November 2025 | Pre-season | (Paraguay) Eduardo Ledesma | 5 December 2025 |
| Libertad | (Argentina) Pablo Guiñazú | Sacked | 1 December 2025 | Pre-season | (Paraguay) Francisco Arce | 5 December 2025 |
| Nacional | (Paraguay) Pedro Sarabia | End of contract | 1 December 2025 | Pre-season | (Paraguay) Felipe Giménez | 15 December 2025 |
| Rubio Ñu | (Paraguay) Héctor Marecos | End of contract | 11 December 2025 | Pre-season | (Paraguay) Gustavo Morínigo | 11 December 2025 |
| San Lorenzo | (Uruguay) Sergio Órteman | Sacked | 6 February 2026 | 12th | (Paraguay) Julio César Cáceres | 8 February 2026 |
| Sportivo Luqueño | (Paraguay) Lucas Barrios | Resigned | 3 March 2026 | 8th | (Paraguay) Pedro Sarabia | 3 March 2026 |
| Guaraní | (Argentina) Víctor Bernay | Sacked | 16 March 2026 | 10th | (Paraguay) Claudio Vargas (Note: Caretaker manager(s).) | 16 March 2026 |
| Cerro Porteño | (Uruguay) Jorge Bava | Sacked | 19 March 2026 | 3rd | (Paraguay) Jorge Achucarro | 19 March 2026 |
| Sportivo Luqueño | (Paraguay) Pedro Sarabia | Resigned | 22 March 2026 | 11th | (Uruguay) Hernán Rodrigo López | 23 March 2026 |
| Guaraní | (Paraguay) Claudio Vargas | End of caretaker spell | 25 March 2026 | 8th | (Argentina) Leandro Romagnoli | 26 March 2026 |
| Cerro Porteño | (Paraguay) Jorge Achucarro | End of caretaker spell | 31 March 2026 | 2nd | (Argentina) Ariel Holan | 30 March 2026 |
| Rubio Ñu | (Paraguay) Gustavo Morínigo | Resigned | 7 April 2026 | 9th | (Argentina) Miguel Pavani (Paraguay) Roberto Acuña | 8 April 2026 |
| Nacional | (Paraguay) Felipe Giménez | Sacked | 7 April 2026 | 4th | (Argentina) Víctor Bernay | 8 April 2026 |
| Rubio Ñu | (Argentina) Miguel Pavani (Paraguay) Roberto Acuña | End of caretaker spell | 14 April 2026 | 9th | (Paraguay) Felipe Giménez | 14 April 2026 |
| Libertad | (Paraguay) Francisco Arce | Resigned | 21 April 2026 | 8th | (Paraguay) Juan Samudio | 23 April 2026 |
| San Lorenzo | (Paraguay) Julio César Cáceres | Mutual agreement | 26 April 2026 | 12th | (Argentina) Mario Grana | 27 April 2026 |
| San Lorenzo | (Argentina) Mario Grana | End of caretaker spell | 4 May 2026 | 12th | (Paraguay) Troadio Duarte | 4 May 2026 |
Torneo Clausura
| Libertad | (Paraguay) Juan Samudio | Change of role | 27 May 2026 | Pre-tournament | (Paraguay) Nelson Haedo Valdez | 25 May 2026 |
| Guaraní | (Argentina) Leandro Romagnoli | Resigned | 13 July 2026 | Pre-tournament | (Paraguay) Ariel Galeano | 14 July 2026 |
| Rubio Ñu | (Paraguay) Felipe Giménez | Sacked | 8 August 2026 | 12th | (Argentina) Javier Torrente | 12 August 2026 |
| Cerro Porteño | (Argentina) Ariel Holan | Sacked | 28 August 2026 | 9th | (Argentina) Gustavo Costas | 28 August 2026 |
| San Lorenzo | (Paraguay) Troadio Duarte | Sacked | 29 August 2026 | 12th | (Argentina) Pablo Fornasari | 30 August 2026 |
| Guaraní | (Paraguay) Ariel Galeano | Sacked | 30 August 2026 | 8th | (Paraguay) Francisco Arce | 31 August 2026 |
| Sportivo Luqueño | (Uruguay) Hernán Rodrigo López | Sacked | 14 September 2026 | 9th | (Paraguay) Lucas Barrios | 15 September 2026 |
| Libertad | (Paraguay) Nelson Haedo Valdez | Sacked | 1 November 2026 | 4th | (Paraguay) Ariel Galeano | 1 November 2026 |

== Torneo Apertura ==
The Torneo Apertura was the 133rd official División de Honor championship and the first tournament of the 2026 season. It began on 23 January and ended on 24 May 2026. The champions, Olimpia, qualified for the 2027 Copa Libertadores group stage.

=== Standings ===
| Pos | Team | Pld | W | D | L | GF | GA | GD | Pts | Qualification |
|---|---|---|---|---|---|---|---|---|---|---|
| 1 | Olimpia (C) | 22 | 15 | 4 | 3 | 37 | 17 | +20 | 49 | Qualification for Copa Libertadores group stage |
| 2 | Nacional | 22 | 10 | 9 | 3 | 31 | 22 | +9 | 39 | |
| 3 | Cerro Porteño | 22 | 11 | 5 | 6 | 30 | 22 | +8 | 38 | |
| 4 | Sportivo Ameliano | 22 | 8 | 9 | 5 | 27 | 21 | +6 | 33 | |
| 5 | Sportivo Trinidense | 22 | 8 | 8 | 6 | 30 | 24 | +6 | 32 | |
| 6 | Libertad | 22 | 9 | 4 | 9 | 34 | 26 | +8 | 31 | |
| 7 | Guaraní | 22 | 7 | 8 | 7 | 27 | 23 | +4 | 29 | |
| 8 | Recoleta | 22 | 8 | 4 | 10 | 35 | 32 | +3 | 28 | |
| 9 | Rubio Ñu | 22 | 6 | 5 | 11 | 15 | 26 | −11 | 23 | |
| 10 | 2 de Mayo | 22 | 5 | 7 | 10 | 18 | 35 | −17 | 22 | |
| 11 | Sportivo Luqueño | 22 | 5 | 5 | 12 | 24 | 33 | −9 | 20 | |
| 12 | San Lorenzo | 22 | 3 | 6 | 13 | 14 | 41 | −27 | 15 | |

Source: APF, Soccerway
Rules for classification: 1) Points, 2) Head-to-head points, 3) Head-to-head goal difference, 4) Overall goal difference, 5) Goals for, 6) Playoff game (if needed to decide championship between two teams) or Drawing of lots (if three teams or more are tied).
(C) Champions

=== Results ===
| Home \ Away | 2DM | CCP | GUA | LIB | NAC | OLI | REC | RUB | SSL | SPA | SLU | TRI |
|---|---|---|---|---|---|---|---|---|---|---|---|---|
| 2 de Mayo | — | 0–0 | 2–2 | 0–2 | 1–1 | 1–1 | 0–1 | 2–0 | 0–1 | 1–2 | 1–2 | 1–0 |
| Cerro Porteño | 3–0 | — | 0–0 | 1–1 | 0–2 | 0–1 | 2–0 | 2–0 | 2–0 | 1–1 | 2–0 | 2–1 |
| Guaraní | 1–1 | 0–2 | — | 1–0 | 0–1 | 0–2 | 3–1 | 4–0 | 3–1 | 1–0 | 2–1 | 0–0 |
| Libertad | 0–0 | 2–3 | 3–3 | — | 2–1 | 3–2 | 1–0 | 0–1 | 5–0 | 1–0 | 1–0 | 1–1 |
| Nacional | 5–1 | 0–0 | 1–1 | 2–1 | — | 1–2 | 2–1 | 1–0 | 1–0 | 1–1 | 3–2 | 2–1 |
| Olimpia | 4–1 | 3–0 (Note: Match abandoned after 30 minutes of play and awarded 3–0 to Olimpia due to crowd disturbances by Cerro Porteño fans. The score at the time of suspension was 0–0.) | 2–1 | 1–0 | 3–0 | — | 3–2 | 0–0 | 1–1 | 1–1 | 1–0 | 3–2 |
| Recoleta | 5–0 | 2–1 | 2–1 | 2–1 | 2–2 | 0–1 | — | 1–0 | 4–2 | 1–1 | 1–2 | 1–1 |
| Rubio Ñu | 0–1 | 2–0 | 0–2 | 3–0 | 1–1 | 0–2 | 1–1 | — | 2–0 | 1–2 | 0–0 | 0–1 |
| San Lorenzo | 1–1 | 2–4 | 1–0 | 0–7 | 0–0 | 1–0 | 0–3 | 0–1 | — | 1–2 | 0–0 | 1–1 |
| Sportivo Ameliano | 3–0 | 0–1 | 0–0 | 2–0 | 1–1 | 0–1 | 3–2 | 2–2 | 1–0 | — | 2–2 | 1–2 |
| Sportivo Luqueño | 0–2 | 2–3 | 3–2 | 2–3 | 1–2 | 1–2 | 2–1 | 0–1 | 1–1 | 0–1 | — | 2–1 |
| Sportivo Trinidense | 1–2 | 3–1 | 0–0 | 1–0 | 1–1 | 2–1 | 3–2 | 4–0 | 2–1 | 1–1 | 1–1 | — |

Source: APF, Soccerway
Legend: Blue = home team win; Yellow = draw; Red = away team win.

=== Top scorers ===
| Rank | Player | Club | Goals |
|---|---|---|---|
| 1 | (Paraguay) Lorenzo Melgarejo | Libertad | 13 |
| 1 | (Paraguay) Allan Wlk | Recoleta | 13 |
| 3 | (Argentina) Iván Maggi | Sportivo Luqueño | 10 |
| 4 | (Paraguay) Elvio Vera | Sportivo Ameliano | 9 |
| 5 | (Paraguay) Néstor Camacho | Sportivo Trinidense | 7 |
| 5 | (Paraguay) Fernando Romero | Sportivo Trinidense | 7 |
| 5 | (Paraguay) Adrián Alcaraz | Olimpia | 7 |
| 8 | (Paraguay) Aldo González | Recoleta | 6 |
| 8 | (Paraguay) Estiven Pérez | Rubio Ñu | 6 |
| 10 | (Paraguay) Cecilio Domínguez | Cerro Porteño | 5 |
| 10 | (Argentina) Ignacio Aliseda | Cerro Porteño | 5 |
| 10 | (Argentina) Ignacio Bailone | Nacional | 5 |
| 10 | (Paraguay) Diego Acosta | 2 de Mayo | 5 |
| 10 | (Paraguay) Wilfrido Báez | Recoleta | 5 |

Source: BeSoccer

== Torneo Clausura ==
The Torneo Clausura is the 134th official División de Honor championship and the second tournament of the 2026 season. It began on 24 July and is scheduled to end on 29 November 2026. Olimpia were the champions, but they had already qualified for the 2027 Copa Libertadores group stage by winning the Apertura tournament.

=== Standings ===
| Pos | Team | Pld | W | D | L | GF | GA | GD | Pts | Qualification |
|---|---|---|---|---|---|---|---|---|---|---|
| 1 | Olimpia (C, Q) | 20 | 14 | 3 | 3 | 39 | 15 | +24 | 45 | Qualification for Copa Libertadores group stage |
| 2 | Libertad | 20 | 11 | 3 | 6 | 30 | 21 | +9 | 36 | |
| 3 | Sportivo Trinidense | 20 | 10 | 4 | 6 | 32 | 20 | +12 | 34 | |
| 4 | Nacional | 19 | 9 | 5 | 5 | 26 | 14 | +12 | 32 (Note: Head-to-head points: Nacional 4, Guaraní 1.) | |
| 5 | Guaraní | 20 | 8 | 8 | 4 | 23 | 19 | +4 | 32 | |
| 6 | 2 de Mayo | 19 | 8 | 6 | 5 | 18 | 21 | −3 | 30 | |
| 7 | Cerro Porteño | 19 | 8 | 4 | 7 | 25 | 20 | +5 | 28 | |
| 8 | Sportivo Ameliano | 20 | 5 | 7 | 8 | 20 | 28 | −8 | 22 (Note: Head-to-head points: Sportivo Ameliano 6, Sportivo Luqueño 0.) | |
| 9 | Sportivo Luqueño | 20 | 7 | 1 | 12 | 25 | 34 | −9 | 22 | |
| 10 | Recoleta | 20 | 4 | 5 | 11 | 23 | 35 | −12 | 17 (Note: Head-to-head points: Recoleta 6, Rubio Ñu 0.) | |
| 11 | Rubio Ñu | 20 | 4 | 5 | 11 | 22 | 38 | −16 | 17 | |
| 12 | San Lorenzo | 19 | 2 | 5 | 12 | 14 | 32 | −18 | 11 | |

Updated to match(es) played on 22 November 2026. Source: APF, Soccerway
Rules for classification: 1) Points, 2) Head-to-head points, 3) Head-to-head goal difference, 4) Overall goal difference, 5) Goals for, 6) Playoff game (if needed to decide championship between two teams) or Drawing of lots (if three teams or more are tied).
(C) Champions; (Q) Qualified for the phase indicated

=== Results ===
| Home \ Away | 2DM | CCP | GUA | LIB | NAC | OLI | REC | RUB | SSL | SPA | SLU | TRI |
|---|---|---|---|---|---|---|---|---|---|---|---|---|
| 2 de Mayo | — | 2–1 | 0–0 | 0–2 | | 1–0 | 1–1 | 1–0 | | 1–0 | 2–2 | 0–0 |
| Cerro Porteño | 0–2 | — | | 1–1 | 1–0 | 0–2 | 1–1 | 1–0 | 1–0 | 2–2 | 3–0 | 1–2 |
| Guaraní | 1–0 | 1–1 | — | 2–1 | 0–2 | 1–3 | 2–0 | 2–3 | 1–1 | 1–1 | 1–2 | |
| Libertad | | 0–1 | 2–2 | — | 3–0 | 0–1 | 4–1 | 4–2 | 1–0 | 1–1 | 1–0 | 2–1 |
| Nacional | 3–0 | | 0–0 | 3–0 | — | 2–0 | 1–0 | | 0–2 | 1–1 | 2–0 | 0–1 |
| Olimpia | 3–0 | 2–1 | 1–1 | 0–1 | 1–1 | — | 4–1 | 5–0 | | 2–1 | 3–0 | 2–1 |
| Recoleta | 1–2 | 1–3 | 2–2 | 1–2 | 3–2 | 1–2 | — | 1–0 | 1–1 | 3–0 | | 1–3 |
| Rubio Ñu | 2–2 | | 0–2 | 1–2 | 0–1 | 0–0 | 1–3 | — | 3–1 | 1–1 | 0–5 | 0–0 |
| San Lorenzo | 1–2 | 1–3 | 0–1 | 2–1 | 0–3 | 0–3 | 0–0 | 2–2 | — | | 0–2 | 1–1 |
| Sportivo Ameliano | 1–1 | 1–0 | 0–1 | | 1–1 | 2–3 | 3–1 | 1–2 | 1–0 | — | 1–0 | 0–3 |
| Sportivo Luqueño | 3–0 | 0–3 | 0–1 | 1–2 | 0–3 | | 1–0 | 2–1 | 3–2 | 1–2 | — | 1–4 |
| Sportivo Trinidense | 0–1 | 2–1 | 0–1 | 1–0 | 1–1 | 1–2 | | 2–4 | 3–0 | 3–0 | 3–2 | — |

Updated to match(es) played on 22 November 2026. Source: APF, Soccerway
Legend: Blue = home team win; Yellow = draw; Red = away team win.

=== Top scorers ===
As of 22 November 2026

| Rank | Player | Club | Goals |
|---|---|---|---|
| 1 | (Paraguay) Gabriel Ávalos | Olimpia | 8 |
| 1 | (Paraguay) Elvio Vera | Libertad | 8 |
| 1 | (Argentina) Pablo Vegetti | Cerro Porteño | 8 |
| 4 | (Paraguay) Aldo González | Recoleta | 7 |
| 5 | (Paraguay) Luis Abreu | Sportivo Trinidense | 6 |
| 5 | (Paraguay) Hugo Adrián Benítez | Nacional | 6 |
| 5 | (Paraguay) Iván Valdez | Nacional | 6 |
| 5 | (Argentina) Iván Maggi | Sportivo Luqueño | 6 |
| 9 | (Paraguay) Cristhian Ocampos | Sportivo Ameliano | 5 |
| 9 | (Paraguay) Marcelo Ferreira | San Lorenzo | 5 |
| 9 | (Paraguay) Romeo Benítez | Olimpia | 5 |
| 9 | (Paraguay) Clementino González | Sportivo Trinidense | 5 |
| 9 | (Paraguay) Estivel Moreira | Sportivo Ameliano | 5 |
| 9 | (Paraguay) Jorge Morel | Cerro Porteño | 5 |

Source: BeSoccer

== Aggregate table ==
The results of the Apertura and Clausura tournaments are combined into a single table to determine the distribution of the remaining Copa Libertadores and Copa Sudamericana berths. The best-placed team in this table (other than the tournament champions) will qualify for the Copa Libertadores second stage, while the next four teams that do not qualify for the Copa Libertadores will enter the Copa Sudamericana first stage.

Since Olimpia won both the Apertura and Clausura tournaments, the second Paraguayan spot in the Copa Libertadores group stage was redistributed to the next best-placed team in this table.

| Pos | Team | Pld | W | D | L | GF | GA | GD | Pts | Qualification |
|---|---|---|---|---|---|---|---|---|---|---|
| 1 | Olimpia (C, Q) | 42 | 29 | 7 | 6 | 76 | 32 | +44 | 94 | Qualification for Copa Libertadores group stage |
| 2 | Nacional (X) | 41 | 19 | 14 | 8 | 57 | 36 | +21 | 71 | Qualification for Copa Libertadores group stage |
| 3 | Libertad (X) | 42 | 20 | 7 | 15 | 64 | 47 | +17 | 67 | Qualification for Copa Libertadores second stage |
| 4 | Sportivo Trinidense (X) | 42 | 18 | 12 | 12 | 62 | 44 | +18 | 66 (Note: Head-to-head points: Sportivo Trinidense 9, Cerro Porteño 3.) | Qualification for Copa Sudamericana first stage |
| 5 | Cerro Porteño (X) | 41 | 19 | 9 | 13 | 55 | 42 | +13 | 66 | Qualification for Copa Sudamericana first stage |
| 6 | Guaraní (X) | 42 | 15 | 16 | 11 | 50 | 42 | +8 | 61 | Qualification for Copa Sudamericana first stage |
| 7 | Sportivo Ameliano | 42 | 13 | 16 | 13 | 47 | 49 | −2 | 55 | Qualification for Copa Sudamericana first stage |
| 8 | 2 de Mayo | 41 | 13 | 13 | 15 | 36 | 56 | −20 | 52 | |
| 9 | Recoleta (Q) | 42 | 12 | 9 | 21 | 58 | 67 | −9 | 45 | Qualification for Copa Libertadores first stage (Note: Recoleta qualified for the Copa Libertadores first stage as 2026 Copa Paraguay champions or runners-up since the other finalist Sol de América is ineligible to qualify for South American competition.) |
| 10 | Sportivo Luqueño | 42 | 12 | 6 | 24 | 49 | 67 | −18 | 42 | |
| 11 | Rubio Ñu | 42 | 10 | 10 | 22 | 37 | 64 | −27 | 40 | |
| 12 | San Lorenzo | 41 | 5 | 11 | 25 | 28 | 73 | −45 | 26 | |

Updated to match(es) played on 22 November 2026. Source: APF
Rules for classification: 1) Points, 2) Head-to-head points, 3) Head-to-head goal difference, 4) Overall goal difference, 5) Goals for, 6) Playoff game (if needed to decide international qualification between two teams) or Drawing of lots (if three teams or more are tied).
(C) Champions; (Q) Qualified for the phase indicated; (X) Assured of Copa Sudamericana, but may still qualify for Copa Libertadores

== Relegation ==
Relegation is determined at the end of the season by computing an average of the number of points earned per game over the past three seasons. The two teams with the lowest average will be relegated to the División Intermedia for the following season.

| Pos | Team | 2024 Pts | 2025 Pts | 2026 Pts | Total Pts | Total Pld | Avg | Relegation |
|---|---|---|---|---|---|---|---|---|
| 1 | Olimpia | 80 | 59 | 94 | 233 | 130 | 1.792 | |
| 2 | Cerro Porteño | 74 | 85 | 66 | 225 | 129 | 1.744 | |
| 3 | Libertad | 74 | 70 | 67 | 211 | 130 | 1.623 | |
| 4 | Guaraní | 66 | 83 | 61 | 210 | 130 | 1.615 | |
| 5 | Nacional | 55 | 60 | 71 | 186 | 129 | 1.442 | |
| 6 | Sportivo Trinidense | 46 | 67 | 66 | 179 | 130 | 1.377 | |
| 7 | 2 de Mayo | 65 | 51 | 52 | 168 | 129 | 1.302 | |
| 8 | Sportivo Ameliano | 56 | 48 | 55 | 159 | 130 | 1.223 | |
| 9 | Recoleta | — | 59 | 45 | 104 | 86 | 1.209 | |
| 10 | Sportivo Luqueño | 61 | 47 | 42 | 150 | 130 | 1.154 | |
| 11 | Rubio Ñu (R) | — | — | 40 | 40 | 42 | 0.952 | Relegation to División Intermedia |
| 12 | San Lorenzo (R) | — | — | 26 | 26 | 41 | 0.634 | Relegation to División Intermedia |

Updated to match(es) played on 22 November 2026. Source: APF

== See also ==
- 2026 APF División Intermedia
- 2026 Copa Paraguay
