= 2027 Sporting Cristal season =

Football league season

Sporting Cristal
2027 season
- Stadium: Alberto Gallardo, Lima
- Liga 1: Tornel Apertura: To be defined Tornel Clausura: To be defined Aggregate Table: To be defined To be defined
- Copa de la Liga: To be defined
- Copa Libertadores: To be defined
Home colours	Away colours	Third colours

The 2027 Sporting Cristal season will be the Seventy-Second (72.º) of the club from its foundation in 1955, Seventy-Two (72) participations consecutives in the top-flight of Peruvian Primera División (of 111 Editions) with denomination last Liga 1. In Previous Season the club qualified as N° Place of the 2026 Liga 1.

Sporting Cristal will be a of eighteen (18) clubs in the Nineth edition (9.º) Liga 1, the competition most important of the Peruvian football. The club will play the Peruvian Primera División and Copa Sudamericana for Sixth (6th) Time.

== Liga 1 ==
=== Torneo Apertura ===
Pos	Team	Pld	W	D	L	GF	GA	GD	Pts
1	To be defined	0	0	0	0	0	0	0	0
2	Sporting Cristal	0	0	0	0	0	0	0	0
3	To be defined	0	0	0	0	0	0	0	0

== See also ==
- Club Sporting Cristal
- 2027 Liga 1
