= Janner Corozo =

Ecuadorian footballer (born 1995)

Personal information
- Full name: Janner Hitcler Corozo Alman
- Date of birth: 8 September 1995 (age 31)
- Place of birth: Guayaquil, Ecuador
- Height: 1.75 m (5 ft 9 in)
- Position: Winger

Team information
- Current team: LDU Quito
- Number: 13

Youth career
- 2014–2015: Macará
- 2014–2015: → Atlas (loan)

Senior career*
Years	Team	Apps	(Gls)
2012	Carlos Borbor Reyes	4	(0)
2013	LDU Guayaquil	0	(0)
2014–2016	Macará	52	(7)
2016	→ El Nacional (loan)	29	(5)
2017–2019	Independiente del Valle	40	(5)
2019	→ Macará (loan)	32	(8)
2020–2022	Delfín	69	(16)
2022–2023	Pachuca	0	(0)
2022	→ Everton (loan)	6	(0)
2023	→ Barcelona S.C. (loan)	27	(4)
2024–2026	Barcelona S.C.	66	(32)
2026–	LDU Quito	23	(4)

International career^{‡}
2021–	Ecuador	7	(1)
- * Club domestic league appearances and goals as of 11 October 2026 ‡ National team caps and goals as of 23:27, 25 March 2025 (UTC)

Janner Hitcler Corozo Alman (born 8 September 1995) is an Ecuadorian footballer who plays mainly as a right winger for Ecuadorian club LDU Quito and the Ecuador national team.

== Club career ==
=== Early career ===
Born in Guayaquil, Corozo made his senior debut with CD Juvenil Carlos Borbor Reyes in the 2012 Segunda Categoría de Santa Elena, also featuring in the national competition with the side. For the 2013, he moved to hometown side LDU Guayaquil.

In February 2014, Corozo signed for Macará and was initially assigned to the under-18 side before making his first team debut during the year's Serie B. In September 2014, he moved abroad after joining the under-20 team of Mexican side Atlas, on loan.

Upon returning to Macará in January 2015, Corozo became a regular starter in the main squad, scoring five goals in 33 appearances. He moved on loan to Serie A side El Nacional in January 2016, and made his top tier debut on 7 February of that year by coming on as a second-half substitute in a 2–1 home win over Barcelona SC.

Corozo scored his first goal in the top tier of Ecuadorian football on 17 July 2016, netting the equalizer in a 3–3 home draw against Deportivo Cuenca.

=== Independiente del Valle ===
On 1 January 2017, Corozo signed for Independiente del Valle, also in the top tier. In July, however, he suffered a knee injury which kept him out for the remainder of the season.

After being mainly used as a substitute during the 2018 campaign, Corozo returned to previous club Macará on 20 December 2018, on a one-year loan deal.

=== Delfín ===
On 2 January 2020, Delfín announced the signing of Corozo. He immediately became a starter for his new side, being subsequently linked to Emelec, LDU Quito and Barcelona in 2021.

=== Pachuca ===
In 2022, Corozo joined Pachuca and was immediately loaned to Everton de Viña del Mar in the Chilean Primera División.

== International career ==
On 23 October 2021, Corozo was called up to the Ecuador national team by manager Gustavo Alfaro for a friendly against Mexico. He made his full international debut four days later, starting and scoring his side's second in the 3–2 win at the Bank of America Stadium in Charlotte, North Carolina.

== Career statistics ==
=== Club ===
As of 1 April 2022

Club	Season	League			Cup		Continental		Other		Total	
Club	Season	Division	Apps	Goals	Apps	Goals	Apps	Goals	Apps	Goals	Apps	Goals
Carlos Borbor Reyes	2012	Segunda Categoría	4	0	—		—		2 (Note: Appearance(s) in Campeonato Provincial de Segunda Categoría de Santa Elena)	0	6	0
LDU Guayaquil	2013	Segunda Categoría del Guayas	—		—		—		6 (Note: Appearance(s) in Campeonato Provincial de Segunda Categoría del Guayas)	1	6	1
Macará	2014	Ecuadorian Serie B	19	2	—		—		—		19	2
Macará	2015	Ecuadorian Serie B	33	5	—		—		—		33	5
Macará	Total		52	7	—		—		—		52	7
El Nacional	2016	Ecuadorian Serie A	29	5	—		—		—		24	1
Independiente del Valle	2017	Ecuadorian Serie A	14	2	—		4 (Note: Appearance(s) in Copa Libertadores)	0	—		18	2
Independiente del Valle	2018	Ecuadorian Serie A	26	3	—		0	0	—		26	3
Independiente del Valle	Total		40	5	—		4	0	—		44	5
Macará	2019	Ecuadorian Serie A	32	8	—		3 (Note: Appearance(s) in Copa Sudamericana)	0	—		35	8
Delfín	2020	Ecuadorian Serie A	25	5	—		8	1	1 (Note: Appearance(s) in Supercopa Ecuador)	0	34	6
Delfín	2021	Ecuadorian Serie A	29	7	—		—		2	1	31	8
Delfín	2022	Ecuadorian Serie A	5	1	—		2	0	—		7	0
Delfín	Total		59	13	—		10	1	3	1	72	15
Career total			216	38	0	0	17	1	11	2	244	41

=== International ===
As of 25 March 2025

Ecuador
Year	Apps	Goals
2021	3	1
2024	2	0
2025	2	0
Total	7	1

List of international goals scored by Janner Corozo
No.	Date	Venue	Opponent	Score	Result	Competition
1	27 October 2021	Bank of America Stadium, Charlotte, United States	Mexico	2–1	3–2	Friendly
