= Mariano Echeverría (footballer, born 1977) =

Argentine football manager

Personal information
- Date of birth: 3 March 1977 (age 49)
- Place of birth: Argentina

Team information
- Current team: Trujillanos (manager)

Managerial career
- Years: Team
- 2013–2015: San Lorenzo (youth)
- 2021: Zamora (assistant)
- 2024: Huracán (youth)
- 2025: Central Norte (assistant)
- 2026: Racing de Córdoba (assistant)
- 2026: Trujillanos (assistant)
- 2026–: Trujillanos

Mariano Echeverría (born 3 March 1977) is an Argentine football manager, currently in charge of Venezuelan club Trujillanos.

== Career ==
After a playing career in his native Argentina and Sweden and Vietnam, Echeverría worked in the youth sides of San Lorenzo and was a scout for French side FC Metz before starting a partnership with Marcelo Gómez and becoming his assistant in the reserve sides of Vélez Sarsfield and Independiente. In January 2021, the duo moved to Venezuela after Gómez was appointed in charge of Zamora.

In 2022, Echeverría was in charge of Lanús' under-16 team, before becoming an assistant of Claudio Cabrera at Huracán's reserve side in March 2023. He took over the latter club's under-17 squad for the 2024 season, before becoming Pablo Fornasari's assistant at Central Norte in May 2025.

Echeverría followed Fornasari to Racing de Córdoba in November 2025, again as his assistant, before moving to Venezuela in May 2026, as an assistant of Trujillanos. On 14 July of that year, he was appointed manager of the side after Pedro Vera became a sporting director.
