= 2027 Copa Sudamericana =

26th Copa Sudamericana edition

Copa CONMEBOL Sudamericana 2027
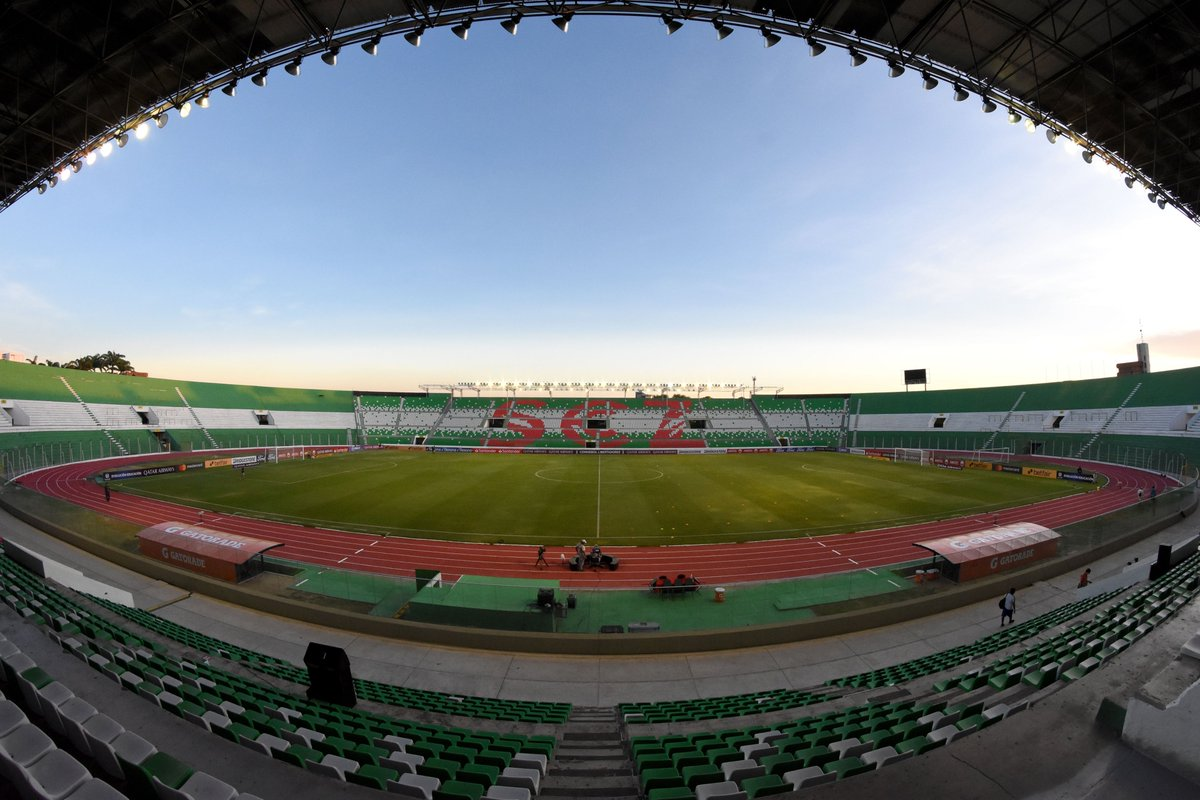
- Estadio Ramón Tahuichi Aguilera in Santa Cruz de la Sierra will host the final

Tournament details
- Dates: 2 March – 20 November 2027
- Teams: 44+12 (from 10 associations)

The 2026 Copa CONMEBOL Sudamericana will be the 26th edition of the CONMEBOL Sudamericana (also referred to as the Copa Sudamericana), South America's secondary club football tournament organized by CONMEBOL. The competition will begin on 2 March and is scheduled to end on 20 November 2027, with the final match to be played at Estadio Ramón Tahuichi Aguilera in Santa Cruz de la Sierra, Bolivia.

The winners of the 2027 Copa Sudamericana will earn the right to play against the winners of the 2027 Copa Libertadores in the 2028 Recopa Sudamericana. They will also automatically qualify for the 2028 Copa Libertadores group stage.

Argentine club Boca Juniors are the titleholders, but since they qualified for the 2027 Copa Libertadores group stage as Copa Sudamericana champions, they will only be able to defend their title if they place third in their Copa Libertadores group.

Starting from this season, the competition will feature a format change in its first stage played between teams from the same association, which will revert to being played on a home-and-away two-legged basis after being held over a single match since 2023.

== Teams ==
The following 44 teams from the 10 CONMEBOL associations will qualify for the tournament:

- Argentina and Brazil: 6 berths each
- All other associations: 4 berths each

The entry stage is determined as follows:

- Group stage: 12 teams (teams from Argentina and Brazil)
- First stage: 32 teams (teams from all other associations)

Association	Team (Berth)	Entry stage	Qualification method
Argentina (6 berths)	(Argentina 1)	Group stage	2026 Liga Profesional aggregate table best team not qualified for 2027 Copa Libertadores
Argentina (6 berths)	(Argentina 2)	Group stage	2026 Liga Profesional aggregate table 2nd best team not qualified for 2027 Copa Libertadores
Argentina (6 berths)	(Argentina 3)	Group stage	2026 Liga Profesional aggregate table 3rd best team not qualified for 2027 Copa Libertadores
Argentina (6 berths)	(Argentina 4)	Group stage	2026 Liga Profesional aggregate table 4th best team not qualified for 2027 Copa Libertadores
Argentina (6 berths)	(Argentina 5)	Group stage	2026 Liga Profesional aggregate table 5th best team not qualified for 2027 Copa Libertadores
Argentina (6 berths)	(Argentina 6)	Group stage	2026 Liga Profesional aggregate table 6th best team not qualified for 2027 Copa Libertadores
Bolivia (4 berths)	(Bolivia 1)	First stage	2026 Copa Bolivia runners-up
Bolivia (4 berths)	(Bolivia 2)	First stage	2026 División Profesional best team not qualified for 2027 Copa Libertadores
Bolivia (4 berths)	(Bolivia 3)	First stage	2026 División Profesional 2nd best team not qualified for 2027 Copa Libertadores
Bolivia (4 berths)	(Bolivia 4)	First stage	2026 División Profesional 3rd best team not qualified for 2027 Copa Libertadores
Brazil (6 berths)	(Brazil 1)	Group stage	2026 Campeonato Brasileiro Série A best team not qualified for 2027 Copa Libertadores
Brazil (6 berths)	(Brazil 2)	Group stage	2026 Campeonato Brasileiro Série A 2nd best team not qualified for 2027 Copa Libertadores
Brazil (6 berths)	(Brazil 3)	Group stage	2026 Campeonato Brasileiro Série A 3rd best team not qualified for 2027 Copa Libertadores
Brazil (6 berths)	(Brazil 4)	Group stage	2026 Campeonato Brasileiro Série A 4th best team not qualified for 2027 Copa Libertadores
Brazil (6 berths)	(Brazil 5)	Group stage	2026 Campeonato Brasileiro Série A 5th best team not qualified for 2027 Copa Libertadores
Brazil (6 berths)	(Brazil 6)	Group stage	2026 Campeonato Brasileiro Série A 6th best team not qualified for 2027 Copa Libertadores
Chile (4 berths)	(Chile 1)	First stage	2026 Liga de Primera 4th place
Chile (4 berths)	(Chile 2)	First stage	2026 Liga de Primera 5th place
Chile (4 berths)	(Chile 3)	First stage	2026 Liga de Primera 6th place
Chile (4 berths)	(Chile 4)	First stage	2026 Copa Libertadores play-off losers
Colombia (4 berths)	(Colombia 1)	First stage	2026 Copa Colombia champions
Colombia (4 berths)	(Colombia 2)	First stage	2026 Liga DIMAYOR aggregate table best team not qualified for 2027 Copa Libertadores
Colombia (4 berths)	(Colombia 3)	First stage	2026 Liga DIMAYOR aggregate table 2nd best team not qualified for 2027 Copa Libertadores
Colombia (4 berths)	(Colombia 4)	First stage	2026 Liga DIMAYOR aggregate table 3rd best team not qualified for 2027 Copa Libertadores
Ecuador (4 berths)	(Ecuador 1)	First stage	2026 Serie A best team not qualified for 2027 Copa Libertadores
Ecuador (4 berths)	(Ecuador 2)	First stage	2026 Serie A 2nd best team not qualified for 2027 Copa Libertadores
Ecuador (4 berths)	Libertad (Ecuador 3)	First stage	2026 Serie A Copa Sudamericana group winners
Ecuador (4 berths)	Guayaquil City (Ecuador 4)	First stage	2026 Serie A Copa Sudamericana group runners-up
Paraguay (4 berths)	(Paraguay 1)	First stage	2026 Copa de Primera aggregate table best team not qualified for 2027 Copa Libertadores
Paraguay (4 berths)	(Paraguay 2)	First stage	2026 Copa de Primera aggregate table 2nd best team not qualified for 2027 Copa Libertadores
Paraguay (4 berths)	(Paraguay 3)	First stage	2026 Copa de Primera aggregate table 3rd best team not qualified for 2027 Copa Libertadores
Paraguay (4 berths)	(Paraguay 4)	First stage	2026 Copa de Primera aggregate table 4th best team not qualified for 2027 Copa Libertadores
Peru (4 berths)	Deportivo Garcilaso (Peru 1)	First stage	2026 Liga 1 aggregate table best team not qualified for 2027 Copa Libertadores
Peru (4 berths)	Sporting Cristal (Peru 2)	First stage	2026 Liga 1 aggregate table 2nd best team not qualified for 2027 Copa Libertadores
Peru (4 berths)	Cusco (Peru 3)	First stage	2026 Liga 1 aggregate table 3rd best team not qualified for 2027 Copa Libertadores
Peru (4 berths)	Cienciano (Peru 4)	First stage	2026 Liga 1 aggregate table 4th best team not qualified for 2027 Copa Libertadores
Uruguay (4 berths)	(Uruguay 1)	First stage	2026 Apertura or 2026 Clausura winners (if not qualified for 2027 Copa Libertadores)
Uruguay (4 berths)	(Uruguay 2)	First stage	2026 Liga AUF Uruguaya aggregate table best team not qualified for 2027 Copa Libertadores
Uruguay (4 berths)	(Uruguay 3)	First stage	2026 Liga AUF Uruguaya aggregate table 2nd best team not qualified for 2027 Copa Libertadores
Uruguay (4 berths)	(Uruguay 4)	First stage	2026 Liga AUF Uruguaya aggregate table 3rd best team not qualified for 2027 Copa Libertadores
Venezuela (4 berths)	Academia Puerto Cabello (Venezuela 1)	First stage	2026 Apertura runners-up
Venezuela (4 berths)	Portuguesa (Venezuela 2)	First stage	2026 Liga FUTVE aggregate table 2nd best team not qualified for 2027 Copa Libertadores
Venezuela (4 berths)	Universidad Central (Venezuela 3)	First stage	2026 Liga FUTVE aggregate table 3rd best team not qualified for 2027 Copa Libertadores
Venezuela (4 berths)	Estudiantes de Mérida (Venezuela 4)	First stage	2026 Liga FUTVE aggregate table 4th best team not qualified for 2027 Copa Libertadores

Notes

1. Argentina (ARG): Lanús (2026 Liga Profesional aggregate table 9th place) has qualified for either the Argentina 4 or the Argentina 5 berth.
2. Uruguay (URU): Montevideo Wanderers (2026 Liga AUF Uruguaya aggregate table 7th place) has qualified for either the Uruguay 3 or the Uruguay 4 berth.

A further 12 teams eliminated from the 2027 Copa Libertadores will be transferred to the Copa Sudamericana, entering the group stage and the knockout round play-offs.

Teams eliminated in third stage	Entry stage
	Group stage
Third-placed teams in group stage	Entry stage
	Knockout round play-offs

== Schedule ==
The schedule of the competition will be as follows:

Schedule for 2027 Copa Sudamericana
Stage	Draw date	First leg	Second leg
First stage	TBD	2–4 March 2027	9–11 March 2027
Group stage	17 March 2027	Matchday 1: 6–8 April 2027; Matchday 2: 13–15 April 2027; Matchday 3: 27–29 April 2027; Matchday 4: 4–6 May 2027; Matchday 5: 18–20 May 2027; Matchday 6: 25–27 May 2027	
Knockout round play-offs	No draw	20–22 July 2027	27–29 July 2027
Round of 16	2 June 2027	10–12 August 2027	17–19 August 2027
Quarter-finals	2 June 2027	7–9 September 2027	14–16 September 2027
Semi-finals	2 June 2027	12–14 October 2027	19–21 October 2027
Final	2 June 2027	20 November 2027 at Estadio Ramón Tahuichi Aguilera, Santa Cruz de la Sierra	

== See also ==
- 2027 Copa Libertadores
