= Luis Cangá =

Ecuadorian footballer (born 1995)

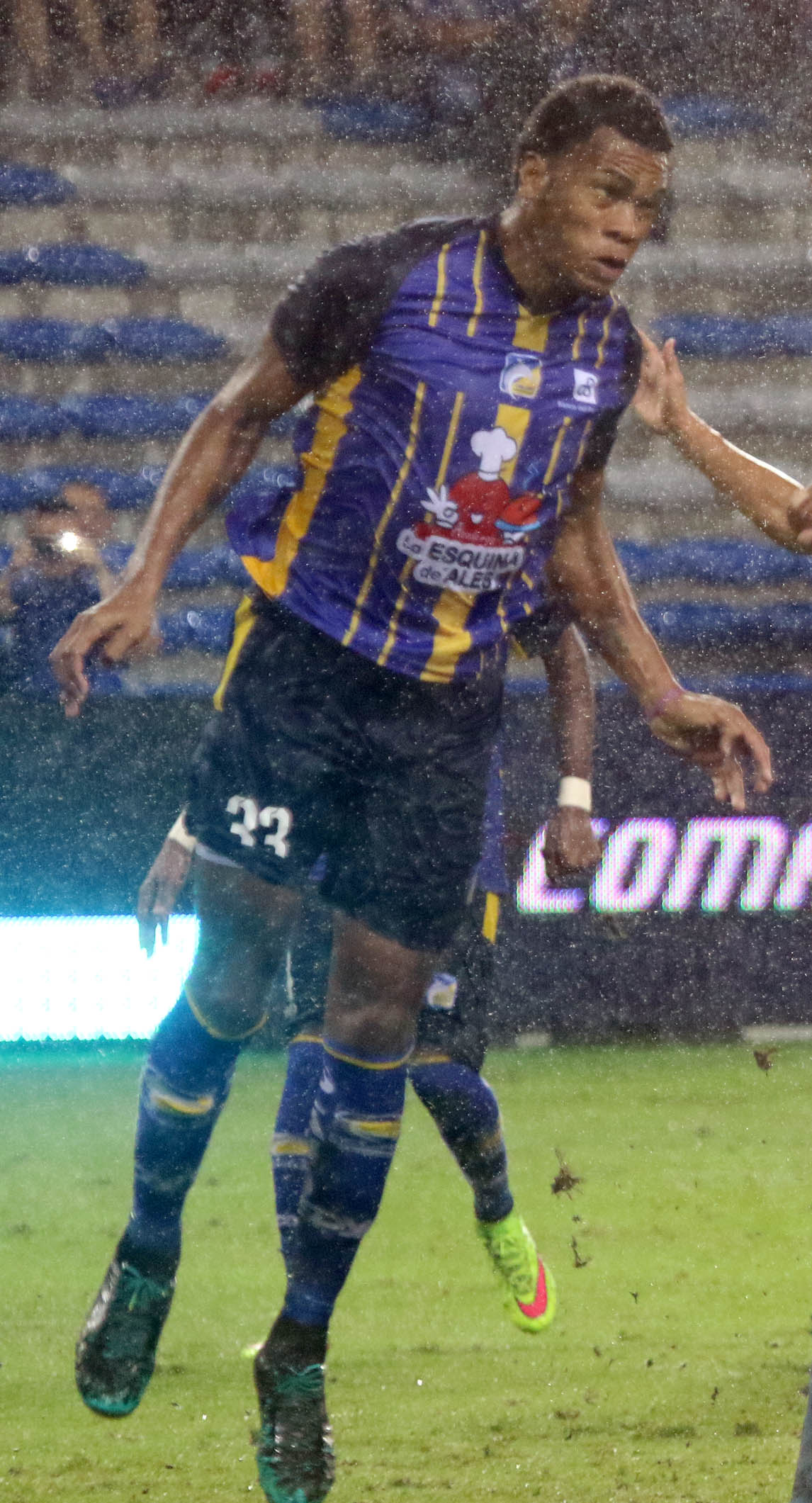
- Cangá playing for Delfín in 2018

Personal information
- Full name: Luis David Cangá Sánchez
- Date of birth: 15 June 1995 (age 31)
- Place of birth: Guayaquil, Ecuador
- Height: 1.90 m (6 ft 3 in)

Team information
- Current team: Universidad Católica
- Number: 33

Youth career
- 2009–2013: LDU Quito

Senior career*
Years	Team	Apps	(Gls)
2014–2017	LDU Quito	68	(5)
2018–2021	Delfín	122	(4)
2022	Vasco da Gama	3	(0)
2022–2024	Aucas	49	(3)
2024	Perth Glory	8	(0)
2025–	Universidad Católica	22	(2)

International career^{‡}
2011	Ecuador U17	1	(0)
2014–2015	Ecuador U20	8	(1)
2014	Ecuador	3	(0)
- * Club domestic league appearances and goals as of 20 August 2025 ‡ National team caps and goals as of 10 March 2014

Luis David Cangá Sánchez (born 18 June 1995) is an Ecuadorian footballer who plays as a central defender for Universidad Católica. Cangá has played the majority of his career in the Ecuadorian Serie A, appearing for LDU Quito, Delfín and Aucas. He also had a brief stint in Brazilian football where he turned out for Vasco da Gama in the Campeonato Carioca, and Cangá also made 8 appearances for Australian A-League club Perth Glory. Cangá has appeared at national team level for Ecuador at underage and full international level.

== Club career ==
Born in Guayaquil, Cangá joined LDU Quito's youth setup in June 2009, just days shy of his 14th birthday. Promoted to the main squad for the 2014 season, he made his first team debut on 25 January of that year, starting in a 0–1 Serie A away loss against Manta.

Cangá was a regular starter in his first senior campaign, and scored his first goal on 19 November 2014 by netting the opener in a 2–1 away win over Deportivo Cuenca. After a change in the club's tactics, he subsequently became a backup option, and was demoted to the reserve team in August 2017 due to indiscipline problems.

=== Delfín ===
On 22 December 2017, Cangá signed a three-year contract with fellow top-tier side Delfín. An immediate first-choice, he scored his first goal for the club on 2 March 2019, in a 4–2 home success over Aucas.

=== Vasco da Gama ===
In 2022, Cangá signed a three-month contract with CR Vasco da Gama. He was released by the club after playing three times in the Campeonato Carioca.

=== Aucas ===
After returning to Ecuador, he signed for Aucas in June 2022. Cangá left Aucas in June 2024.

=== Perth Glory ===
Cangá joined Australian team Perth Glory in September 2024. On 18 December 2024, Cangá was released from the club by mutual consent.

== International career ==
Cangá represented Ecuador at under-17 and under-20 levels, playing in the 2011 FIFA U-17 World Cup with the former and the 2015 South American Youth Football Championship with the latter. On 27 August 2014, he was called up to the full side by manager Sixto Vizuete for two friendlies against Bolivia and Brazil, after Jorge Guagua was injured.

Cangá made his full international debut on 6 September 2014, starting in a 4–0 win over Bolivia at the Lockhart Stadium in Fort Lauderdale, Florida.

== Career statistics ==
=== Club ===
As of 18 December 2024

Club	Season	League			Cup		Continental		Other		Total	
Club	Season	Division	Apps	Goals	Apps	Goals	Apps	Goals	Apps	Goals	Apps	Goals
LDU Quito	2014	Ecuadorian Serie A	31	2	—		—		—		31	2
LDU Quito	2015	Ecuadorian Serie A	7	0	—		4 (Note: Appearance(s) in Copa Sudamericana)	0	—		11	0
LDU Quito	2016	Ecuadorian Serie A	16	1	—		2 (Note: Appearance(s) in Copa Libertadores)	0	—		18	1
LDU Quito	2017	Ecuadorian Serie A	14	1	—		3	1	—		17	2
LDU Quito	Total		68	4	—		7	1	—		75	5
Delfín	2018	Ecuadorian Serie A	32	0	—		4	0	—		36	0
Delfín	2019	Ecuadorian Serie A	26	1	—		4	0	—		30	1
Delfín	2020	Ecuadorian Serie A	24	1	—		7	0	1 (Note: Appearance(s) in Supercopa Ecuador)	0	32	1
Delfín	2021	Ecuadorian Serie A	27	2	—		—		2	0	29	2
Delfín	Total		109	4	—		15	0	3	0	127	4
CR Vasco da Gama	2022	Campeonato Brasileiro Série B	0	0	0	0	—		3 (Note: Appearance(s) in Campeonato Carioca)	0	3	0
S.D. Aucas	2022	Ecuadorian Serie A	15	2	—		—		—		15	2
S.D. Aucas	2023	Ecuadorian Serie A	26	1	—		5	1	1	0	32	2
S.D. Aucas	2024	Ecuadorian Serie A	8	0	—		2	0	0	0	10	0
S.D. Aucas	Total		49	3	—		7	1	1	0	57	4
Perth Glory	2024–25	A-League Men	8	0	0	0	0	0	0	0	8	0
Career total			234	11	0	0	29	2	7	0	270	13

=== International ===
As of 1 December 2021

Appearances and goals by national team and year
National team	Year	Apps	Goals
Ecuador	2014	3	0
Total		3	0
