= Mariano Rodríguez (football manager) =

Venezuelan football manager (born 1980)

Personal information
- Date of birth: 23 August 1990 (age 36)
- Place of birth: Táchira, Venezuela

Team information
- Current team: Deportivo La Guaira (manager)

Managerial career
- Years: Team
- 2014–2015: Centro Italo Venezolano (youth)
- 2016: Carabobo (youth)
- 2017–2018: Mineros (assistant)
- 2019–2021: Deportivo Táchira (assistant)
- 2022: Deportes Antofagasta (assistant)
- 2022: Academia Puerto Cabello (assistant)
- 2023: Carabobo (assistant)
- 2024–2025: Deportivo La Guaira (assistant)
- 2026: Venezuela U20 (assistant)
- 2026–: Deportivo La Guaira

Mariano Rodríguez (born 23 August 1990) is a Venezuelan football manager, currently in charge of Deportivo La Guaira.

== Managerial career ==
Born in Táchira, Rodríguez worked in the youth categories of Centro Italo Venezolano and Carabobo before moving to Mineros in 2017, where he met Juan Domingo Tolisano and became his assistant. He continued working in this role in the following years, at Deportivo Táchira, Deportes Antofagasta, Academia Puerto Cabello, Carabobo and Deportivo La Guaira.

In January 2026, Rodríguez joined the staff of the Venezuela national under-20 team, also as Tolisano's assistant. On 1 October, he returned to La Guaira, now as first team manager.

== Managerial statistics ==
As of match played 26 October 2026

Managerial record by team and tenure
Team	Nat.	From	To	Record								Ref.
Team	Nat.	From	To	G	W	D	L	GF	GA	GD	Win %	Ref.
Deportivo La Guaira	(Venezuela)	2 October 2026	Present	3	0	2	1	3	4	−1	0.00	
Career Total				3	0	2	1	3	4	−1	0.00	
