= Jonathan Ramis =

Uruguayan footballer (born 1989)

Personal information
- Full name: Jonathan Raphael Ramis Persincula
- Date of birth: November 6, 1989 (age 37)
- Place of birth: Artigas, Uruguay
- Height: 1.78 m (5 ft 10 in)
- Position: Winger

Team information
- Current team: Atenas
- Number: 11

Youth career
- Peñarol

Senior career*
Years	Team	Apps	(Gls)
2008–2015	Peñarol	28	(8)
2010	→ Cádiz (loan)	12	(1)
2011	→ Nanchang Hengyuan (loan)	7	(1)
2011	→ Bella Vista (loan)	11	(0)
2012	→ Fénix (loan)	9	(1)
2012–2013	→ Aldosivi (loan)	34	(5)
2013–2014	→ Godoy Cruz (loan)	18	(3)
2014	→ LDU Quito (loan)	17	(5)
2015–2018	UNAM	12	(0)
2015	→ Racing de Montevideo (loan)	10	(3)
2016–2017	→ Zacatepec (loan)	46	(15)
2017–2018	→ Belgrano (loan)	20	(1)
2018–2021	Vélez Sarsfield	13	(1)
2019–2020	→ Tigre (loan)	11	(0)
2021	Progreso	16	(0)
2022	Cerro Largo	5	(0)
2023	Atenas	5	(0)
2024-	La Luz	9	(4)
- * Club domestic league appearances and goals as of 20:10, 26 July 2023 (UTC)

Jonathan Ramis (Spanish pronunciation: [ˈɟʝonatan ˈramis]; born 6 November 1989) is a Uruguayan footballer who plays for Atenas.

== Club careers ==
Ramis began his career in 2008 with Peñarol. He was loaned to Cádiz on a half year loan deal in January 2010.

Ramis moved to Chinese Super League side Nanchang Hengyuan on a one-year loan deal in January 2011.

In July 2010, Ramis moved to the second division to play for Aldosivi.

In December 2015, it was announced that Ramis would join Ascenso MX team, Zacatepec on loan, after being on loan at Racing de Montevideo.
