= Iván Maggi =

Argentine footballer

Personal information
- Full name: Iván Gabriel Maggi
- Date of birth: 14 June 1999 (age 27)
- Place of birth: Lanús, Argentina
- Height: 1.78 m (5 ft 10 in)
- Position: Forward

Team information
- Current team: Nueva Chicago (on loan from Racing Club)

Youth career
- 2012–2019: Racing Club

Senior career*
Years	Team	Apps	(Gls)
2019–	Racing Club	9	(1)
2022	→ San Martín T. (loan)	16	(2)
2023	→ Güemes (loan)	32	(7)
2024–	→ Nueva Chicago (loan)	57	(11)
- * Club domestic league appearances and goals as of 16:33, 20 June 2025 (UTC)

Iván Gabriel Maggi (born 14 June 1999) is an Argentine professional footballer who plays as a forward for Nueva Chicago, on loan from Racing Club.

== Professional career ==
Maggi joined the youth academy of Racing Club in 2012, and signed his first professional contract with them on 17 October 2020. Maggi made his professional debut with Racing Club in a 1-1 Argentine Primera División tie with Defensa y Justicia on 29 November 2019. In January 2022, Maggi joined Primera Nacional club San Martín de Tucumán on a one-year loan deal.
