= Luis Congo =

Ecuadorian footballer (born 1989)

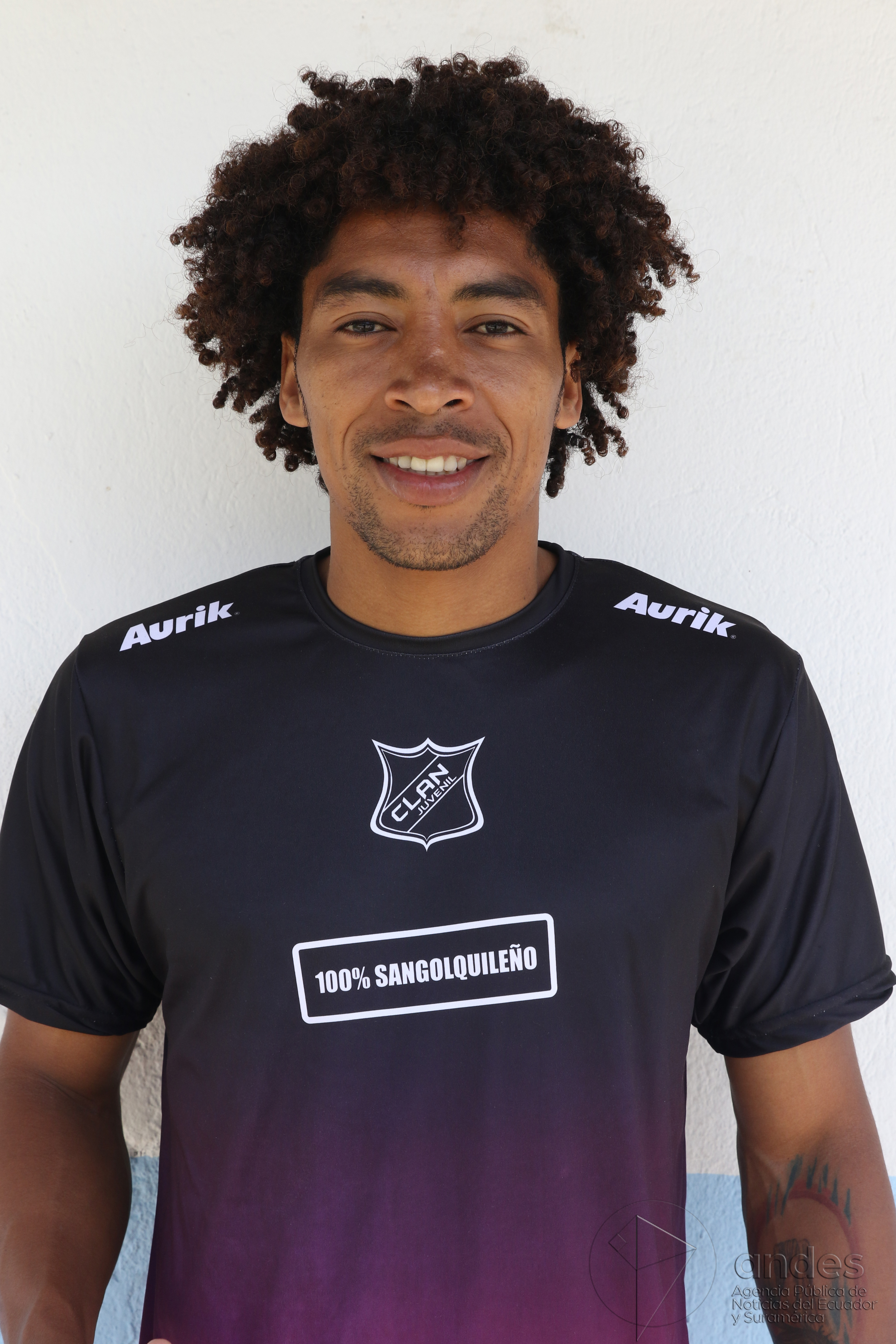

Personal information
- Full name: Luis Gonzalo Congo Minda
- Date of birth: February 27, 1989 (age 37)
- Place of birth: Mira Canton, Ecuador
- Height: 1.79 m (5 ft 10 1/2 in)
- Position: Forward

Team information
- Current team: Técnico Universitario

Youth career
- 2007–2009: Imbabura

Senior career*
Years	Team	Apps	(Gls)
2008–2011	Imbabura	113	(31)
2012–2013	Deportivo Quito	57	(12)
2014–2016	L.D.U. Quito	57	(9)
2016	Deportivo Cuenca	9	(0)
2017–2018	Clan Juvenil	21	(4)
2018	Delfín	17	(2)
2019	América de Quito	14	(2)
2019–2020	El Nacional	12	(4)
2021–	Técnico Universitario	0	(0)

International career
2011	Ecuador U23	3	(1)
- * Club domestic league appearances and goals as of 19:52, 7 December 2019 (UTC)

Luis Gonzalo Congo Minda (born 27 February 1989) is an Ecuadorian footballer who plays for Técnico Universitario as a forward.

== Club career ==
Congo finished his formation at Imbabura, making his senior debuts in 2008 season. In 2010, he scored 17 goals, and achieved team promotion. In his first season in the first division, Congo scored 9 times, with his club being relegated again.

In December 2011, Congo signed with Deportivo Quito. He made his debut on 11 February 2012, against Manta.
