= 2027 Copa Libertadores =

68th Copa Libertadores edition

Copa CONMEBOL Libertadores 2027

Tournament details
- Dates: 2 February – 27 November 2027
- Teams: 47 (from 10 associations)

The 2027 Copa CONMEBOL Libertadores will be the 68th edition of the CONMEBOL Libertadores (also referred to as the Copa Libertadores), South America's premier club football tournament organized by CONMEBOL. The competition will begin on 2 February and is scheduled to end on 27 November 2027.

The winners of the 2027 Copa Libertadores will earn the right to play against the winners of the 2027 Copa Sudamericana in the 2028 Recopa Sudamericana. They will also automatically qualify for the 2027 FIFA Intercontinental Cup, the 2029 FIFA Club World Cup and the 2028 Copa Libertadores group stage.

== Teams ==
The following 47 teams from the 10 CONMEBOL member associations will qualify for the tournament:

- Copa Libertadores champions
- Copa Sudamericana champions
- Brazil: 7 berths
- Argentina: 6 berths
- All other associations: 4 berths each

The entry stage is determined as follows:

- Group stage: 28 teams
  - Copa Libertadores champions
  - Copa Sudamericana champions
  - Teams which qualified for berths 1–5 from Argentina and Brazil
  - Teams which qualified for berths 1–2 from all other associations
- Second stage: 13 teams
  - Teams which qualified for berths 6–7 from Brazil
  - Team which qualified for berth 6 from Argentina
  - Teams which qualified for berths 3–4 from Chile and Colombia
  - Teams which qualified for berth 3 from all other associations
- First stage: 6 teams
  - Teams which qualified for berth 4 from Bolivia, Ecuador, Paraguay, Peru, Uruguay and Venezuela

Association	Team (Berth)	Entry stage	Qualification method
TBD (1 berth)	(Title holders)	Group stage	2026 Copa Libertadores champions
Argentina (6 + 1 berths)	Boca Juniors (Copa Sudamericana)	Group stage	2026 Copa Sudamericana champions
Argentina (6 + 1 berths)	Belgrano (Argentina 1)	Group stage	2026 Apertura champions
Argentina (6 + 1 berths)	(Argentina 2)	Group stage	2026 Clausura champions
Argentina (6 + 1 berths)	Platense (Argentina 3)	Group stage	2026 Copa Argentina champions or runners-up
Argentina (6 + 1 berths)	(Argentina 4)	Group stage	2026 Liga Profesional aggregate table best team not yet qualified
Argentina (6 + 1 berths)	(Argentina 5)	Group stage	2026 Liga Profesional aggregate table 2nd best team not yet qualified
Argentina (6 + 1 berths)	(Argentina 6)	Second stage	2026 Liga Profesional aggregate table 3rd best team not yet qualified
Bolivia (4 berths)	(Bolivia 1)	Group stage	2026 División Profesional champions
Bolivia (4 berths)	(Bolivia 2)	Group stage	2026 División Profesional runners-up
Bolivia (4 berths)	(Bolivia 3)	Second stage	2026 Copa Bolivia champions
Bolivia (4 berths)	(Bolivia 4)	First stage	2026 División Profesional best team not yet qualified
Brazil (7 berths)	Flamengo (Brazil 1)	Group stage	2026 Campeonato Brasileiro Série A champions
Brazil (7 berths)	Palmeiras (Brazil 2)	Group stage	2026 Campeonato Brasileiro Série A runners-up
Brazil (7 berths)	(Brazil 3)	Group stage	2026 Campeonato Brasileiro Série A 3rd place
Brazil (7 berths)	(Brazil 4)	Group stage	2026 Campeonato Brasileiro Série A 4th place
Brazil (7 berths)	(Brazil 5)	Group stage	2026 Copa do Brasil champions or runners-up
Brazil (7 berths)	(Brazil 6)	Second stage	2026 Campeonato Brasileiro Série A 5th place
Brazil (7 berths)	(Brazil 7)	Second stage	2026 Campeonato Brasileiro Série A 6th place
Chile (4 berths)	Colo-Colo (Chile 1)	Group stage	2026 Liga de Primera champions
Chile (4 berths)	(Chile 2)	Group stage	2026 Liga de Primera runners-up
Chile (4 berths)	Coquimbo Unido (Chile 3)	Second stage	2026 Copa de la Liga champions
Chile (4 berths)	(Chile 4)	Second stage	2026 Copa Libertadores play-off winners
Colombia (4 berths)	Junior (Colombia 1)	Group stage	2026 Apertura champions
Colombia (4 berths)	(Colombia 2)	Group stage	2026 Finalización champions
Colombia (4 berths)	(Colombia 3)	Second stage	2026 Liga DIMAYOR aggregate table best team not yet qualified
Colombia (4 berths)	(Colombia 4)	Second stage	2026 Liga DIMAYOR aggregate table 2nd best team not yet qualified
Ecuador (4 berths)	Independiente del Valle (Ecuador 1)	Group stage	2026 Serie A champions
Ecuador (4 berths)	Macará (Ecuador 2)	Group stage	2026 Serie A runners-up
Ecuador (4 berths)	(Ecuador 3)	Second stage	2026 Serie A 3rd place
Ecuador (4 berths)	Universidad Católica (Ecuador 4)	First stage	2026 Copa Ecuador champions or runners-up
Paraguay (4 berths)	Olimpia (Paraguay 1)	Group stage	2026 Apertura and 2026 Clausura champions
Paraguay (4 berths)	(Paraguay 2)	Group stage	2026 Copa de Primera aggregate table best team not yet qualified
Paraguay (4 berths)	(Paraguay 3)	Second stage	2026 Copa de Primera aggregate table 2nd best team not yet qualified
Paraguay (4 berths)	Recoleta (Paraguay 4)	First stage	2026 Copa Paraguay champions or runners-up
Peru (4 berths)	(Peru 1)	Group stage	2026 Liga 1 champions
Peru (4 berths)	(Peru 2)	Group stage	2026 Liga 1 runners-up
Peru (4 berths)	(Peru 3)	Second stage	2026 Liga 1 3rd place
Peru (4 berths)	Melgar (Peru 4)	First stage	2026 Liga 1 aggregate table best team not yet qualified
Uruguay (4 berths)	(Uruguay 1)	Group stage	2026 Liga AUF Uruguaya champions
Uruguay (4 berths)	(Uruguay 2)	Group stage	2026 Liga AUF Uruguaya runners-up
Uruguay (4 berths)	Montevideo City Torque (Uruguay 3)	Second stage	2026 Liga AUF Uruguaya aggregate table best team not yet qualified
Uruguay (4 berths)	(Uruguay 4)	First stage	2026 Copa Uruguay champions
Venezuela (4 berths)	(Venezuela 1)	Group stage	2026 Liga FUTVE champions
Venezuela (4 berths)	Metropolitanos (Venezuela 2)	Group stage	2026 Liga FUTVE aggregate table 1st place
Venezuela (4 berths)	(Venezuela 3)	Second stage	2026 Liga FUTVE runners-up
Venezuela (4 berths)	Deportivo La Guaira (Venezuela 4)	First stage	2026 Liga FUTVE aggregate table best team not yet qualified

Notes

1. Argentina (ARG):
  - Rosario Central (2026 Liga Profesional aggregate table 2nd place) has qualified for either the Argentina 2 or the Argentina 4 berth.
  - Argentinos Juniors (2026 Liga Profesional aggregate table 3rd place) has qualified for either the Argentina 4 or Argentina 5 berth.
  - Independiente Rivadavia (2026 Liga Profesional aggregate table 4th place) has qualified for one of the following berths: Argentina 2, Argentina 5 or Argentina 6.
2. Bolivia (BOL):
  - Bolívar (2026 División Profesional top three) has qualified for one of the following berths: Bolivia 1, Bolivia 2 or Bolivia 4.
  - Always Ready (2026 División Profesional top three) has qualified for one of the following berths: Bolivia 1, Bolivia 2 or Bolivia 4. They may also qualify for the Bolivia 3 berth as 2026 Copa Bolivia champions.
3. Brazil (BRA):
  - Palmeiras may also qualify as 2026 Copa Libertadores champions.
  - Cruzeiro (2026 Campeonato Brasileiro Série A 3rd or 4th place) has qualified for either the Brazil 3 or Brazil 4 berth.
  - Fluminense (2026 Campeonato Brasileiro Série A top five) has qualified for one of the following berths: Brazil 3, Brazil 4 or Brazil 6. They will qualify for the Brazil 5 berth if they end fifth in the 2026 Campeonato Brasileiro Série A and Grêmio are relegated.
  - Grêmio (2026 Copa do Brasil champions or runners-up) will qualify for the Brazil 5 berth only if they avoid relegation from the 2026 Campeonato Brasileiro Série A.
4. Colombia (COL): Atlético Nacional (2026 Liga DIMAYOR aggregate table 1st place) has qualified for either the Colombia 2 or Colombia 3 berth.
5. Ecuador (ECU): Universidad Católica may still qualify for the Ecuador 3 berth.
6. Paraguay (PAR): Recoleta qualified for the Paraguay 4 berth since the other 2026 Copa Paraguay finalist Sol de América is ineligible to qualify for international competition.
7. Peru (PER):
  - Alianza Lima (2026 Liga 1 champions or runners-up) has qualified for either the Peru 1 or Peru 2 berth.
  - Universitario (2026 Liga 1 top three) has qualified for one of the following berths: Peru 1, Peru 2 or Peru 3.
  - Sport Huancayo (2026 Liga 1 top three) has qualified for one of the following berths: Peru 1, Peru 2 or Peru 3.
8. Uruguay (URU): Peñarol (2026 Liga AUF Uruguaya champions or runners-up) has qualified for either the Uruguay 1 or Uruguay 2 berth.
9. Venezuela (VEN):
  - Carabobo (2026 Liga FUTVE champions or runners-up) has qualified for either the Venezuela 1 or Venezuela 3 berth.
  - Deportivo Táchira (2026 Liga FUTVE aggregate table 2nd place) has qualified for either the Venezuela 1 or Venezuela 3 berth.

== Schedule ==
The schedule of the competition will be as follows:

Schedule for 2027 Copa Libertadores
Stage	Draw date	First leg	Second leg
First stage	TBD	2–4 February 2027	9–11 February 2027
Second stage	TBD	16–18 February 2027	23–25 February 2027
Third stage	TBD	2–4 March 2027	9–11 March 2027
Group stage	17 March 2027	Matchday 1: 6–8 April 2027; Matchday 2: 13–15 April 2027; Matchday 3: 27–29 April 2027; Matchday 4: 4–6 May 2027; Matchday 5: 18–20 May 2027; Matchday 6: 25–27 May 2027	
Round of 16	2 June 2027	10–12 August 2027	17–19 August 2027
Quarter-finals	2 June 2027	7–9 September 2027	14–16 September 2027
Semi-finals	2 June 2027	12–14 October 2027	19–21 October 2027
Final	2 June 2027	27 November 2027	

== See also ==
- 2027 Copa Sudamericana
