= Mario Grana =

Argentine footballer (born 1973)

Personal information
- Full name: Mario Darío Grana
- Date of birth: 27 January 1973 (age 53)
- Place of birth: Buenos Aires, Argentina
- Height: 1.76 m (5 ft 9 in)
- Position: Midfielder

Team information
- Current team: Sportivo San Lorenzo (youth coordinator)

Senior career*
Years	Team	Apps	(Gls)
1992–1996	Deportivo Morón		
1996–1997	Quilmes	18	(1)
1997–1998	Deportivo Morón		
1998–2000	Ferro Carril Oeste	57	(1)
2000–2001	Belgrano	32	(0)
2001	Ferro Carril Oeste	12	(1)
2002	Monterrey	16	(0)
2002	Atlético Celaya	18	(0)
2003	Colibríes de Morelos	19	(2)
2003	Zacatepec	21	(4)
2004–2006	Cerro Porteño	81	(6)
2006	Banfield	3	(0)
2007–2008	Deportivo Morón	39	(2)
2008–2009	Acassuso	30	(0)
2009–2010	Fénix	32	(0)
2010	El Porvenir	20	(0)
2011	Deportivo Capiatá		

Managerial career
- 2011: Deportivo Capiatá
- 2011: Cerro Porteño (youth)
- 2011–2012: Cerro Porteño
- 2012: Independiente FBC
- 2013–2014: Deportivo Morón
- 2014: Rubio Ñu
- 2015: 12 de Octubre
- 2018–2019: General Caballero CG
- 2025: Tacuary
- 2026: Sportivo San Lorenzo (interim)
- * Club domestic league appearances and goals

Mario Darío Grana (born 27 January 1973) is an Argentine football manager and former footballer who played as a midfielder. He is the current youth coordinator of Paraguayan club Sportivo San Lorenzo.

== Early life ==
Grana grew up regarding Argentine international Diego Maradona as his football idol. He studied for a degree in electromechanics.

== Playing career ==
In 2004, Grana signed for Paraguayan side Cerro Porteño, where he was regarded as a fan favorite. In 2010, he signed for Argentine side El Porvenir, where he captained the club.

== Style of play ==
Grana mainly operated as a left-midfielder.

== Managerial career ==
Grana started his managerial career as player-manager of Paraguayan side Deportivo Capiatá. In 2011, he was appointed manager of Paraguayan side Cerro Porteño. After that, he was appointed manager of Argentine side Morón. While managing the club, he was attacked by barra bravas.

== Personal life ==
Grana has a son.

Grana competed in Paraguayan reality television show Baila conmigo Paraguay 2017.
