= Josué Ortiz =

Venezuelan football manager (born 1980)

Personal information
- Full name: Josué Daniel Ortiz
- Date of birth: 5 January 1980 (age 46)
- Place of birth: Barinas, Venezuela

Team information
- Current team: Zamora (manager)

Managerial career
- Years: Team
- Deportivo Barinas (youth)
- Zamora (youth)
- 2013: Potros de Barinas
- 2015: Deportivo Anzoátegui (assistant)
- 2016–2017: Atlético Socopó (assistant)
- 2019: Llaneros (assistant)
- 2019–2020: Trujillanos (assistant)
- 2021: Venezuela U20 (assistant)
- 2021: Academia Puerto Cabello (assistant)
- 2022: Aragua (assistant)
- 2024–2025: Zamora (assistant)
- 2025: Titanes
- 2026: Zamora B
- 2026–: Zamora

Josué Daniel Ortiz (born 5 January 1980) is a Venezuelan football manager, currently in charge of Zamora.

== Career ==
Born in Barinas, Ortiz worked in the youth sides of Deportivo Barinas and Zamora before beginning his senior coaching career with Potros de Barinas in 2013. In the following seasons, he worked as an assistant at Deportivo Anzoátegui, Atlético Socopó and Llaneros.

In 2019, Ortiz joined Martín Carrillo's staff at Trujillanos, also as an assistant. He followed Carrillo to the Venezuela national under-20 team in December 2020, and later to Academia Puerto Cabello.

Ortiz worked as an assistant at Aragua in 2022, before returning to Zamora in April 2024, as Alí Cañas' assistant. On 6 August 2025, he returned to managerial duties after being appointed in charge of Titanes in the Liga FUTVE 2.

After narrowly missing out promotion to the top tier, Ortiz returned to Zamora and was named manager of the B-team ahead of the 2026 season. On 17 July of that year, he was appointed manager of Zamora's first team.
