= Gerardo Alcoba =

Uruguayan footballer (born 1984)

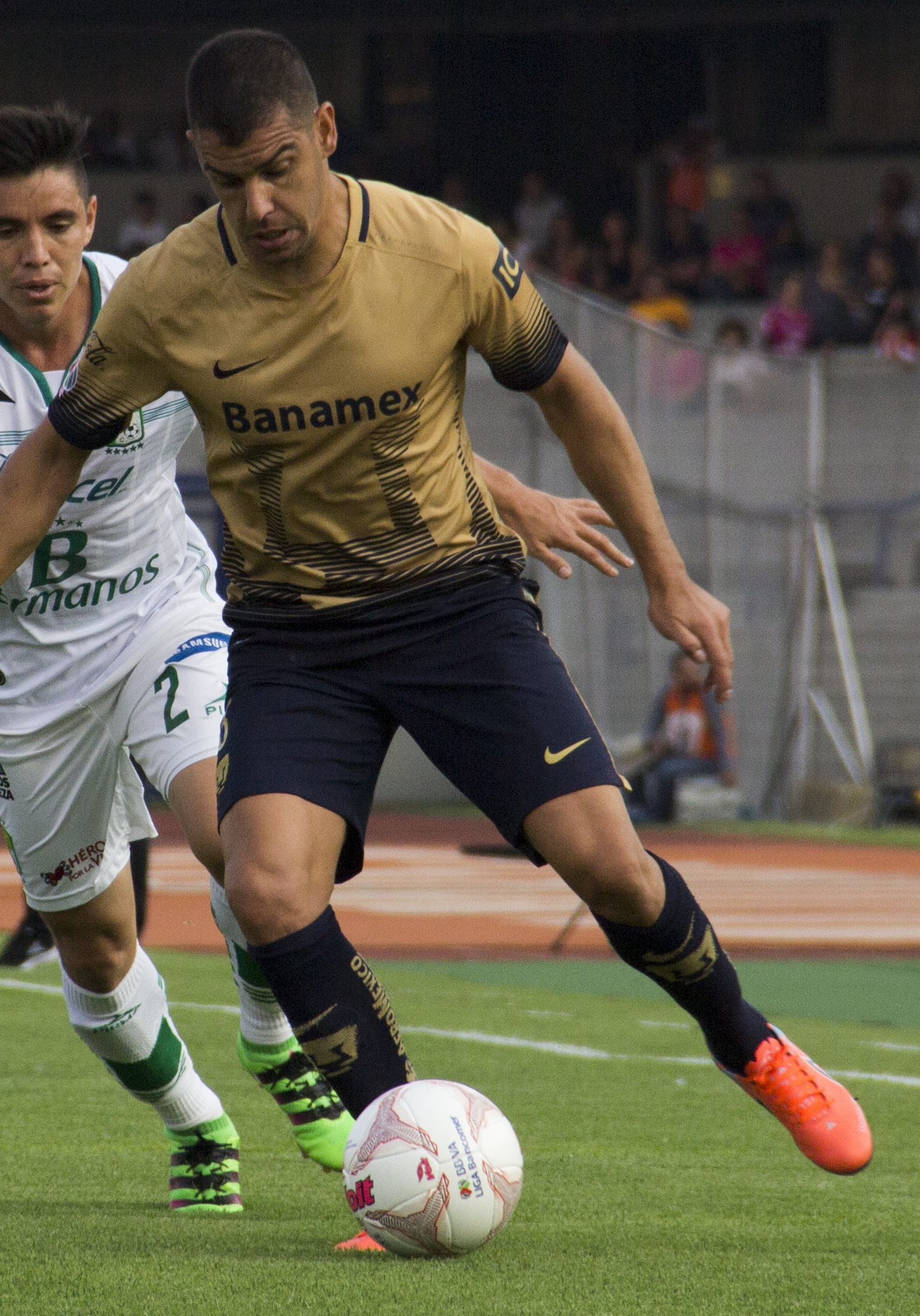
- Alcoba at the Pumas vs León match in 2016

Personal information
- Full name: Gerardo Alcoba Rebollo
- Date of birth: 25 November 1984 (age 41)
- Place of birth: Paso de los Toros, Uruguay
- Height: 1.84 m (6 ft 0 in)
- Position: Centre-back

Youth career
- Montevideo Wanderers

Senior career*
Years	Team	Apps	(Gls)
2004–2007	Montevideo Wanderers	73	(6)
2007–2011	Peñarol	72	(9)
2012–2014	Colón	63	(3)
2014	LDU Quito	19	(2)
2015–2018	UNAM	86	(7)
2018	Santos Laguna	21	(0)
2019–2020	Tigre	28	(0)
2020–2021	Montevideo Wanderers	14	(0)

International career
2008	Uruguay	2	(0)
- * Club domestic league appearances and goals

Gerardo Alcoba Rebollo (born 25 November 1984 in Montevideo) is a retired Uruguayan professional footballer.

== International career ==
Alcoba has made two appearances for the senior Uruguay national football team, and his debut was a friendly against Turkey on 20 August 2008.

== Honours ==
=== Club ===
Santos Laguna

- Liga MX: Clausura 2018
