= Eduardo Ledesma =

Paraguayan football manager and former player (born 1985)

Personal information
- Full name: Eduardo Fabián Ledesma Trinidad
- Date of birth: 7 August 1985 (age 41)
- Place of birth: Asunción, Paraguay
- Height: 1.80 m (5 ft 11 in)
- Position: Midfielder

Team information
- Current team: 2 de Mayo (manager)

Senior career*
Years	Team	Apps	(Gls)
2005	Olimpia	1	(0)
2006–2014	Lanús	117	(1)
2012–2013	→ Godoy Cruz (loan)	20	(0)
2013	→ Rosario Central (loan)	1	(0)
2014	→ LDU Quito (loan)	12	(0)
2014	Olimpia	14	(0)
2015	Temperley	23	(1)
2016	General Díaz	20	(0)
2017	Deportivo Capiatá	33	(1)
2018	3 de Febrero	1	(0)
2018	Rubio Ñu		
2019–2020	Resistencia		

International career
2008–2010	Paraguay	10	(0)

Managerial career
- 2023–2025: 2 de Mayo (assistant)
- 2025: 2 de Mayo (assistant)
- 2026–: 2 de Mayo
- * Club domestic league appearances and goals

Eduardo Fabián Ledesma Trinidad (born 7 August 1985) is a Paraguayan football manager and former player who played as a midfielder. He is the current manager of 2 de Mayo.

== Honours ==
Lanús

- Argentine Primera División (1): 2007 Apertura
