= 2014 in Ecuadorian football =

Football in Ecuador
- Season: 2014

The 2014 season is the 92nd season of competitive football in Ecuador.

== Clubs in international competition ==
Team	2014 Copa Libertadores	2014 Copa Sudamericana
Barcelona	N/A	Eliminated in Second Stage
Deportivo Quito	Eliminated in the First Stage	N/A
Emelec	Eliminated in the Group Stage	In the Round of 16
Independiente del Valle	Eliminated in the Group Stage	Eliminated in Second Stage
Universidad Católica	N/A	Eliminated in Second Stage

== National teams ==
=== Senior team ===
==== FIFA World Cup ====
Ecuador qualified for 2014 FIFA World Cup, their third finals qualification.

===== Group stage =====
Ecuador were drawn into Group E with Switzerland, France, and Honduras. With a loss, a win, and a draw, Ecuador finished third in the group and did not advance to the Round of 16.

Pos	Team	Pld	W	D	L	GF	GA	GD	Pts	Qualification
1	France	3	2	1	0	8	2	+6	7	Advance to knockout stage
2	Switzerland	3	2	0	1	7	6	+1	6	Advance to knockout stage
3	Ecuador	3	1	1	1	3	3	0	4	
4	Honduras	3	0	0	3	1	8	−7	0	

Source: FIFA
Rules for classification: Tie-breaking criteria

June 15, 2014 Group Stage	Switzerland	2–1	Ecuador	Brasília, Brazil
13:00 UTC−3	Mehmedi 48'; Seferovic 90+3'	Report	E. Valencia 22'	Stadium: Estádio Nacional Mané Garrincha; Attendance: 68,351; Referee: Ravshan Irmatov (Uzbekistan)

June 20, 2014 Group Stage	Honduras	1–2	Ecuador	Curitiba, Brazil
19:00 UTC−3	Costly 31'	Report	E. Valencia 34', 65'	Stadium: Arena da Baixada; Attendance: 39,224; Referee: Ben Williams (Australia)

June 25, 2014 Group Stage	Ecuador	0–0	France	Rio de Janeiro, Brazil
17:00 UTC−3		Report		Stadium: Estádio do Maracanã; Attendance: 73,749; Referee: Noumandiez Doué (Ivory Coast)

==== Friendlies ====
March 5, 2014	Australia	3–4	Ecuador	London, England
20:00	Cahill 8', 31'; Jedinak 15' (pen.)	Report	Martínez 56'; Castillo 60' (pen.); E. Valencia 76'; Méndez 90+1'	Stadium: The Den; Attendance: 7,133; Referee: Lee Probert (England)

May 17, 2014	Netherlands	1–1	Ecuador	Amsterdam, Netherlands
20:30	van Persie 37'	Report	Montero 9'	Stadium: Amsterdam Arena; Attendance: 50,000; Referee: Pavel Královec (Czech Republic)

May 31, 2014	Mexico	3–1	Ecuador	Arlington, Texas, United States
11:00	Montes 33'; Fabián 69'; Banguera 76' (o.g.)	Report	E. Valencia 80'	Stadium: AT&T Stadium; Attendance: 84,878; Referee: John Pitti (Panama)

June 4, 2014	England	2–2	Ecuador	Miami Gardens, Florida, United States
15:00	Rooney 28'; Lambert 50'	Report	E. Valencia 7'; Arroyo 69'	Stadium: Sun Life Stadium; Attendance: 21,534; Referee: Jair Marrufo (United States)

September 6, 2014	Bolivia	0–4	Ecuador	Fort Lauderdale, Florida, United States
20:00 UTC−4		Report	Noboa 9'; Cazares 34'; E. Valencia 65'; Sornoza 84'	Stadium: Lockhart Stadium; Referee: Valdrin Legister (Jamaica)

September 9, 2014	Ecuador	0–1	Brazil	East Rutherford, New Jersey, United States
20:30		Report	Willian 31'	Stadium: MetLife Stadium; Attendance: 35,975

October 10, 2014	United States	1–1	Ecuador	East Hartford, Connecticut, United States
19:00 UTC-4	Diskerud 5'	Report	E. Valencia 88'	Stadium: Rentschler Field; Attendance: 36,265

October 14, 2014	El Salvador	1–5	Ecuador	Harrison, New Jersey, United States
19:00	Burgos 45' (pen.)	Report	Plata 16', 26'; E. Valencia 19', 73'; Penilla 83'	Stadium: Red Bull Arena
