= Pedro Vera (Venezuelan footballer) =

Venezuelan football manager (born 1958)

Personal information
- Full name: Pedro José Vera
- Date of birth: 15 September 1958 (age 68)
- Place of birth: Valera, Venezuela
- Position: Defender

Team information
- Current team: Trujillanos (sporting director)

Senior career*
Years	Team	Apps	(Gls)
- Trujillanos

Managerial career
- Trujillanos (youth)
- 1999–2000: Trujillanos
- 2005: Trujillanos
- 2009–2014: Trujillanos
- 2014–2016: Deportivo La Guaira (assistant)
- 2016–2020: Deportivo Lara (assistant)
- 2021: Deportivo Lara (assistant)
- 2021: Venezuela (assistant)
- 2022: Estudiantes de Mérida (assistant)
- 2023–2024: Caracas (assistant)
- 2025: Anzoátegui (assistant)
- 2026: Portuguesa (assistant)
- 2026: Trujillanos
- * Club domestic league appearances and goals

Pedro José Vera (born 15 September 1958) is a Venezuelan football manager and former player. He is the current sporting director of Trujillanos.

== Playing career ==
Born in Valera, Vera notably played for Trujillanos, helping the side to win the 1992 Copa Venezuela.

== Managerial career ==
After retiring, Vera worked as a manager of the youth categories of his main club Trujillanos, before first taking over the side in 1999. He left in 2000, but returned in 2005 and led the club to the second stage of the 2005 Copa Sudamericana.

In May 2009, Vera returned to Trujillanos for a third spell. He left the club on 29 May 2014, after helping the club to win the 2010 Copa Venezuela.

In June 2014, Vera joined Deportivo La Guaira, but now as an assistant to Leonardo González, his former assistant at Trujillanos. In the following years, he continued to work as González's assistant at Deportivo Lara (two stints), the Venezuela national team, Estudiantes de Mérida, Caracas, Anzoátegui and Portuguesa.

On 12 March 2026, Vera returned to managerial duties after returning to Trujillanos. On 13 July, however, he left the role to become a sporting director at the club.

== Honours ==
=== Player ===
Trujillanos

- Copa Venezuela: 1992

=== Manager ===
Trujillanos

- Copa Venezuela: 2010
