= Pablo Fornasari =

Argentine football manager (born 1984)

Personal information
- Date of birth: 11 January 1984 (age 42)
- Place of birth: Buenos Aires, Argentina

Team information
- Current team: Sportivo San Lorenzo (manager)

Managerial career
- Years: Team
- 2021–2022: Banfield (assistant)
- 2022–2023: Huracán (assistant)
- 2023–2024: Instituto (assistant)
- 2025: Central Norte
- 2026: Racing de Córdoba
- 2026–: Sportivo San Lorenzo

Pablo Fornasari (born 11 January 1984) is an Argentine football coach, currently the manager of Paraguayan club Sportivo San Lorenzo.

== Career ==
Born in Buenos Aires, Fornasari worked as an analyst with Marcelo Gómez's staff at Vélez Sarsfield's youth categories and Godoy Cruz, before becoming an assistant of Diego Dabove at Banfield, Huracán and Instituto.

On 20 May 2025, Fornasari was appointed manager of Primera Nacional side Central Norte. He resigned on 18 November, and agreed to take over Racing de Córdoba seven days later.

On 5 May 2026, Fornasari was sacked by Racing. On 30 August, he moved to Paraguay and took over Sportivo San Lorenzo.
