= 2017 Liga Deportiva Universitaria de Quito season =

L.D.U. Quito
2017 season
- President: Guillermo Romero
- Manager: Gustavo Munúa (until July 4); Pablo Repetto (since July 6)
- Stadium: Estadio Rodrigo Paz Delgado
- Serie A: 8th
- Conmebol Sudamericana: Round of 16
- Top goalscorer: League: Hernán Barcos (21 goals); All: Hernán Barcos (24 goals)
- Highest home attendance: 29,710; (June 21 v. Barcelona SC)
- Lowest home attendance: 3,520; (May 20 v. Fuerza Amarilla)
- Average home league attendance: 11,647
| Home colours | Away colours | Third colours |

Liga Deportiva Universitaria de Quito's 2017 season was the club's 87th year of existence, the 64th year in professional football, and the 56th in the top level of professional football in Ecuador.

== Club ==
=== Personnel ===
President: Guillermo Romero
Honorary President: Rodrigo Paz
President of the Executive Commission: Esteban Paz
President of the Football Commission: Edwin Ripalda
Vice-President of the Football Commission: Patricio Torres
Sporting manager: Santiago Jácome

=== Coaching staff ===
Manager: Pablo Repetto
Assistant manager: Óscar Quagliatta, Franklin Salas
Physical trainer: Roberto Teixeira
Goalkeeper trainer: Luis Preti

=== Kits ===
Supplier: Umbro
Sponsor(s): Chevrolet, Discover, DirecTV, Roland

==== Breast cancer awareness month kit ====
Home kit

L.D.U. Quito wore this uniform in October.

== Squad information ==
| Num | Pos | Nat. | Player | Age | Since | App | Goals | Notes |
|---|---|---|---|---|---|---|---|---|
| 1 | GK | ECU | Leonel Nazareno | 22 | 2015 | 2 | 0 | |
| 2 | DF | ECU | Norberto Araujo | 38 | 2007 | 319 | 2 | |
| 3 | DF | ECU | John Narváez | 25 | 2016 | 14 | 1 | |
| 4 | DF | URU | Horacio Salaberry | 29 | 2017 | 0 | 0 | |
| 5 | MF | ECU | Jefferson Intriago | 20 | 2014 | 75 | 1 | |
| 6 | MF | ECU | Édison Vega | 26 | 2016 | 33 | 0 | |
| 7 | DF | ECU | Aníbal Chalá | 20 | 2017 | 0 | 0 | |
| 8 | MF | ECU | Fernando Hidalgo | 31 | 2011 | 223 | 9 | |
| 9 | FW | ECU | Ronie Carrillo | 20 | 2017 | 0 | 0 | |
| 10 | MF | ECU | Francisco Cevallos | 21 | 2014 | 148 | 31 | Previously with the club from '11–'12 |
| 11 | MF | ECU | Jonathan González | 21 | 2017 | 0 | 0 | |
| 12 | GK | ECU | Erik Viveros | 20 | 2017 | 0 | 0 | |
| 13 | MF | ECU | William Ocles | 18 | 2017 | 0 | 0 | |
| 14 | DF | ECU | José Quintero | 26 | 2015 | 77 | 6 | |
| 16 | FW | ARG | Hernán Barcos (captain) | 32 | 2017 | 64 | 38 | Previously with the club from '10–'11 |
| 17 | FW | ECU | Juan Luis Anangonó | 27 | 2016 | 40 | 14 | Previously with the club in '14 |
| 18 | MF | ECU | Álex Bolaños | 31 | 2017 | 0 | 0 | Previously with the club in '09 |
| 19 | DF | ECU | Henry Quiñónez | 23 | 2017 | 0 | 0 | |
| 20 | MF | COL | Sherman Cárdenas | 27 | 2017 | 0 | 0 | |
| 21 | FW | ECU | Djorkaeff Reasco | 17 | 2016 | 1 | 0 | |
| 22 | DF | BRA | Lucas Tagliapietra | 26 | 2017 | 0 | 0 | |
| 25 | GK | ECU | Daniel Viteri | 35 | 2011 | 80 | 0 | Previously with the club from '08–'09 |
| 26 | MF | ECU | Jhojan Julio | 18 | 2016 | 8 | 0 | |
| 27 | MF | ECU | Jonathan Betancourt | 21 | 2017 | 0 | 0 | |
| 29 | DF | ECU | Édison Carcelén | 24 | 2017 | 0 | 0 | |
| 31 | MF | ECU | Anderson Julio | 20 | 2016 | 14 | 2 | |
| 33 | DF | ECU | Luis Cangá | 21 | 2014 | 54 | 3 | |

Note: Caps and goals are of the national league and are current as of the beginning of the season.

=== Winter transfers ===
Players In
| Name | Nat | Pos | Age | Moving from |
|---|---|---|---|---|
| Jonathan Betancourt | ECU | DF | 21 | Aucas (Ecuador) |
| Édison Carcelén | ECU | DF | 24 | Aucas (Ecuador) |
| Henry Quiñónez | ECU | DF | 23 | Manta (Ecuador) |
| Horacio Salaberry | URU | DF | 29 | Santa Fe (Colombia) |
| Álex Bolaños | ECU | MF | 31 | Aucas (Ecuador) |
| Jonathan González | ECU | MF | 21 | Olimpia (Paraguay) |
| Rubén Olivera | URU | MF | 33 | Latina (Italy) |
| Felipe Rodríguez | URU | MF | 26 | Chiapas F.C. (Mexico) |
| Hernán Barcos | ARG | FW | 32 | Vélez Sarsfield (Argentina) |
| Ronie Carrillo | ECU | FW | 20 | América (Ecuador) |

Players Out
| Name | Nat | Pos | Age | Moving to |
|---|---|---|---|---|
| Gabriel Cevallos | ECU | GK | 18 | Barcelona SC (Ecuador) |
| Ramón Arias | URU | DF | 24 | Peñarol (Uruguay) |
| Julio Ayoví | ECU | DF | 34 | L.D.U. Portoviejo (Ecuador) |
| José Madrid | ECU | DF | 28 | Delfín (Ecuador) |
| Néicer Reasco | ECU | DF | 39 | Aucas (Ecuador) |
| Luis Romero | ECU | DF | 32 | River Ecuador |
| Brahian Alemán | URU | MF | 27 | Gimnasia y Esgrima La Plata (Argentina) |
| Exequiel Benavídez | ARG | MF | 27 | Sud América (Uruguay) |
| Luis Bolaños | ECU | MF | 31 | Fuerza Amarilla (Ecuador) |
| Enrique Vera | ECU | MF | 37 | Sportivo Luqueño (Paraguay) |
| Alejandro Villalva | ECU | MF | 24 | El Nacional (Ecuador) |
| Daniel Angulo | ECU | FW | 30 | Deportivo Pasto (Colombia) |
| Irven Ávila | PER | FW | 26 | Sporting Cristal (Peru) |
| Jairo Padilla | ECU | FW | 25 | Macará (Ecuador) |
| Carlos Tenorio | ECU | FW | 37 | Sport Boys Warnes (Bolivia) |

=== Summer transfers ===
Players In
| Name | Nat | Pos | Age | Moving from |
|---|---|---|---|---|
| Aníbal Chalá | ECU | DF | 20 | FC Dallas (United States) |
| Lucas Tagliapietra | BRA | DF | 26 | Boavista (Portugal) |
| Sherman Cárdenas | COL | MF | 27 | Vitória (Brazil) |

Players Out
| Name | Nat | Pos | Age | Moving to |
|---|---|---|---|---|
| Fernando Guerrero | ECU | MF | 27 | Chapecoense (Brazil) |
| Rubén Olivera | URU | MF | 33 | TBA |
| Felipe Rodríguez | URU | MF | 26 | Godoy Cruz (Argentina) |
| Hancel Batalla | ECU | FW | 19 | Manta (Ecuador) |

== Competitions ==
| Competition | Started round | Final position / round | First match | Last match |
|---|---|---|---|---|
| Serie A | First Stage | 8th | January 29 | December 8 |
| Copa Sudamericana | First Stage | Round of 16 | February 28 | September 21 |

=== Pre-season friendlies ===
| January 26 Noche Blanca | L.D.U. Quito | 4–3 | Deportivo Cali | Quito |
| 19:30 UTC−05:00 | Olivera 19'; Betancourt 72'; Cevallos 76', 79' | | Duque 50' (pen.); Lloreda 58'; Roa 71' | Stadium: Estadio Rodrigo Paz Delgado; Referee: Juan Albarracín |

=== Serie A ===
The 2017 season was Liga's 56th season in the Serie A and their 16th consecutive. The format was identical to the previous season.

==== First stage ====
| Pos | Team | Pld | W | D | L | GF | GA | GD | Pts |
|---|---|---|---|---|---|---|---|---|---|
| 8 | River Ecuador | 22 | 6 | 8 | 8 | 20 | 25 | −5 | 26 |
| 9 | El Nacional | 22 | 5 | 8 | 9 | 27 | 36 | −9 | 23 |
| 10 | LDU Quito | 22 | 3 | 10 | 9 | 25 | 32 | −7 | 19 |
| 11 | Fuerza Amarilla | 22 | 2 | 10 | 10 | 17 | 31 | −14 | 16 |
| 12 | Clan Juvenil | 22 | 2 | 6 | 14 | 19 | 46 | −27 | 12 |

Source: FEF, Soccerway
Rules for classification: 1) Points, 2) Goal difference, 3) Goals for, 4) Away goals for, 5) Goals against, 6) Head-to-head record, 7) Penalty shootout.
If a penalty shootout is not possible: 7) Drawing of lots or playoff game

Results summary

| Overall | | | | | | | | Home | | | | | | Away | | | | | |
| Pld | W | D | L | GF | GA | GD | Pts | W | D | L | GF | GA | GD | W | D | L | GF | GA | GD |
|---|---|---|---|---|---|---|---|---|---|---|---|---|---|---|---|---|---|---|---|
| 22 | 3 | 10 | 9 | 25 | 32 | −7 | 19 | 3 | 6 | 2 | 19 | 12 | +7 | 0 | 4 | 7 | 6 | 20 | −14 |

Results by round

| Round | 1 | 2 | 3 | 4 | 5 | 6 | 7 | 8 | 9 | 10 | 11 | 12 | 13 | 14 | 15 | 16 | 17 | 18 | 19 | 20 | 21 | 22 |
|---|---|---|---|---|---|---|---|---|---|---|---|---|---|---|---|---|---|---|---|---|---|---|
| Ground | A | H | A | H | H | A | A | A | H | A | H | A | H | A | H | H | H | A | A | H | A | H |
| Result | D | L | L | W | D | L | L | D | D | L | D | D | L | L | D | D | W | L | D | D | L | W |
| Position | 8 | 10 | 11 | 9 | 8 | 9 | 9 | 9 | 9 | 10 | 9 | 9 | 9 | 11 | 10 | 11 | 10 | 11 | 11 | 11 | 11 | 10 |

Updated to match(es) played on July 8, 2017. Source: Competitive matches
A = Away; H = Home; W = Win; D = Draw; L = Loss

| January 29 Round 1 | Clan Juvenil | 0–0 | L.D.U. Quito | Sangolquí |
| 11:30 UTC−05:00 | Vayas (yellow card) 78' | Report | Bolaños (yellow card) 76'; Vega (yellow card) 90' | Stadium: Estadio Rumiñahui; Attendance: 4,482; Referee: Luis Quiroz |

| February 5 Round 2 | L.D.U. Quito | 0–2 | Delfín | Quito |
| 11:30 UTC−05:00 | Intriago (yellow card) 29'; Quintero (yellow card) 89' | Report | Cangá 43' (o.g.); Murillo 45'; Mera (yellow card) 18' | Stadium: Estadio Rodrigo Paz Delgado; Attendance: 21,560; Referee: Omar Ponce |

| February 12 Round 3 | Emelec | 2–0 | L.D.U. Quito | Guayaquil |
| 16:30 UTC−05:00 | Vides 37'; Caicedo 41'; Dreer (yellow card) 10' de Jesús (yellow card) 82'; Bagüí (yellow card) 87' | Report | Araujo (yellow card) 10'; Barcos (yellow card) 42'; Carcelén (yellow card) 48'; Quintero (yellow card) 56' | Stadium: Estadio George Capwell; Attendance: 25,009; Referee: José Luis Espinel |

| February 24 Round 4 | L.D.U. Quito | 4–0 | River Ecuador | Quito |
| 19:30 UTC−05:00 | Barcos 35', 48', (yellow card) 44'; Cevallos 52', 58', (yellow card) 50'; Guerrero (yellow card) 10'; A. Julio (yellow card) 38'; Bolaños (red card) 45' | Report | Realpe (yellow card) 42'; Frascarelli (red card) 45'; Romero (yellow card) 53' | Stadium: Estadio Rodrigo Paz Delgado; Attendance: 8,732; Referee: Roddy Zambrano |

| March 5 Round 5 | L.D.U. Quito | 1–1 | Independiente del Valle | Quito |
| 11:30 UTC−05:00 | Barcos 60'; Quiñónez (yellow card) 1'; Guerrero (yellow card) 74'; Narváez (yellow card) 86' | Report | Estrada 67'; Arce (yellow card) 9'; Mera (yellow card) 15' | Stadium: Estadio Rodrigo Paz Delgado; Attendance: 12,186; Referee: Carlos Orbe |

| March 11 Round 6 | Universidad Católica | 3–0 | L.D.U. Quito | Quito |
| 12:00 UTC−05:00 | Defederico 4'; Cifuente 12', (yellow card) 50'; Obando 76'; Martínez (yellow card) 43' | Report | Guerrero (yellow card) 52'; Olivera (yellow card) 60'; Betancourt (yellow card) 67'; Cangá (yellow card) 82' | Stadium: Estadio Olímpico Atahualpa; Attendance: 5,123; Referee: Guillermo Guerrero |

| March 26 Round 8 | Fuerza Amarilla | 1–1 | L.D.U. Quito | Machala |
| 15:00 UTC−05:00 | Cócaro 60' (pen.) | Report | Barcos 64'; Olivera (yellow card) 76'; Salaberry (yellow card) 86' | Stadium: Estadio 9 de Mayo; Attendance: 994; Referee: Omar Ponce |

| April 10 Round 9 | L.D.U. Quito | 1–1 | Deportivo Cuenca | Quito |
| 19:15 UTC−05:00 | Barcos 53'; Hidalgo (yellow card) 47'; Narváez (yellow card) 89'; Bolaños (yellow card) 90+2' | Report | Ávila 71', (yellow card) 85'; Johnson (yellow card) 11' | Stadium: Estadio Rodrigo Paz Delgado; Attendance: 8,038; Referee: Franklin Congo |

| April 16 Round 10 | Macará | 1–0 | L.D.U. Quito | Ambato |
| 12:00 UTC−05:00 | Arboleda 90+1', (yellow card) 86'; Quiñónez (yellow card) 75' | Report | Guerrero (yellow card) 18'; Vega (yellow card) 37'; Salaberry (yellow card) 78' | Stadium: Estadio Bellavista; Attendance: 8,288; Referee: Vinicio Espinel |

| April 22 Round 11 | L.D.U. Quito | 2–2 | El Nacional | Quito |
| 18:30 UTC−05:00 | Betancourt 6'; A. Julio 60', (yellow card) 42' (yellow-red card) 62'; Olivera (yellow card) 28'; Salaberry (yellow card) 55' | Report | Muñoz 34' de Jesús 64' (pen.); Segovia (yellow card) 23'; Guerra (yellow card) 55'; Larrea (yellow card) 56' (yellow-red card) 67' | Stadium: Estadio Rodrigo Paz Delgado; Attendance: 13,299; Referee: Roddy Zambrano |

| April 30 Round 12 | El Nacional | 1–1 | L.D.U. Quito | Quito |
| 11:15 UTC−05:00 | Quintero 89'; Guerra (yellow card) 59' | Report | Betancourt 12'; Olivera (yellow card) 10'; Intriago (yellow card) 60'; Salaberry (yellow card) 68'; Barcos (yellow card) 74'; Viteri (yellow card) 86' | Stadium: Estadio Olímpico Atahualpa; Attendance: 15,099; Referee: Daniel Salazar |

| May 6 Round 13 | L.D.U. Quito | 2–3 | Macará | Quito |
| 18:30 UTC−05:00 | Salaberry 20'; Barcos 72', (yellow card) 32'; González (yellow card) 44'; Intriago (yellow card) 45+1'; A. Julio (yellow card) 90+1' | Report | Feraud 18', 55'; Tévez 23' (pen.); Champang (yellow card) 33'; Arboleda (yellow card) 35'; Corozo (yellow card) 90+5' | Stadium: Estadio Rodrigo Paz Delgado; Attendance: 8,302; Referee: Carlos Orbe |

| May 10 Round 7 (Postponed) | Barcelona SC | 3–1 | L.D.U. Quito | Guayaquil |
| 19:15 UTC−05:00 | Díaz 16'; Arreaga 30'; Álvez 89' (pen.); Ayoví (yellow card) 24'; Márques (yellow card) 42' | Report | Barcos 72'; Narváez (yellow card) 14' (yellow-red card) 73'; Salaberry (yellow card) 28'; Hidalgo (yellow card) 64'; Carcelén (yellow card) 74'; Intriago (yellow card) 83' | Stadium: Estadio Monumental Banco Pichincha; Attendance: 12,532; Referee: Diego Lara |

| May 14 Round 14 | Deportivo Cuenca | 2–0 | L.D.U. Quito | Cuenca |
| 10:30 UTC−05:00 | Schunke 38'; Dinenno 90', (yellow card) 75'; Johnson (yellow card) 29' | Report | Quiñónez (yellow card) 28'; Intriago (yellow card) 61'; Olivera (yellow card) 68' | Stadium: Estadio Alejandro Serrano Aguilar; Attendance: 3,133; Referee: José Luis Espinel |

| May 20 Round 15 | L.D.U. Quito | 1–1 | Fuerza Amarilla | Quito |
| 18:30 UTC−05:00 | Cevallos 16'; Salaberry (yellow card) 9' (yellow-red card) 89'; Narváez (yellow card) 39' | Report | Cócaro 49'; Quintero (yellow card) 34'; Chila (yellow card) 45'; Fernández (yellow card) 81' | Stadium: Estadio Rodrigo Paz Delgado; Attendance: 3,520; Referee: Ángel Hidalgo |

| June 10 Round 18 | Independiente del Valle | 2–1 | L.D.U. Quito | Quito |
| 16:00 UTC−05:00 | Arce 63', (yellow card) 27'; Estrada 83' (pen.); Arroyo (yellow card) 50'; Segovia (yellow card) 87' | Report | Anangonó 16'; Narváez (yellow card) 36'; Quiñónez (yellow card) 50'; Barcos (yellow card) 90+3' | Stadium: Estadio Olímpico Atahualpa; Attendance: 6,845; Referee: Luis Quiroz |

| June 16 Round 19 | River Ecuador | 1–1 | L.D.U. Quito | Guayaquil |
| 16:15 UTC−05:00 | Alaniz 9', (yellow card) 70'; Rojas (yellow card) 51' | Report | Anangonó 57'; Intriago (yellow card) 22'; Bolaños (yellow card) 81' | Stadium: Estadio Christian Benítez Betancourt; Attendance: 344; Referee: Guillermo Guerrero |

| June 21 Round 16 (Postponed) | L.D.U. Quito | 1–1 | Barcelona SC | Quito |
| 19:15 UTC−05:00 | Cevallos 15'; Bolaños (yellow card) 38'; Intriago (yellow card) 51'; Vega (yellow card) 58' | Report | Díaz 11'; Esterilla (yellow card) 27'; Arreaga (yellow card) 48'; Pineida (yellow card) 52'; Velasco (yellow card) 58' | Stadium: Estadio Rodrigo Paz Delgado; Attendance: 29,710; Referee: José Luis Espinel |

| June 25 Round 20 | L.D.U. Quito | 1–1 | Emelec | Quito |
| 11:30 UTC−05:00 | Anangonó 67'; Intriago (yellow card) 12'; Cevallos (yellow card) 21'; Bolaños (yellow card) 54'; González (yellow card) 78' | Report | Vides 17'; Ramos (yellow card) 35'; Mondaini (yellow card) 47'; Bagüí (yellow card) 57'; Quiñónez (yellow card) 73'; Píriz (yellow card) 90+1' | Stadium: Estadio Rodrigo Paz Delgado; Attendance: 13,166; Referee: Vinicio Espinel |

| July 2 Round 21 | Delfín | 4–1 | L.D.U. Quito | Manta |
| 12:00 UTC−05:00 | Ordóñez 47', 86', (yellow card) 4'; Nazareno 54'; Mera 88' | Report | Chancellor 44' (o.g.); Cevallos (yellow card) 23'; Barcos (yellow card) 30' | Stadium: Estadio Jocay; Attendance: 3,500; Referee: Diego Lara |

| July 5 Round 17 (Postponed) | L.D.U. Quito | 1–0 | Universidad Católica | Quito |
| 19:15 UTC−05:00 | Carrillo 86'; Bolaños (yellow card) 75'; Araujo (yellow card) 76' (yellow-red card) 90+1' | Report | Martínez (yellow card) 65'; Carabalí (yellow card) 73'; López (yellow card) 87'; Cifuente (red card) 90+3' | Stadium: Estadio Rodrigo Paz Delgado; Attendance: 6,069; Referee: Marlon Vera |

| July 8 Round 22 | L.D.U. Quito | 5–0 | Clan Juvenil | Quito |
| 18:30 UTC−05:00 | Cangá 8'; Barcos 13'; Anangonó 30'; Salaberry 66'; Quiñónez 78', (yellow card) 79' | Report | Cabezas (yellow card) 81' | Stadium: Estadio Rodrigo Paz Delgado; Attendance: 8,089; Referee: Roddy Zambrano |

==== Second stage ====
| Pos | Team | Pld | W | D | L | GF | GA | GD | Pts |
|---|---|---|---|---|---|---|---|---|---|
| 3 | Macará | 22 | 10 | 7 | 5 | 28 | 17 | +11 | 37 |
| 4 | Delfín | 22 | 9 | 10 | 3 | 30 | 20 | +10 | 37 |
| 5 | LDU Quito | 22 | 10 | 5 | 7 | 41 | 32 | +9 | 35 |
| 6 | Independiente del Valle | 22 | 9 | 7 | 6 | 41 | 30 | +11 | 34 |
| 7 | Barcelona | 22 | 8 | 8 | 6 | 26 | 20 | +6 | 32 |

Source: FEF, Soccerway
Rules for classification: 1) Points, 2) Goal difference, 3) Goals for, 4) Away goals for, 5) Goals against, 6) Head-to-head record, 7) Penalty shootout.
If a penalty shootout is not possible: 7) Drawing of lots or playoff game

Results summary

| Overall | | | | | | | | Home | | | | | | Away | | | | | |
| Pld | W | D | L | GF | GA | GD | Pts | W | D | L | GF | GA | GD | W | D | L | GF | GA | GD |
|---|---|---|---|---|---|---|---|---|---|---|---|---|---|---|---|---|---|---|---|
| 22 | 10 | 5 | 7 | 41 | 32 | +9 | 35 | 7 | 2 | 2 | 27 | 16 | +11 | 3 | 3 | 5 | 14 | 16 | −2 |

Results by round

| Round | 1 | 2 | 3 | 4 | 5 | 6 | 7 | 8 | 9 | 10 | 11 | 12 | 13 | 14 | 15 | 16 | 17 | 18 | 19 | 20 | 21 | 22 |
|---|---|---|---|---|---|---|---|---|---|---|---|---|---|---|---|---|---|---|---|---|---|---|
| Ground | A | H | A | H | H | A | H | A | H | H | H | A | A | A | H | A | H | A | A | H | A | H |
| Result | D | W | L | D | W | L | D | L | W | W | W | W | D | D | W | L | L | W | L | L | W | W |
| Position | 7 | 4 | 7 | 7 | 6 | 7 | 7 | 8 | 6 | 5 | 7 | 6 | 7 | 7 | 4 | 5 | 7 | 5 | 5 | 7 | 6 | 5 |

Updated to match(es) played on December 8, 2017. Source: Competitive matches
A = Away; H = Home; W = Win; D = Draw; L = Loss

| July 16 Round 1 | Clan Juvenil | 0–0 | L.D.U. Quito | Sangolquí |
| 12:00 UTC−05:00 | Bolaños (yellow card) 36'; Narváez (yellow card) 66'; Salaberry (yellow card) 74' | Report | Valencia (yellow card) 26'; Vayas (yellow card) 29'; Macías (yellow card) 31'; Chamorro (yellow card) 42' | Stadium: Estadio Rumiñahui; Attendance: 3,131; Referee: Roberto Sánchez |

| July 21 Round 2 | L.D.U. Quito | 2–1 | Deportivo Cuenca | Quito |
| 19:30 UTC−05:00 | Vega 53', (yellow card) 86'; Betancourt 68', (yellow card) 47'; González (yellow card) 82' | Report | Johnson 79', (yellow card) 56'; Cucco (yellow card) 45'; Mosquera (yellow card) 50' | Stadium: Estadio Rodrigo Paz Delgado; Attendance: 8,783; Referee: Daniel Salazar |

| July 30 Round 3 | Emelec | 2–1 | L.D.U. Quito | Guayaquil |
| 16:00 UTC−05:00 | Gaibor 28' (pen.), (yellow card) 59'; Preciado 67', (yellow card) 60'; Matamoros (yellow card) 41'; Dreer (yellow card) 74'; Ramos (yellow card) 82' | Report | Barcos 42'; Betancourt (yellow card) 34'; González (yellow card) 45+1'; Salaberry (yellow card) 54'; Bolaños (yellow card) 56'; J. Julio (yellow card) 90' | Stadium: Estadio George Capwell; Attendance: 27,259; Referee: Carlos Orbe |

| August 6 Round 4 | L.D.U. Quito | 1–1 | Guayaquil City | Quito |
| 11:30 UTC−05:00 | Anangonó 74'; Bolaños (yellow card) 22'; Intriago (yellow card) 43'; Barcos (yellow card) 45+2'; Cevallos (yellow card) 67' | Report | Rojas 84'; Caicedo (yellow card) 26'; Cevallos (red card) 35' de la Torre (yellow card) 35'; Lara (yellow card) 68' | Stadium: Estadio Rodrigo Paz Delgado; Attendance: 4,986; Referee: Juan Carlos Albarracín |

| August 13 Round 5 | L.D.U. Quito | 3–1 | Independiente del Valle | Quito |
| 11:30 UTC−05:00 | Cárdenas 4'; Barcos 23'; Cevallos 90+2', (yellow card) 90+2'; Narváez (yellow card) 32'; Bolaños (yellow card) 42'; Betancourt (yellow card) 60' | Report | León 49', (yellow card) 24'; Barreiro (yellow card) 24' (yellow-red card) 27'; Núñez (yellow card) 63'; Arce (yellow card) 90' | Stadium: Estadio Rodrigo Paz Delgado; Attendance: 6,854; Referee: Roddy Zambrano |

| August 20 Round 6 | El Nacional | 4–2 | L.D.U. Quito | Quito |
| 12:00 UTC−05:00 | De Jesús 2'; Villalva 22'; Borja 70', (yellow card) 9'; Parrales 90' (pen.) | Report | Betancourt 54'; Barcos 58' (pen.), (red card) 84'; Bolaños (yellow card) 43'; Cevallos (yellow card) 89' | Stadium: Estadio Olímpico Atahualpa; Attendance: 19,604; Referee: Omar Ponce |

| August 25 Round 7 | L.D.U. Quito | 0–0 | Barcelona SC | Quito |
| 19:30 UTC−05:00 | Narváez (yellow card) 32'; González (yellow card) 49'; Vega (yellow card) 50'; Salaberry (yellow card) 87' | Report | L. Caicedo (yellow card) 15'; Oyola (yellow card) 41'; Minda (yellow card) 46'; Díaz (yellow card) 87' | Stadium: Estadio Rodrigo Paz Delgado; Attendance: 20,505; Referee: Luis Quiroz |

| September 3 Round 8 | Delfín | 1–0 | L.D.U. Quito | Manta |
| 12:00 UTC−05:00 | Murillo 32'; Cangá (yellow card) 43'; Garcés (yellow card) 88'; Duffard (yellow card) 89' | Report | Narváez (yellow card) 19'; Salaberry (yellow card) 22'; González (yellow card) 45'; Intriago (yellow card) 90+1' | Stadium: Estadio Jocay; Attendance: 2,010; Referee: José Luis Espinel |

| September 9 Round 9 | L.D.U. Quito | 2–0 | Macará | Quito |
| 18:30 UTC−05:00 | Anangonó 37'; Narváez 72'; Betancourt (yellow card) 43' | Report | Arboleda (yellow card) 63'; Godoy (yellow card) 65'; Tévez (yellow card) 74' | Stadium: Estadio Rodrigo Paz Delgado; Attendance: 12,469; Referee: Carlos Orbe |

| September 24 Round 11 | L.D.U. Quito | 3–0 | Universidad Católica | Quito |
| 17:30 UTC−05:00 | Barcos 9'; A. Julio 75'; Cárdenas 83'; Narváez (yellow card) 51' | Report | Defederico (red card) 42' | Stadium: Estadio Rodrigo Paz Delgado; Attendance: 16,620; Referee: Guillermo Guerrero |

| September 29 Round 12 | Universidad Católica | 2–3 | L.D.U. Quito | Quito |
| 19:30 UTC−05:00 | Ibarra 5', 45+1'; Godoy (yellow card) 67'; Anangonó (yellow card) 74' de los Santos (yellow card) 89'; Lucas (yellow card) 90' | Report | Barcos 3', 84'; Salaberry 75', (yellow card) 89'; Tagliapietra (yellow card) 78' | Stadium: Estadio Olímpico Atahualpa; Attendance: 3,084; Referee: Franklin Congo |

| October 7 Round 13 | Fuerza Amarilla | 1–1 | L.D.U. Quito | Machala |
| 15:30 UTC−05:00 | Valencia 14', (yellow card) 79'; A. Wila (yellow card) 45' | Report | Barcos 69'; Narváez (yellow card) 57'; Nazareno (yellow card) 59'; J. Julio (yellow card) 86' | Stadium: Estadio 9 de Mayo; Attendance: 1,481; Referee: Luis Quiroz |

| October 15 Round 14 | Macará | 1–1 | L.D.U. Quito | Ambato |
| 12:00 UTC−05:00 | Champang 62'; Corozo (yellow card) 36'; Mercado (yellow card) 38'; Quiñónez (yellow card) 67' | Report | Anangonó 90'; Intriago (yellow card) 33'; Vega (yellow card) 54'; Barcos (yellow card) 79'; Chalá (yellow card) 84' | Stadium: Estadio Bellavista; Referee: Ángel Hidalgo |

| October 18 Round 10 (Postponed) | L.D.U. Quito | 3–1 | Fuerza Amarilla | Quito |
| 19:15 UTC−05:00 | Quintero 29'; Barcos 84', 90+2'; Chalá (yellow card) 90+3' | Report | Valencia (yellow card) 3'; Ferreira (yellow card) 29'; Zamora (yellow card) 34', (goal) 50'; Alonso (yellow card) 45+1'; Segura (yellow card) 73'; Fernández (yellow card) 79' | Stadium: Estadio Rodrigo Paz Delgado; Attendance: 4,636; Referee: Jefferson Macías |

| October 22 Round 15 | L.D.U. Quito | 5–2 | Delfín | Quito |
| 11:30 UTC−05:00 | Barcos 7', 45+1' (pen.); J. Julio 16', 82'; Cárdenas (yellow card) 19'; Anangonó 74' | Report | Luna (yellow card) 20'; Garcés 56'; Sierra (yellow card) 74'; Murillo 90+1'; Paredes (yellow card) 90+3' | Stadium: Estadio Rodrigo Paz Delgado; Attendance: 12,431; Referee: Omar Ponce |

| October 28 Round 16 | Barcelona SC | 2–0 | L.D.U. Quito | Guayaquil |
| 16:30 UTC−05:00 | Caicedo 5'; Calderón (yellow card) 44'; Esterilla (yellow card) 72'; Oyola 77'; Castillo (yellow card) 80' | Report | González (yellow card) 44'; J. Julio (yellow card) 45'; Barcos (yellow card) 73'; Intriago (yellow card) 82' | Stadium: Estadio Monumental Banco Pichincha; Attendance: 8,710; Referee: Vinicio Espinel |

| November 4 Round 17 | L.D.U. Quito | 0–3 | El Nacional | Quito |
| 18:30 UTC−05:00 | Quintero (yellow card) 25'; Chalá (yellow card) 61'; Vega (yellow card) 61'; Intriago (yellow card) 82' | Report | De Jesús 21'; Padilla (yellow card) 36'; Fuertes 61'; Nazareno 74' (o.g.); Montaño (yellow card) 90' | Stadium: Estadio Rodrigo Paz Delgado; Attendance: 17,871; Referee: Diego Lara |

| November 12 Round 18 | Independiente del Valle | 1–3 | L.D.U. Quito | Sangolquí |
| 11:30 UTC−05:00 | Ayala (yellow card) 21' (yellow-red card) 88'; Rizotto (yellow card) 46'; Arce 73'; León (red card) 90+2' | Report | Quintero 4', (yellow card) 32'; Salaberry (yellow card) 36'; Cevallos 39', (yellow card) 62'; Barcos (yellow card) 66'; Tagliapietra 67'; Vega (yellow card) 82'; Anangonó (yellow card) 90+2' | Stadium: Estadio Rumiñahui; Attendance: 2,909; Referee: Roddy Zambrano |

| November 19 Round 19 | Guayaquil City | 1–0 | L.D.U. Quito | Guayaquil |
| 15:00 UTC−05:00 | Dorregaray 41' (pen.); Ayoví (yellow card) 62'; Naula (yellow card) 71'; Romero (yellow card) 84'; Alaniz (yellow card) 90+1' | Report | Chalá (yellow card) 38'; Bolaños (yellow card) 50'; González (yellow card) 70' | Stadium: Estadio George Capwell; Referee: Jefferson Macías |

| November 26 Round 20 | L.D.U. Quito | 2–4 | Emelec | Quito |
| 11:30 UTC−05:00 | Betancourt 7', (yellow card) 56'; Ramos 9' (o.g.); Chalá (yellow card) 25'; Vega (yellow card) 46' | Report | Angulo 28'; Guagua 35'; Matamoros (yellow card) 46', (goal) 56'; Preciado 57'; Lastra (yellow card) 70' | Stadium: Estadio Rodrigo Paz Delgado; Attendance: 14,127; Referee: Daniel Salazar |

| December 2 Round 21 | Deportivo Cuenca | 1–3 | L.D.U. Quito | Cuenca |
| 15:00 UTC−05:00 | Dinenno 19', (yellow card) 62'; Piedra (yellow card) 21'; Luzarraga (yellow card) 52'; Oña (yellow card) 81' | Report | Vega (yellow card) 36'; Tagliapietra 63'; J. Julio 70', (yellow card) 76'; Reasco 79'; González (yellow card) 85' | Stadium: Estadio Alejandro Serrano Aguilar; Attendance: 3,520; Referee: Luis Quiroz |

| December 8 Round 22 | L.D.U. Quito | 6–3 | Clan Juvenil | Quito |
| 19:30 UTC−05:00 | Barcos 38', 44'; Betancourt 51'; Bolaños 78'; Reasco 86'; Ocles 90+2' | Report | Pérez 53'; Porozo 60', (yellow card) 61'; Cortéz 90+1' | Stadium: Estadio Rodrigo Paz Delgado; Attendance: 4,287; Referee: Ángel Hidalgo |

=== 2018 Copa Sudamericana playoff ===
| December 13 Copa Sudamericana playoff | Técnico Universitario | 1–2 | L.D.U. Quito | Ambato |
| 20:00 UTC−05:00 | Armas 35' (pen.); Rodríguez (yellow card) 38'; Mora (yellow card) 73'; Zambrano (yellow card) 77' | | Quintero (yellow card) 31'; Barcos (yellow card) 44', (goal) 90+1'; Vega (yellow card) 44'; Salaberry 90+3' | Stadium: Estadio Bellavista; Referee: Carlos Orbe |

| December 17 Copa Sudamericana playoff | L.D.U. Quito | 3–3 | Técnico Universitario | Quito |
| 11:30 UTC−05:00 | Cevallos 12', 50'; Barcos 17' | | Armas (yellow card) 20'; Fábio Renato 60', 68', 75'; Rodríguez (yellow card) 83' | Stadium: Estadio Rodrigo Paz Delgado; Referee: Luis Quiroz |

LDU Quito won 5–4 on aggregate.

=== CONMEBOL Sudamericana ===
L.D.U. Quito qualified to the 2017 CONMEBOL Sudamericana—their 10th participation in the continental tournament—as the 5th place of the 2016 Serie A. They entered the competition in the first stage.

==== CONMEBOL Sudamericana squad ====
| No. | Pos. | Nation | Player |
|---|---|---|---|
| 1 | GK | ECU | Leonel Nazareno |
| 2 | DF | ECU | Norberto Araujo |
| 3 | DF | ECU | John Narváez |
| 4 | DF | URU | Horacio Salaberry |
| 5 | MF | ECU | Jefferson Intriago |
| 6 | MF | ECU | Édison Vega |
| 7 | DF | ECU | Aníbal Chalá |
| 8 | MF | ECU | Fernando Hidalgo |
| 9 | FW | ECU | Ronie Carrillo |
| 10 | MF | ECU | Francisco Cevallos |
| 11 | MF | ECU | Jonathan González |
| 12 | GK | ECU | Erik Viveros |
| 13 | DF | ECU | Luis Cangá |

| No. | Pos. | Nation | Player |
|---|---|---|---|
| 14 | DF | ECU | José Quintero |
| 16 | FW | ARG | Hernán Barcos (captain) |
| 17 | FW | ECU | Juan Luis Anangonó |
| 18 | MF | ECU | Álex Bolaños |
| 19 | DF | ECU | Henry Quiñónez |
| 20 | MF | COL | Sherman Cárdenas |
| 21 | FW | ECU | Jhojan Julio |
| 22 | DF | BRA | Lucas Tagliapietra |
| 25 | GK | ECU | Daniel Viteri |
| 26 | MF | ECU | Anderson Julio |
| 27 | MF | ECU | Jonathan Betancourt |
| 29 | DF | ECU | Édison Carcelén |

1.Aníbal Chalá replaced Rubén Olivera for the second stage.
2.Jonathan González replaced Jairo Padilla for the second stage.
3.Lucas Tagliapietra replaced Gabriel Cevallos for the second stage.
4. Alejandro Villalva left the club.
5. Felipe Rodríguez left the club.
6. Fernando Guerrero left the club.

| Overall | | | | | | | | Home | | | | | | Away | | | | | |
| Pld | W | D | L | GF | GA | GD | Pts | W | D | L | GF | GA | GD | W | D | L | GF | GA | GD |
|---|---|---|---|---|---|---|---|---|---|---|---|---|---|---|---|---|---|---|---|
| 6 | 3 | 1 | 2 | 7 | 6 | +1 | 10 | 2 | 1 | 0 | 5 | 3 | +2 | 1 | 0 | 2 | 2 | 3 | −1 |

==== First stage ====
| February 28 First Stage | L.D.U. Quito (Ecuador) | 2–2 | (Uruguay) Defensor Sporting | Quito, Ecuador |
| 19:45 UTC−05:00 | Barcos 9' (pen.); Guerrero 87', (yellow card) 86'; Intriago (yellow card) 65'; Araujo (yellow card) 81' (yellow-red card) 85' | Report | Cardaccio 3', (yellow card) 16' (yellow-red card) 71'; Gómez 49'; Correa (yellow card) 47'; Zunino (yellow card) 57'; Rabuñál (yellow card) 86' | Stadium: Estadio Rodrigo Paz Delgado; Attendance: 17,535; Referee: Gery Vargas (Bolivia) |

| May 30 First Stage | Defensor Sporting (Uruguay) | 1–2 | (Ecuador) L.D.U. Quito | Montevideo, Uruguay |
| 21:45 UTC−03:00 | Cabrera 69', (red card) 77'; Cougo (yellow card) 42' | Report | Cangá 4'; Barcos 72', (yellow card) 13'; Narváez (yellow card) 16'; Olivera (yellow card) 34' (yellow-red card) 39'; Quiñónez (yellow card) 51'; Salaberry (yellow card) 82'; Bolaños (yellow card) 90+1' | Stadium: Estadio Centenario; Referee: Patricio Loustau (Argentina) |

LDU Quito won 4–3 on aggregate and advanced to the second stage.

==== Second stage ====
| July 12 Second Stage | Bolívar (Bolivia) | 1–0 | (Ecuador) L.D.U. Quito | La Paz, Bolivia |
| 18:15 UTC−04:00 | Barcos 52' (o.g.); Morales (yellow card) 88' | Report | Betancourt (yellow card) 32'; Narváez (yellow card) 51'; Barcos (yellow card) 55' | Stadium: Estadio Hernando Siles; Referee: Mauro Vigliano (Argentina) |

| August 2 Second Stage | L.D.U. Quito (Ecuador) | 1–0 (6–5 p) | (Bolivia) Bolívar | Quito, Ecuador |
| 17:15 UTC−05:00 | Salaberry 90+4' | Report | Arce (yellow card) 45+1'; Morales (yellow card) 70'; Fierro (yellow card) 80' | Stadium: Estadio Rodrigo Paz Delgado; Attendance: 17,031; Referee: Eber Aquino (Paraguay) |
| | Penalties |
| | Cárdenas (penalty scored); Cevallos (penalty scored); Salaberry (penalty missed); Anangonó (penalty scored); Barcos (penalty scored); Cangá (penalty scored); Intriago (penalty scored) | | (penalty scored) Arce; (penalty scored) Ferreira; (penalty scored) Riquelme; (penalty missed) Raldes; (penalty scored) Dituro; (penalty scored) Prieto; (penalty missed) Pedraza |

Tied 1–1 on aggregate, LDU Quito won on penalties and advanced to the round of 16 (Match F).

==== Round of 16 ====
| September 14 Round of 16 | Fluminense (Brazil) | 1–0 | (Ecuador) L.D.U. Quito | Rio de Janeiro, Brazil |
| 19:15 UTC−03:00 | Scarpa 6'; Dourado (yellow card) 39'; Wendel (yellow card) 51'; Frazan (yellow card) 67' | Report | González (yellow card) 25'; Chalá (yellow card) 35'; Betancourt (yellow card) 53'; Salaberry (yellow card) 68' | Stadium: Maracanã Stadium; Attendance: 42,270; Referee: Julio Quintana (Paraguay) |

| September 21 Round of 16 | L.D.U. Quito (Ecuador) | 2–1 | (Brazil) Fluminense | Quito, Ecuador |
| 17:15 UTC−05:00 | Barcos 57'; Cevallos 60'; Salaberry (yellow card) 42' | Report | Pedro 86', (yellow card) 87'; Orejuela (yellow card) 37' | Stadium: Estadio Rodrigo Paz Delgado; Attendance: 19,643; Referee: Fernando Rapallini (Argentina) |

Tied 2–2 on aggregate, Fluminense won on away goals and advanced to the quarterfinals.

== Player statistics ==
| Num | Pos | Player | App | Goal | Yellow card | Red card | App | Goal | Yellow card | Red card | App | Goal | Yellow card | Red card |
| Num | Pos | Player | Serie A | | | | Copa Sudamericana | | | | Total | | | |
|---|---|---|---|---|---|---|---|---|---|---|---|---|---|---|
| 1 | GF | Leonel Nazareno | 20 | — | 1 | — | 4 | — | — | — | 24 | — | 1 | — |
| 2 | DF | Norberto Araujo | 17 | — | 1 | 1 | 1 | — | — | 1 | 18 | — | 1 | 2 |
| 3 | DF | John Narváez | 31 | 1 | 10 | 1 | 6 | — | 2 | — | 37 | 1 | 12 | 1 |
| 4 | DF | Horacio Salaberry | 33 | 3 | 11 | 1 | 5 | 1 | 3 | — | 38 | 4 | 14 | 1 |
| 5 | MF | Jefferson Intriago | 33 | — | 13 | — | 6 | — | 1 | — | 39 | — | 14 | — |
| 6 | MF | Édison Vega | 38 | 1 | 10 | — | 6 | — | — | — | 44 | 1 | 10 | — |
| 7 | DF | Aníbal Chalá | 19 | — | 5 | — | 3 | — | 1 | — | 22 | — | 6 | — |
| 8 | MF | Fernando Hidalgo | 20 | — | 2 | — | 3 | — | — | — | 23 | — | 2 | — |
| 9 | FW | Ronie Carrillo | 8 | 1 | — | — | — | — | — | — | 8 | 1 | — | — |
| 10 | MF | Francisco Cevallos | 35 | 6 | 7 | — | 4 | 1 | — | — | 39 | 7 | 7 | — |
| 11 | MF | Jonathan González | 35 | — | 9 | — | 3 | — | 1 | — | 38 | — | 10 | — |
| 12 | GK | Erik Viveros | — | — | — | — | — | — | — | — | — | — | — | — |
| 13 | MF | William Ocles | 1 | 1 | — | — | — | — | — | — | 1 | 1 | — | — |
| 14 | DF | José Quintero | 16 | 2 | 4 | — | 2 | — | — | — | 18 | 2 | 4 | — |
| 16 | FW | Hernán Barcos | 36 | 21 | 10 | 1 | 6 | 3 | 2 | — | 42 | 24 | 12 | 1 |
| 17 | FW | Juan Luis Anangonó | 29 | 8 | 1 | — | 4 | — | — | — | 33 | 8 | 1 | — |
| 18 | MF | Álex Bolaños | 25 | 1 | 12 | 1 | 6 | — | 1 | — | 31 | 1 | 13 | 1 |
| 19 | DF | Henry Quiñónez | 9 | 1 | 4 | — | 2 | — | 1 | — | 11 | 1 | 5 | — |
| 20 | MF | Sherman Cárdenas | 19 | 2 | 1 | — | 2 | — | — | — | 21 | 2 | 1 | — |
| 21 | FW | Djorkaeff Reasco | 7 | 2 | — | — | — | — | — | — | 7 | 2 | — | — |
| 22 | DF | Lucas Tagliapietra | 19 | 2 | 1 | — | 2 | — | — | — | 21 | 2 | 1 | — |
| 25 | GK | Daniel Viteri | 24 | — | 1 | — | 2 | — | — | — | 26 | — | 1 | — |
| 26 | MF | Jhojan Julio | 22 | 3 | 4 | — | — | — | — | — | 22 | 3 | 4 | — |
| 27 | MF | Jonathan Betancourt | 35 | 6 | 6 | — | 4 | — | 2 | — | 39 | 6 | 8 | — |
| 29 | DF | Édison Carcelén | 8 | — | 2 | — | 2 | — | — | — | 10 | — | 2 | — |
| 31 | MF | Anderson Julio | 21 | 2 | 2 | 1 | 3 | — | — | — | 24 | 2 | 2 | 1 |
| 33 | DF | Luis Cangá | 14 | 1 | 1 | — | 3 | 1 | — | — | 17 | 2 | 1 | — |
| 7 | MF | Rubén Olivera | 12 | — | 5 | — | 2 | — | — | 1 | 14 | — | 5 | 1 |
| 20 | MF | Felipe Rodríguez | 11 | — | — | — | 1 | — | — | — | 12 | — | — | — |
| 23 | MF | Fernando Guerrero | 15 | — | 4 | — | 1 | 1 | 1 | — | 16 | 1 | 5 | — |
| 32 | FW | Hancel Batalla | 2 | — | — | — | — | — | — | — | 2 | — | — | — |
| Totals | | | — | 64 | 127 | 6 | — | 7 | 15 | 2 | — | 71 | 142 | 8 |

As of December 8, 2017

Note: Players in italics left the club mid-season.

== Team statistics ==
| | Total | Home | Away |
|---|---|---|---|
| Total Games played | 50 | 25 | 25 |
| Total Games won | 16 | 12 | 4 |
| Total Games drawn | 16 | 9 | 7 |
| Total Games lost | 18 | 4 | 14 |
| Games played (Serie A) | 44 | 22 | 22 |
| Games won (Serie A) | 13 | 10 | 3 |
| Games drawn (Serie A) | 15 | 8 | 7 |
| Games lost (Serie A) | 16 | 4 | 12 |
| Games played (CONMEBOL Sudamericana) | 6 | 3 | 3 |
| Games won (CONMEBOL Sudamericana) | 3 | 2 | 1 |
| Games drawn (CONMEBOL Sudamericana) | 1 | 1 | 0 |
| Games lost (CONMEBOL Sudamericana) | 2 | 0 | 2 |
| Biggest win (Serie A) | 5–0 vs Clan Juvenil | 5–0 vs Clan Juvenil | 3–1 vs Independiente del Valle; 3–1 vs Deportivo Cuenca |
| Biggest loss (Serie A) | 0–3 vs Universidad Católica; 1–4 vs Delfín; 0–3 vs El Nacional | 0–3 vs El Nacional | 0–3 vs Universidad Católica; 1–4 vs Delfín |
| Biggest win (CONMEBOL Sudamericana) | 2–1 vs Defensor Sporting; 1–0 vs Bolívar; 2–1 vs Fluminense | 1–0 vs Bolívar; 2–1 vs Fluminense | 2–1 vs Defensor Sporting |
| Biggest loss (CONMEBOL Sudamericana) | 0–1 vs Bolívar; 0–1 vs Fluminense | | 0–1 vs Bolívar; 0–1 vs Fluminense |
| Clean sheets | 9 | 7 | 2 |
| Goals scored | 73 | 51 | 22 |
| Goals conceded | 70 | 31 | 39 |
| Goal difference | +3 | +20 | -17 |
| Average GF per game | 1.46 | 2.04 | 0.88 |
| Average GA per game | 1.4 | 1.24 | 1.56 |
| Yellow cards | 142 | 57 | 85 |
| Red cards | 8 | 5 | 3 |
| Most appearances | (Ecuador) Édison Vega (44) | (Ecuador) Édison Vega (23) | (Ecuador) Édison Vega (21) |
| Most minutes played | (Ecuador) Édison Vega (3585) | (Ecuador) Édison Vega (1907) | (Argentina) Hernán Barcos (1679) |
| Top scorer | (Argentina) Hernán Barcos (24) | (Argentina) Hernán Barcos (16) | (Argentina) Hernán Barcos (8) |
| Worst discipline | (Ecuador) Norberto Araujo (2) (red card) | (Ecuador) Norberto Araujo (2) (red card) | (Argentina) Hernán Barcos (1) (red card) (9) (yellow card) |
| Penalties for | 3/7 (42.86%) | 2/4 (50%) | 1/3 (33.33%) |
| Penalties against | 8/9 (88.89%) | 2/3 (66.67%) | 6/6 (100%) |
| League Points | 54/132 (40.91%) | 38/66 (57.58%) | 16/66 (24.24%) |
| Winning rate | 32% | 48% | 16% |

As of December 8, 2017Source: See Competitive matches (above)
