= 2015 Copa América squads =

Squads for the Copa América football tournament in 2015

The 2015 Copa América was an international football tournament held in Chile from 11 June to 4 July 2015. All twelve national teams involved in the tournament were required to register a squad of 22 players, or 23 players if the team chose to have three goalkeepers; only players in these squads were eligible to take part in the tournament. Each nation's squad of players were given shirt numbers 1–23.

== Group A ==
=== Chile ===
The final 23-player squad was announced on 30 May 2015. On 5 June 2015, midfielder Edson Puch was ruled out of the tournament due to muscle tear, being replaced by Francisco Silva. José Pedro Fuenzalida also replaced the injured Carlos Carmona on 7 June 2015.

Head coach: (Argentina) Jorge Sampaoli

No.	Pos.	Player	Date of birth (age)	Caps	Goals	Club
1	GK	Claudio Bravo (captain)	13 April 1983 (aged 32)	89	0	(Royal Spanish Football Federation) Barcelona
2	DF	Eugenio Mena	18 July 1988 (aged 26)	34	3	(Brazilian Football Confederation) Cruzeiro
3	DF	Miiko Albornoz	30 November 1990 (aged 24)	5	1	(German Football Association) Hannover 96
4	DF	Mauricio Isla	12 June 1988 (aged 26)	59	2	(The Football Association) Queens Park Rangers
5	MF	Francisco Silva	11 February 1986 (aged 29)	17	0	(Royal Belgian Football Association) Club Brugge
6	MF	José Pedro Fuenzalida	22 February 1985 (aged 30)	26	1	(Argentine Football Association) Boca Juniors
7	FW	Alexis Sánchez	19 December 1988 (aged 26)	79	26	(The Football Association) Arsenal
8	MF	Arturo Vidal	22 May 1987 (aged 28)	63	9	(Italian Football Federation) Juventus
9	FW	Mauricio Pinilla	4 February 1984 (aged 31)	33	6	(Italian Football Federation) Atalanta
10	MF	Jorge Valdivia	19 October 1983 (aged 31)	61	6	(Brazilian Football Confederation) Palmeiras
11	FW	Eduardo Vargas	20 November 1989 (aged 25)	41	18	(The Football Association) Queens Park Rangers
12	GK	Paulo Garcés	2 August 1984 (aged 30)	1	0	(Football Federation of Chile) Colo-Colo
13	DF	José Manuel Rojas	3 June 1983 (aged 32)	23	1	(Football Federation of Chile) Universidad de Chile
14	MF	Matías Fernández	15 May 1986 (aged 29)	62	14	(Italian Football Federation) Fiorentina
15	DF	Jean Beausejour	3 June 1984 (aged 31)	65	6	(Football Federation of Chile) Colo-Colo
16	MF	David Pizarro	11 September 1979 (aged 35)	41	2	(Italian Football Federation) Fiorentina
17	DF	Gary Medel	3 August 1987 (aged 27)	73	6	(Italian Football Federation) Inter Milan
18	DF	Gonzalo Jara	29 August 1985 (aged 29)	75	3	(German Football Association) Mainz 05
19	MF	Felipe Gutiérrez	8 October 1990 (aged 24)	22	1	(Royal Dutch Football Association) Twente
20	MF	Charles Aránguiz	17 April 1989 (aged 26)	33	4	(Brazilian Football Confederation) Internacional
21	MF	Marcelo Díaz	30 December 1986 (aged 28)	31	1	(German Football Association) Hamburger SV
22	FW	Ángelo Henríquez	13 April 1994 (aged 21)	5	2	(Croatian Football Federation) Dinamo Zagreb
23	GK	Johnny Herrera	9 May 1981 (aged 34)	11	0	(Football Federation of Chile) Universidad de Chile

=== Mexico ===
The final 23-player squad was announced on 11 May 2015. On 26 May 2015, defender Miguel Ángel Herrera sustained an ankle injury and was ruled out of the tournament, being replaced by Juan Carlos Valenzuela.

Head coach: Miguel Herrera

No.	Pos.	Player	Date of birth (age)	Caps	Goals	Club
1	GK	José de Jesús Corona	26 January 1981 (aged 34)	35	0	(Mexican Football Federation) Cruz Azul
2	DF	Julio César Domínguez	8 November 1987 (aged 27)	10	0	(Mexican Football Federation) Cruz Azul
3	DF	Hugo Ayala	31 March 1987 (aged 28)	16	0	(Mexican Football Federation) UANL
4	DF	Rafael Márquez (captain)	13 February 1979 (aged 36)	124	15	(Italian Football Federation) Hellas Verona
5	MF	Juan Carlos Medina	22 August 1983 (aged 31)	8	0	(Mexican Football Federation) Atlas
6	MF	Javier Güémez	17 October 1991 (aged 23)	4	0	(Mexican Football Federation) Tijuana
7	FW	Jesús Manuel Corona	6 January 1993 (aged 22)	2	1	(Royal Dutch Football Association) Twente
8	MF	Marco Fabián	21 July 1989 (aged 25)	22	6	(Mexican Football Federation) Guadalajara
9	FW	Raúl Jiménez	5 May 1991 (aged 24)	29	6	(Royal Spanish Football Federation) Atlético Madrid
10	MF	Luis Montes	15 May 1986 (aged 29)	13	3	(Mexican Football Federation) León
11	MF	Javier Aquino	11 February 1990 (aged 25)	26	0	(Royal Spanish Football Federation) Rayo Vallecano
12	GK	Alfredo Talavera	18 September 1982 (aged 32)	16	0	(Mexican Football Federation) Toluca
13	DF	Carlos Salcedo	29 September 1993 (aged 21)	1	0	(Mexican Football Federation) Guadalajara
14	DF	Juan Carlos Valenzuela	15 May 1984 (aged 31)	19	1	(Mexican Football Federation) Atlas
15	DF	Gerardo Flores	5 February 1986 (aged 29)	8	0	(Mexican Football Federation) Cruz Azul
16	DF	Adrián Aldrete	14 June 1988 (aged 26)	16	0	(Mexican Football Federation) Santos Laguna
17	MF	Mario Osuna	20 August 1988 (aged 26)	1	0	(Mexican Football Federation) Querétaro
18	FW	Enrique Esqueda	19 April 1988 (aged 27)	8	1	(Mexican Football Federation) UANL
19	FW	Vicente Matías Vuoso	3 November 1981 (aged 33)	10	4	(Mexican Football Federation) Chiapas
20	FW	Eduardo Herrera	25 July 1988 (aged 26)	3	3	(Mexican Football Federation) UNAM
21	DF	George Corral	18 July 1990 (aged 24)	1	0	(Mexican Football Federation) Querétaro
22	DF	Efraín Velarde	15 April 1986 (aged 29)	6	0	(Mexican Football Federation) Monterrey
23	GK	Melitón Hernández	15 October 1982 (aged 32)	1	0	(Mexican Football Federation) Veracruz

=== Ecuador ===
The final 23-player squad was announced on 1 June 2015. On 1 June 2015, midfielder Michael Arroyo sustained an ankle injury and was ruled out of the tournament, being replaced by Pedro Larrea. On 3 June 2015, midfielder Antonio Valencia was ruled out of the tournament after undergoing urgent ankle surgery. On 11 June 2015, forward Jaime Ayoví was ruled out due to a muscle strain and was replaced by Daniel Angulo.

Head coach: (Bolivia) Gustavo Quinteros

No.	Pos.	Player	Date of birth (age)	Caps	Goals	Club
1	GK	Librado Azcona	18 January 1984 (aged 31)	0	0	(Ecuadorian Football Federation) Independiente del Valle
2	DF	Arturo Mina	8 October 1990 (aged 24)	2	0	(Ecuadorian Football Federation) Independiente del Valle
3	DF	Frickson Erazo	5 May 1988 (aged 27)	46	1	(Brazilian Football Confederation) Grêmio
4	DF	Juan Carlos Paredes	8 July 1987 (aged 27)	47	0	(The Football Association) Watford
5	MF	Renato Ibarra	20 January 1991 (aged 24)	23	0	(Royal Dutch Football Association) Vitesse
6	MF	Christian Noboa	9 April 1985 (aged 30)	51	3	(Hellenic Football Federation) PAOK
7	MF	Jefferson Montero	1 September 1989 (aged 25)	44	8	(The Football Association) Swansea City
8	FW	Miller Bolaños	1 June 1990 (aged 25)	2	1	(Ecuadorian Football Federation) Emelec
9	FW	Fidel Martínez	15 February 1990 (aged 25)	12	2	(Mexican Football Federation) UdeG
10	DF	Walter Ayoví (captain)	11 August 1979 (aged 35)	99	8	(Mexican Football Federation) Pachuca
11	MF	Juan Cazares	3 April 1992 (aged 23)	3	1	(Argentine Football Association) Banfield
12	GK	Esteban Dreer	11 November 1981 (aged 33)	0	0	(Ecuadorian Football Federation) Emelec
13	FW	Enner Valencia	4 November 1989 (aged 25)	17	11	(The Football Association) West Ham United
14	MF	Osbaldo Lastra	10 August 1983 (aged 31)	2	0	(Ecuadorian Football Federation) Emelec
15	MF	Pedro Quiñónez	4 March 1986 (aged 29)	11	0	(Ecuadorian Football Federation) Emelec
16	DF	Mario Pineida	6 July 1992 (aged 22)	2	0	(Ecuadorian Football Federation) Independiente del Valle
17	FW	Daniel Angulo	16 November 1986 (aged 28)	0	0	(Ecuadorian Football Federation) Independiente del Valle
18	DF	Óscar Bagüí	10 December 1982 (aged 32)	21	0	(Ecuadorian Football Federation) Emelec
19	MF	Pedro Larrea	21 May 1986 (aged 29)	0	0	(Ecuadorian Football Federation) LDU Loja
20	DF	John Narváez	12 June 1991 (aged 23)	0	0	(Ecuadorian Football Federation) Emelec
21	DF	Gabriel Achilier	23 March 1985 (aged 30)	25	0	(Ecuadorian Football Federation) Emelec
22	MF	Jonathan González	7 March 1995 (aged 20)	2	0	(Mexican Football Federation) UdeG
23	GK	Alexander Domínguez	5 June 1987 (aged 28)	25	0	(Ecuadorian Football Federation) LDU Quito

=== Bolivia ===
The final 23-player squad was announced on 1 June 2015.

Head coach: Mauricio Soria

No.	Pos.	Player	Date of birth (age)	Caps	Goals	Club
1	GK	Romel Quiñónez	25 June 1992 (aged 22)	7	0	(Bolivian Football Federation) Bolívar
2	DF	Miguel Ángel Hurtado	4 July 1985 (aged 29)	2	0	(Bolivian Football Federation) Blooming
3	MF	Alejandro Chumacero	22 April 1991 (aged 24)	21	1	(Bolivian Football Federation) The Strongest
4	DF	Leonel Morales	2 September 1988 (aged 26)	2	0	(Bolivian Football Federation) Blooming
5	DF	Ronald Eguino	20 February 1988 (aged 27)	8	0	(Bolivian Football Federation) Bolívar
6	MF	Danny Bejarano	3 January 1994 (aged 21)	8	0	(Bolivian Football Federation) Oriente Petrolero
7	FW	Alcides Peña	14 January 1989 (aged 26)	15	1	(Bolivian Football Federation) Oriente Petrolero
8	MF	Martin Smedberg-Dalence	10 May 1984 (aged 31)	1	0	(Swedish Football Association) IFK Göteborg
9	FW	Marcelo Moreno	18 June 1987 (aged 27)	49	12	(Chinese Football Association) Changchun Yatai
10	FW	Pablo Escobar	23 February 1979 (aged 36)	16	3	(Bolivian Football Federation) The Strongest
11	MF	Damián Lizio	30 June 1989 (aged 25)	2	1	(Football Federation of Chile) O'Higgins
12	GK	José Peñarrieta	18 November 1988 (aged 26)	0	0	(Bolivian Football Federation) Petrolero Yacuiba
13	MF	Damir Miranda	6 October 1985 (aged 29)	4	0	(Bolivian Football Federation) Bolívar
14	DF	Edemir Rodríguez	21 October 1984 (aged 30)	16	0	(Bolivian Football Federation) Bolívar
15	MF	Sebastián Gamarra	15 January 1997 (aged 18)	0	0	(Italian Football Federation) Milan
16	DF	Ronald Raldes (captain)	20 April 1981 (aged 34)	81	1	(Bolivian Football Federation) Oriente Petrolero
17	DF	Marvin Bejarano	6 March 1988 (aged 27)	20	0	(Bolivian Football Federation) Oriente Petrolero
18	FW	Ricardo Pedriel	1 September 1987 (aged 27)	15	3	(Turkish Football Federation) Mersin İdmanyurdu
19	MF	Wálter Veizaga	22 April 1986 (aged 29)	10	0	(Bolivian Football Federation) The Strongest
20	MF	Jhasmani Campos	10 May 1988 (aged 27)	27	2	(Bolivian Football Federation) Bolívar
21	DF	Cristian Coimbra	31 December 1988 (aged 26)	0	0	(Bolivian Football Federation) Blooming
22	DF	Edward Zenteno	5 December 1984 (aged 30)	15	0	(Bolivian Football Federation) Jorge Wilstermann
23	GK	Hugo Suárez	7 February 1982 (aged 33)	12	0	(Bolivian Football Federation) Blooming

== Group B ==
=== Argentina ===
The final 23-player squad was announced on 27 May 2015. The squad numbers were revealed on 7 June 2015.

Head coach: Gerardo Martino

No.	Pos.	Player	Date of birth (age)	Caps	Goals	Club
1	GK	Sergio Romero	22 February 1987 (aged 28)	58	0	(Italian Football Federation) Sampdoria
2	DF	Ezequiel Garay	10 October 1986 (aged 28)	26	0	(Russian Football Union) Zenit Saint Petersburg
3	DF	Facundo Roncaglia	10 February 1987 (aged 28)	4	0	(Italian Football Federation) Genoa
4	DF	Pablo Zabaleta	16 January 1985 (aged 30)	48	0	(The Football Association) Manchester City
5	MF	Fernando Gago	10 April 1986 (aged 29)	57	0	(Argentine Football Association) Boca Juniors
6	MF	Lucas Biglia	30 January 1986 (aged 29)	28	0	(Italian Football Federation) Lazio
7	MF	Ángel Di María	14 February 1988 (aged 27)	59	11	(The Football Association) Manchester United
8	MF	Roberto Pereyra	7 January 1991 (aged 24)	6	0	(Italian Football Federation) Juventus
9	FW	Gonzalo Higuaín	10 December 1987 (aged 27)	47	23	(Italian Football Federation) Napoli
10	FW	Lionel Messi (captain)	24 June 1987 (aged 27)	97	45	(Royal Spanish Football Federation) Barcelona
11	FW	Sergio Agüero	2 June 1988 (aged 27)	60	22	(The Football Association) Manchester City
12	GK	Nahuel Guzmán	10 February 1986 (aged 29)	3	0	(Mexican Football Federation) UANL
13	DF	Milton Casco	11 April 1988 (aged 27)	0	0	(Argentine Football Association) Newell's Old Boys
14	MF	Javier Mascherano (vice-captain)	8 June 1984 (aged 31)	111	3	(Royal Spanish Football Federation) Barcelona
15	DF	Martín Demichelis	20 December 1980 (aged 34)	44	2	(The Football Association) Manchester City
16	DF	Marcos Rojo	20 March 1990 (aged 25)	31	1	(The Football Association) Manchester United
17	DF	Nicolás Otamendi	12 February 1988 (aged 27)	19	1	(Royal Spanish Football Federation) Valencia
18	FW	Carlos Tevez	7 February 1984 (aged 31)	68	13	(Italian Football Federation) Juventus
19	MF	Éver Banega	29 June 1988 (aged 26)	28	4	(Royal Spanish Football Federation) Sevilla
20	MF	Erik Lamela	4 March 1992 (aged 23)	10	1	(The Football Association) Tottenham Hotspur
21	MF	Javier Pastore	20 June 1989 (aged 25)	18	1	(French Football Federation) Paris Saint-Germain
22	FW	Ezequiel Lavezzi	3 May 1985 (aged 30)	39	4	(French Football Federation) Paris Saint-Germain
23	GK	Mariano Andújar	30 July 1983 (aged 31)	11	0	(Italian Football Federation) Napoli
23*	GK	Agustín Marchesín	16 March 1988 (aged 27)	2	0	(Mexican Football Federation) Santos Laguna

Note: Mariano Andújar suffered an injured hand midway through the tournament, and Agustín Marchesín was called up to replace him on 22 June 2015. According to the regulations, once the competition starts, only the goalkeepers may be replaced due to injury.

=== Uruguay ===
The final 23-player squad was announced on 23 May 2015. The squad numbers were revealed on 5 June 2015.

Head coach: Óscar Tabárez

No.	Pos.	Player	Date of birth (age)	Caps	Goals	Club
1	GK	Fernando Muslera	16 June 1986 (aged 28)	67	0	(Turkish Football Federation) Galatasaray
2	DF	José Giménez	20 January 1995 (aged 20)	16	2	(Royal Spanish Football Federation) Atlético Madrid
3	DF	Diego Godín (captain)	16 February 1986 (aged 29)	87	4	(Royal Spanish Football Federation) Atlético Madrid
4	DF	Jorge Fucile	19 November 1984 (aged 30)	43	0	(Uruguayan Football Association) Nacional
5	MF	Carlos Sánchez	2 December 1984 (aged 30)	3	0	(Argentine Football Association) River Plate
6	DF	Álvaro Pereira	28 November 1985 (aged 29)	66	6	(Argentine Football Association) Estudiantes
7	MF	Cristian Rodríguez	30 September 1985 (aged 29)	83	8	(Italian Football Federation) Parma
8	FW	Abel Hernández	8 August 1990 (aged 24)	18	8	(The Football Association) Hull City
9	FW	Diego Rolán	24 March 1993 (aged 22)	6	1	(French Football Federation) Bordeaux
10	MF	Giorgian de Arrascaeta	1 May 1994 (aged 21)	4	0	(Brazilian Football Confederation) Cruzeiro
11	FW	Cristhian Stuani	12 October 1986 (aged 28)	19	4	(Royal Spanish Football Federation) Espanyol
12	GK	Rodrigo Muñoz	22 January 1982 (aged 33)	0	0	(Paraguayan Football Association) Libertad
13	DF	Gastón Silva	5 March 1994 (aged 21)	1	0	(Italian Football Federation) Torino
14	MF	Nicolás Lodeiro	21 March 1989 (aged 26)	36	3	(Argentine Football Association) Boca Juniors
15	MF	Guzmán Pereira	16 May 1991 (aged 24)	3	0	(Football Federation of Chile) Universidad de Chile
16	DF	Maxi Pereira	8 June 1984 (aged 31)	100	3	(Portuguese Football Federation) Benfica
17	MF	Egidio Arévalo	1 January 1982 (aged 33)	66	0	(Mexican Football Federation) UANL
18	DF	Mathías Corujo	8 May 1986 (aged 29)	6	0	(Football Federation of Chile) Universidad de Chile
19	DF	Sebastián Coates	7 October 1990 (aged 24)	16	1	(The Football Association) Sunderland
20	MF	Álvaro González	29 October 1984 (aged 30)	50	3	(Italian Football Federation) Torino
21	FW	Edinson Cavani	14 February 1987 (aged 28)	71	25	(French Football Federation) Paris Saint-Germain
22	FW	Jonathan Rodríguez	6 July 1993 (aged 21)	5	1	(Portuguese Football Federation) Benfica
23	GK	Martín Silva	25 March 1983 (aged 32)	6	0	(Brazilian Football Confederation) Vasco da Gama

=== Paraguay ===
The final 23-player squad was announced on 28 May 2015.

Head coach: (Argentina) Ramón Díaz

No.	Pos.	Player	Date of birth (age)	Caps	Goals	Club
1	GK	Justo Villar	30 June 1977 (aged 37)	107	0	(Football Federation of Chile) Colo-Colo
2	DF	Iván Piris	10 March 1989 (aged 26)	17	0	(Italian Football Federation) Udinese
3	DF	Marcos Cáceres	5 May 1986 (aged 29)	17	0	(Argentine Football Association) Newell's Old Boys
4	DF	Pablo Aguilar	2 April 1987 (aged 28)	17	4	(Mexican Football Federation) América
5	DF	Bruno Valdez	6 October 1992 (aged 22)	0	0	(Paraguayan Football Association) Cerro Porteño
6	DF	Miguel Samudio	24 August 1986 (aged 28)	22	1	(Mexican Football Federation) América
7	FW	Raúl Bobadilla	18 June 1987 (aged 27)	2	0	(German Football Association) FC Augsburg
8	FW	Lucas Barrios	13 November 1984 (aged 30)	25	6	(French Football Federation) Montpellier
9	FW	Roque Santa Cruz (captain)	16 August 1981 (aged 33)	104	30	(Mexican Football Federation) Cruz Azul
10	FW	Derlis González	23 March 1994 (aged 21)	8	1	(Swiss Football Association) Basel
11	FW	Édgar Benítez	8 November 1987 (aged 27)	40	6	(Mexican Football Federation) Toluca
12	GK	Antony Silva	27 February 1984 (aged 31)	7	0	(Colombian Football Federation) Independiente Medellín
13	MF	Richard Ortiz	22 May 1990 (aged 25)	15	4	(Mexican Football Federation) Toluca
14	DF	Paulo da Silva	1 February 1980 (aged 35)	120	2	(Mexican Football Federation) Toluca
15	MF	Víctor Cáceres	25 March 1985 (aged 30)	60	1	(Brazilian Football Confederation) Flamengo
16	MF	Osmar Molinas	3 May 1987 (aged 28)	8	0	(Paraguayan Football Association) Libertad
17	MF	Osvaldo Martínez	8 April 1986 (aged 29)	29	1	(Mexican Football Federation) América
18	FW	Nelson Valdez	28 November 1983 (aged 31)	67	12	(German Football Association) Eintracht Frankfurt
19	DF	Fabián Balbuena	23 August 1991 (aged 23)	2	0	(Paraguayan Football Association) Libertad
20	MF	Néstor Ortigoza	7 December 1984 (aged 30)	21	1	(Argentine Football Association) San Lorenzo
21	MF	Óscar Romero	4 July 1992 (aged 22)	10	1	(Argentine Football Association) Racing
22	MF	Eduardo Aranda	28 January 1985 (aged 30)	1	0	(Paraguayan Football Association) Olimpia
23	GK	Alfredo Aguilar	18 July 1988 (aged 26)	0	0	(Paraguayan Football Association) Guaraní

=== Jamaica ===
Head coach: (Germany) Winfried Schäfer

No.	Pos.	Player	Date of birth (age)	Caps	Goals	Club
1	GK	Duwayne Kerr	16 February 1987 (aged 28)	11	0	(Norwegian Football Federation) Sarpsborg 08
2	DF	Daniel Gordon	16 January 1985 (aged 30)	5	1	(German Football Association) Karlsruher SC
3	DF	Michael Hector	19 July 1992 (aged 22)	0	0	(The Football Association) Reading
4	DF	Wes Morgan	21 January 1984 (aged 31)	12	0	(The Football Association) Leicester City
5	MF	Lance Laing	28 February 1988 (aged 27)	4	0	(Canadian Soccer Association) FC Edmonton
6	FW	Deshorn Brown	22 December 1990 (aged 24)	9	2	(Norwegian Football Federation) Vålerenga
7	FW	Romeo Parkes	20 November 1990 (aged 24)	3	1	(Salvadoran Football Federation) Isidro Metapán
8	DF	Hughan Gray	25 March 1987 (aged 28)	11	0	(Jamaica Football Federation) Waterhouse
9	FW	Giles Barnes	5 August 1988 (aged 26)	2	1	(United States Soccer Federation) Houston Dynamo
10	MF	Jobi McAnuff	3 November 1981 (aged 33)	13	0	(The Football Association) Leyton Orient
11	FW	Darren Mattocks	2 September 1990 (aged 24)	22	8	(Canadian Soccer Association) Vancouver Whitecaps FC
12	GK	Dwayne Miller	14 July 1987 (aged 27)	34	0	(Swedish Football Association) Syrianska
13	FW	Dino Williams	31 March 1990 (aged 25)	8	0	(Jamaica Football Federation) Montego Bay United
14	FW	Allan Ottey	18 December 1992 (aged 22)	0	0	(Jamaica Football Federation) Montego Bay United
15	MF	Je-Vaughn Watson	22 October 1983 (aged 31)	41	1	(United States Soccer Federation) FC Dallas
16	MF	Joel Grant	26 August 1987 (aged 27)	10	1	(The Football Association) Yeovil Town
17	MF	Rodolph Austin (captain)	1 June 1985 (aged 30)	73	6	(The Football Association) Leeds United
18	FW	Simon Dawkins	1 December 1987 (aged 27)	8	2	(The Football Association) Derby County
19	DF	Adrian Mariappa	3 October 1986 (aged 28)	21	0	(The Football Association) Crystal Palace
20	DF	Kemar Lawrence	17 September 1992 (aged 22)	16	2	(United States Soccer Federation) New York Red Bulls
21	DF	Jermaine Taylor	14 January 1985 (aged 30)	80	0	(United States Soccer Federation) Houston Dynamo
22	MF	Garath McCleary	15 May 1987 (aged 28)	9	1	(The Football Association) Reading
23	GK	Ryan Thompson	7 January 1985 (aged 30)	3	0	(United States Soccer Federation) Pittsburgh Riverhounds

== Group C ==
=== Brazil ===
The final 23-player squad was announced on 5 May 2015. On 24 May 2015, goalkeeper Diego Alves sustained a knee injury and was ruled out of the tournament, being replaced by goalkeeper Neto. On 29 May 2015, defender Marcelo sustained a back injury and was ruled out of the tournament, being replaced by defender Geferson. On 2 June 2015, midfielder Luiz Gustavo was ruled out of the tournament due to pending surgery to correct a meniscus injury, being replaced by midfielder Fred. On 11 June 2015, Danilo was withdrawn from the squad after picking up an injury in Brazil's friendly match against Mexico. He was replaced by Dani Alves.

Head coach: Dunga

No.	Pos.	Player	Date of birth (age)	Caps	Goals	Club
1	GK	Jefferson	2 January 1983 (aged 32)	16	0	(Brazilian Football Confederation) Botafogo
2	DF	Dani Alves	6 May 1983 (aged 32)	79	6	(Royal Spanish Football Federation) Barcelona
3	DF	Miranda	7 September 1984 (aged 30)	15	0	(Royal Spanish Football Federation) Atlético Madrid
4	DF	David Luiz	22 April 1987 (aged 28)	47	3	(French Football Federation) Paris Saint-Germain
5	MF	Fernandinho	4 May 1985 (aged 30)	14	2	(The Football Association) Manchester City
6	DF	Filipe Luís	9 August 1985 (aged 29)	12	0	(The Football Association) Chelsea
7	MF	Douglas Costa	14 September 1990 (aged 24)	4	0	(Ukrainian Association of Football) Shakhtar Donetsk
8	MF	Elias	16 May 1985 (aged 30)	19	0	(Brazilian Football Confederation) Corinthians
9	FW	Diego Tardelli	10 May 1985 (aged 30)	9	3	(Chinese Football Association) Shandong Luneng
10	FW	Neymar (captain)	5 February 1992 (aged 23)	62	43	(Royal Spanish Football Federation) Barcelona
11	MF	Roberto Firmino	2 October 1991 (aged 23)	4	2	(German Football Association) 1899 Hoffenheim
12	GK	Neto	19 July 1989 (aged 25)	0	0	(Italian Football Federation) Fiorentina
13	DF	Marquinhos	14 May 1994 (aged 21)	4	0	(French Football Federation) Paris Saint-Germain
14	DF	Thiago Silva	22 September 1984 (aged 30)	54	3	(French Football Federation) Paris Saint-Germain
15	DF	Geferson	13 May 1994 (aged 21)	0	0	(Brazilian Football Confederation) Internacional
16	DF	Fabinho	23 October 1993 (aged 21)	0	0	(French Football Federation) Monaco
17	MF	Fred	5 March 1993 (aged 22)	2	0	(Ukrainian Association of Football) Shakhtar Donetsk
18	MF	Éverton Ribeiro	10 April 1989 (aged 26)	3	0	(United Arab Emirates Football Association) Al-Ahli
19	MF	Willian	9 August 1988 (aged 26)	20	4	(The Football Association) Chelsea
20	FW	Robinho	25 January 1984 (aged 31)	96	27	(Brazilian Football Confederation) Santos
21	MF	Philippe Coutinho	12 June 1992 (aged 22)	6	1	(The Football Association) Liverpool
22	MF	Casemiro	23 February 1992 (aged 23)	7	0	(Portuguese Football Federation) Porto
23	GK	Marcelo Grohe	13 January 1987 (aged 28)	0	0	(Brazilian Football Confederation) Grêmio

=== Colombia ===
The final 23-player squad was announced on 30 May 2015.

Head coach: (Argentina) José Pékerman

No.	Pos.	Player	Date of birth (age)	Caps	Goals	Club
1	GK	David Ospina	31 August 1988 (aged 26)	52	0	(The Football Association) Arsenal
2	DF	Cristián Zapata	30 September 1986 (aged 28)	31	0	(Italian Football Federation) Milan
3	DF	Pedro Franco	23 April 1991 (aged 24)	4	0	(Turkish Football Federation) Beşiktaş
4	DF	Santiago Arias	13 January 1992 (aged 23)	14	0	(Royal Dutch Football Association) PSV Eindhoven
5	MF	Edwin Valencia	29 March 1985 (aged 30)	15	0	(Brazilian Football Confederation) Santos
6	MF	Carlos Sánchez	6 February 1986 (aged 29)	54	0	(The Football Association) Aston Villa
7	DF	Pablo Armero	2 November 1986 (aged 28)	63	2	(Brazilian Football Confederation) Flamengo
8	MF	Edwin Cardona	8 December 1992 (aged 22)	4	1	(Mexican Football Federation) Monterrey
9	FW	Radamel Falcao (captain)	10 February 1986 (aged 29)	56	24	(The Football Association) Manchester United
10	MF	James Rodríguez	12 July 1991 (aged 23)	32	12	(Royal Spanish Football Federation) Real Madrid
11	MF	Juan Cuadrado	26 May 1988 (aged 27)	39	5	(The Football Association) Chelsea
12	GK	Camilo Vargas	1 September 1989 (aged 25)	4	0	(Colombian Football Federation) Atlético Nacional
13	DF	Darwin Andrade	11 February 1991 (aged 24)	2	0	(Royal Belgian Football Association) Standard Liège
14	DF	Carlos Valdés	22 May 1985 (aged 30)	16	2	(Uruguayan Football Association) Nacional
15	MF	Alexander Mejía	7 September 1988 (aged 26)	17	0	(Mexican Football Federation) Monterrey
16	FW	Víctor Ibarbo	19 May 1990 (aged 25)	12	1	(Italian Football Federation) Roma
17	FW	Carlos Bacca	8 September 1986 (aged 28)	17	7	(Royal Spanish Football Federation) Sevilla
18	DF	Juan Camilo Zúñiga	14 December 1985 (aged 29)	58	1	(Italian Football Federation) Napoli
19	FW	Teófilo Gutiérrez	28 May 1985 (aged 30)	38	14	(Argentine Football Association) River Plate
20	FW	Luis Muriel	18 April 1991 (aged 24)	5	1	(Italian Football Federation) Sampdoria
21	FW	Jackson Martínez	3 October 1986 (aged 28)	35	10	(Portuguese Football Federation) Porto
22	DF	Jeison Murillo	27 May 1992 (aged 23)	5	0	(Royal Spanish Football Federation) Granada
23	GK	Cristian Bonilla	2 June 1993 (aged 22)	0	0	(Colombian Football Federation) La Equidad

=== Peru ===
The final 23-player squad was announced on 25 May 2015. The squad numbers were revealed on 7 June 2015.

Head coach: (Argentina) Ricardo Gareca

No.	Pos.	Player	Date of birth (age)	Caps	Goals	Club
1	GK	Pedro Gallese	23 February 1990 (aged 25)	6	0	(Peruvian Football Federation) Juan Aurich
2	DF	Jair Céspedes	22 May 1984 (aged 31)	4	0	(Peruvian Football Federation) Juan Aurich
3	DF	Hansell Riojas	15 October 1991 (aged 23)	3	0	(Peruvian Football Federation) Universidad César Vallejo
4	DF	Pedro Requena	24 January 1991 (aged 24)	2	0	(Peruvian Football Federation) Universidad César Vallejo
5	DF	Carlos Zambrano	10 July 1989 (aged 25)	29	4	(German Football Association) Eintracht Frankfurt
6	MF	Juan Manuel Vargas	5 October 1983 (aged 31)	53	4	(Italian Football Federation) Fiorentina
7	MF	Paolo Hurtado	27 July 1990 (aged 24)	15	2	(Portuguese Football Federation) Paços de Ferreira
8	MF	Christian Cueva	23 November 1991 (aged 23)	7	0	(Peruvian Football Federation) Alianza Lima
9	FW	Paolo Guerrero	1 January 1984 (aged 31)	56	21	(Brazilian Football Confederation) Corinthians
10	FW	Jefferson Farfán	26 October 1984 (aged 30)	64	17	(German Football Association) Schalke 04
11	FW	Yordy Reyna	17 September 1993 (aged 21)	8	2	(German Football Association) RB Leipzig
12	GK	Diego Penny	22 April 1984 (aged 31)	14	0	(Peruvian Football Federation) Sporting Cristal
13	MF	Edwin Retamoso	23 February 1982 (aged 33)	11	0	(Peruvian Football Federation) Real Garcilaso
14	FW	Claudio Pizarro (captain)	3 October 1978 (aged 36)	76	19	(German Football Association) Bayern Munich
15	DF	Christian Ramos	4 November 1988 (aged 26)	39	1	(Peruvian Football Federation) Juan Aurich
16	MF	Carlos Lobatón	6 February 1980 (aged 35)	33	1	(Peruvian Football Federation) Sporting Cristal
17	DF	Luis Advíncula	2 March 1990 (aged 25)	41	0	(Portuguese Football Federation) Vitória de Setúbal
18	FW	André Carrillo	14 June 1991 (aged 23)	23	1	(Portuguese Football Federation) Sporting CP
19	DF	Yoshimar Yotún	7 April 1990 (aged 25)	39	1	(Swedish Football Association) Malmö FF
20	MF	Joel Sánchez	11 June 1989 (aged 26)	2	0	(Peruvian Football Federation) Universidad San Martín
21	MF	Josepmir Ballón	21 March 1988 (aged 27)	35	0	(Peruvian Football Federation) Sporting Cristal
22	MF	Carlos Ascues	6 June 1992 (aged 23)	6	5	(Peruvian Football Federation) Melgar
23	GK	Salomón Libman	25 February 1984 (aged 31)	6	0	(Peruvian Football Federation) Universidad César Vallejo

=== Venezuela ===
The final 23-player squad was announced on 1 June 2015.

Head coach: Noel Sanvicente

No.	Pos.	Player	Date of birth (age)	Caps	Goals	Club
1	GK	Alain Baroja	23 October 1989 (aged 25)	3	0	(Venezuelan Football Federation) Caracas
2	DF	Wilker Ángel	18 March 1993 (aged 22)	1	1	(Venezuelan Football Federation) Deportivo Táchira
3	DF	Andrés Túñez	15 March 1987 (aged 28)	11	0	(Football Association of Thailand) Buriram United
4	DF	Oswaldo Vizcarrondo	31 May 1984 (aged 31)	61	8	(French Football Federation) Nantes
5	DF	Fernando Amorebieta	29 March 1985 (aged 30)	12	1	(The Football Association) Middlesbrough
6	DF	Gabriel Cichero	25 April 1984 (aged 31)	56	4	(Venezuelan Football Federation) Mineros de Guayana
7	FW	Miku	19 August 1985 (aged 29)	50	10	(Royal Spanish Football Federation) Rayo Vallecano
8	MF	Tomás Rincón	13 January 1988 (aged 27)	58	0	(Italian Football Federation) Genoa
9	FW	Salomón Rondón	16 September 1989 (aged 25)	38	12	(Russian Football Union) Zenit Saint Petersburg
10	MF	Ronald Vargas	2 December 1986 (aged 28)	17	3	(Turkish Football Federation) Balıkesirspor
11	MF	César González	1 October 1982 (aged 32)	57	5	(Venezuelan Football Federation) Deportivo Táchira
12	GK	Dani Hernández	21 October 1985 (aged 29)	20	0	(Royal Spanish Football Federation) Tenerife
13	MF	Luis Manuel Seijas	23 June 1986 (aged 28)	53	2	(Colombian Football Federation) Santa Fe
14	MF	Franklin Lucena	20 February 1981 (aged 34)	58	2	(Venezuelan Football Federation) Deportivo La Guaira
15	MF	Alejandro Guerra	9 July 1985 (aged 29)	42	4	(Colombian Football Federation) Atlético Nacional
16	DF	Roberto Rosales	20 November 1988 (aged 26)	54	0	(Royal Spanish Football Federation) Málaga
17	FW	Josef Martínez	19 May 1993 (aged 22)	17	3	(Italian Football Federation) Torino
18	MF	Juan Arango (captain)	17 May 1980 (aged 35)	124	22	(Mexican Football Federation) Tijuana
19	MF	Rafael Acosta	13 February 1989 (aged 26)	9	0	(Venezuelan Football Federation) Mineros de Guayana
20	DF	Grenddy Perozo	28 February 1986 (aged 29)	45	2	(French Football Federation) Ajaccio
21	FW	Gelmin Rivas	23 March 1989 (aged 26)	3	0	(Venezuelan Football Federation) Deportivo Táchira
22	MF	Jhon Murillo	21 November 1995 (aged 19)	1	1	(Venezuelan Football Federation) Zamora
23	GK	Wuilker Faríñez	15 February 1998 (aged 17)	0	0	(Venezuelan Football Federation) Caracas
