= Álex Bolaños =

Ecuadorian footballer (born 1985)

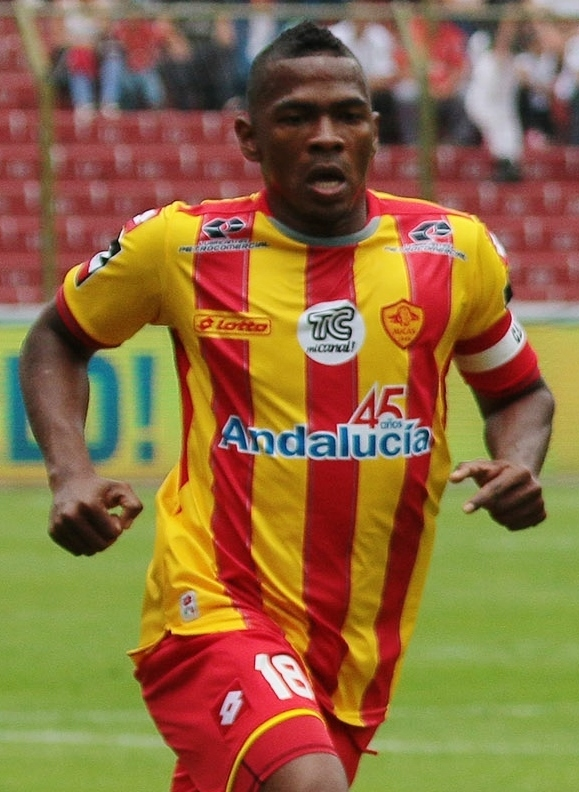
- Bolaños in 2015

Personal information
- Full name: Álexander Leonardo Bolaños Reascos
- Date of birth: January 22, 1985 (age 41)
- Place of birth: San Lorenzo, Ecuador
- Height: 1.79 m (5 ft 10 1/2 in)
- Position: Midfielder

Team information
- Current team: CD La Unión

Youth career
- 2005: Atlético Guayaquil
- 2005: Barcelona SC

Senior career*
Years	Team	Apps	(Gls)
2005–2008	Barcelona SC	67	(2)
2009	LDU Quito	0	(0)
2010	→ Universidad Católica (loan)	35	(1)
2011–2013	Deportivo Quito	71	(4)
2014–2015	Barcelona SC	34	(0)
2015	→ Olimpo (loan)	6	(0)
2015–2016	Aucas	25	(3)
2016	Santa Cruz	3	(0)
2016	Aucas	16	(0)
2017	LDU Quito	25	(1)
2018	Delfín	4	(0)
2018–2019	Fuerza Amarilla	13	(1)
2019	LDU Loja	0	(0)
2020–2021	Everest	0	(0)
2021–	CD La Unión	0	(0)

International career
2007–	Ecuador	10	(0)
- * Club domestic league appearances and goals as of 22:54, 10 July 2019 (UTC)

Alexander Leonardo Bolaños Reascos (born January 22, 1985) is an Ecuadorian who currently plays for CD La Unión as a footballer.

== Career ==
Bolaños began his career at Guayaquil-based club Barcelona in 2005 during the Clausura championship. He continued to play for the club until they released him as a result of his criminal case. After serving time in prison, he was signed by LDU Quito in the later half of 2009 as an emergency signing. Despite not making any league appearances in 2009 due to ineligibility, he played one match for the club during the 2009 Copa Sudamericana. Liga would go on to win the competition and give Bolaños his first piece of silverware. Due to a lack of possible playing time, LDU Quito loaned Bolaños to crosstown-team Universidad Católica for the 2010 season. For the 2011 season, he was signed by Deportivo Quito.

In June 2019, he joined LDU Loja.

== Family ==
Bolaños is the older brother of Miller Bolaños, a midfielder who plays for Grêmio.

== Criminal case ==
Bolaños was involved in a fatal car crash in which his car struck the vehicle of Fabricio Gerardo Quezada, who was killed in the crash. Bolaños was sentenced to seven years in prison for drunk driving and manslaughter. He was released in September 2009 after a successful appeal of his sentence.

== Honors ==
LDU Quito

- Copa Sudamericana: 2009
