= Horacio Salaberry =

Uruguayan footballer (born 1987)

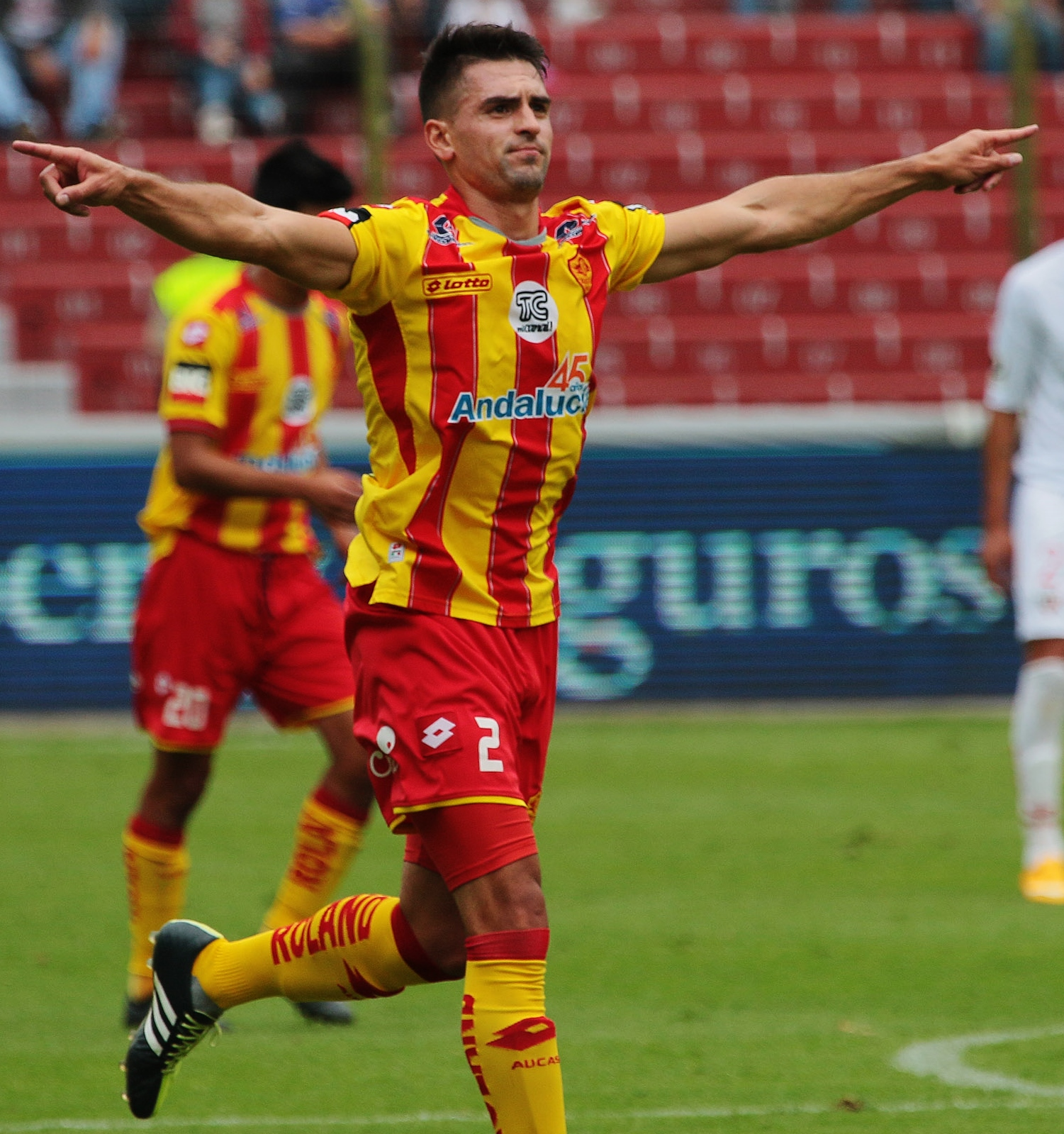
- Salaberry in 2015

Personal information
- Full name: Horacio David Salaberry Marrero
- Date of birth: April 3, 1987 (age 39)
- Place of birth: Colonia del Sacramento, Uruguay
- Height: 1.81 m (5 ft 11 in)
- Position: Defender

Team information
- Current team: Wanderers Durazno

Youth career
- –2009: Defensor Sporting

Senior career*
Years	Team	Apps	(Gls)
2008–2009	Defensor Sporting	0	(0)
2009–2010	→ Rentistas (loan)	3	(0)
2010–2012	Plaza Colonia	38	(5)
2012	Mushuc Runa	21	(4)
2013	Plaza Colonia	22	(2)
2014	L.D.U. Portoviejo	38	(6)
2015–2016	Aucas	48	(10)
2016	Santa Fe	10	(0)
2017–2019	L.D.U. Quito	44	(3)
2019–2025	River Plate	123	(4)
2021	→ Guayaquil City (loan)	15	(1)
2025–2026	Cerro	17	(0)
2026–	Wanderers Durazno	0	(0)
- * Club domestic league appearances and goals as of 15 March 2026

Horacio David Salaberry Marrero (born 3 April 1987) is a Uruguayan footballer. He currently plays for Uruguayan club Wanderers Durazno.

== Honours ==
LDU Quito

- Ecuadorian Serie A: 2018
