= Jonathan Betancourt =

Ecuadorian footballer (born 1995)

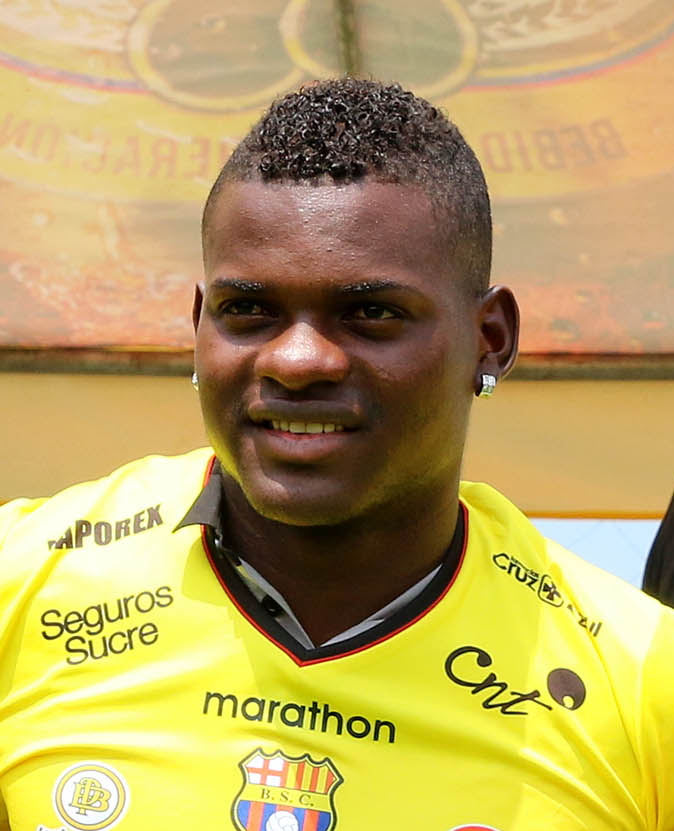

Personal information
- Full name: Jonathan Enrique Betancourt Mina
- Date of birth: 14 February 1995 (age 31)
- Place of birth: Esmeraldas, Ecuador
- Height: 1.74 m (5 ft 9 in)
- Positions: Midfielder; forward

Team information
- Current team: Deportivo Garcilaso
- Number: 11

Senior career*
Years	Team	Apps	(Gls)
2012	C.D. ESPOLI	28	(3)
2013–2014	FC Porto	0	(0)
2014–2015	Gondomar S.C.	15	(1)
2016	S.D. Aucas	30	(2)
2017	L.D.U. Quito	35	(6)
2018	Barcelona S.C.	28	(0)
2019–2020	C.D. Universidad Católica del Ecuador	18	(0)
2020–2021	Querétaro	12	(0)
2021	→ Cimarrones de Sonora (loan)	18	(4)
2021–2022	Dorados de Sinaloa	24	(5)
2022	Delfín S.C.	14	(0)
2023–	Deportivo Garcilaso	3	(0)
- * Club domestic league appearances and goals

Jonathan Enrique Betancourt Mina (born 14 February 1995, in Ecuador) is an Ecuadorian footballer who plays for Deportivo Garcilaso.

== Career ==
In 2013, Betancourt signed for Porto, one of Portugal's most successful clubs.

In 2014, he signed for Gondomar S.C. in the Portuguese third division.

For 2018, he signed for Barcelona S.C., Ecuador's most successful team.

In 2020, Betancourt was sent on loan to Querétaro in Mexico.
