= Kener Arce =

Ecuadorian footballer (born 1988)

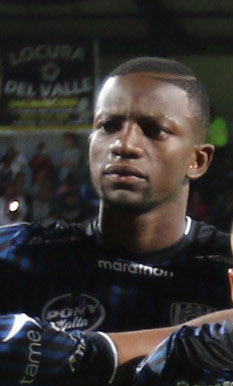
- Arce in 2017

Personal information
- Full name: Kener Luis Arce Caicedo
- Date of birth: 17 June 1988 (age 38)
- Place of birth: San Lorenzo, Ecuador
- Height: 1.78 m (5 ft 10 in)
- Position: Midfielder

Team information
- Current team: Cumbayá
- Number: 30

Youth career
- 2005–2006: ESPOLI

Senior career*
Years	Team	Apps	(Gls)
2006–2011	ESPOLI	81	(1)
2012	Olmedo	28	(0)
2013–2015	Liga de Loja	80	(1)
2016–2017	Fuerza Amarilla	38	(0)
2017–2018	Independiente del Valle	41	(1)
2019–2021	Macará	14	(0)
2020	→ Cuenca (loan)	4	(0)
2022–	Cumbayá		
- * Club domestic league appearances and goals as of 12:51, 13 August 2020 (UTC)

Kener Luis Arce Caicedo (born 17 June 1988) is an Ecuadorian professional footballer who plays for Ecuadorian Serie A side Cumbayá F.C. as a midfielder.
