= Óscar Bagüí =

Ecuadorian footballer (born 1982)

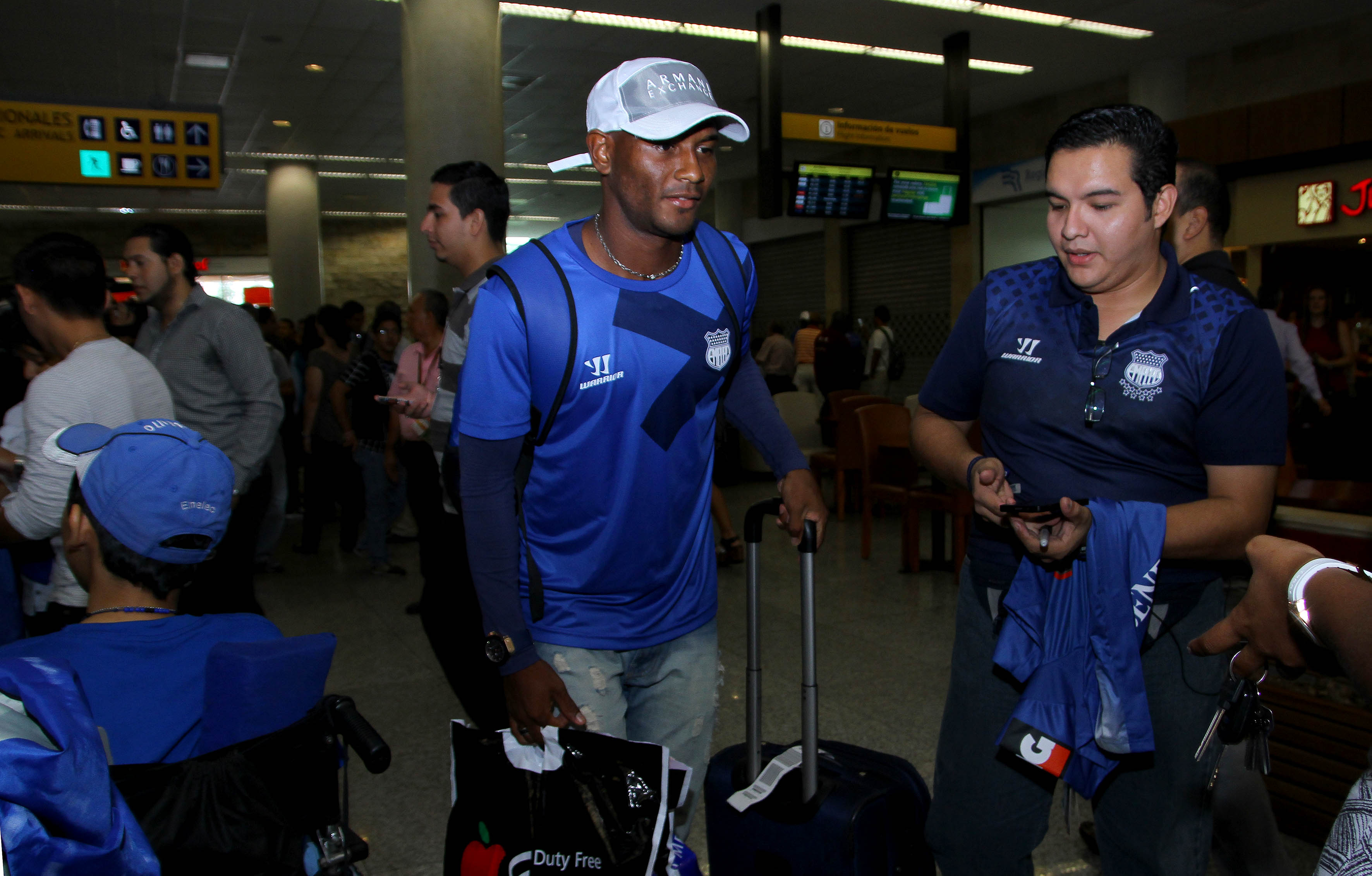

Personal information
- Full name: Óscar Dalmiro Bagüí Angulo
- Date of birth: December 10, 1982 (age 43)
- Place of birth: Eloy Alfaro, Ecuador
- Height: 1.73 m (5 ft 8 in)
- Position: Defender

Senior career*
Years	Team	Apps	(Gls)
2003–2007	Olmedo	176	(2)
2008–2009	Barcelona	63	(0)
2010–2011	Universidad Católica	41	(2)
2011-2021	Emelec	213	(2)

International career^{‡}
2005-2017	Ecuador	26	(0)
- * Club domestic league appearances and goals as of December 13, 2016 ‡ National team caps and goals as of August 31, 2017

Óscar Dalmiro Bagüí Angulo (Spanish pronunciation: [ˈoskaɾ βaˈɣwi]; born December 10, 1982, in Borbón, Esmeraldas Province) is an Ecuadorian former footballer who played as a defender.

== International career ==
Bagüí has earned 19 caps with the Ecuador national team. His first cap came on January 26, 2005, against Panama in Ambato. He was called up to play in the 2007 Copa América by coach Luis Fernando Suárez. He started in all three games for Ecuador as they were eliminated by Chile, Mexico, and Brazil. He continued to receive call-ups and caps for the team in 2007 during 2010 FIFA World Cup qualification. CS Emelec Serie A: 2013
