= John Narváez =

Ecuadorian footballer (born 1991)

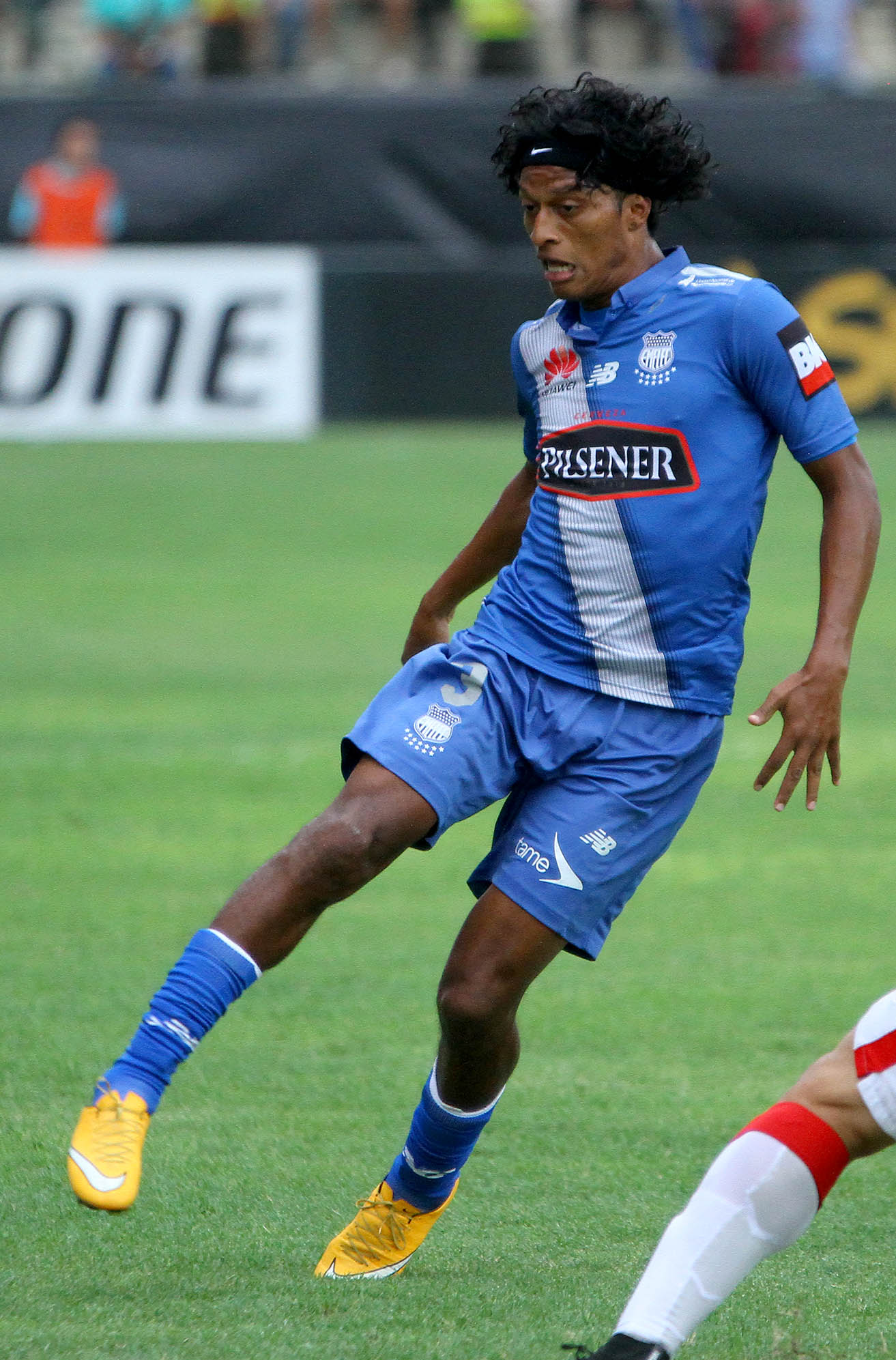

Personal information
- Full name: John Willian Narváez Arroyo
- Date of birth: 12 June 1991 (age 35)
- Place of birth: Esmeraldas, Ecuador
- Height: 1.81 m (5 ft 11 1/2 in)
- Position: Centre back

Team information
- Current team: ADT
- Number: 3

Youth career
- 2007: Piratas
- 2007–2009: Deportivo Cuenca

Senior career*
Years	Team	Apps	(Gls)
2009–2011	Deportivo Cuenca	67	(1)
2012–2016	Fénix	0	(0)
2012	→ El Nacional (loan)	24	(0)
2013–2015	→ Emelec (loan)	97	(2)
2016	Rocafuerte	0	(0)
2016–2017	LDU Quito	45	(2)
2018–2019	Melgar	52	(2)
2020	Macará	5	(0)
2021	Deportes Tolima	21	(1)
2022	Carlos A. Mannucci	28	(1)
2023	Guayaquil City	23	(0)
2024-	ADT	58	(1)

International career
2011–2012	Ecuador U20	12	(0)
2015–	Ecuador	2	(0)
- * Club domestic league appearances and goals as of 30 December 2025

John William Narváez Arroyo (born 12 June 1991) is an Ecuadorian footballer who plays for ADT as a centre back.

== Career ==
Born in Esmeraldas, Narváez began playing football with Deportivo Cuenca. He had a brief playthrough with El Nacional in 2012. He joined Ecuadorian Serie A side Club Sport Emelec in 2013, and featured regularly as the club won the 2013 tournament.

The defender played for Emelec in the 2014 Copa Libertadores.

== International career ==
Narváez is a Youth product of Deportivo Cuenca. He was part of the Ecuadorian squad which played at the 2011 South American U-20 Championship, qualifying 4th for the 2011 FIFA U-20 World Cup. The Squad went on to reach the Round of 16, being defeated by France.

Narváez was called up for the 2014 FIFA World Cup preliminary squad. He didn't make the cut to the final 23. He was once again called up for the 2015 Copa América making the cut for the final 23 this time around. He made his debut on 6 June 2015 against Panama coming in as a sub for Jefferson Montero.

== Honours ==
Emelec

- Serie A: 2013, 2014, 2015
