= Jonathan González (footballer, born 1995) =

Ecuadorian footballer (1995–2025)

Personal information
- Full name: Jonathan David González Valencia
- Date of birth: 3 July 1995
- Place of birth: Quinindé, Ecuador
- Date of death: 19 September 2025 (aged 30)
- Place of death: Esmeraldas Province, Ecuador
- Height: 1.74 m (5 ft 9 in)
- Position: Winger

Youth career
- –2010: Norte América
- 2010–2012: Independiente DV

Senior career*
Years	Team	Apps	(Gls)
2011–2014	Independiente DV	87	(14)
2015	Leones Negros	17	(2)
2015–2017	León	12	(0)
2016	→ Independiente DV (loan)	22	(1)
2017	Olimpia	1	(0)
2017	LDU Quito	35	(0)
2019	Deportivo Cuenca	23	(4)
2020	Dorados de Sinaloa	3	(0)
2020	Delfín	5	(1)
2021	S.D. Aucas	1	(0)
2022	Mushuc Runa	1	(0)

International career
2014–2015	Ecuador	4	(0)
- * Club domestic league appearances and goals

Jonathan David González Valencia (3 July 1995 – 19 September 2025) was an Ecuadorian footballer, commonly known as "Speedy Gonzalez", who played in the Ecuadorian Serie A as a winger.

== Club career ==
González was a youth exponent from Independiente del Valle. He made his debut for Independiente del Valle in Ecuadorian Serie A in 2011.

== International career ==
González was called for Friendlies against United States and El Salvador on 10 and 14 October 2014 respectively. Gonzalez came in as a sub for Renato Ibarra and made his debut for Ecuador against the United States.

== Death ==
González was fatally shot by an unidentified suspect in Esmeraldas Province, Ecuador on 19 September 2025, at the age of 30. The perpetrator was then surrounded by the National Police of Ecuador, as they have arrested the suspect and taken into custody with all charges of murder.
