= Esteban Dreer =

Argentine-born Ecuadorian footballer (born 1981)

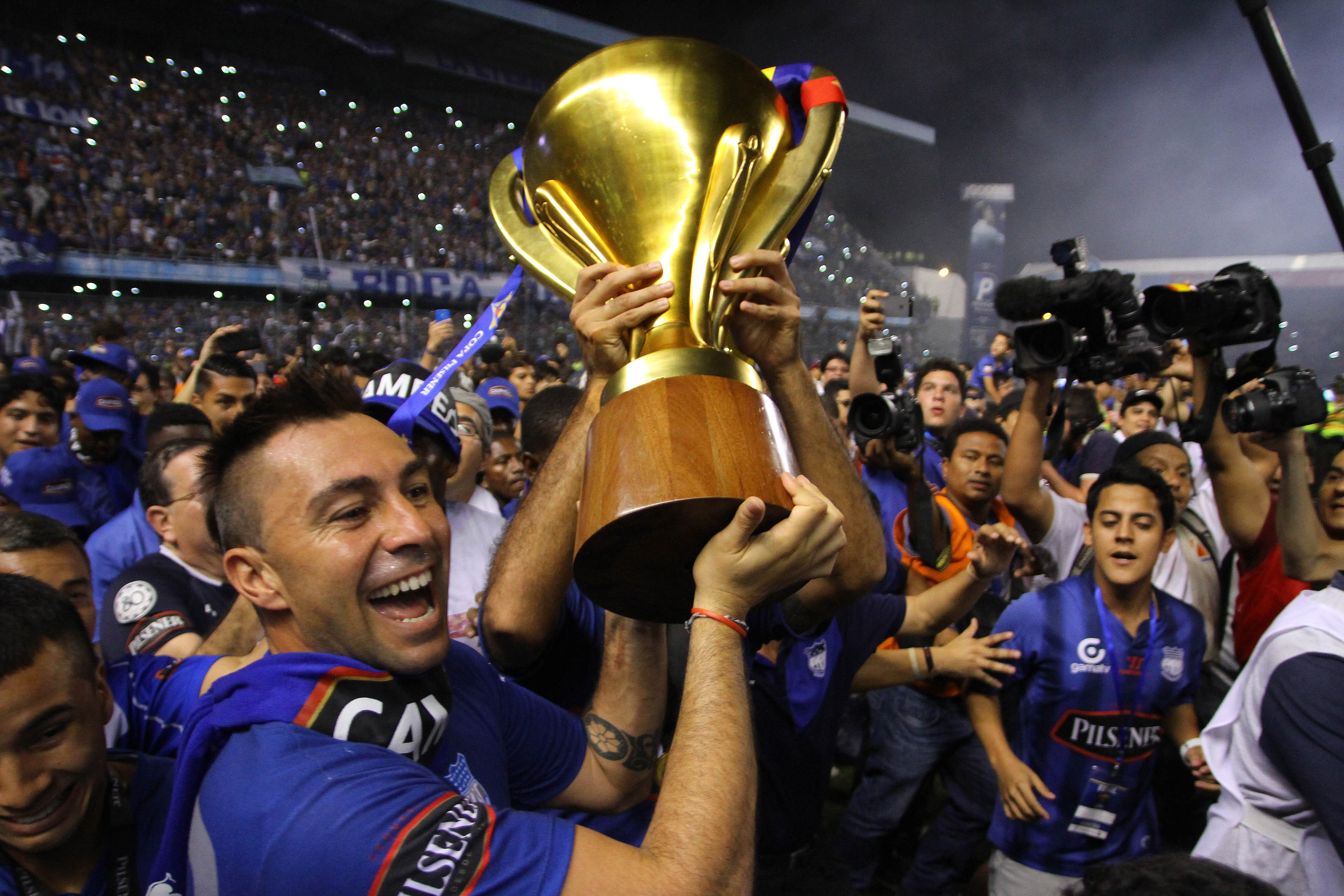

Personal information
- Full name: Esteban Javier Dreer Gianneschi
- Date of birth: November 11, 1981 (age 45)
- Place of birth: Godoy Cruz, Mendoza Province, Argentina
- Height: 1.85 m (6 ft 1 in)
- Position: Goalkeeper

Youth career
- 2002: Arsenal de Sarandí
- 2002–2003: Deportivo Santamarina

Senior career*
Years	Team	Apps	(Gls)
2003–2007	Arsenal de Sarandí	14	(0)
2007–2009	FBK Kaunas	11	(0)
2009–2012	Deportivo Cuenca	103	(0)
2012–2019	Emelec	280	(0)
2020–2021	LDU Portoviejo	5	(0)

International career
2015–2017	Ecuador	12	(0)
- * Club domestic league appearances and goals as of 13:04, 29 July 2021 (UTC)

Esteban Javier Dreer Gianneschi (born November 11, 1981, in Godoy Cruz) is an Argentine-born naturalised Ecuadorian former footballer who played as a goalkeeper.

In May 2011, Dreer set an Ecuadorian Serie A record for most consecutive games played by a goalkeeper. Since 29 November 2009, Dreer has consecutively played 5,700 minutes in 63 matches.

== International career ==
Argentine-born Dreer has played football in Ecuador spanning back to 2009 with Deportivo Cuenca. He became a naturalized Ecuadorian citizen and became eligible for the Ecuador national football team. He made the cut for the final 23 squad for 2015 Copa América.

Dreer made his debut on November 17, 2015, in a 2018 FIFA World Cup Qualifier against Venezuela.
