= 2024 LigaPro Serie A =

LigaPro Serie A
- Season: 2024
- Dates: 1 March – 14 December 2024
- Champions: LDU Quito (13th title)
- Relegated: Imbabura; Cumbayá
- Copa Libertadores: LDU Quito; Independiente del Valle; Barcelona; El Nacional (via Copa Ecuador)
- Copa Sudamericana: Universidad Católica; Aucas; Mushuc Runa; Orense
- Matches: 242
- Goals: 628 (2.6 per match)
- Top goalscorer: Álex Arce (28 goals)
- Biggest home win: Barcelona 8–1 Cumbayá (10 November); Ind. del Valle 7–0 Macará (24 November)
- Biggest away win: Imbabura 0–6 T. Universitario (28 October)
- Highest scoring: Delfín 6–4 Cumbayá (30 November)

The 2024 Campeonato Ecuatoriano de Fútbol Serie A, officially known as the LigaPro Ecuabet 2024 for sponsoring purposes, was the 66th season of the Serie A, Ecuador's top tier football league, and the sixth under the management of the Liga Profesional de Fútbol del Ecuador (or LigaPro). The season was originally scheduled to begin on 16 February 2024, but it was postponed for two weeks to 1 March due to the security conditions derived from the 2024 Ecuadorian conflict, and ended on 14 December 2024. The fixtures for the season were announced on 23 January 2024.

The defending champions LDU Quito won their thirteenth league title in this season, defeating Independiente del Valle in the finals by a 3–1 aggregate score.

== Teams ==
16 teams competed in the season. Gualaceo and Guayaquil City were relegated after finishing in the bottom two places of the aggregate table of the previous season, being replaced by the 2023 Serie B champions Macará and runners-up Imbabura. Macará clinched promotion to the top flight with five matches to go after defeating Vargas Torres 2–0 on 21 September 2023, making an immediate return to top flight, whilst Imbabura ensured promotion in the last round played on 26 October, with a 4–0 victory over Macará, returning to the top flight after a 12-year absence.

=== Stadia and locations ===
Locations of the 2024 Serie A clubs.

Team	City	Stadium	Capacity
Aucas	Quito	Cooprogreso Gonzalo Pozo Ripalda	21,689
Barcelona	Guayaquil	Monumental Banco Pichincha	57,267
Cumbayá	Quito	Olímpico Atahualpa	35,258
Delfín	Manta	Jocay	21,000
Deportivo Cuenca	Cuenca	Banco del Austro Alejandro Serrano Aguilar	18,549
El Nacional	Quito	Olímpico Atahualpa	35,258
Emelec	Guayaquil	George Capwell Banco del Austro	40,020
Imbabura	Ibarra	Olímpico de Ibarra	18,600
Independiente del Valle	Quito	Banco Guayaquil	12,000
LDU Quito	Quito	Rodrigo Paz Delgado	41,575
Libertad	Loja	Reina del Cisne	14,935
Macará	Ambato	Bellavista Universidad Indoamérica	16,467
Mushuc Runa	Ambato	COAC Mushuc Runa	8,200
Orense	Machala	Banco de Machala 9 de Mayo	16,456
Técnico Universitario	Ambato	Bellavista Universidad Indoamérica	16,467
Universidad Católica	Quito	Olímpico Atahualpa	35,258

=== Personnel and kits ===
Team	Manager	Kit manufacturer	Shirt sponsor
Aucas	(Argentina) Gabriel Pereyra	Jasa Evolution	Lotería Nacional
Barcelona	(Ecuador) Segundo Castillo	Marathon	Pilsener
Cumbayá	(Ecuador) Diego Chamorro	Lotto	Marsbet
Delfín	(Ecuador) Javier Carvajal	Baldo's	La Esquina de Ales
Deportivo Cuenca	(Ecuador) Norberto Araujo	Lotto	Ecuabet, Banco del Austro, Chubb Seguros
El Nacional	(Argentina) Marcelo Zuleta	Lotto	ANDEC, Banco General Rumiñahui, Gana Play
Emelec	(Colombia) Leonel Álvarez	Adidas	Ecuabet
Imbabura	(Ecuador) Josué Salazar	Ortiz Design	Fábrica de Medias Gardenia
Independiente del Valle	(Argentina) Javier Gandolfi	Marathon	Ecuabet, Banco Guayaquil, Toyota
LDU Quito	(Argentina) Pablo Sánchez	Puma	Banco Pichincha
Libertad	(Ecuador) Juan Carlos León	Jasa Evolution	Banco de Loja, Grand Aviation
Macará	(Spain) Alex Pallarés	Boman	Universidad Indoamérica, GanaPlay
Mushuc Runa	(Paraguay) Ever Almeida	Boman	Cooperativa Mushuc Runa
Orense	(Colombia) Santiago Escobar	Elohim	Banco de Machala, IncarPalm
Técnico Universitario	(Ecuador) Paúl Vélez	Vaz Sport	Cooperativa San Francisco Ltda.
Universidad Católica	(Argentina) Jorge Célico	Umbro	Banco Pichincha

=== Managerial changes ===
Team	Outgoing manager	Manner of departure	Date of vacancy	Position in table	Incoming manager	Date of appointment
First stage
Macará	(Ecuador) Boris Fiallos	Mutual agreement	30 October 2023	Pre-season	(Spain) Alex Pallarés	21 November 2023
Cumbayá	(Ecuador) Leonardo Vanegas	End of contract	2 December 2023	Pre-season	(Ecuador) Norberto Araujo	27 December 2023
Orense	(Ecuador) Juan Carlos León	End of contract	3 December 2023	Pre-season	(Argentina) Nicolás Chietino	18 December 2023
Universidad Católica	(Spain) Igor Oca	End of contract	5 December 2023	Pre-season	(Argentina) Jorge Célico	5 December 2023
Deportivo Cuenca	(Argentina) Carlos Ischia	End of contract	5 December 2023	Pre-season	(Argentina) Luis García	22 December 2023
Independiente del Valle	(Argentina) Martín Anselmi	Resigned	17 December 2023	Pre-season	(Argentina) Javier Gandolfi	20 December 2023
Aucas	(Colombia) Santiago Escobar	Mutual agreement	19 December 2023	Pre-season	(Mexico) Gerardo Espinoza	26 December 2023
LDU Quito	(Argentina) Luis Zubeldía	End of contract	4 January 2024	Pre-season	(Spain) Josep Alcácer	8 January 2024
Técnico Universitario	(Colombia) Juan Pablo Buch	Mutual agreement	19 March 2024	11th	(Colombia) Dayron Montesino (Note: Caretaker manager.)	19 March 2024
Técnico Universitario	(Colombia) Dayron Montesino	End of caretaker spell	31 March 2024	12th	(Ecuador) Paúl Vélez	31 March 2024
Deportivo Cuenca	(Argentina) Luis García	Mutual agreement	7 April 2024	14th	(Ecuador) Jerson Stacio	7 April 2024
Libertad	(Ecuador) Geovanny Cumbicus	Sacked	19 April 2024	16th	(Ecuador) Juan Carlos León	19 April 2024
Barcelona	(Uruguay) Diego López	Sacked	19 April 2024	6th	(Argentina) Ariel Holan (Note: Germán Corengia was the caretaker manager for the 2024 Copa Libertadores group stage matchday 3 and the first stage 10th round match against Emelec.)	22 April 2024
El Nacional	(Paraguay) Ever Almeida	Sacked	19 April 2024	9th	(Argentina) Marcelo Zuleta	22 April 2024
Deportivo Cuenca	(Ecuador) Jerson Stacio	End of caretaker spell	22 April 2024	15th	(Spain) Igor Oca	22 April 2024
Mushuc Runa	(Ecuador) Renato Salas	Sacked	27 April 2024	11th	(Paraguay) Ever Almeida	28 April 2024
Orense	(Argentina) Nicolás Chietino	Mutual agreement	5 May 2024	11th	(Colombia) Santiago Escobar	5 May 2024
Delfín	(Argentina) Guillermo Duró	Sacked	9 May 2024	15th	(Colombia) Juan Pablo Buch	9 May 2024
LDU Quito	(Spain) Josep Alcácer	Mutual agreement	23 May 2024	4th	(Ecuador) Patricio Hurtado	23 May 2024
Cumbayá	(Ecuador) Norberto Araujo	Resigned	26 May 2024	14th	(Argentina) Lucas García	26 May 2024
Emelec	(Colombia) Hernán Torres	Mutual agreement	1 June 2024	5th	(Colombia) Leonel Álvarez	17 June 2024
Second stage
Imbabura	(Ecuador) Joe Armas	Resigned	18 June 2024	Pre-tournament	(Argentina) Martín Wainer	8 July 2024
LDU Quito	(Ecuador) Patricio Hurtado	End of caretaker spell	19 June 2024	Pre-tournament	(Argentina) Pablo Sánchez	19 June 2024
Aucas	(Mexico) Gerardo Espinoza	Resigned	1 July 2024	Pre-tournament	(Argentina) Jorge Alfonso	4 July 2024
Deportivo Cuenca	(Spain) Igor Oca	Mutual agreement	18 July 2024	Pre-tournament	(Argentina) Andrés Carevic	24 July 2024
Cumbayá	(Argentina) Lucas García	End of caretaker spell	29 July 2024	Pre-tournament	(Colombia) Armando Osma	29 July 2024
Aucas	(Argentina) Jorge Alfonso	End of caretaker spell	6 August 2024	15th	(Argentina) Sebastián Blázquez	6 August 2024
Imbabura	(Argentina) Martín Wainer	Sacked	29 August 2024	12th	(Ecuador) Galo Rodríguez (Note: Brandon Salazar was the caretaker manager for the second stage 5th round match against Cumbayá.)	31 August 2024
Deportivo Cuenca	(Argentina) Andrés Carevic	Mutual agreement	2 September 2024	16th	(Ecuador) Norberto Araujo	5 September 2024
Aucas	(Argentina) Sebastián Blázquez	Sacked	11 September 2024	15th	(Argentina) Gabriel Pereyra	11 September 2024
Delfín	(Colombia) Juan Pablo Buch	Sacked	16 September 2024	10th	(Ecuador) Javier Carvajal	19 September 2024
Cumbayá	(Colombia) Armando Osma	Sacked	27 September 2024	16th	(Ecuador) Juan Carlos Carrión	27 September 2024
Cumbayá	(Ecuador) Juan Carlos Carrión	End of caretaker spell	4 October 2024	15th	(Ecuador) Diego Chamorro	4 October 2024
Barcelona	(Argentina) Ariel Holan	Mutual agreement	10 October 2024	9th	(Ecuador) Segundo Castillo	10 October 2024
Imbabura	(Ecuador) Galo Rodríguez	Sacked	3 November 2024	13th	(Ecuador) Josué Salazar	3 November 2024

== First stage ==
The first stage began on 1 March and ended on 2 June 2024.

=== Standings ===
Pos	Team	Pld	W	D	L	GF	GA	GD	Pts	Qualification
1	Independiente del Valle	15	10	5	0	23	8	+15	35	Advance to Finals and qualification for Copa Libertadores group stage
2	Barcelona	15	9	4	2	24	8	+16	31	
3	LDU Quito	15	9	3	3	27	17	+10	30	
4	Aucas	15	8	5	2	31	18	+13	29	
5	Universidad Católica	15	7	4	4	31	20	+11	25	
6	Emelec	15	6	7	2	17	12	+5	25	
7	El Nacional (Note: El Nacional were deducted three points as punishment for outstanding debts.)	15	8	0	7	17	16	+1	21	
8	Mushuc Runa	15	5	3	7	18	19	−1	18	
9	Macará	15	4	6	5	11	13	−2	18	
10	Deportivo Cuenca	15	3	7	5	25	24	+1	16	
11	Técnico Universitario	15	4	4	7	14	21	−7	16	
12	Orense	15	3	6	6	10	17	−7	15	
13	Cumbayá	15	4	2	9	8	19	−11	14	
14	Imbabura	15	3	4	8	17	29	−12	13	
15	Delfín	15	2	3	10	8	23	−15	9	
16	Libertad (Note: Libertad were deducted four points as punishment for the involvement of two of their players in match-fixing and illegal betting during the previous season.)	15	1	5	9	8	25	−17	4	

Source: LigaPro, Soccerway
Rules for classification: 1) Points, 2) Goal difference, 3) Goals for, 4) Away goals for, 5) Head-to-head record, 6) Drawing of lots.

=== Results ===
Home \ Away	AUC	BSC	CUM	DEL	CUE	NAC	EME	IMB	IDV	LDQ	LIB	MAC	MUS	ORE	TEC	CAT
Aucas	—	—	3–0	—	—	3–4	3–1	2–2	—	—	2–0	—	—	2–0	3–1	2–2
Barcelona	1–1	—	—	—	4–0	1–0	—	2–0	—	2–0	—	—	—	0–0	3–0	—
Cumbayá	—	0–1	—	1–0	—	1–0	—	—	—	1–3	0–0	1–0	2–1	—	—	—
Delfín	2–0	1–3	—	—	—	—	—	—	0–1	—	1–1	1–1	—	0–1	2–0	0–2
Deportivo Cuenca	3–3	—	2–1	0–0	—	—	1–2	5–2	—	2–2	—	1–1	5–0	—	—	—
El Nacional	—	—	—	1–0	2–1	—	0–1	2–0	1–2	1–2	—	—	1–0	—	—	—
Emelec	—	1–1	2–0	2–0	—	—	—	—	0–0	—	0–0	0–1	0–0	—	—	2–1
Imbabura	—	—	0–0	3–0	—	—	1–2	—	0–1	—	4–2	0–1	—	—	—	2–2
Independiente del Valle	1–1	3–1	3–0	—	1–0	—	—	—	—	1–1	3–0	—	2–1	1–0	—	—
LDU Quito	1–2	—	—	2–1	—	—	2–2	5–0	—	—	—	2–1	—	—	1–0	2–1
Libertad	—	0–3	—	—	0–0	0–2	—	—	—	2–3	—	—	—	1–1	1–0	0–1
Macará	0–2	1–1	—	—	—	1–0	—	—	0–1	—	3–0	—	0–0	0–0	—	—
Mushuc Runa	0–2	1–0	—	5–0	—	—	—	3–0	—	0–1	2–1	—	—	—	1–2	2–1
Orense	—	—	1–0	—	1–1	0–1	1–1	1–2	—	1–0	—	—	2–2	—	—	—
Técnico Universitario	—	—	1–0	—	2–1	1–2	1–1	1–1	1–1	—	—	1–1	—	1–0	—	—
Universidad Católica	—	0–1	2–1	—	3–3	3–0	—	—	2–2	—	—	3–0	—	5–1	3–2	—

Source: LigaPro, Soccerway
Legend: Blue = home team win; Yellow = draw; Red = away team win.

== Second stage ==
The second stage began on 2 August and ended on 1 December 2024.

=== Standings ===
Pos	Team	Pld	W	D	L	GF	GA	GD	Pts	Qualification
1	LDU Quito	15	11	2	2	33	14	+19	35	Advance to Finals and qualification for Copa Libertadores group stage
2	Independiente del Valle	15	9	3	3	33	14	+19	30	
3	Universidad Católica	15	8	2	5	28	24	+4	26	
4	Barcelona	15	7	4	4	30	21	+9	25	
5	Orense	15	7	4	4	18	16	+2	25	
6	Mushuc Runa	15	5	8	2	27	24	+3	23	
7	Libertad	15	6	5	4	20	18	+2	23	
8	Técnico Universitario	15	6	4	5	25	15	+10	22	
9	Delfín	15	6	4	5	21	22	−1	22	
10	El Nacional	15	5	4	6	16	20	−4	19	
11	Aucas	15	4	4	7	16	22	−6	16	
12	Macará	15	4	3	8	15	27	−12	15	
13	Deportivo Cuenca (Note: Deportivo Cuenca were deducted three points as punishment for delayed debt payments.)	15	4	4	7	15	21	−6	13	
14	Imbabura	15	3	2	10	17	31	−14	11	
15	Cumbayá	15	2	4	9	17	34	−17	10	
16	Emelec (Note: Emelec were deducted three points as punishment for delayed debt payments.)	15	3	3	9	12	20	−8	9	

Source: LigaPro, Soccerway
Rules for classification: 1) Points, 2) Goal difference, 3) Goals for, 4) Away goals for, 5) Head-to-head record, 6) Drawing of lots.

=== Results ===
Home \ Away	AUC	BSC	CUM	DEL	CUE	NAC	EME	IMB	IDV	LDQ	LIB	MAC	MUS	ORE	TEC	CAT
Aucas	—	1–1	—	2–0	1–4	—	—	—	0–2	0–1	—	3–1	1–2	—	—	—
Barcelona	—	—	8–1	4–0	—	—	2–1	—	3–2	—	0–0	2–1	2–2	—	—	1–0
Cumbayá	0–3	—	—	—	1–0	—	1–0	1–2	1–3	—	—	—	—	2–2	1–2	1–1
Delfín	—	—	6–4	—	0–0	1–1	0–1	1–1	—	3–2	—	—	4–2	—	—	—
Deportivo Cuenca	—	1–0	—	—	—	1–2	—	—	0–2	—	1–1	—	—	1–2	1–1	1–2
El Nacional	0–0	3–0	2–1	—	—	—	—	—	—	—	1–4	1–3	—	0–1	2–1	0–2
Emelec	0–0	—	—	—	0–1	0–1	—	2–2	—	0–1	—	—	—	2–1	3–1	—
Imbabura	1–2	1–3	—	—	0–2	1–0	—	—	—	4–0	—	—	2–3	0–1	0–6	—
Independiente del Valle	—	—	—	1–2	—	2–0	2–1	3–1	—	—	—	7–0	—	—	1–0	5–2
LDU Quito	—	3–0	2–1	—	5–0	1–1	—	—	2–1	—	3–0	—	1–1	2–0	—	—
Libertad	1–1	—	2–1	2–0	—	—	2–1	3–1	1–1	—	—	0–1	2–2	—	—	—
Macará	—	—	1–1	0–2	3–1	—	1–1	2–0	—	0–4	—	—	—	—	0–0	1–2
Mushuc Runa	—	—	0–0	—	1–1	2–2	3–0	—	1–1	—	—	2–1	—	3–0	—	—
Orense	4–0	3–2	—	0–0	—	—	—	—	0–0	—	1–0	1–0	—	—	0–2	2–2
Técnico Universitario	2–0	2–2	—	0–1	—	—	—	—	—	1–2	3–0	—	2–2	—	—	2–0
Universidad Católica	3–2	—	—	2–1	—	—	2–0	2–1	—	2–4	1–2	—	5–1	—	—	—

Source: LigaPro, Soccerway
Legend: Blue = home team win; Yellow = draw; Red = away team win.

== Finals ==
The finals (Third stage) were played by Independiente del Valle (first stage winners) and LDU Quito (second stage winners). The winners of this double-legged series were crowned as Serie A champions. By having a better placement in the aggregate table, Independiente del Valle played the second leg at home.

7 December 2024
15:30 UTC−5

LDU Quito	3–0	Independiente del Valle
Arce 45+2', 57'; Villamíl 73'	Report

Estadio Rodrigo Paz Delgado, Quito
Referee: Bryan Loayza

14 December 2024
15:30 UTC−5

Independiente del Valle	1–0	LDU Quito
Zárate 90+6'	Report

Estadio Banco Guayaquil, Quito
Referee: Guillermo Guerrero

LDU Quito won 3–1 on aggregate.

== Aggregate table ==
Pos	Team	Pld	W	D	L	GF	GA	GD	Pts	Qualification or relegation
1	Independiente del Valle	30	19	8	3	56	22	+34	65	Qualification for Copa Libertadores group stage
2	LDU Quito (C)	30	20	5	5	60	31	+29	65	Qualification for Copa Libertadores group stage
3	Barcelona	30	16	8	6	54	29	+25	56	Qualification for Copa Libertadores second stage
4	Universidad Católica	30	15	6	9	59	44	+15	51	Qualification for Copa Sudamericana first stage
5	Aucas	30	12	9	9	47	40	+7	45	Qualification for Copa Sudamericana first stage
6	Mushuc Runa	30	10	11	9	45	43	+2	41	Qualification for Copa Sudamericana first stage
7	El Nacional (Note: El Nacional were deducted three points as punishment for outstanding debts.)	30	13	4	13	33	36	−3	40	Qualification for Copa Libertadores first stage (Note: El Nacional qualified for the Copa Libertadores first stage by winning the 2024 Copa Ecuador.)
8	Orense	30	10	10	10	28	33	−5	40	Qualification for Copa Sudamericana first stage
9	Técnico Universitario	30	10	8	12	39	36	+3	38	
10	Emelec (Note: Emelec were deducted three points as punishment for delayed debt payments.)	30	9	10	11	29	32	−3	34	
11	Macará	30	8	9	13	26	40	−14	33	
12	Delfín	30	8	7	15	29	45	−16	31	
13	Deportivo Cuenca (Note: Deportivo Cuenca were deducted three points as punishment for delayed debt payments.)	30	7	11	12	40	45	−5	29	
14	Libertad (Note: Libertad were deducted four points as punishment for the involvement of two of their players in match-fixing and illegal betting during the previous season.)	30	7	10	13	28	43	−15	27	
15	Imbabura (R)	30	6	6	18	34	60	−26	24	Relegation to Ecuadorian Serie B
16	Cumbayá (R)	30	6	6	18	25	53	−28	24	Relegation to Ecuadorian Serie B

Source: LigaPro
Rules for classification: 1) Points, 2) Goal difference, 3) Goals for, 4) Away goals for, 5) Head-to-head record, 6) Drawing of lots.
(C) Champions; (R) Relegated

== Top scorers ==
Rank	Player	Club	Goals
1	(Paraguay) Álex Arce	LDU Quito	28
2	(Ecuador) Diego Armas	Técnico Universitario	20
2	(Colombia) Jeison Medina	Aucas / Independiente del Valle	20
4	(Ecuador) Janner Corozo	Barcelona	17
5	(Argentina) Pablo Magnín	Deportivo Cuenca	15
6	(Panama) José Fajardo	Universidad Católica	13
7	(Uruguay) Octavio Rivero	Barcelona	11
8	(Panama) Ismael Díaz	Universidad Católica	10
8	(Ecuador) Erik Mendoza	Imbabura	10
10	(Uruguay) Jonathan dos Santos	Mushuc Runa	9
10	(Argentina) Francisco Fydriszewski	Barcelona	9
10	(Ecuador) Miguel Parrales	Orense	9

Source: Futbolecuador.com

== See also ==
- 2024 Copa Ecuador
