= 2025 LigaPro Serie A =

LigaPro Serie A
- Season: 2025
- Dates: 14 February – 21 December 2025
- Champions: Independiente del Valle (2nd title)
- Relegated: Vinotinto Ecuador; El Nacional
- Copa Libertadores: Independiente del Valle; LDU Quito; Barcelona; Universidad Católica (via Copa Ecuador)
- Copa Sudamericana: Orense; Libertad; Macará; Deportivo Cuenca
- Matches: 311
- Goals: 789 (2.54 per match)
- Top goalscorer: Daniel Valencia (21 goals)
- Biggest home win: Aucas 8–0 Delfín (10 November)
- Biggest away win: Mushuc Runa 0–5 Barcelona (22 June); El Nacional 0–5 Mushuc Runa (27 September)
- Highest scoring: U. Católica 6–2 Aucas (3 August); Aucas 8–0 Delfín (10 November)

The 2025 Campeonato Ecuatoriano de Fútbol Serie A was the 67th season of the Serie A, Ecuador's top tier football league, and the seventh under the management of the Liga Profesional de Fútbol del Ecuador (or LigaPro). The season began on 14 February and ended on 21 December 2025. The fixture for the first stage of the season was released on 16 January 2025.

In this season Independiente del Valle won their second league title, clinching the Serie A championship with three matches left after a 1–1 draw with Libertad and a defeat for LDU Quito against Orense on 6 December 2025. LDU Quito were the defending champions for the second season in a row.

== Format changes ==
On 27 September 2024, the Council of Presidents of LigaPro approved changes to the format of competition for the 2025 season, aiming to have more matches played in the season. The tournament, which had 72 additional matches, had two stages: a first stage in which the 16 participating teams played each other twice (once at home and once away), and a final stage in which the teams were split into two hexagonals and one quadrangular group according to their placements in the first stage. In the first hexagonal, the top six teams from the first stage played each other twice to decide the season champions as well as three Copa Libertadores berths and three Copa Sudamericana ones, while in the second hexagonal the next six teams played for the last berth to the Copa Sudamericana. The top team at the end of the first stage was assured of qualification for the Copa Libertadores group stage as Ecuador 2. Relegation was decided in a group that involved the four lowest-placed teams in the first stage, with the bottom two being relegated to the second tier at the end of the season. Points from the first stage were carried over to the final stage.

== Teams ==
=== Team changes ===
Sixteen teams competed in the season, the top 14 teams from the 2024 Ecuadorian Serie A and the top two teams of the 2024 Ecuadorian Serie B. Imbabura and Cumbayá were relegated from Serie A after finishing in the bottom two places of the aggregate table of the previous season and were replaced by the second tier champions Cuniburo and runners-up Manta. Cuniburo clinched a first-ever promotion to the top flight with three matches to go after a 2–0 loss for Guayaquil City against San Antonio on 13 October 2024, whilst Manta ensured a return to Serie A for the first time since 2021 with one match left on 24 October, after a 6–1 thrashing of Vargas Torres.

On 7 November 2024, it was announced that Cuniburo would change its name to Vinotinto Ecuador starting from this season. The name change, approved by the Ecuadorian Ministry of Sports, was made after the club was acquired by the owners of Segunda Categoría club Vinotinto prior to the start of the 2024 season, and aimed to have the club reach out to the Venezuelan expatriate community in Ecuador.

=== Stadia and locations ===
Locations of the 2025 Serie A clubs.

Team	City	Stadium	Capacity
Aucas	Quito	Cooprogreso Gonzalo Pozo Ripalda	21,689
Barcelona	Guayaquil	Monumental Banco Pichincha	57,267
Delfín	Manta	Jocay	21,000
Deportivo Cuenca	Cuenca	Banco del Austro Alejandro Serrano Aguilar	18,549
El Nacional	Quito	Olímpico Atahualpa	35,258
Emelec	Guayaquil	George Capwell Banco del Austro	40,020
Independiente del Valle	Quito	Banco Guayaquil	12,000
LDU Quito	Quito	Rodrigo Paz Delgado	41,575
Libertad	Loja	Reina del Cisne	14,935
Macará	Ambato	Bellavista Universidad Indoamérica	16,467
Manta	Manta	Jocay	21,000
Mushuc Runa	Ambato	COAC Mushuc Runa (Note: Mushuc Runa played most of their home matches at Estadio Olímpico Fernando Guerrero in Riobamba as Estadio COAC Mushuc Runa was closed for failing to meet legal requirements.)	8,200
Orense	Machala	Banco de Machala 9 de Mayo	16,456
Técnico Universitario	Ambato	Bellavista Universidad Indoamérica	16,467
Universidad Católica	Quito	Olímpico Atahualpa	35,258
Vinotinto Ecuador	Quito	Olímpico Atahualpa	35,258

=== Personnel and kits ===
Team	Manager	Kit manufacturer	Shirt sponsor
Aucas	(Colombia) Juan Pablo Buch	Lotto	
Barcelona	(Spain) Ismael Rescalvo	Marathon	Pilsener
Delfín	(Argentina) Juan Zubeldía	Baldo's	Hotel Oro Verde Manta
Deportivo Cuenca	(Ecuador) Norberto Araujo	Lotto	Banco del Austro, Chubb Seguros
El Nacional	(Ecuador) Juan Carlos Pérez	Lotto	ANDEC, Teojama Comercial
Emelec	(Argentina) Guillermo Duró	Adidas	Zapping
Independiente del Valle	(Spain) Javier Rabanal	Marathon	Ecuabet, Banco Guayaquil, MG Motor, Chubb Seguros
LDU Quito	(Brazil) Tiago Nunes	Puma	Banco Pichincha
Libertad	(Ecuador) Juan Carlos León	Macón Sport	Grand Aviation
Macará	(Uruguay) Guillermo Sanguinetti	Boman	San Francisco COAC Ltda.
Manta	(Ecuador) Javier Carvajal	Jasa Evolution	Atún Isabel, Terminal Portuaria de Manta, Tadel S.A.
Mushuc Runa	(Ecuador) Paúl Vélez	Boman	Mushuc Runa COAC
Orense	(Argentina) Raúl Antuña	Elohim	Banco de Machala, IncarPalm
Técnico Universitario	(Colombia) Alejandro Cortez (caretaker)	Vaz Sport	San Francisco COAC Ltda.
Universidad Católica	(Ecuador) Diego Martínez	Umbro	Fundación Crisfe
Vinotinto Ecuador	(Argentina) Gabriel Schürrer	Astro	Panolini

=== Managerial changes ===
Team	Outgoing manager	Manner of departure	Date of vacancy	Position in table	Incoming manager	Date of appointment
First stage
Universidad Católica	(Argentina) Jorge Célico	End of contract	5 December 2024	Pre-season	(Ecuador) Diego Martínez	20 December 2024
El Nacional	(Argentina) Marcelo Zuleta	End of contract	10 December 2024	Pre-season	(Argentina) Omar Asad	23 December 2024
Independiente del Valle	(Argentina) Javier Gandolfi	Sacked	17 December 2024	Pre-season	(Spain) Javier Rabanal	21 December 2024
Delfín	(Ecuador) Javier Carvajal	Sacked	2 January 2025	Pre-season	(Argentina) Nicolás Chietino	6 January 2025
Emelec	(Colombia) Leonel Álvarez	Sacked	22 January 2025	Pre-season	(Argentina) Jorge Célico	23 January 2025
Técnico Universitario	(Ecuador) Paúl Vélez	Sacked	20 March 2025	16th	(Colombia) José Eugenio Hernández	20 March 2025
Orense	(Colombia) Santiago Escobar	Sacked	20 March 2025	11th	(Argentina) Raúl Antuña	24 March 2025
Macará	(Spain) Alex Pallarés	Mutual agreement	14 April 2025	11th	(Uruguay) Guillermo Sanguinetti	14 April 2025
Delfín	(Argentina) Nicolás Chietino	Resigned	20 April 2025	14th	(Ecuador) Patricio Urrutia	24 April 2025
LDU Quito	(Argentina) Pablo Sánchez	Sacked	26 May 2025	6th	(Ecuador) Patricio Hurtado (Note: Caretaker manager.)	26 May 2025
LDU Quito	(Ecuador) Patricio Hurtado	End of caretaker spell	6 June 2025	4th	(Brazil) Tiago Nunes	6 June 2025
Barcelona	(Ecuador) Segundo Castillo	Mutual agreement	19 June 2025	3rd	(Spain) Ismael Rescalvo (Note: Pablo Trobbiani was the caretaker manager for the first stage 17th round match against Mushuc Runa.)	20 June 2025
El Nacional	(Argentina) Omar Asad	Resigned	21 June 2025	12th	(Ecuador) Juan Carlos Pérez (Note: Originally as caretaker manager, appointed on a permanent basis on 15 July 2025.)	24 June 2025
Técnico Universitario	(Colombia) José Eugenio Hernández	Sacked	22 June 2025	16th	(Ecuador) Geovanny Cumbicus	25 June 2025
Emelec	(Argentina) Jorge Célico	Sacked	27 June 2025	14th	(Argentina) Cristian Nasuti	27 June 2025
Mushuc Runa	(Paraguay) Ever Almeida	Sacked	22 July 2025	15th	(Argentina) Fabián Frías	22 July 2025
Emelec	(Argentina) Cristian Nasuti	End of caretaker spell	22 July 2025	10th	(Argentina) Guillermo Duró	22 July 2025
Mushuc Runa	(Argentina) Fabián Frías	Sacked	7 August 2025	16th	(Ecuador) Paúl Vélez	7 August 2025
Vinotinto Ecuador	(Argentina) Juan Grabowski	Resigned	18 August 2025	15th	(Argentina) Gabriel Schürrer	20 August 2025
Manta	(Ecuador) Efrén Mera	Sacked	2 September 2025	13th	(Ecuador) Javier Carvajal	2 September 2025
Aucas	(Argentina) Gabriel Pereyra	Sacked	30 September 2025	9th	(Argentina) Ezequiel Tartaglia	1 October 2025
Final stages
Aucas	(Argentina) Ezequiel Tartaglia	End of caretaker spell	6 October 2025	4th, second hexagonal	(Colombia) Juan Pablo Buch	6 October 2025
Técnico Universitario	(Ecuador) Geovanny Cumbicus	Mutual agreement	11 November 2025	2nd, relegation group	(Colombia) Alejandro Cortez	17 November 2025
Delfín	(Ecuador) Patricio Urrutia	Resigned	12 November 2025	6th, second hexagonal	(Argentina) Juan Zubeldía	21 November 2025

== First stage ==
The first stage began on 14 February and ended on 28 September 2025.

=== Standings ===
Pos	Team	Pld	W	D	L	GF	GA	GD	Pts	Qualification
1	Independiente del Valle	30	18	10	2	55	23	+32	64	Advance to First hexagonal and qualification for Copa Libertadores group stage
2	Barcelona	30	16	6	8	46	33	+13	54	Advance to First hexagonal
3	LDU Quito	30	14	9	7	48	31	+17	51	Advance to First hexagonal
4	Universidad Católica	30	13	10	7	58	39	+19	49	Advance to First hexagonal
5	Orense	30	13	8	9	34	32	+2	47	Advance to First hexagonal
6	Libertad	30	12	10	8	42	36	+6	46	Advance to First hexagonal
7	Deportivo Cuenca	30	13	7	10	35	29	+6	46	Advance to Second hexagonal
8	Emelec	30	11	9	10	30	34	−4	42	Advance to Second hexagonal
9	Aucas	30	11	8	11	38	41	−3	41	Advance to Second hexagonal
10	Macará	30	9	11	10	32	30	+2	38	Advance to Second hexagonal
11	El Nacional	30	9	7	14	32	46	−14	34	Advance to Second hexagonal
12	Delfín	30	6	13	11	26	42	−16	31	Advance to Second hexagonal
13	Técnico Universitario	30	7	7	16	26	46	−20	28	Advance to Relegation group
14	Vinotinto Ecuador	30	7	6	17	34	43	−9	27	Advance to Relegation group
15	Mushuc Runa	30	7	6	17	38	50	−12	27	Advance to Relegation group
16	Manta	30	5	11	14	34	53	−19	26	Advance to Relegation group

Source: LigaPro, Soccerway
Rules for classification: 1) Points, 2) Goal difference, 3) Goals for, 4) Away goals for, 5) Head-to-head record, 6) Drawing of lots.

=== Results ===
Home \ Away	AUC	BSC	DEL	CUE	NAC	EME	IDV	LDQ	LIB	MAC	MAN	MUS	ORE	TEC	CAT	VIN
Aucas	—	2–0	2–1	1–3	1–0	1–2	1–2	1–0	2–0	1–4	1–1	2–0	0–0	4–1	2–1	2–2
Barcelona	1–1	—	2–0	0–0	1–0	2–0	0–4	0–1	3–3	0–2	1–2	1–0	2–0	1–1	2–3	2–1
Delfín	1–1	0–1	—	0–0	0–3	2–0	1–1	0–4	0–0	0–0	2–0	3–1	0–0	0–1	1–0	3–3
Deportivo Cuenca	2–0	0–1	1–1	—	4–1	0–1	0–3	1–2	0–1	1–1	2–0	1–0	1–1	2–0	3–1	2–0
El Nacional	0–1	1–2	3–2	0–1	—	2–0	1–3	1–0	2–2	0–2	1–0	0–5	0–1	0–0	0–3	2–1
Emelec	0–1	0–4	2–2	1–1	4–0	—	0–1	1–0	1–1	0–0	1–1	1–0	1–0	0–1	0–4	2–0
Independiente del Valle	2–1	1–1	0–0	4–0	1–0	1–2	—	1–1	1–1	1–1	2–0	2–1	2–1	4–0	1–1	3–1
LDU Quito	3–1	3–1	3–0	2–2	2–2	2–0	1–1	—	1–1	1–1	1–1	2–1	4–0	3–2	2–4	0–0
Libertad	3–2	1–4	0–1	2–1	1–3	1–2	2–0	0–1	—	0–1	1–0	2–1	4–1	4–1	3–1	1–0
Macará	1–1	0–1	0–0	0–1	1–1	1–1	1–2	0–1	1–1	—	2–2	2–1	1–0	0–1	1–4	1–0
Manta	1–1	2–3	2–2	0–1	4–3	2–4	0–0	1–1	1–1	1–3	—	2–1	0–0	2–1	4–2	2–2
Mushuc Runa	1–0	0–5	2–0	3–1	2–3	1–1	2–2	1–0	1–2	4–3	2–0	—	2–5	0–1	1–1	1–2
Orense	2–1	3–1	3–1	1–0	1–1	0–0	1–2	2–1	0–1	1–0	2–1	3–1	—	2–1	1–1	0–0
Técnico Universitario	1–1	0–1	1–2	0–2	0–0	0–1	1–2	1–3	2–2	1–0	3–1	1–1	1–2	—	1–1	1–3
Universidad Católica	6–2	2–2	1–1	2–1	1–1	1–1	0–3	3–1	1–1	1–0	3–0	1–1	2–0	2–0	—	3–0
Vinotinto Ecuador	0–1	0–1	5–0	0–1	0–1	2–1	1–3	1–2	1–0	1–2	4–1	1–1	0–1	0–1	3–2	—

Source: LigaPro, Soccerway
Legend: Blue = home team win; Yellow = draw; Red = away team win.

== Final stages ==
For the final stages, the teams were split into three groups according to their placement in the first stage. The top six teams in the first stage played the first hexagonal, in which the championship as well as most of the international berths were awarded, whilst the next six teams played the second hexagonal for the last Copa Sudamericana berth. The bottom four teams played the relegation group, where the two worst placed teams were relegated at the end of the season. Teams carried over their first stage records to the final stages.

On 18 December 2025, LigaPro were notified of El Nacional's administrative relegation per ruling by the Ecuadorian Football Federation and announced that their last match against Delfín would not be played.

=== First hexagonal ===
Pos	Team	Pld	W	D	L	GF	GA	GD	Pts	Qualification	IDV	LDQ	BSC	CAT	ORE	LIB
1	Independiente del Valle (C)	40	23	13	4	67	30	+37	82	Qualification for the Copa Libertadores group stage (Note: Since the first stage winners Independiente del Valle ended up winning the league championship, the Copa Libertadores group stage awarded to the first stage winners was passed to the season runners-up.)	—	0–0	1–0	0–2	0–0	1–1
2	LDU Quito	40	19	12	9	68	41	+27	69	Qualification for the Copa Libertadores group stage	2–1	—	3–0	2–0	4–0	3–1
3	Barcelona	40	19	10	11	56	47	+9	67	Qualification for the Copa Libertadores second stage	0–3	2–2	—	1–1	2–1	1–0
4	Universidad Católica	40	14	16	10	67	50	+17	58	Qualification for the Copa Libertadores first stage (Note: Universidad Católica qualified for the Copa Libertadores first stage as 2025 Copa Ecuador champions.)	0–1	2–2	1–1	—	0–0	1–1
5	Orense	40	16	10	14	44	48	−4	58	Qualification for the Copa Sudamericana first stage	1–2	2–1	1–2	2–1	—	3–2
6	Libertad	40	14	14	12	54	51	+3	56	Qualification for the Copa Sudamericana first stage	1–3	2–1	1–1	1–1	2–0	—

Source: LigaPro, Soccerway
Legend: Blue = home team win; Yellow = draw; Red = away team win.
Rules for classification: 1) Points, 2) Goal difference, 3) Goals for, 4) Away goals for, 5) Head-to-head record, 6) Drawing of lots.
(C) Champions

=== Second hexagonal ===
Pos	Team	Pld	W	D	L	GF	GA	GD	Pts	Qualification or relegation	MAC	CUE	AUC	EME	DEL	NAC
1	Macará	40	17	11	12	53	35	+18	62	Qualification for the Copa Sudamericana first stage	—	0–1	3–2	3–0	3–0	2–0
2	Deportivo Cuenca	40	17	8	15	51	41	+10	59	Qualification for the Copa Sudamericana first stage	0–2	—	1–2	5–1	0–0	5–0
3	Aucas	40	16	10	14	59	54	+5	58		0–2	2–1	—	0–0	8–0	3–3
4	Emelec	40	15	10	15	42	49	−7	55		0–2	3–1	0–2	—	1–0	5–0
5	Delfín	40	8	15	17	33	62	−29	39		0–4	2–0	0–1	0–1	—	2–2
6	El Nacional (Note: El Nacional were deducted nine points as punishment for failing to meet debt payment deadlines twice. On 16 December 2025, the Ecuadorian Football Federation ordered El Nacional's relegation to Serie B due to a third breach.) (R)	40	12	9	19	44	70	−26	36	Administrative relegation to Serie B	2–0	0–2	3–1	2–1	0–3 (Note: Match awarded 0–3 to Delfín due to El Nacional's administrative relegation.)	—

Source: LigaPro, Soccerway
Legend: Blue = home team win; Yellow = draw; Red = away team win.
Rules for classification: 1) Points, 2) Goal difference, 3) Goals for, 4) Away goals for, 5) Head-to-head record, 6) Drawing of lots.
(R) Relegated

=== Relegation group ===
Pos	Team	Pld	W	D	L	GF	GA	GD	Pts	Relegation	MAN	MUS	TEC	VIN
1	Manta	36	9	12	15	46	59	−13	39		—	3–0	2–0	3–1
2	Mushuc Runa	36	9	9	18	42	55	−13	36		1–1	—	1–0	2–1
3	Técnico Universitario	36	8	9	19	31	54	−23	33		2–3	0–0	—	1–1
4	Vinotinto Ecuador (R)	36	8	8	20	40	51	−11	32	Relegation to Serie B (Note: Originally, the bottom two teams of the relegation group would be relegated to Serie B. However, due to El Nacional's administrative relegation, only the team placing last in the group was relegated.)	2–0	0–0	1–2	—

Source: LigaPro, Soccerway
Legend: Blue = home team win; Yellow = draw; Red = away team win.
Rules for classification: 1) Points, 2) Goal difference, 3) Goals for, 4) Away goals for, 5) Head-to-head record, 6) Drawing of lots.
(R) Relegated

== Top scorers ==
Rank	Player	Club	Goals
1	(Ecuador) Daniel Valencia	Manta	21
2	(Argentina) Claudio Spinelli	Independiente del Valle	20
3	(Ecuador) Djorkaeff Reasco	El Nacional	18
3	(Ecuador) Byron Palacios	Universidad Católica	18
3	(Argentina) Rafael Monti	Vinotinto Ecuador	18
6	(Ecuador) Eber Caicedo	Libertad	15
6	(Ecuador) Janner Corozo	Barcelona	15
8	(Argentina) Federico Paz	Macará	13
8	(Ecuador) Michael Estrada	LDU Quito	13
10	(Paraguay) Brian Montenegro	Aucas	12
10	(Bolivia) Bruno Miranda	Aucas	12
10	(Ecuador) Alejandro Tobar	Deportivo Cuenca	12

Source: Besoccer

== See also ==
- 2025 Ecuadorian Serie B
- 2025 Copa Ecuador
