= 2024 Copa Ecuador =

Copa Ecuador DirecTV PlayGreen 2024

Tournament details
- Country: Ecuador
- Dates: 19 June – 27 November 2024
- Teams: 49

Final positions
- Champions: El Nacional (2nd title)
- Runners-up: Independiente del Valle
- Copa Libertadores: El Nacional

Tournament statistics
- Matches played: 50
- Goals scored: 112 (2.24 per match)
- Top goal scorer: Edinson Mero (6 goals)

The 2024 Copa Ecuador (officially known as the Copa Ecuador DirecTV PlayGreen 2024 for sponsorship purposes) was the fourth edition of the Copa Ecuador, Ecuador's domestic football cup. It began on 19 June 2024 and ended with the single-match final on 27 November 2024.

El Nacional won their second Copa Ecuador title in this edition, defeating the defending champions Independiente del Valle 1–0 in the final. As Copa Ecuador champions, El Nacional qualified for the 2025 Copa Libertadores.

== Format ==
For this season, the competition was played as a single knockout tournament, unlike the previous season in which a semifinal group was implemented, and was divided into four stages. The first of those four stages was a qualifying one which was intended to be played by four teams: the two worst placed Segunda Categoría teams in the previous season and the amateur runner-up and third-placed teams, but this round eventually only involved one Segunda Categoría team and an amateur one. The qualifying stage winners advanced to the first stage, in which the 10 Ecuadorian Serie B teams, the remaining Segunda Categoría ones and the amateur champions entered the competition.

The 16 Ecuadorian Serie A teams joined the competition in the second stage, comprising the round of 32, round of 16, quarter-finals and semi-finals, whilst the third stage was the final match between the two semi-final winners. All rounds in the competition except for the semi-finals were played over a single leg, which was hosted by the team from the lower tier or the worst placed team in the season's aggregate table if both teams were from the same league. The semi-finals were played over two legs.

== Prizes ==
The champions of this edition (or the runners-up, if the champions had already qualified) qualified for the 2025 Copa Libertadores, taking the Ecuador 4 berth in that competition, as well as the 2025 Supercopa Ecuador against the 2024 Ecuadorian Serie A champions. Monetary prizes were also granted for this edition, with the champions being awarded US$340,000 and the runners-up receiving US$200,000. The two losing semi-finalists were awarded US$80,000, the quarter-finalists received US$50,000, whilst teams eliminated in the round of 16, first round and eliminatory stage were awarded US$30,000, US$20,000 and US$10,000, respectively.

== Schedule ==
Round	Draw date	Matches
Qualifying stage	12 June 2024	19 June 2024
First round	12 June 2024	21 June – 7 July 2024
Round of 32	8 July 2024	19 July – 15 August 2024
Round of 16	8 July 2024	21 August – 8 September 2024
Quarter-finals	8 July 2024	19 September – 2 October 2024
Semi-finals	8 July 2024	22–23 October 2024 (1st leg); 29–31 October 2024 (2nd leg)
Final	8 July 2024	27 November 2024 (Quito)

== Teams ==
49 clubs took part in this edition of the Copa Ecuador: 16 from the Serie A, 10 from the Serie B, 21 from the Segunda Categoría, and 2 amateur teams.

=== Serie A ===
- Aucas
- Barcelona
- Cumbayá
- Delfín
- Deportivo Cuenca
- El Nacional
- Emelec
- Imbabura
- Independiente del Valle
- Libertad
- LDU Quito
- Macará
- Mushuc Runa
- Orense
- Técnico Universitario
- Universidad Católica

=== Serie B ===
- 9 de Octubre
- Chacaritas
- Cuniburo
- Gualaceo
- Guayaquil City
- Independiente Juniors
- Leones del Norte
- Manta
- San Antonio
- Vargas Torres

=== Segunda Categoría ===
- Atlético Quinindé
- AV25
- Baños Ciudad de Fuego
- Bonita Banana
- Deportivo Coca
- Deportivo Santo Domingo
- Dunamis 04
- Ecuagenera
- Junior
- La Cantera
- La Castellana
- La Paz
- La Unión
- LDU Cuenca
- Mineros
- Naranja Mekánica
- Olmedo
- Río Aguarico
- Río Babahoyo
- Santa Elena Sumpa
- Vicentino Dragons

=== Amateur teams ===
- Grupo 7
- Quito

== Qualifying stage ==
The qualifying stage was played as a single match between the worst placed team in the 2023 Segunda Categoría's general standings and the amateur league runner-up. The winner advanced to the first stage.

19 June 2024	Quito	0–1	Atlético Quinindé	Tabacundo
12:00 UTC−5		Report	Nazareno	Stadium: Liga Deportiva Cantonal de Tabacundo

== First round ==
- Teams entering this round: 10 teams from Serie B, 20 teams from Segunda Categoría, and 1 amateur team. The team from the lower tier hosted the match.

Team 1	Score	Team 2
Mineros	3–3 (3–4 p)	Cuniburo
Vicentino Dragons	1–0	Deportivo Coca
Ecuagenera	0–1	Manta
Baños Ciudad de Fuego	1–1 (5–4 p)	Vargas Torres
LDU Cuenca	4–0	Junior
La Castellana	1–1 (5–4 p)	Atlético Quinindé
Dunamis 04	0–2	La Paz
La Cantera	1–1 (3–1 p)	9 de Octubre
AV25	1–0	Chacaritas
La Unión	1–3	Bonita Banana
Naranja Mekánica	0–1	Guayaquil City
Deportivo Santo Domingo	1–0	Río Babahoyo
Río Aguarico	0–2	Leones del Norte
Santa Elena Sumpa	2–0	San Antonio
Grupo 7	0–2	Independiente Juniors
Olmedo	1–0	Gualaceo

Notes

1. The LDU Cuenca v Junior match had been awarded to Junior by walkover due to LDU Cuenca changing their team match sheet from the one originally handed over to the match officials. However, the decision was overturned after a successful appeal by LDU Cuenca.

== Bracket ==
Round of 32
Santa Elena Sumpa (p)	0 (9)
Imbabura	0 (8)
La Paz	0
Universidad Católica	1
AV25	1 (5)
Emelec (p)	1 (6)
La Cantera	0
Técnico Universitario	3
Guayaquil City	3
Cumbayá	0
LDU Cuenca	1 (3)
Delfín (p)	1 (5)
Cuniburo	3
Macará	1
Olmedo	0 (2)
Independiente del Valle (p)	0 (3)
Independiente Juniors	2
Barcelona	0
Leones del Norte	0 (3)
Mushuc Runa (p)	0 (4)
La Castellana	1
Aucas	5
Vicentino Dragons	0
Libertad	2
Bonita Banana	0 (0)
LDU Quito (p)	0 (3)
Manta	1
Deportivo Cuenca	3
Deportivo Santo Domingo	3
Orense	1
Baños Ciudad de Fuego	1 (1)
El Nacional (p)	1 (3)

Round of 16
Santa Elena Sumpa	1
Universidad Católica	4
Emelec	0 (2)
Técnico Universitario (p)	0 (3)
Guayaquil City	3
Delfín	1
Cuniburo	1
Independiente del Valle	2
Independiente Juniors	0
Mushuc Runa	1
Aucas	0
Libertad	1
LDU Quito	3
Deportivo Cuenca	0
Deportivo Santo Domingo	2
El Nacional	3

Quarter-finals
Universidad Católica (p)	2 (4)
Técnico Universitario	2 (3)
Guayaquil City	1
Independiente del Valle	2
Mushuc Runa	2
Libertad	1
LDU Quito	0 (1)
El Nacional (p)	0 (3)

Semi-finals
Universidad Católica	0	2	2 (5)
Independiente del Valle (p)	1	1	2 (6)
Mushuc Runa	1	0	1
El Nacional	2	2	4

Final
Independiente del Valle	0
El Nacional	1

== Round of 32 ==
- Teams entering this round: 16 teams from Serie A. The team from the lower tier hosted the match.

19 July 2024	La Castellana	1–5	Aucas	Loja
19:00 UTC−5	Rodríguez 13'	Report	Rodríguez 17' (o.g.); Zambrano 44'; Cano 65'; Blanco 69'; Espinoza 82'	Stadium: Reina del Cisne; Referee: Cristian Arízaga

20 July 2024	Baños Ciudad de Fuego	1–1 (1–3 p)	El Nacional	Baños
19:00 UTC−5	D. Carabalí 46'	Report	Guisamano 21'	Stadium: Coronel José Silva Romo; Referee: Russell Terán
	Penalties
	Caicedo (penalty missed); Mejía (penalty missed); Díaz (penalty scored); J. Carabalí (penalty missed)		(penalty missed) Borja; (penalty scored) Flor; (penalty scored) Patiño; (penalty scored) Vélez

21 July 2024	Leones del Norte	0–0 (3–4 p)	Mushuc Runa	Ibarra
16:30 UTC−5		Report		Stadium: Olímpico; Referee: Gorky Araujo
	Penalties
	Jiménez (penalty scored); Lastra (penalty missed); Velasco (penalty missed); Coppo (penalty scored); Montes (penalty scored)		(penalty missed) Estacio; (penalty scored) Bauman; (penalty scored) Gracia; (penalty scored) Ocles; (penalty scored) Vergés

21 July 2024	Manta	1–3	Deportivo Cuenca	Manta
19:00 UTC−5	Carcelén 27'	Report	Luna 1'; Mancinelli 37'; Magnín 44' (pen.)	Stadium: Jocay; Referee: Duletsy Jara

27 July 2024	Santa Elena Sumpa	0–0 (9–8 p)	Imbabura	Milagro
16:30 UTC−5		Report		Stadium: Los Chirijos; Referee: Oswaldo Contreras
	Penalties
	Canales (penalty scored); Estacio (penalty scored); Gordon (penalty scored); Mamani (penalty scored); Mina (penalty scored); Montaño (penalty scored); Corozo (penalty scored); Gómez (penalty scored); Jiménez (penalty scored)		(penalty scored) Pantoja; (penalty scored) Medina; (penalty scored) Tobar; (penalty scored) Pita; (penalty scored) Chalá; (penalty scored) Benítez; (penalty scored) Sánchez; (penalty scored) Burbano; (penalty missed) Espinoza

27 July 2024	Cuniburo	3–1	Macará	Quito
19:00 UTC−5	Ushiña 16'; Lugo 78' (pen.), 90+3'	Report	Orejuela 87' (o.g.)	Stadium: Olímpico Atahualpa; Referee: Jordan Montecé

28 July 2024	La Paz	0–1	Universidad Católica	Portoviejo
16:00 UTC−5		Report	Fajardo 65'	Stadium: Reales Tamarindos; Referee: Luis Troya

28 July 2024	Independiente Juniors	2–0	Barcelona	Quito
19:00 UTC−5	Arroyo 14'; Rentería 75'	Report		Stadium: Banco Guayaquil; Referee: Lenín Quiñónez

29 July 2024	Vicentino Dragons	0–2	Libertad	Baños
19:00 UTC−5		Report	D. Ávila 7'; Zambrano 28'	Stadium: Coronel José Silva Romo; Referee: René Marín

30 July 2024	Bonita Banana	0–0 (0–3 p)	LDU Quito	Machala
19:00 UTC−5		Report		Stadium: 9 de Mayo; Referee: Mario Romero
	Penalties
	Montaño (penalty missed); Zhingre (penalty missed); Méndez (penalty missed)		(penalty scored) Arce; (penalty scored) Alzugaray; (penalty missed) Piovi; (penalty scored) Estrada

31 July 2024	Olmedo	0–0 (2–3 p)	Independiente del Valle	Riobamba
19:00 UTC−5		Report		Stadium: Olímpico Fernando Guerrero; Referee: Jaime Sánchez
	Penalties
	Molina (penalty missed); A. de Jesús (penalty scored); Mairongo (penalty scored); Tene (penalty missed); Vera (penalty missed)		(penalty missed) Mercado; (penalty scored) Hoyos; (penalty missed) Fernández; (penalty scored) R. López; (penalty scored) Páez

5 August 2024	Deportivo Santo Domingo	3–1	Orense	Santo Domingo
19:00 UTC−5	Quevedo 40'; Delgado 50'; Vásquez 78'	Report	Andrade 45+2'	Stadium: Etho Vega; Referee: Roberto Sánchez

6 August 2024	LDU Cuenca	1–1 (3–5 p)	Delfín	Cuenca
19:00 UTC−5	Montalbetti 90+1'	Report	Messiniti 52'	Stadium: Alejandro Serrano Aguilar; Referee: Patricio Parra
	Penalties
	Rossi (penalty missed); Barsallo (penalty scored); Valencia (penalty scored); Cabezas (penalty scored)		(penalty scored) Perlaza; (penalty scored) Phillips; (penalty scored) Angulo; (penalty scored) Castro; (penalty scored) Mieles

7 August 2024	AV25	1–1 (5–6 p)	Emelec	Quito
19:00 UTC−5	Ballesteros 50'	Report	León 66'	Stadium: Olímpico Atahualpa; Referee: Bryan Loayza
	Penalties
	Ballesteros (penalty scored); Coy (penalty missed); Bazarán (penalty scored); Torres (penalty scored); Montero (penalty scored); Amaya (penalty scored); Rincones (penalty missed)		(penalty scored) León; (penalty scored) Solís; (penalty scored) Garcés; (penalty scored) Sánchez; (penalty missed) Chamba; (penalty scored) Valverde; (penalty scored) Caicedo

13 August 2024	Guayaquil City	3–0	Cumbayá	Guayaquil
14:00 UTC−5	Laurino 11'; Mero 34', 83'	Report		Stadium: Christian Benítez Betancourt; Referee: Juan Carlos Andrade

15 August 2024	La Cantera	0–3	Técnico Universitario	Latacunga
14:00 UTC−5		Report	Ledesma 3'; Caicedo 53'; González 63' (pen.)	Stadium: La Cocha; Referee: Russell Terán

== Round of 16 ==
21 August 2024	Santa Elena Sumpa	1–4	Universidad Católica	Milagro
14:00 UTC−5	Angulo 22'	Report	Nieto 20'; Vallecilla 25'; Cifuente 57'; M. Díaz 80'	Stadium: Los Chirijos; Referee: Eloy Beltrán

27 August 2024	Independiente Juniors	0–1	Mushuc Runa	Quito
19:00 UTC−5		Report	Vergés 90+1'	Stadium: Banco Guayaquil; Referee: Hugo Blacio

28 August 2024	LDU Quito	3–0	Deportivo Cuenca	Quito
18:30 UTC−5	M. Julio 33'; Arce 70'; Villamíl 75'	Report		Stadium: Rodrigo Paz Delgado; Referee: Kevin Pazmiño

29 August 2024	Cuniburo	1–2	Independiente del Valle	Quito
18:00 UTC−5	Lugo 54'	Report	J. Medina 65'; Duque 90+1' (o.g.)	Stadium: Olímpico Atahualpa; Referee: Jaime Sánchez

3 September 2024	Deportivo Santo Domingo	2–3	El Nacional	Santo Domingo
19:00 UTC−5	Flor 25' (o.g.); Peñarrieta 58' (pen.)	Report	Ordoñez 3', 86'; Cortez 73'	Stadium: Etho Vega; Referee: Oswaldo Contreras

4 September 2024	Aucas	0–1	Libertad	Quito
18:00 UTC−5		Report	D. Caicedo 45+1'	Stadium: Gonzalo Pozo Ripalda; Referee: René Marín

7 September 2024	Guayaquil City	3–1	Delfín	Guayaquil
19:00 UTC−5	Naula 37'; Mero 61', 86'	Report	Perea 77' (o.g.)	Stadium: Christian Benítez Betancourt; Referee: Bryan Loayza

8 September 2024	Emelec	0–0 (2–3 p)	Técnico Universitario	Guayaquil
19:00 UTC−5		Report		Stadium: George Capwell; Referee: Álex Cajas
	Penalties
	Ruiz Gómez (penalty scored); Erbes (penalty missed); Ricaurte (penalty missed); León (penalty scored); Bagüí (penalty missed)		(penalty scored) Arboleda; (penalty scored) Ledesma; (penalty missed) Armas; (penalty scored) González

== Quarter-finals ==
19 September 2024	Universidad Católica	2–2 (4–3 p)	Técnico Universitario	Quito
15:00 UTC−5	Loor 28'; I. Díaz 45+1' (pen.)	Report	Patta 82'; Caicedo 90+2'	Stadium: Olímpico Atahualpa; Referee: Bryan Loayza
	Penalties
	Nieto (penalty scored); M. Díaz (penalty missed); Clavijo (penalty scored); Fajardo (penalty scored); I. Díaz (penalty missed); Anangonó (penalty scored)		(penalty scored) Caicedo; (penalty missed) Ledesma; (penalty scored) Castillo; (penalty missed) Vera; (penalty scored) Medranda; (penalty missed) Jiménez

24 September 2024	Guayaquil City	1–2	Independiente del Valle	Guayaquil
16:30 UTC−5	Mero 90+2' (pen.)	Report	Arroyo 48'; Sornoza 66'	Stadium: Christian Benítez Betancourt; Referee: Augusto Aragón

26 September 2024	Mushuc Runa	2–1	Libertad	Latacunga
15:00 UTC−5	Fernández 1'; Vergés 56'	Report	Penilla 53'	Stadium: La Cocha; Referee: Juan Carlos Andrade

2 October 2024	LDU Quito	0–0 (1–3 p)	El Nacional	Quito
17:00 UTC−5		Report		Stadium: Rodrigo Paz Delgado; Referee: Gabriel González
	Penalties
	Arce (penalty scored); Alzugaray (penalty missed); Quiñónez (penalty missed); Piovi (penalty missed)		(penalty missed) Bedoya; (penalty scored) Cela; (penalty scored) Pineida; (penalty scored) Vélez
Note: The match, originally scheduled for 25 September 2024 at 19:00 local time, was first moved to 17:00 due to scheduled nationwide blackouts and later postponed to 2 October due to wildfires in the Quito area.

== Semi-finals ==
Team 1	Agg.	Team 2	1st leg	2nd leg
Mushuc Runa	1–4	El Nacional	1–2	0–2
Universidad Católica	2–2 (5–6 p)	Independiente del Valle	0–1	2–1

=== First leg ===
22 October 2024	Universidad Católica	0–1	Independiente del Valle	Quito
15:00 UTC−5		Report	Hoyos 74'	Stadium: Rodrigo Paz Delgado; Referee: Juan Carlos Andrade
Note: The match, originally scheduled to kick off at 17:00 local time, was brought forward by two hours to 15:00 local time.

23 October 2024	Mushuc Runa	1–2	El Nacional	Latacunga
14:00 UTC−5	Gracia 52'	Report	Ordoñez 26', 79'	Stadium: La Cocha; Referee: Anthony Díaz

=== Second leg ===
29 October 2024	Independiente del Valle	1–2 (2–2 agg.) (6–5 p)	Universidad Católica	Quito
17:00 UTC−5	Hoyos 59'	Report	Fajardo 28', 30'	Stadium: Banco Guayaquil; Referee: Augusto Aragón
	Penalties
	J. Medina (penalty scored); Y. Medina (penalty missed); Páez (penalty scored); García (penalty scored); Hoyos (penalty scored); Schunke (penalty scored); Arroyo (penalty scored)		(penalty scored) I. Díaz; (penalty scored) Minda; (penalty scored) Martínez; (penalty scored) Fajardo; (penalty missed) Clavijo; (penalty scored) Anangonó; (penalty missed) Vallecilla

31 October 2024	El Nacional	2–0 (4–1 agg.)	Mushuc Runa	Quito
15:00 UTC−5	Cortez 79'; Borja 89'	Report		Stadium: Olímpico Atahualpa; Referee: Álex Cajas

== Final ==
27 November 2024
15:00 UTC−5

Independiente del Valle	0–1	El Nacional
	Report	Cortez 43'

Estadio Rodrigo Paz Delgado, Quito
Attendance: 25,000
Referee: Yerson Zambrano

== Top scorers ==
Rank	Name	Club	Goals
1	(Ecuador) Edinson Mero	Guayaquil City	6
2	(Ecuador) Jorge Ordoñez	El Nacional	4
3	(Panama) José Fajardo	Universidad Católica	3
3	(Ecuador) José Lugo	Cuniburo	3
3	(Ecuador) Gabriel Cortez	El Nacional	3
6	(Uruguay) Joaquín Vergés	Mushuc Runa	2
6	(Ecuador) Jefferson Caicedo	Técnico Universitario	2
6	(Haiti) Job Belizaire	Cuniburo	2
6	(Ecuador) Maelo Rentería	Independiente Juniors	2
6	(Ecuador) Héctor Penayo	Mineros	2
6	(Ecuador) Nilo Valencia	LDU Cuenca	2
6	(Argentina) Mauro Rossi	LDU Cuenca	2

Source: FEF

== See also ==
- 2024 Ecuadorian Serie A
