= Juan Carlos Carrión =

Ecuadorian football manager

Personal information
- Full name: Juan Carlos Carrión Escobar
- Date of birth: 21 June 1982 (age 44)
- Place of birth: Ecuador

Team information
- Current team: Cumbayá (assistant)

Managerial career
- Years: Team
- 2019: LB San Nicolas (youth)
- 2019: Quinto Guayas
- 2019–2020: Talleres de Santo Domingo (assistant)
- 2021–2022: Franco Sport (futsal)
- 2022–2023: Latacunga City
- 2023–2024: Cumbayá (youth)
- 2024: Cumbayá (interim)
- 2024–: Cumbayá (assistant)

Juan Carlos Carrión Escobar (born 21 June 1982) is an Ecuadorian football manager, currently the assistant manager of Cumbayá.

== Career ==
Carrión began his career in 2004, as a sporting director of local sides. In 2018, after working as a manager of seven-a-side football side Bambuca, he became a sporting director of LDU Quito's youth sides.

In 2019, after being a manager of the youth sides of Liga Barrial San Nicolas, Carrión became a manager of amateur side Quinto Guayas, and later became a youth coordinator of a football school of Mexican side Club América in Ecuador. Also in that year, he worked as an assistant in the main squad of Talleres de Santo Domingo.

In 2022, after managing futsal side Franco Sport, Carrión took over Segunda Categoría side Latacunga City. In the following year, he joined Cumbayá as manager of the youth sides.

On 27 September 2024, Carrión replaced sacked Armando Osma as manager of Cumbayá's first team in an interim manner. On his professional debut the following day, he led the club to a 1–0 home win over Emelec, and later became an assistant of Diego Chamorro.
