= Galo Rodríguez =

Ecuadorian footballer and manager (born 1972)

Personal information
- Full name: Galo Mariano Rodríguez Meza
- Date of birth: 8 April 1972 (age 54)
- Place of birth: Cayambe, Ecuador
- Position: Midfielder

Senior career*
Years	Team	Apps	(Gls)
- San Pedro
2001	9 de Octubre		
2002	San Pedro		
2008	JUPS		

Managerial career
- El Nacional (youth)
- 2013–2019: Independiente del Valle (youth)
- 2020–2022: 9 de Octubre (assistant)
- 2023: Independiente Juniors
- 2024: Imbabura
- * Club domestic league appearances and goals

Galo Mariano Rodríguez Meza (born 8 April 1872) is an Ecuadorian football manager and former player who played as a midfielder.

== Playing career ==
Born in Cayambe, Pichincha Rodríguez mainly played for clubs in his native state, aside from a short spell at 9 de Octubre in 2001. He also notably represented San Pedro and JUPS.

== Managerial career ==
After retiring, Rodríguez joined Independiente del Valle's youth categories in 2013. Ahead of the 2020 season, he moved to 9 de Octubre as Juan Carlos León's assistant.

Ahead of the 2023 season, Rodríguez returned to IDV after being appointed manager of reserve team Independiente Juniors in the Serie B. He left in the end of the season, after finishing in the fifth position.

On 31 August 2024, Rodríguez was named in charge of Serie A side Imbabura, replacing sacked Martín Wainer, but was himself dismissed on 3 November.
