= Jorge Alfonso =

Argentine footballer and manager

Personal information
- Full name: Jorge Rolando Alfonso Ávalos
- Date of birth: 26 January 1971 (age 55)
- Place of birth: Buenos Aires, Argentina
- Position: Defender

Team information
- Current team: Real Tomayapo (manager)

Youth career
- 1980–1991: Racing Club

Senior career*
| Years | Team | Apps | (Gls) |
| 1991–1994 | Racing Club | 7 | (1) |
| 1994–1995 | Almirante Brown | 4 | (0) |
| 1995–1996 | Coras | | |
| 1997–1998 | Dock Sud | | |
| 1998–2000 | Argentino de Quilmes | | |
| 2000–2001 | Estudiantes de Río Cuarto | | |
| 2002 | Deportivo Saquisilí | | |

Managerial career
- 2003: Deportivo Saquisilí
- 2004: LDU Portoviejo (assistant)
- 2005: Macará (assistant)
- 2006–2007: Macará (reserves)
- 2009–2010: Manta (assistant)
- 2011: Deportivo Quito (assistant)
- 2011: Imbabura (assistant)
- 2012: Técnico Universitario (assistant)
- 2012–2013: Macará (assistant)
- 2013: Manta (assistant)
- 2014: Manta (reserves)
- 2014: Manta
- 2015: Técnico Universitario
- 2015–2016: Cobreloa (assistant)
- 2017: Manta
- 2017: Huachipato (assistant)
- 2018: Sport Boys Warnes (assistant)
- 2018–2019: Gualaceo
- 2020–2022: Cibao
- 2023: Norte América (youth)
- 2024: Aucas (youth)
- 2024: Aucas (interim)
- 2025–2026: Moca
- 2026–: Real Tomayapo
- * Club domestic league appearances and goals

Jorge Rolando Alfonso Ávalos (born 26 January 1971) is an Argentine football manager and former player who played as a defender. He is the current manager of Bolivian club Real Tomayapo.

== Playing career ==
Born in Buenos Aires, Alfonso was a Racing Club youth graduate. After making his first team debut in 1991, he subsequently played for Almirante Brown before joining Mexican side Coras in 1995.

Back to Argentina in 1996, Alfonso played for Dock Sud, Argentino de Quilmes and Estudiantes de Río Cuarto. He retired with Ecuadorian side Deportivo Saquisilí in 2002, aged 31.

== Managerial career ==
After retiring, Alfonso began his managerial career with Saquisilí in 2003. He subsequently returned to his first club Racing as a youth manager, before becoming an assistant of Abel Moralejo at LDU Portoviejo.

After being an assistant of Víctor Luna at Macará, Alfonso remained in the club in the following three seasons, as youth director and manager of the reserves. In 2009, he became an assistant of Fabián Bustos at Manta, and followed the manager to Deportivo Quito, Imbabura, Técnico Universitario, Macará and back to Manta.

Alfonso remained at Manta for the 2014 season, even after Bustos' departure, and was named manager of the reserves. On 11 October of that year, he was named manager of the main squad in the place of Armando Osma, but was unable to avoid relegation.

On 26 May 2015, Alfonso returned to Técnico Universitario, now being appointed manager of the Ecuadorian Serie B side. Sacked on 12 July, he subsequently joined César Vigevani's staff at Chilean club Cobreloa.

On 19 December 2016, Alfonso returned to Ecuador and Manta, after being named at the helm of the club. Dismissed the following 17 April, he returned to Chile to reunite with Vigevani at Huachipato; he was also his assistant at Bolivian side Sport Boys Warnes in 2018.

On 17 August 2018, Alfonso was appointed in charge of Gualaceo also in the Ecuadorian second division. He left the club in April of the following year, and moved to the Dominican Republic in March 2020 to take over Cibao FC.

Alonso left Cibao at the end of the 2022 season, and subsequently returned to Ecuador to take over the youth sides of Norte América. In 2024, after the latter club established a partnership with Aucas, he became a manager of their youth setup before being appointed in charge of the first team on 4 July of that year.

Araujo later managed Dominican side Moca FC and Bolivian club Real Tomayapo.

== Honours ==
Cibao

- Liga Dominicana de Fútbol: 2021, 2022
