= Joe Armas =

Ecuadorian football manager (born 1995)

Personal information
- Full name: William Joel Armas Suqui
- Date of birth: 16 August 1995 (age 31)
- Place of birth: Los Bancos, Ecuador
- Position: Goalkeeper

Team information
- Current team: Independiente Juniors (manager)

Youth career
- 2007: Deportivo Quito
- 2008–2011: LDU Quito

Senior career*
Years	Team	Apps	(Gls)
2011–2012	LDU Quito	0	(0)

Managerial career
- 2019: Ecuador U15 (assistant)
- 2019–2020: Toledo (assistant)
- 2021–2024: Imbabura
- 2025–: Independiente Juniors
- * Club domestic league appearances and goals

William Joel "Joe" Armas Suqui (born 16 August 1995) is an Ecuadorian football manager, currently in charge of Independiente Juniors.

== Playing career ==
Born in the Los Bancos Canton of Ecuador, Armas' parents moved to Quito when he was a child. He spent a year in the academy of local side Deportivo Quito before spending five seasons with LDU Quito, playing as a goalkeeper. He appeared once on the bench for the latter, on 4 December 2011, but did not feature as his side drew 0–0 with Olmedo.

== Managerial career ==
=== Early career ===
After deciding that he would rather coach football than play it, he entered the Institute of the Ecuadorian Football Federation in order to study coaching. He received a degree from the National Autonomous University of Mexico, before deciding to move to Europe to continue his studies, working as a bricklayer in order to fund the trip. His first stop in Europe was Spain, where he worked in the academies of Athletic Bilbao and Real Madrid, also earning his coaching degree and two master's degrees while in the country; one in sports management and the other as a football manager.

He spent time working with the Mexico national under-17 football team, before moving to the Netherlands, where he completed internships at Ajax, PSV and AZ Alkmaar. On his return to Ecuador in 2019, he worked as an assistant coach again, this time with Eduardo Moscoso at the 2019 South American U-15 Championship with the Ecuador under-15 football team. Following this, he returned briefly to Spain, working as an assistant coach to Manu Calleja at CD Toledo.

After the owners of Toledo decided to sell the club, Armas returned to Ecuador, where he sent his CV to nearly three-hundred clubs, even offering to work for free. Having been unsuccessful in Ecuador, he tried again in Guatemala, spending a month looking for a job in the country, but again failed to find a job.

=== Imbabura ===
==== 2021: Joining the club and promotion ====
He returned to Ecuador again, and received a call from Imbabura, a club in the Segunda Categoría - the third tier of Ecuadorian football. He joined the club in August 2021, and recalled later in an interview with El Universo that the first week was "very complex", due to a number of older players who did not trust Armas, then 26 years old, and his assistant managers, as they were deemed to be too young. Armas told them to value them for their knowledge, and the work they would do, rather than their age.

Having convinced the Imbabura players of his coaching quality, Armas instilled a certain playing style at the club - an unwavering, attacking, possession-based style of play, which did not change even when facing stronger opposition than themselves. Imbabura finished the season as Segunda Categoría runners-up, having the most possession and most goals in the league, and achieving promotion to the Serie B.

==== 2022: Serie B and cup run ====
The following year was best known for Imbabura's Copa Ecuador run; having convincingly beaten Segunda Categoría side Orellanense 7–3 on aggregate, the club faced Serie A side Guayaquil City in the Round of 32. With the game delayed by two weeks due to civil unrest in Ecuador, the rescheduled fixture began with an early goal from Guayaquil City's Miguel Parrales, before Leandro Pantoja scored a first-half equaliser. Despite Guayaquil City missing their first three penalties of the penalty shoot-out, only Pantoja scored from Imbabura's first three penalty takers. However, Imbabura would clinch a 2–1 victory after goals from Guayaquil City's Brazilian forward Ramon and Imbabura's Erick Mendoza, with Jordan Rezabala missing the decisive effort.

The Round of 16 would see Imbabura face Armas' former club, L.D.U. Quito, and the club would secure a historic victory after another goal from Pantoja and a strike from Kevin Rodríguez cancelled out Michael Hoyos' 16th-minute equaliser. Armas could not prevent Imbabura's 3–1 quarter-final loss to Independiente del Valle, but was still commended for his efforts in Ecuadorian media.

Kevin Rodríguez, who had been a key figure in Imbabura's 2022 campaign, scoring ten goals in twenty-nine appearances in all competitions, was rewarded for his form with a surprise call-up to the Ecuador national football team for the 2022 FIFA World Cup, with Armas being credited for the forward's meteoric rise.

==== 2023: Promotion to Serie A ====
On 26 October 2023, Armas' Imbabura defeated Serie B champions Macará 4–0 to secure their own promotion to the Ecuadorian Serie A. Following the game, he compared the team to fictional boxer Rocky Balboa, stating that Imbabura "had so many blows during the season, but round after round [they] kept going."

==== 2024: Serie A and resignation ====
Armas was in charge of Imbabura during the first stage of the 2024 Serie A, but only won three of the 15 matches of the competition. On 18 June 2024, he resigned from the club.

=== Independiente del Valle ===
On 7 January 2025, Armas joined the structure of Independiente del Valle, after being named manager of Independiente Juniors in the second division.

== Career statistics ==
=== Club ===
Appearances and goals by club, season and competition
Club	Season	League			Cup		Other		Total	
Club	Season	Division	Apps	Goals	Apps	Goals	Apps	Goals	Apps	Goals
L.D.U. Quito	2011	Serie A	0	0	0	0	0	0	0	0
L.D.U. Quito	2012	Serie A	0	0	0	0	0	0	0	0
Career total			0	0	0	0	0	0	0	0
