= Federico Paz =

Argentine footballer

Personal information
- Full name: Federico Mariano Paz Navarrete
- Date of birth: 10 November 1994 (age 31)
- Place of birth: San Juan, Argentina
- Height: 1.81 m (5 ft 11 in)
- Position: Forward

Team information
- Current team: Macará
- Number: 7

Youth career
- 2007–2017: San Martín SJ

Senior career*
Years	Team	Apps	(Gls)
2016–2017	San Martín SJ	0	(0)
2016	→ Banfield (loan)	0	(0)
2016	→ Malleco Unido (loan)	11	(0)
2018	Olmedo		
2019–2020	Sportivo Peñarol	15	(2)
2020–2021	Desamparados	36	(7)
2022	Chacaritas	31	(4)
2023–2024	Imbabura	64	(16)
2025–	Macará	44	(16)
- * Club domestic league appearances and goals as of 17 August 2026

Federico Mariano Paz Navarrete (born 10 October 1994) is an Argentine footballer who plays as a forward for Ecuadorian Serie A club Macará.

== Career ==
Born in San Juan, Argentina, Paz is a product of local club San Martín. In the second half of 2016, he moved to Chile and made his professional debut with Malleco Unido.

In 2018, Paz moved abroad again with Ecuadorian club Olmedo.

The next three years, Paz represented Sportivo Peñarol and Desamparados in his homeland.

Back to Ecuador, Paz joined Chacaritas in 2022 and switched to Imbabura the next season, helped them to get promotion to 2024 LigaPro Serie A. In December 2024, he signed with Macará in the top division and took part in the 2026 Copa Sudamericana.
