= Mateo Zambrano =

French footballer (born 1998)

Personal information
- Full name: Mateo Alejandro Émile Zambrano Bailón
- Date of birth: 2 April 1998 (age 28)
- Place of birth: Paris, France
- Height: 1.82 m (6 ft 0 in)
- Position: Striker

Team information
- Current team: Deportivo Cuenca
- Number: 77

Senior career*
| Years | Team | Apps | (Gls) |
| 2015 | Deportivo Quito | 0 | (0) |
| 2016–2021 | El Nacional | 3+ | (5) |
| 2022– | Deportivo Cuenca | 28 | (2) |
| 2023 | → Independiente Juniors (loan) | 17 | (0) |
- * Club domestic league appearances and goals

Mateo Alejandro Émile Zambrano Bailón (born 2 April 1998) is a French footballer who plays as a striker. He currently plays for C.D. Cuenca. Mateo was born in France to an Ecuadorian father and a French mother, therefore, he holds both Ecuadorian and French nationalities.

== Career ==
=== Club career ===
Before the 2016 season, Zambrano signed for Ecuadorian side El Nacional, where he suffered relegation to the Ecuadorian second division. On 3 November 2019, he debuted for El Nacional during a 1–0 win over Macará. On 19 March 2021, Zambrano scored his first goal for El Nacional during a 1–1 draw with América de Quito.

=== International career ===
Zambrano is eligible to represent France internationally through his mother and having been born in Paris. He is the son of Ecuadorian politician Patricio Zambrano.

== Career statistics ==
As of 23 November 2024.

| Club | Season | League | | National Cup | | Continental | | Total | |
| Club | Season | Apps | Goals | Apps | Goals | Apps | Goals | Apps | Goals |
|---|---|---|---|---|---|---|---|---|---|
| Deportivo Quito | 2015 | 0 | 0 | — | | — | | 0 | 0 |
| El Nacional | 2016 | 0 | 0 | — | | — | | 0 | 0 |
| El Nacional | 2017 | 0 | 0 | — | | — | | 0 | 0 |
| El Nacional | 2018 | 0 | 0 | — | | — | | 0 | 0 |
| El Nacional | 2019 | 1 | 0 | 0 | 0 | — | | 1 | 0 |
| El Nacional | 2020 | 2 | 0 | 0 | 0 | — | | 2 | 0 |
| El Nacional | 2021 | 16 | 5 | 0 | 0 | — | | 16 | 5 |
| El Nacional | Total | 19 | 5 | 0 | 0 | 0 | 0 | 19 | 5 |
| Deportivo Cuenca | 2022 | 25 | 2 | 0 | 0 | — | | 25 | 2 |
| Independiente Juniors | 2023 | 32 | 4 | — | | — | | 32 | 4 |
| Deportivo Cuenca | 2024 | 7 | 0 | 0 | 0 | — | | 7 | 0 |
| Deportivo Cuenca | Total | 32 | 2 | 0 | 0 | 0 | 0 | 32 | 2 |
| Career total | | 83 | 11 | 0 | 0 | 0 | 0 | 83 | 11 |
