= Luis Cano =

Ecuadorian footballer (born 1999)

Personal information
- Full name: Luis Ángel Cano Quintana
- Date of birth: 5 September 1999 (age 27)
- Place of birth: Vinces, Ecuador
- Height: 1.67 m (5 ft 6 in)
- Position: Attacking midfielder

Team information
- Current team: Barcelona
- Number: 16

Youth career
- Ciudad del Norte

Senior career*
Years	Team	Apps	(Gls)
2016	Ciudad del Norte		
2017	Fiorentina FC		
2017–2018	Santa Rita	73	(6)
2019	Independiente del Valle	0	(0)
2020	Guayaquil City	25	(5)
2021–2026	Aucas	109	(23)
2026–	Barcelona	4	(0)

International career
2018–2019	Ecuador U-20		
- * Club domestic league appearances and goals as of 19 March 2026

Luis Ángel Cano Quintana (born 5 September 1999) is an Ecuadorian footballer who plays as an attacking midfielder for Ecuadorian Serie A club Barcelona.

== Career ==
=== Club career ===
Cano began his career at the local club Ciudad del Norte in Vinces. He made his debut for the clubs U-17 team in 2013 at the age of only 13. He played for the club until he moved to Fiorentina FC, also from his hometown Vinces, ahead of the 2017 season.

He then moved to Ecuadorian Serie B club CD Santa Rita later in 2017, where he made 73 appearances and scored six times over two seasons at the age of 17–18. Ahead of the 2019 season, Cano then joined Ecuadorian Serie A club Independiente del Valle. However, he only played for official games for the clubs reserve team in the Serie B, before leaving the club at the end of 2019.

Ahead of the 2020 season, Cano moved to Guayaquil City. He made 25 league appearances for the club and scored five goals. Ahead of the 2021 season, Cano joined fellow league club S.D. Aucas.

== International career ==
During 2018, Cano was summoned to the Ecuador U-20 squad several times.

In August 2018, Cano was in the starting line up for the Ecuador national team in a friendly match against the Ecuador U-20 team.

== Career statistics ==
=== Club ===
As of 1 June 2025

Club	Season	League		Cup		Continental		Total	
Club	Season	Apps	Goals	Apps	Goals	Apps	Goals	Apps	Goals
Ciudad del Norte	2016	15	13	—		—		15	13
Santa Rita	2017	43	4	—		—		43	4
Santa Rita	2018	30	2	—		—		30	2
Santa Rita	Total	73	6	—		—		73	6
Independiente Juniors	2019	31	3	5	2	—		36	5
Guayaquil City	2020	25	5	0	0	0	0	25	5
Aucas	2021	18	2	0	0	4	2	22	4
Aucas	2022	26	5	2	0	—		28	5
Aucas	2023	24	4	0	0	5	0	29	4
Aucas	2024	25	7	2	1	2	0	29	8
Aucas	2025	7	1	0	0	0	0	7	1
Aucas	Total	100	19	4	1	11	2	115	22
Career total		244	46	9	3	11	2	264	51

== Honours ==
Aucas

- Ecuadorian Serie A: 2022
