= Patricio Hurtado =

Ecuadorian footballer and coach (born 1970)

Personal information
- Full name: Edwin Patricio Hurtado Zurita
- Date of birth: 9 August 1970 (age 56)
- Place of birth: Pillaro, Ecuador
- Position: Forward

Team information
- Current team: LDU Quito (scout)

Senior career*
Years	Team	Apps	(Gls)
1990–1993	El Nacional	104	(27)
1994–2002	LDU Quito	235	(69)
2001	→ Macará (loan)	18	(6)
2003–2004	Técnico Universitario	64	(9)
2005	Tungurahua	14	(2)
2006–2007	UTE	31	(16)
Total		466	(129)

International career
1991–2000	Ecuador	3	(0)

Managerial career
- 2016–2018: Técnico Universitario
- 2018–2022: América de Ambato
- 2022: Cumbayá (assistant)
- 2022–2023: Cumbayá
- 2024: LDU Quito (interim)
- 2025: LDU Quito (interim)
- 2026: LDU Quito (interim)
- * Club domestic league appearances and goals

Edwin Patricio Hurtado Zurita (born 9 August 1970) is an Ecuadorian football coach and former player who played as a forward. He is the current scout of LDU Quito.

== Career ==
Hurtado began his career with El Nacional in 1990, he also played for L.D.U. Quito, Macará, Técnico Universitario, Tungurahua SC and UTE.

He has been LDU Quito caretaker manager three times. The first time was in 2024, following the departure of Spaniard Josep Alcácer. The second time was in 2025, after the dismissal of Argentinian Pablo Sánchez. The third time was in 2026, after the departure of Brazilian Tiago Nunes.

== Honours ==
=== As a player ===
- El Nacional
  - Ecuadorian Serie A: 1992
- L.D.U. Quito
  - Ecuadorian Serie A: 1998, 1999

=== As a manager ===
- Técnico Universitario
  - Ecuadorian Serie B: 2017
