= Franco Ratotti =

Argentine footballer

Personal information
- Full name: Yair Franco Ratotti
- Date of birth: 13 July 2005 (age 21)
- Place of birth: Santa Fe, Argentina
- Height: 1.83 m (6 ft 0 in)
- Position: Striker

Team information
- Current team: Unión Española (on loan from Unión Santa Fe)

Youth career
- Unión Santa Fe

Senior career*
Years	Team	Apps	(Gls)
2025–	Unión Santa Fe	0	(0)
2025	→ Unión Española (loan)	10	(1)
2026	→ Delfín (loan)	8	(0)
2026–	→ Unión Española (loan)	0	(0)
- * Club domestic league appearances and goals as of 10 July 2026

Yair Franco Ratotti (born 13 July 2005), known as Franco Ratotti, is an Argentine footballer who plays as a striker for Chilean club Unión Española on loan from Unión Santa Fe.

== Club career ==
Born in Santa Fe, Argentina, Ratotti was trained at Unión de Santa Fe. After standing out with the first team in the 2025 Copa Santa Fe winning the title, he signed his first professional contract on 6 August 2025. Two days later, he moved to Chile and joined on loan to Unión Española in the Chilean Primera División on a deal for a year with an option to return in December 2025. He scored his first goal and made an assist in the 4–2 win against Huachipato on 12 October.

In the first half of 2026, Ratotti was sent on loan to Ecuadorian club Delfín. He rejoined Unión Española for the second half of the year in the Liga de Ascenso.

== Honours ==
Unión Santa Fe

- Copa Santa Fe: 2025
