= Sociedad Deportiva Flamengo =

Ecuadorian football club

Flamengo
- Full name: Sociedad Deportiva Flamengo
- Nicknames: El Fla Latacungueño; Los Flamenguinos; Los Rojinegros
- Founded: December 29, 1923; 101 years ago
- Ground: La Cocha, Latacunga, Ecuador
- Capacity: 15,000
- League: Segunda Categoría
Home colours	Away colours

Sociedad Deportiva Flamengo, commonly known just as Flamengo, are an Ecuadorian football team from Latacunga, Cotopaxi province. They are currently competing in the Segunda Categoría.

== History ==
Sociedad Deportiva Flamengo were founded in 1923. The club took inspiration in their name and colors from Clube de Regatas do Flamengo, of Rio de Janeiro, Brazil.

== Stadium ==
Flamengo play their home games at Estadio La Cocha. The stadium has a maximum capacity of 15,000 people.
