= Club Social, Cultural y Deportivo Brasilia =

Ecuadorian football club

Brasilia
- Full name: Club Social, Cultural y Deportivo Brasilia
- Founded: July 19, 1985; 39 years ago
- Ground: Estadio Pascual Mina; Quinindé, Ecuador
- Capacity: 4.000
- Chairman: Marco Vélez Plaza
- League: Segunda Categoría
- 2008: Serie B, 10th (relegated)
| Home colours | Away colours |

Club Social, Cultural y Deportivo Brasilia is a football club based in Quinindé, Ecuador.
