= Igor Oca =

Spanish football manager

Personal information
- Full name: Igor Oca Pulido
- Date of birth: 7 May 1981 (age 45)
- Place of birth: Basauri, Spain

Managerial career
- Years: Team
- 2011–2016: Levante (youth)
- 2016–2017: Atlético Madrid (youth)
- 2017: Alavés (youth)
- 2017–2019: Alavés B
- 2019–2020: Atlético San Luis (assistant)
- 2020–2021: Sestao
- 2021–2022: Emelec (assistant)
- 2022: Independiente Juniors (caretaker)
- 2023: Universidad Católica del Ecuador
- 2024: Deportivo Cuenca
- 2024: Huachipato
- 2025: Sestao
- 2025: Leganés B
- 2025–2026: Leganés

Igor Oca Pulido (born 7 May 1981) is a Spanish football manager.

== Career ==
Born in Basauri, Biscay, Basque Country, Oca began his managerial career with Levante UD's Juvenil D side in 2011, after previously working as a fitness coach for the youth teams of Villarreal CF, Real Sociedad and Athletic Bilbao. On 5 June 2014, he was named in charge of the Juvenil A squad of the former.

On 8 July 2016, Oca was appointed manager of Atlético Madrid's Juvenil División de Honor team. Ahead of the 2017–18 season, he initially took over Deportivo Alavés' Juvenil A squad, before replacing Aitor Orueta at the helm of the reserves on 3 October 2017.

Oca was dismissed by the Miniglorias on 4 March 2019, being replaced by Iñaki Alonso. On 30 May, he moved abroad after being named assistant manager of Mexican club Atlético San Luis, being also in charge of their under-20 team.

Oca returned to his home country on 8 December 2020, after being appointed in charge of Tercera División side Sestao River Club. The following 15 June, after achieving promotion to Segunda División RFEF, he left the club.

On 25 August 2021, Oca moved to Ecuador and joined Ismael Rescalvo's staff at Emelec, as his assistant. On 24 March of the following year, he moved to fellow league team Independiente del Valle, as the new Head of Youth Football. He was also a caretaker coach of the reserve team for three months in that year.

On 28 November 2022, Oca returned to managerial duties after being named manager of Universidad Católica del Ecuador. Despite qualifying the club to the 2024 Copa Sudamericana, he left on 5 December 2023 as his contract was not renewed.

On 22 April 2024, Oca was named manager of Deportivo Cuenca, also in the Ecuadorian top tier. On 18 July, he left the club by mutual consent, and took over Huachipato in the Chilean Primera División seven days later. On 14 November 2024, Oca left Huachipato following the expiration of his contract.

On 6 March 2025, Oca returned to Sestao for a second spell in charge, with the side now in the Primera Federación; he replaced the sacked Ángel Viadero. He left on 4 June, as his contract was due to expire, and took over CD Leganés' reserves sixteen days later.

On 5 December 2025, Oca was named caretaker manager of Lega, after Paco López was sacked. On 24 December, he was confirmed as manager of the side for the remainder of the season.

On 26 May 2026, with Leganés still under threat of relegation, Oca was himself dismissed.

== Managerial statistics ==
As of 31 May 2026

Managerial record by team and tenure
Team	Nat	From	To	Record								Ref
Team	Nat	From	To	G	W	D	L	GF	GA	GD	Win %	Ref
Alavés B	(Spain)	3 October 2017	4 March 2019	65	30	21	14	106	63	+43	46.15	
Sestao River	(Spain)	7 December 2020	15 June 2021	22	16	3	3	44	12	+32	72.73	
Independiente Juniors (interim)	(Ecuador)	1 March 2022	11 June 2022	17	7	4	6	12	14	−2	41.18	
Universidad Católica del Ecuador	(Ecuador)	28 November 2022	5 December 2023	32	12	11	9	38	39	−1	37.50	
Deportivo Cuenca	(Ecuador)	22 April 2024	18 July 2024	6	3	2	1	14	6	+8	50.00	
Huachipato	(Chile)	25 July 2024	14 November 2024	22	8	3	11	33	37	−4	36.36	
Sestao River	(Spain)	6 March 2025	4 June 2025	12	4	4	4	17	17	+0	33.33	
Leganés B	(Spain)	20 June 2025	5 December 2025	12	6	5	1	29	8	+21	50.00	
Leganés	(Spain)	5 December 2025	26 May 2026	26	7	7	12	27	33	−6	26.92	
Total				214	93	60	61	320	229	+91	43.46	—
