= Nicolás Chietino =

Argentine footballer and manager

Personal information
- Full name: Nicolás Alejandro Chietino
- Date of birth: 17 April 1982 (age 44)
- Place of birth: Longchamps, Argentina
- Height: 1.83 m (6 ft 0 in)
- Position: Defensive midfielder

Team information
- Current team: Deportivo Llacuabamba (manager)

Youth career
- Argentinos Juniors

Senior career*
| Years | Team | Apps | (Gls) |
| 2002–2003 | Argentinos Juniors | 0 | (0) |
| 2003–2004 | Racing Ferrol | 18 | (0) |
| 2004–2005 | Novelda | 29 | (1) |
| 2005–2007 | Melilla | 72 | (0) |
| 2007–2008 | Algeciras | 20 | (2) |
| 2008 | Hospitalet | 14 | (0) |
| 2008–2010 | Marbella | 60 | (3) |
| 2010–2011 | Temperley | 39 | (0) |
| 2011–2012 | Villanovense | 17 | (3) |
| 2012–2013 | Burgos | 49 | (1) |
| 2013–2015 | Mérida | 45 | (1) |
| 2015 | Pogoń Siedlce | 10 | (0) |
| 2015–2016 | Lincoln Red Imps | 8 | (0) |
| 2016 | Unión Aconquija | 18 | (0) |
| 2016–2017 | Colegiales | 4 | (0) |
| Total | | 403 | (11) |

Managerial career
- 2006–2007: Melilla (youth)
- 2017–2018: Kairat (assistant)
- 2019: Universidad Católica del Ecuador (reserves)
- 2019: Fénix (assistant)
- 2020: Santamarina (assistant)
- 2021: León de Huánuco
- 2021: Comerciantes Unidos
- 2022: Huracán (assistant)
- 2022–2023: Lanús (assistant)
- 2024: Orense
- 2025: Delfín
- 2026–: Deportivo Llacuabamba
- * Club domestic league appearances and goals

Nicolás Alejandro Chietino (born 17 April 1982) is an Argentine football manager and former player who played as a defensive midfielder. He is the current manager of Peruvian club Deportivo Llacuabamba.

== Playing career ==
Born in Longchamps, Buenos Aires Province, Chietino played youth football for Argentinos Juniors, but failed to make a first team appearance for the club. In August 2003, after a trial period, he signed for Spanish Segunda División B side Racing de Ferrol.

After helping Racing in their promotion to Segunda División, Chietino moved to Novelda CF in the third tier in 2004. He continued to appear in that category in the following five years, representing UD Melilla, Algeciras CF, CE L'Hospitalet and UD Marbella.

In 2010, Chietino returned to his home country to join Temperley. He returned to Spain and its third tier in the following year, signing for CF Villanovense.

On 3 January 2012, Chietino agreed to a contract with Burgos CF, also in the third tier. He was a regular starter during his spell, suffering relegation in his first season but achieving promotion back in his second.

Ahead of the 2013–14 campaign, Chietino joined newly created side Mérida AD in Tercera División. He left in January 2015 to move to Poland; initially expecting to sign for Ekstraklasa side Pogoń Szczecin, he instead signed for I liga side MKP Pogoń Siedlce.

In June 2015, Chietino switched teams and countries again, after agreeing to a deal with Gibraltar Premier Division side Lincoln Red Imps FC. After leaving the club in 2016, he returned to his home country and played for Unión Aconquija and Colegiales before retiring in 2017, aged 35.

== Managerial career ==
After retiring, Chietino worked as an assistant at FC Kairat before becoming the manager of Universidad Católica del Ecuador's reserve team in 2019. He later returned to his previous role at Fénix and Santamarina, before being named manager of León de Huánuco on 11 March 2021.

On 22 July 2021, Chietino took over Comerciantes Unidos also in Peru. After four winless matches, he was sacked in August, and subsequently worked as an assistant of Frank Darío Kudelka at Huracán and Lanús.

On 18 December 2023, Chietino returned to Ecuador after being named manager of Orense for the upcoming season. He left the club by mutual consent the following 5 May, and took over fellow league team Delfín on 6 January 2025.

Chietino resigned from Delfín in April 2025.
