= Libertad F.C. (Ecuador) =

Ecuadorian football club

Libertad
- Full name: Libertad Fútbol Club
- Nickname: Libertario
- Founded: 17 May 2017; 9 years ago
- Ground: Reina del Cisne
- Capacity: 14,935
- Chairman: Marlon Granda
- Manager: Juan Pablo Buch
- League: Ecuadorian Serie A
- 2025: First stage: 6th of 16; First hexagonal: 6th of 6
- Website: https://www.libertadfutbolclub.com/
Home colours	Away colours	Third colours

Libertad Fútbol Club is an Ecuadorian professional football club from the city of Loja. Founded on 17 May 2017, it plays in the Serie A.

== History ==
Founded on 17 May 2017 as Independiente Fútbol Club de Pindal, the club played in the Segunda Categoría de Loja in the 2018 season, In 2019, the club qualified for the national phase of the Segunda Categoría, being knocked out in the group stage.

Ahead of the 2020 campaign, Independiente changed its name to Libertad Fútbol Club, winning the tournament in Loja but still being knocked out early in the Segunda Categoría. After a second consecutive title in Loja in 2021, Libertad achieved promotion to the Serie B as champions.

In the 2022 Serie B, their first-ever season in the second level, Libertad won an immediate promotion to the Serie A, finishing in third place but benefitting from Independiente Juniors' ineligibility for promotion.

== Achievements ==
- Segunda Categoría
  - Winner (1): 2021

== Players ==
As of 20 August 2025

=== Current squad ===
Note: Flags indicate national team as defined under FIFA eligibility rules; some limited exceptions apply. Players may hold more than one non-FIFA nationality.

No.	Pos.	Nation	Player
5	DF	ECU	Carlos Gruezo
6	DF	ECU	Bryan Caicedo
7	MF	ECU	Ivan Zambrano
8	DF	ECU	Stick Castro
9	FW	ECU	Enrique Caicedo
10	MF	ECU	Gabriel Cortez
11	FW	ECU	Hancel Batalla
12	GK	ECU	David Cabezas
16	FW	ECU	Jhon Cifuente
17	MF	ECU	Elvis Patta
19	MF	ECU	Bryan Corozo
20	DF	ECU	Jackson Rodriguez

No.	Pos.	Nation	Player
22	GK	ECU	Felix Mina
23	MF	ECU	Jawer Guisamano
25	DF	ECU	Manuel Lucas
27	MF	ECU	Sander Bueno
29	DF	ECU	Rody Zambrano
30	MF	ECU	Jostin Bravo (on loan from IDV)
33	FW	ECU	Antony Chere
36	DF	ECU	Ariel García (on loan from Delfín)
54	DF	ECU	Wagner Bardales
63	MF	ECU	Cristian Valencia
66	GK	ECU	Johan Estacio
70	FW	ECU	Vilington Branda
