= Sebastián Blázquez =

Argentine footballer

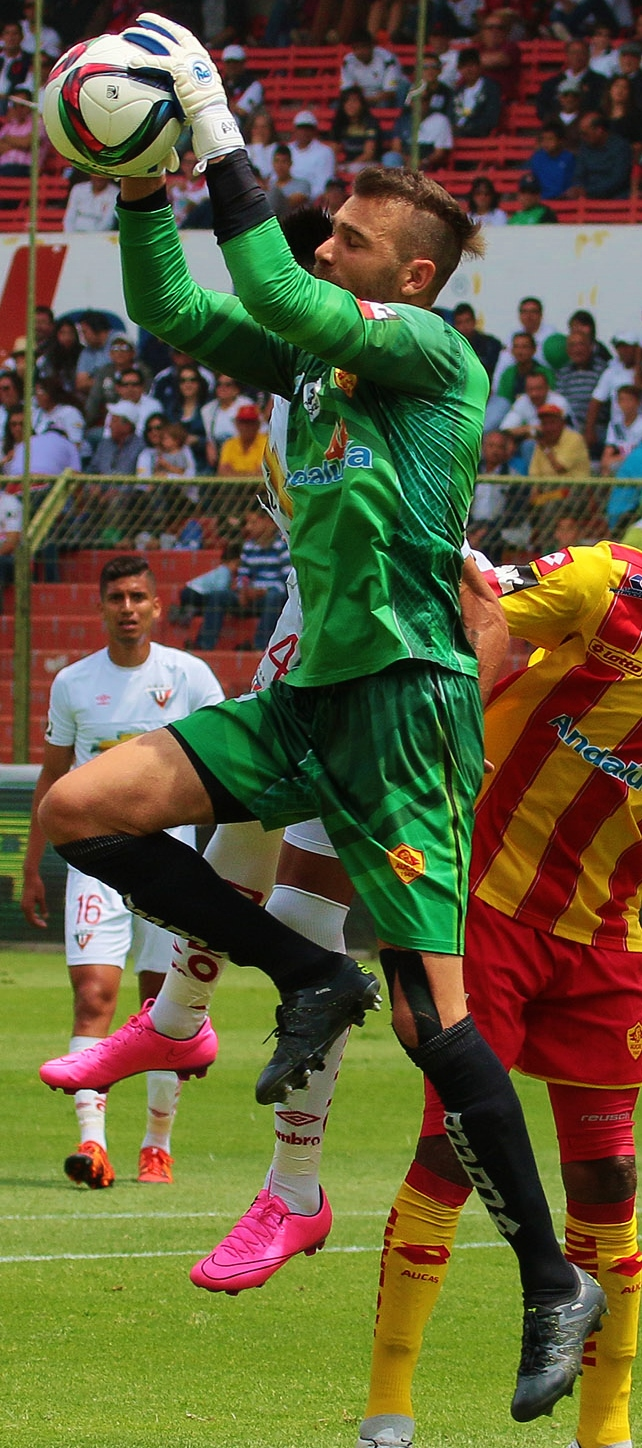
- Sebastián Blázquez in 2015

Personal information
- Full name: Sebastián Alberto Blázquez Tosso
- Date of birth: 27 November 1979 (age 46)
- Place of birth: Bahía Blanca, Argentina
- Height: 1.84 m (6 ft 0 in)
- Position: Goalkeeper

Team information
- Current team: Deportivo Quito (manager)

Senior career*
Years	Team	Apps	(Gls)
1997–2002	Talleres RE	52	(0)
2002–2004	Vélez Sársfield	1	(0)
2004–2006	San Martín SJ	4	(0)
2006–2008	Colón	40	(0)
2009	→ Deportivo Cali (loan)	34	(0)
2010	→ Olimpia (loan)	8	(0)
2010–2012	Patronato	7	(0)
2012–2013	Técnico Universitario	44	(1)
2013	Independiente Rivadavia	1	(0)
2013–2014	Belgrano	4	(0)
2014–2015	Mushuc Runa	41	(0)
2015–2016	Aucas	70	(0)
2017–2018	Villa Dálmine	3	(0)
2018–2019	Deportivo Laferrere	39	(0)

Managerial career
- 2023–2024: Aucas (youth)
- 2024: Aucas
- 2025–: Deportivo Quito
- * Club domestic league appearances and goals

Sebastián Alberto Blázquez (born 27 November 1979) is an Argentine football manager and former player who played as a goalkeeper. He is the current manager of Ecuadorian club Deportivo Quito.

== Career ==
Blázquez started his playing career in 1997 with Talleres de Remedios de Escalada in the Regionalised 3rd division of Argentine football. In 2002, he was signed by Vélez Sársfield of the Argentine Primera, but he only made one competitive appearance in his two years with the club.

In 2004 Blázquez joined San Martín de San Juan of the 2nd division and in 2006 he returned to the Primera with Colón de Santa Fe where he was again used as a reserve goalkeeper until he got a run in the first team in late 2007. In 2009 played in Colombia for Deportivo Cali, before on 29 December 2009 the Goalkeeper left Cali to join Olimpia Asuncion on a 50% joint ownership deal with Colón de Santa Fe.

On 27 November 2019, 40-year old Blázquez announced his retirement from football.
