= Diego Chamorro =

Ecuadorian footballer and manager (born 1994)

Personal information
- Full name: Diego Alexander Chamorro Morales
- Date of birth: 24 July 1994 (age 32)
- Place of birth: Ecuador
- Position: Forward

Youth career
- 2011: América de Quito

Senior career*
Years	Team	Apps	(Gls)
- Titan

Managerial career
- 2021: Concordia (assistant)
- 2021–2022: Sancor (assistant)
- 2022: Liverpool Pichincha
- 2023: Independiente JFA
- 2024: Cumbayá U17
- 2024: Cumbayá
- * Club domestic league appearances and goals

Diego Alexander Chamorro Morales (born 24 July 1994) is an Ecuadorian football manager and former player who played as a forward.

== Playing career ==
Chamorro played for América de Quito as a youth, but subsequently featured in the amateur leagues, notably playing for Titan.

== Managerial career ==
In 2021, after being a sporting instructor in the Secretariat of Sports in Quito, Chamorro became an assistant at Concordia SC. He later worked at Sancor under the same role, before having his first managerial experience with Liverpool Pichincha in 2022.

In 2023, Chamorro was in charge of Independiente del Valle's affiliate side Independiente JFA, qualifying the side to the upcoming Segunda Categoría de Pichincha. In 2024, he became a manager of the under-17 side of Cumbayá.

On 4 October 2024, Chamorro was named manager of Cumbayá's first team, after a new board was established.
