= Club Deportivo Saquisilí =

Ecuadorian football club

Deportivo Saquisilí
- Full name: Club Deportivo Saquisilí
- Nicknames: "Auriverdes", "Amarillentos"
- Founded: 1982; 43 years ago
- Ground: Estadio de Liga Deportiva Cantonal de Saquisilí, Saquisilí, Cotopaxi, Ecuador
- Capacity: 3,000
- League: Segunda Categoría
Home colours	Away colours

The Club Deportivo Saquisilí was a soccer club based in the Saquisilí parish, north of Latacunga in Cotopaxi, Ecuador. It was the champion of the Ecuadorian Segunda Categoría (the country's football third division) in 1999.
