= Juan Carlos León =

Ecuadorian footballer and manager (born 1975)

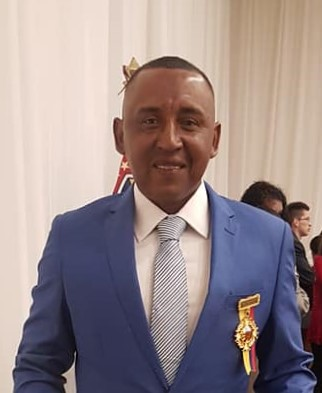
- León in 2019

Personal information
- Full name: Juan Carlos León Zambrano
- Date of birth: 24 January 1975 (age 51)
- Place of birth: Esmeraldas, Ecuador
- Position: Midfielder

Team information
- Current team: Delfín (manager)

Youth career
- Barcelona SC
- Calvi

Senior career*
Years	Team	Apps	(Gls)
1999	Audaz Octubrino	15	(0)
2000	Panamá	8	(0)
2001	Santos Ecuador	6	(2)
2002	Valle del Chota	10	(1)
2003	Paladín "S"	0	(0)
2004	9 de Octubre	0	(0)
2006	Liceo Cristiano	0	(0)

Managerial career
- Barcelona SC (youth)
- 2009: Norte América (youth)
- 2009–2018: Independiente del Valle (youth)
- 2018–2019: Independiente Juniors
- 2020–2022: 9 de Octubre
- 2022–2023: Orense
- 2024: 9 de Octubre
- 2024–2026: Libertad FC
- 2026–: Delfín
- * Club domestic league appearances and goals

Juan Carlos León Zambrano (born 24 January 1975) is an Ecuadorian football manager and former player who played as a midfielder. He is the current manager of Delfín.

== Career ==
Born in Esmeraldas, León represented Barcelona SC, Calvi as a youth. After making his senior debut with Audaz Octubrino in 1999, he went on to play for Panamá, Santos Ecuador, Valle del Chota, Paladín "S", 9 de Octubre and Liceo Cristiano.

After retiring, León worked for Barcelona and Norte América's youth categories before joining Independiente del Valle in the middle of 2009. After winning several titles with the under-16s and under-18s, he led the under-20s to the 2018 U-20 Copa Libertadores final, and was later named in charge of reserve team Alianza Cotopaxi for the 2018 Segunda Categoría.

After winning the Segunda Categoría and promoting Alianza (later named Independiente Juniors) to the Serie B, León renewed his contract with the club. On 2 January 2020, he was appointed manager of former team 9 de Octubre in the second division, and led the side back to the Serie A after a 25-year absence, also winning the title for the first time.

On 2 August 2022, León was sacked by 9 de Octubre, and took over fellow top tier side Orense eleven days later. He left the latter on 3 December, after narrowly missing out a continental spot.

León returned to 9 de Octubre for the 2024 season, but was appointed at the helm of Libertad FC on 19 April of that year. He qualified the club to the 2026 Copa Sudamericana, their first-ever continental competition, but resigned on 3 May 2026, and took over Delfín on 9 June.

== Honours ==
Independiente Juniors

- Segunda Categoría: 2018

9 de Octubre

- Ecuadorian Serie B: 2020
