= Martín Wainer =

Argentine football manager (born 1993)

Personal information
- Date of birth: 2 July 1993 (age 33)
- Place of birth: Argentina

Managerial career
- Years: Team
- 2018–2019: Emelec (assistant)
- 2019–2020: Defensa y Justicia (assistant)
- 2020–2021: San Lorenzo (assistant)
- 2022: O'Higgins (assistant)
- 2024: Imbabura

Martín Wainer (born 2 July 1993) is an Argentine football manager.

== Career ==
Wainer began his career as a scout, notably working for Bayer 04 Leverkusen before joining Mariano Soso's staff at Gimnasia La Plata in 2017, as a technical secretary. He followed Soso to Emelec, Defensa y Justicia, San Lorenzo and O'Higgins, now as his assistant.

In 2023, Wainer was a member of Lucas Pusineri's staff at Tigre. On 8 July 2024, he was presented as manager of Ecuadorian Serie A side Imbabura, replacing Joe Armas, but was sacked in less than two months in charge.

== Personal life ==
Wainer's father Gabriel and brother Javi are involved with football: the former worked as a technical secretary for several national teams, while the latter is a scout at Roma.
