= Manta F.C. =

Ecuadorian football club

Manta FC
- Full name: Club Deportivo Especializado Dedicado a la Práctica del Deporte Profesional Manta Fútbol Club
- Nicknames: Celestes (Sky blues); Pesqueros (Fishermen); Atuneros (Tuna fishermen)
- Founded: 27 July 1998; 28 years ago
- Ground: Estadio Jocay
- Capacity: 21,000
- Chairman: Guillermo Medranda
- Manager: Raúl Duarte
- League: Serie A
- 2025: First stage: 16th of 16; Relegation group: 1st of 4
- Website: http://www.mantafutbolclub.com/
Home colours	Away colours	Third colours

Manta Fútbol Club is a professional football club from the city of Manta, Ecuador. Founded in 1998, they play in Serie A.

== History ==
Manta was founded in 1998 after the purchase of the franchise rights from the defunct Manta Sport. From 1999 to 2001, the club competed in the Segunda Categoría, the third tier of Ecuadorian football league system before being promoted in 2002 to Serie B. Manta won promotion again in 2003 to Serie A for the first time but finished poorly and were relegated back to Serie B where they would spend the next six seasons. 2009 saw the club back in Serie A but no titles were forthcoming and they were relegated again in 2014.

They got promoted back to the Serie A in 2020 played in the first tier after a seven-year absence. After one season, they suffered another relegation, only returning to the top tier in 2024 after finishing second in the year's Serie B.

== Honours ==
- Serie B
  - Champions (1): 2008

== Players ==
As of 7 April 2025

Note: Flags indicate national team as defined under FIFA eligibility rules; some limited exceptions apply. Players may hold more than one non-FIFA nationality.

No.	Pos.	Nation	Player
1	GK	ECU	Wálter Chávez
4	DF	ECU	Jefferson Nazareno
5	MF	ARG	Braian Ramírez
6	MF	COL	Juan David Jimenez
7	MF	ECU	Danny Cabezas
8	MF	ECU	Maikel Valencia
9	FW	COL	Jean Carlos Blanco
10	MF	ECU	Robert Burbano
11	MF	NGR	Feyiseitan Asagidigbi
12	GK	ECU	Felix Zambrano
14	DF	ECU	Jeremy Mina
16	DF	ECU	Dagner Quintero

No.	Pos.	Nation	Player
17	FW	ECU	José Enrique Angulo
18	MF	ARG	Exequiel Beltramone
19	FW	ECU	Jostin Alman
20	DF	ECU	Josué Chalá
21	MF	ECU	Mateo Ortíz
23	DF	ECU	Alexander Medina
24	DF	ARG	Octavio Moscarelli
31	DF	ECU	Glendys Mina
33	FW	ECU	Anderson Castillo
70	MF	ECU	Juan Nazareno
99	GK	ECU	Estefano Pico

== Managers ==
- (Argentina) Fabián Bustos (2009–2010)
- (Argentina) Gabriel Perrone (2010–2011)
- (Colombia) Armando Osma (2011–2012)
- (Ecuador) Edwin Cózar (2012–2013)
- (Argentina) Fabián Bustos (2013)
- (Argentina) Juan Manuel Llop (2014)
- (Colombia) Armando Osma (2014)
- (Argentina) Jorge Alfonso (2014–2015)
- (Argentina) Juan Amador Sánchez (2015)
- (Ecuador) Luis Espinel (2016)
- (Argentina) Jorge Alfonso (2017)
- (Paraguay) Rolando Azas (2017–2018)
- (Argentina) (Ecuador) Pablo Saucedo (2019)
- (Argentina) Fabián Frías (2019–2021)
- (Spain) (Argentina) Pablo Trobbiani (2022)
