= Josep Alcácer =

Spanish football manager

Personal information
- Full name: Josep Alcácer Alcocer
- Date of birth: 9 September 1979 (age 47)
- Place of birth: Llíria, Spain
- Position: Midfielder

Team information
- Current team: Valencia (assistant)

Youth career
- Llíria

Senior career*
Years	Team	Apps	(Gls)
- Llíria

Managerial career
- 1998–2002: Llíria (youth)
- 2002–2006: Levante (women)
- 2008–2009: Castellón (assistant)
- 2010–2012: Sporting Gijón (assistant)
- 2012–2015: Elche (assistant)
- 2015–2016: Getafe (assistant)
- 2016–2017: Villarreal (assistant)
- 2020–2021: Alcorcón B
- 2022: Granada (assistant)
- 2024: LDU Quito
- 2025–: Valencia (assistant)
- * Club domestic league appearances and goals

Josep Alcácer Alcocer (born 9 September 1979) is a Spanish football manager and former player who played as a midfielder. He is the current assistant manager of Valencia CF.

== Career ==
Born in Llíria, Valencian Community, Alcácer played for Llíria and started his managerial career in the club's youth categories. On 15 July 2003, after being in charge of the women's under-17 and under-25 teams of the Valencian Football Federation, he took over the women's team of Levante.

Alcácer left the Granotes on 23 June 2006, after winning two Copa de la Reina de Fútbol titles. In July 2008, he became Abel Resino's assistant at Castellón, and remained at the club until July 2009, despite Resino's departure to Atlético Madrid.

On 15 June 2010, after working with Paco Herrera at Villarreal B, Alcácer became Manuel Preciado's assistant at Sporting Gijón. In the following years, he worked under the same role with Fran Escribá at Elche, Getafe and Villarreal.

On 29 August 2020, Alcácer was appointed manager of Alcorcón B in the Tercera División. In July 2021, after missing out promotion in the play-offs, he left.

In April 2022, Alcácer returned to assistant duties after joining Aitor Karanka's staff at Granada. In November, after the manager's dismissal, he also left the club.

On 8 January 2024, it was announced that Alcácer was chosen as manager of Ecuadorian Serie A side LDU Quito, replacing Luis Zubeldía. He left by mutual consent on 23 May, after five winless matches.

On 2 January 2025, Alcácer returned to his home country and joined Carlos Corberán's staff at Valencia CF, as his assistant.

== Managerial statistics ==
As of 22 May 2024

Managerial record by team and tenure
Team	Nat	From	To	Record								Ref
Team	Nat	From	To	G	W	D	L	GF	GA	GD	Win %	Ref
Levante (women)	(Spain)	15 July 2003	23 June 2006	117	84	16	17	366	79	+287	71.79	
Alcorcón B	(Spain)	29 August 2020	1 July 2021	28	12	9	7	39	22	+17	42.86	
LDU Quito	(Ecuador)	8 January 2024	23 May 2024	18	9	3	6	27	20	+7	50.00	
Total				163	105	28	30	432	121	+311	64.42	—

== Honours ==
Levante (women)

- Copa de la Reina de Fútbol: 2004, 2005
