= Armando Osma =

Colombian footballer (1961–2025)

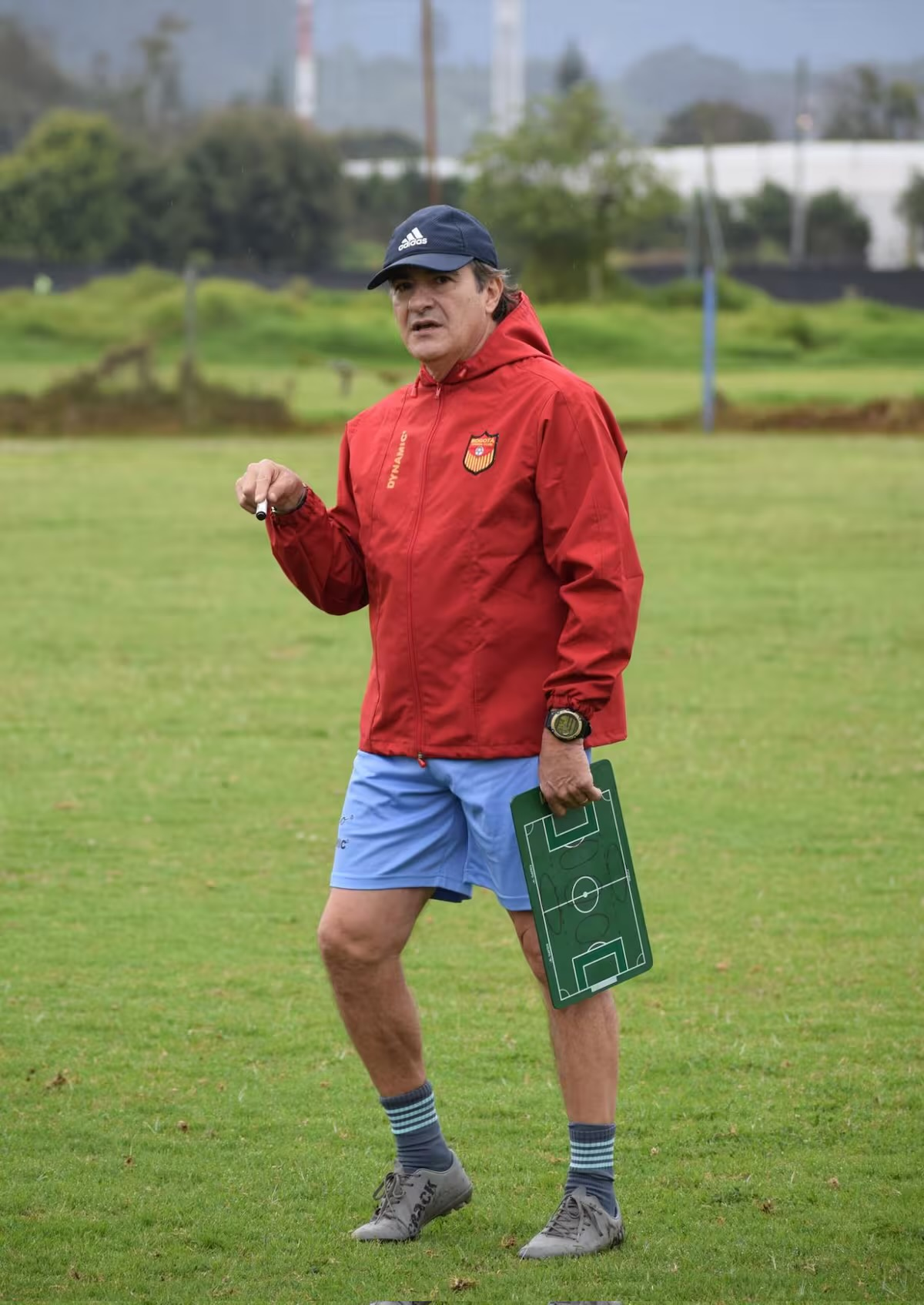
- Osma in 2023

Personal information
- Full name: Armando Osma Rueda
- Date of birth: 7 December 1961
- Place of birth: Bucaramanga, Colombia
- Date of death: 28 March 2025 (aged 63)
- Position: Forward

Youth career
- Atlético Bucaramanga

Senior career*
Years	Team	Apps	(Gls)
1981–1983	Atlético Bucaramanga		
1983–1984	Once Caldas	61	(16)
1985–1990	Deportivo Cali	169	(59)
1992–1993	Deportes Tolima	83	(30)
1994–1995	Millonarios	45	(14)
1995–1996	Cortuluá	48	(19)
1996–1997	Atlético Bucaramanga		

Managerial career
- 1999–2001: Deportivo Cali (youth)
- 2002: Deportes Tolima (assistant)
- 2003–2004: Aucas (assistant)
- 2004–2007: Ecuador (assistant)
- 2007: Ecuador U23
- 2008: Olmedo
- 2009: Aucas
- 2009–2010: Juan Aurich (assistant)
- 2011–2012: Manta
- 2013: Macará
- 2014: Manta
- 2015: El Nacional (youth)
- 2016–2017: Aucas
- 2017–2018: La Equidad (assistant)
- 2019: Junior (assistant)
- 2021: Águila
- 2021: América de Quito
- 2022: Atlético Bucaramanga
- 2023: Bogotá
- 2024: Cumbayá
- * Club domestic league appearances and goals

Armando Osma Rueda (7 December 1961 – 28 March 2025) was a Colombian football manager and player who played as a forward.

== Playing career ==
Born in Bucaramanga, Osma began his career with hometown side Atlético Bucaramanga in 1981. He subsequently represented Once Caldas, Deportivo Cali, Deportes Tolima, Millonarios and Cortuluá before returning to his first club in 1996. He retired in 1997, aged 36.

== Managerial career ==
After retiring, Osma began his managerial career with Deportivo Cali's youth categories in 1999. In 2002, he joined Luis Fernando Suárez's staff at Deportes Tolima, and subsequently followed Suárez to Aucas and the Ecuador national team.

In 2007, Osma was also manager of the Ecuador under-23 national team. In the December of that year, he took over Olmedo, but reunited with Suárez in 2009, at Peruvian side Juan Aurich.

In 2011, Osma was named manager of Manta. He took over Macará in April 2013, before returning to Manta in August the following year.

In 2015, Osma was appointed manager of El Nacional's youth categories. In August the following year, he was named at the helm of Aucas, and later rejoined Suárez's staff at La Equidad.

After working with Suárez at Junior, Osma returned to managerial duties in February 2021, with Honduran side Águila. He later returned to Ecuador to take over América de Quito in June of that year, before rejoining his first club Bucaramanga on 24 February 2022, in the place of resigned Néstor Craviotto. He was sacked from Atlético Bucaramanga on 10 October.

On 27 July 2023, he was announced as the new manager of Bogotá in the Colombian second tier competition Categoría Primera B.

== Death ==
On 28 March 2025, Osma died after suffering a heart attack. He was 63. The death happened during a training session with Club Deportivo La Unión at the end.
