= Santiago Escobar =

Colombian footballer and manager (born 1964)

Personal information
- Full name: Santiago Escobar Saldarriaga
- Date of birth: 13 January 1964 (age 62)
- Place of birth: Medellín, Colombia
- Position: Defensive midfielder

Senior career*
Years	Team	Apps	(Gls)
1980–198X	Atlético Nacional		
198X–198X	Deportivo Pereira		
1987–1988	América de Cali		
1989	Sporting Barranquilla		
1991	Millonarios		
1992	Deportivo Pereira		
1992–1993	Deportes Quindío		

Managerial career
- 1998: Deportivo Rionegro
- 2001–2002: Estudiantes de Mérida
- 2005–2006: Atlético Nacional
- 2006: Deportivo Pasto
- 2007: Once Caldas
- 2008: Junior
- 2008–2009: Independiente Medellín
- 2009–2010: Bolívar
- 2010–2012: Atlético Nacional
- 2012–2013: Once Caldas
- 2014–2016: La Equidad
- 2016–2017: Deportivo Táchira
- 2017–2021: Universidad Católica del Ecuador
- 2022: Universidad de Chile
- 2023: Aucas
- 2024–2025: Orense
- * Club domestic league appearances and goals

Santiago Escobar Saldarriaga (born 13 January 1964) is a Colombian football manager and former player who played as a defensive midfielder.

== Club career ==
Born in Medellín, Escobar played football for Atlético Nacional, Deportivo Pereira, América de Cali, Sporting de Barranquilla, Junior de Barranquilla, Millonarios and Deportes Quindío. He also appeared for the Olympic team.

== Coaching career ==
Following his retirement from football, he became a football manager; he is known for leading Atlético Nacional to win the 2005 and 2011 Categoría Primera A. He also won the 2010 Copa Aerosur with Club Bolívar.

== Personal life ==
Escobar is the brother of Andrés Escobar, who was murdered after eliminating Colombia from the 1994 FIFA World Cup by scoring an own goal.
