= Superclásico de Quito =

Ecuadorian football rivalry between Aucas and LDU Quito

- Location: Quito, Ecuador
- Teams: Aucas and LDU Quito
- First meeting: February 11, 1945

The Superclásico de Quito (Spanish: Super Derby of Quito) is a football rivalry between Ecuadorian clubs S. D. Aucas and LDU Quito, both from the capital city of Quito.

== Origins ==
The origins of the Superclásico de Quito began with a relegation/promotion playoff in 1945. In that year's Pichincha tournament, Liga de Quito finished last in the top division, while Aucas finished first in the second division. Another team, Deportivo Ecuador, took part in the playoff, but withdrew after being defeated by Aucas. The first match between Liga and Aucas occurred on February 11, 1945, which ended in a 1–1 tie. A second match, played on February 18, ended in a 2–2 draw. At the end of the 90 minutes, the game was 2–1; the timekeeper ended the match, but the referee did not notice, allowing the game to continue into extra time, where Aucas equalized the score. The public grew livid at the referee's bad call and did not allow extra time to be played. Since the game ended in a draw, the Pichicha football association decided to allow both teams into the first division.

== Record wins ==
- Aucas: 7–0 (March 23, 1947)
- LDU Quito: 8–0 (April 9, 1989)

== Latest match ==
May 20, 2016
19:30 UTC−6:00
Serie A 2016

LDU Quito	2-0	Aucas
Brahian Alemán 36'; Edson Puch 82'	Report

Casa Blanca, Quito
Referee: Roddy Zambrano
