= Segunda Categoría =

Copa Credife Segunda Categoría
- Founded: 1967
- Country: Ecuador
- Confederation: CONMEBOL
- Number of clubs: 162
- Level on pyramid: 3
- Promotion to: Serie B

Ecuadorian Segunda Categoría is the third division of the Ecuadorian Football Federation league system. The league is sometimes referred to as Copa Pilsener Segunda Categoría.

The Ecuadorian 3rd division was established in 1967.

== List of champions ==
Season	Champion (Title count)	Runner-up
1967	Everest (1); Deportivo Quito (1)	Estibadores Navales; Aucas
1975	Macará (1)	Politécnico
1976	Everest (2)	Universidad Técnica de Manabí
1977	Milagro (1)	América de Ambato
1978	L.D. Estudiantil (1)	Politécnico
1979	Macará (2)	Politécnico
1980	Deportivo del Valle (1)	San Camilo
1981	L.D. Estudiantil (2)	Juventud Italiana
1982	Milagro (2)	Politécnico
1983	Filanbanco (1)	Esmeraldas Petrolero
1984	Esmeraldas Petrolero (1)	Everest
1985	Macará (3)	Juventus
1986	Aucas (1)	L.D. Estudiantil
1987	Juventus (1)	Calvi
1988	9 de Octubre (Manta) (1)	Calvi
1989	Juvenil (1)	LDU Loja
1990	Green Cross (1)	ESPOLI
1991	2 de Marzo (1)	Santos
1992	Audaz Octubrino (1)	9 de Octubre
1993	Olmedo (1)	Panamá
1994	Deportivo Quevedo (1)	Flamengo
1995	Imbabura (1)	Santa Rita
1996	Macará (4)	Esmeraldas Petrolero
1997	Deportivo Quinindé (1)	Audaz Octubrino
1998	Universidad Católica (1)	Esmeraldas Petrolero
1999	Deportivo Saquisilí (1)	Santos
2000	UDJ Quinindé (1)	Deportivo Otavalo
2001	Manta (1)	LDU Loja
2002	Deportivo Quevedo (2)	LDU Loja
2003	LDU Loja (1)	LDU Portoviejo
2004	Tungurahua (1)	Esmeraldas Petrolero
2005	Deportivo Azogues (1)	Imbabura
2006	Brasilia (1)	Municipal Cañar
2007	Independiente del Valle (1)	Grecia
2008	Rocafuerte (1)	Atlético Audaz
2009	UTC (1)	River Ecuador
2010	Valle del Chota (1)	Deportivo Quevedo
2011	Ferroviarios (1)	Mushuc Runa
2012	Aucas (2)	Municipal Cañar
2013	Delfín (1)	LDU Portoviejo
2014	Gualaceo (1)	Fuerza Amarilla
2015	Clan Juvenil (1)	Colón
2016	América de Quito (1)	Santa Rita
2017	Puerto Quito (1)	Orense
2018	Alianza Cotopaxi (1)	Duros del Balón
2019	Chacaritas (1)	9 de Octubre
2020	Guayaquil Sport (1)	Cumbayá
2021	Libertad (1)	Imbabura
2022	Cuniburo (1)	Vargas Torres
2023	Leones (1)	San Antonio
2024	22 de Julio (1)	Atlético Vinotinto
2025	LDU Portoviejo	Cuenca Juniors

== Titles by club ==
Club	Titles	Seasons won
Macará	4	1975, 1979, 1985, 1996
Quevedo	2	1994, 2002
Aucas	2	1986, 2012
Everest	2	1967-C, 1976
L.D. Estudiantil	2	1978, 1981
Milagro	2	1977, 1982
2 de Marzo	1	1991
9 de Octubre (Manta)	1	1988
22 de Julio	1	2024
Alianza Cotopaxi	1	2018
América de Quito	1	2016
Audaz Octubrino	1	1992
Brasilia	1	2006
Chacaritas	1	2019
Clan Juvenil	1	2015
Cuniburo	1	2022
Delfín	1	2013
Deportivo Azogues	1	2005
Deportivo del Valle	1	1980
Deportivo Quinindé	1	1997
Deportivo Quito	1	1967-S
Deportivo Saquisilí	1	1999
Esmeraldas Petrolero	1	1984
Ferroviarios	1	2011
Filanbanco	1	1983
Green Cross	1	1990
Gualaceo	1	2014
Guayaquil Sport	1	2020
Imbabura	1	1995
Independiente José Terán	1	2007
Juvenil	1	1989
Juventus	1	1987
LDU Loja	1	2003
Leones	1	2023
Libertad	1	2021
Manta	1	2001
Olmedo	1	1993
Puerto Quito	1	2017
Rocafuerte	1	2008
Tungurahua	1	2004
UDJ Quinindé	1	2000
Universidad Católica	1	1998
UTC	1	2009
Valle del Chota	1	2010
