= Delfín S.C. =

Association football club in Ecuador

Delfín SC
- Full name: Delfín Sporting Club
- Nicknames: El ídolo de Manta (Manta's Idol); El ídolo del Puerto (Idol of the Port); Los auriazules (The golden-blues); El Equipo Cetáceo (The Cetacean Team)
- Founded: 1 March 1989; 37 years ago
- Ground: Estadio Jocay
- Capacity: 21,000
- President: José Delgado
- Manager: Juan Carlos León
- League: Ecuadorian Serie A
- 2025: First stage: 12th of 16; Second hexagonal: 5th of 6
- Website: www.delfinsc.com
Home colours	Away colours	Third colours

Delfín Sporting Club, lit.'dolphin Sporting Club', is an association football club based in Manta, Ecuador. The club was founded on 1 March 1989 after Club Deportivo 9 de Octubre was ceded to a group of directors, which had Club Social Delfín. Later the team renamed Delfín Sporting Club. The club currently plays in the Ecuadorian Serie A, the highest level of Ecuadorian football.

Since 1989, the club has played their home games in Estadio Jocay located in the coastal city of Manta, Ecuador.

== History ==
Delfín SC was founded on 1 March 1989; after founder of Club Deportivo 9 de Octubre Pedro Azua ceded the team to a group of directors from Club Social Delfín. It was Efrén Delgado, Otto Schwarz, and Benincaza whom later joined to create 9 de Octubre-Delfín, which later it renamed Delfín Sporting Club. The club started off on a strong note winning the Serie B championship in 1989 and gaining promotion to the top-flight Serie A in its first season. Surprisingly, the young team was able to stay in Serie A until 1995, when it was relegated back to the Serie B. During their time in the Serie A, the club gained the nickname El ídolo de Manta (Manta's Idol), a nickname previously given to Manta Sport Club, which was Manta's previous team in the top-flight.

In 1998, the club returned to the top-flight, only to return to the Serie B in 1999 and bounce back up in 2000. Their last season in the Serie A was in 2001. In 2007, they were relegated to the third-level Segunda Categoría. Having gained promotion to the Ecuadorian Serie B, they were then promoted to the Ecuadorian Serie A for the 2016 season, in which their Argentine forward Maximiliano Barreiro was the league's top scorer, with 26 goals.

The following 2017 season was the club's historic year, standing strong with only one loss in the first leg of the season and winning La Primera Etapa of the Ecuadorian Serie A. This automatically qualified Delfín a spot for the first time to a Copa Libertadores, which made them the first team from the Manabi province to enter an international tournament. On 17 December, Delfín lost to Emelec 2–0 in the second leg of the final for the Ecuadorian Serie A championship in el Estadio Jocay and therefore ended the season as runner-up.

On 5 April 2018, Delfín achieved its first international win after defeating 2–0 Chilean club Colo-Colo at the 2018 Copa Libertadores. Delfín ended in fourth place at the end of the season, which gave them a straight ticket to their second Copa Libertadores.

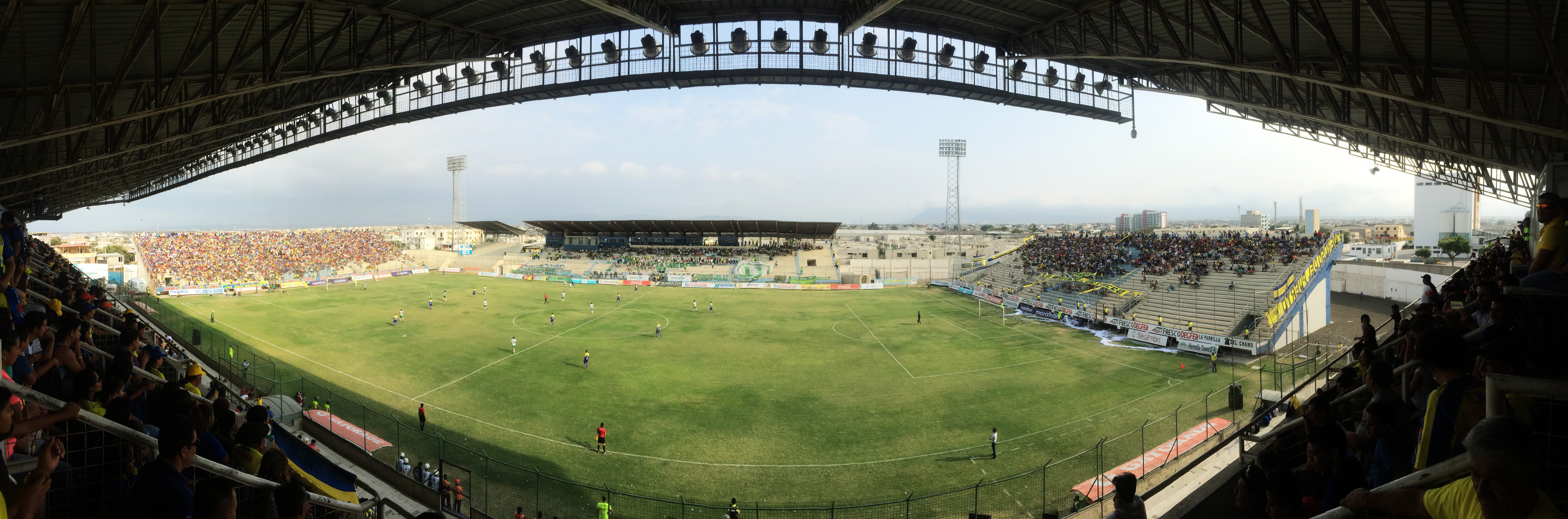
Estadio Jocay in Manta, Ecuador

2019 marked the greatest year for the team as they won their first Serie A title, and the first time a team from their province won any title. The final was played against Liga Deportiva Universitaria de Quito.

== Rivalries ==
The club's biggest rival is LDU Portoviejo with whom they contest the Clásico Manabita.

== Honours ==
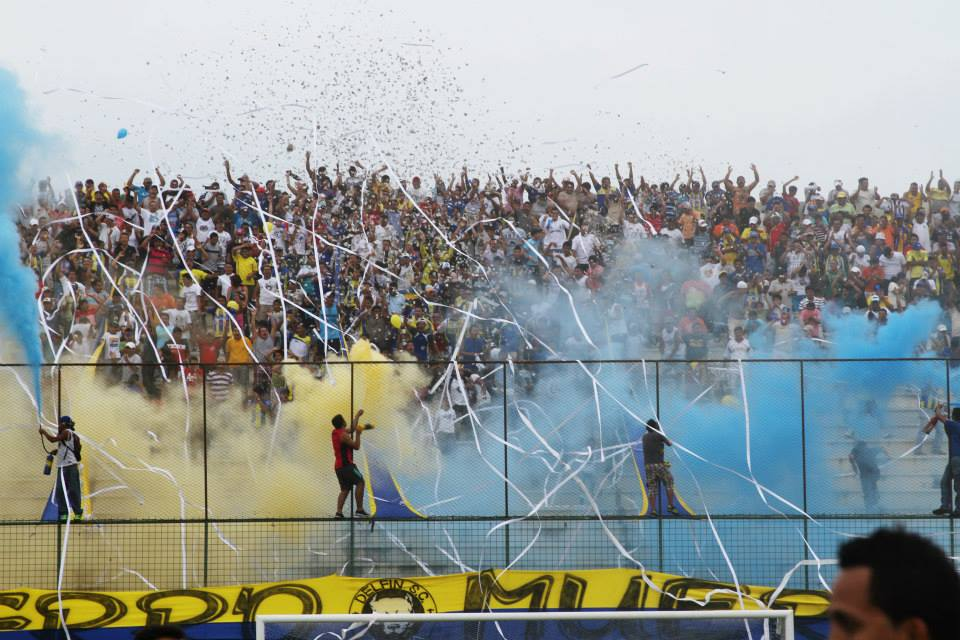
Delfín supporters at el Estadio Jocay.

=== National ===
- Serie A
  - Winners (1): 2019
- Serie B
  - Winners (2): 1989 E1, 2015
- Segunda Categoría
  - Winners (1): 2013

=== Regional ===
- Segunda Categoría de Manabí
  - Winners (2): 2011, 2012

== Players ==
As of 11 April 2026

Note: Flags indicate national team as defined under FIFA eligibility rules; some limited exceptions apply. Players may hold more than one non-FIFA nationality.

No.	Pos.	Nation	Player
1	GK	ECU	Juan José Ortíz
3	DF	ECU	Darío Aimar
5	DF	ECU	Ober Medina
6	DF	ARG	Mateo Burdisso
7	MF	ECU	Anthony Alvarez
8	MF	ARG	Iván Molinas
9	FW	ARG	Franco Ayunta (оn loan from Atlético Temperley)
10	FW	ECU	Erick Mendoza
11	MF	ARG	Franco Perinciolo
13	GK	ECU	Benjamín Cárdenas
14	FW	ECU	Erick Zuniga
16	MF	ECU	Luis Castro
17	DF	ARG	Enzo Rubio (оn loan from Unión Santa Fe)
18	MF	ECU	Jonathan Morocho
19	MF	ARG	Juan Cavallaro

No.	Pos.	Nation	Player
21	GK	ECU	Brian Heras
22	GK	ECU	José Cárdenas
27	FW	ECU	Erik Yepez
29	FW	ARG	Franco Ratotti (оn loan from Unión Santa Fe)
30	MF	ECU	Jefferson Valverde
32	DF	ECU	Anthony Bedoya
33	DF	ECU	Edilson Cabeza
34	DF	ARG	Geronimo Heredia (оn loan from Belgrano)
40	DF	ECU	Luis Castillo
55	MF	ECU	Maikel Reyes
70	FW	ECU	Marcos Mejia
77	DF	ECU	Bryan Hernandez
78	MF	ECU	Kevin Ushiña
99	FW	ECU	Leao Tenorio

== Managers ==
- (Argentina) Enrique Della Vecchia (2002)
- (Montenegro) Dušan Drašković (2005)
- (Ecuador) Geovanny Mera (2006)
- (Argentina) Benicio Aranda (2007)
- (Ecuador) Juan Carlos Bedoya (2011)
- (Ecuador) Nexar Zambrano (2012-2014)
- (Paraguay) Raúl Duarte (2014)
- (Ecuador) Segundo Montaño (2014)
- (Argentina) Fabian Bustos (2015-2016)
- (Argentina) Diego Alarcon (2016)
- (Ecuador) Octavio Zambrano (2016)
- (Argentina) Guillermo Sanguinetti (2017-2018)
- (Argentina) Fabian Bustos (2018-2019)
- (Spain) Ángel López (2020)
- (Argentina) Carlos Ischia (2020)
- (Ecuador) Jefferson Huertas (2020)
- (Argentina) Miguel Ángel Zahzú (2020)
- (Ecuador) Paúl Vélez (2021)
- (Argentina) Horacio Montemurro (2021)
