= C.D. Independiente Juniors =

Ecuadorian football club

Independiente Juniors
- Full name: Club Deportivo Independiente Juniors
- Nickname: El Mini-Negriazul (The Junior black-and-blue)
- Founded: 13 July 2017; 8 years ago
- Ground: Banco Guayaquil; Quito, Ecuador
- Capacity: 12,000
- Chairman: Andrés Larriva
- Manager: Joe Armas
- League: Serie B
- 2024: 4th
- Website: www.independientedelvalle.com
Home colours	Away colours	Third colours

Club Deportivo Independiente Juniors, known as Independiente Juniors or formerly as Alianza Cotopaxi, is a football club based in Sangolquí, Ecuador. The club acts as Independiente del Valle's reserve team.

== History ==
Founded on 13 July 2017 as Alianza Cotopaxi SC in Cotopaxi, the club reached the Segunda Categoría after finishing second in the regional championships. In the following year, the club reached an agreement with Independiente del Valle to become their reserve team, and reached promotion to the Ecuadorian Serie B at the end of the year, after having the core of the 2018 U-20 Copa Libertadores.

Old logo used in 2017.

After the promotion to the second division of Ecuadorian football, the club changed name to Club Deportivo Independiente Juniors, and moved to Latacunga. In 2020, the club moved to Sangolquí, joining the first team which was already in the city.

=== List of managers ===
- (Ecuador) Franklin Anangonó (2017)
- (Ecuador) Juan Carlos León (2018–2019)
- (Ecuador) Yuri Solano (2020)
- (Spain) Felipe Sánchez (2021)
- (Ecuador) Miguel Bravo (2022)
- (Ecuador) Galo Rodríguez (2023)
- (Spain) Javier Rabanal (2024–)

== Current squad ==
As of 5 March 2025

Note: Flags indicate national team as defined under FIFA eligibility rules; some limited exceptions apply. Players may hold more than one non-FIFA nationality.

No.	Pos.	Nation	Player
1	GK	ECU	Elkin Quiñonez
2	DF	ECU	Jorge Arcos
3	DF	ESP	Christian García
4	DF	ECU	Steven Cortez
5	MF	ECU	Youri Ochoa
6	MF	ECU	Milton Cagua (captain)
7	FW	ECU	Ángel Lugo
8	MF	ECU	Pablo Vela
9	FW	ECU	Michael Ayoví
10	MF	ECU	Jamilton Carcelén
12	GK	ECU	David Corozo
13	DF	ECU	Josue Palacios
15	DF	ECU	Jarren Solís
16	MF	ECU	Luis Quiñónez
17	FW	ECU	Mario Solís

No.	Pos.	Nation	Player
18	MF	ECU	Paúl Perlaza
20	DF	ECU	Jeffrey Caiza
21	DF	ECU	Juan Ibarra
30	MF	ECU	Bryan García
32	GK	COL	Johan Portilla
33	DF	ECU	Logar Ordóñez
50	DF	ECU	Dary García
51	MF	ECU	Hans Peralta
53	FW	ECU	Leo Izquiedo
55	FW	ECU	Maelo Rentería
58	FW	ECU	Erick Cabal
84	DF	COL	Óscar Vivas
93	MF	ECU	Washington Yoong
99	FW	ECU	José Klinger

=== Out on loan ===
Note: Flags indicate national team as defined under FIFA eligibility rules; some limited exceptions apply. Players may hold more than one non-FIFA nationality.

No.	Pos.	Nation	Player
—	MF	ECU	Gipson Preciado (at Cancún)
