= Imbabura Sporting Club =

Ecuadorian football club

Imbabura
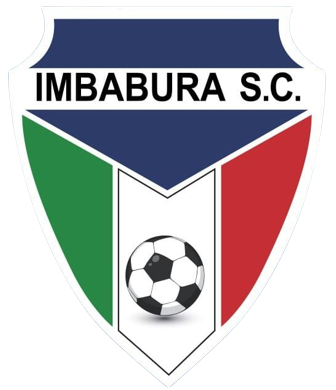
- Full name: Imbabura Sporting Club
- Nicknames: Equipo Gardenio (The garden team in honor of one of the chair-members whose name is Gardenia ) Equipo textilero (Textile team); Equipo de los lagos (The team of the lakes); Los textileros (The textilers)
- Founded: January 3, 1993; 32 years ago
- Ground: Estadio Olímpico
- Capacity: 18,600
- Chairman: Luis Aguirre Narvaez
- Manager: Martín Wainer
- League: Ecuadorian Serie A
- 2023: Ecuadorian Serie B, 2nd of 10 (promoted)
Home colours	Away colours

Imbabura Sporting Club is a professional football club based in Ibarra, Ecuador currently plays at Ecuadorian Serie A The Top division of Ecuadorian League System.

== Achievements ==
- Serie B:
  - Winners (1): 2006 E2
  - Runners-up (1): 2023
- Segunda Categoría:
  - Winners (1): 1995
  - Runners-up (2): 2005, 2021

== Current squad ==
Note: Flags indicate national team as defined under FIFA eligibility rules; some limited exceptions apply. Players may hold more than one non-FIFA nationality.

No.	Pos.	Nation	Player
1	GK	ECU	Mario Valero
2	DF	PAR	Guillermo Coronel
3	DF	ECU	Edilson Cabeza
4	MF	ECU	Alexander Medina
5	MF	ECU	Gilmar Cevallos
6	MF	PAR	Jonathan Benitez
7	MF	ECU	Leandro Pantoja
8	MF	ECU	Rony Caicedo
9	FW	ARG	Federico Paz
10	FW	ECU	Tono Espinoza
11	MF	ECU	Danny Burbano
13	MF	ECU	Micheal Chala
14	DF	ARG	Tomás Lecanda (on loan from CA Tigre)
15	DF	ECU	Roni Chavez
18	DF	ARG	Tomás López

No.	Pos.	Nation	Player
19	MF	ECU	Elian Pepinos
21	DF	ARG	Fernando Prado (on loan from Racing Club)
22	MF	ECU	Erick Mendoza
23	FW	ARG	Luca Klimowicz (on loan from Instituto Córdoba)
24	MF	ARG	Sebastian Sanchez (on loan from Tigre)
25	MF	ECU	Julián Yar
29	FW	ECU	Jacson Pita
31	MF	ECU	Jerson Guisamano
33	GK	ECU	Edisson Recalde
34	MF	ECU	Juan Alcivar
80	MF	ECU	Edu Pineda
90	GK	ECU	Patrik Minda
99	MF	ECU	Cristian Tobar

=== World Cup players ===
The following players were chosen to represent their country at the FIFA World Cup while contracted to Imbabura.

- (Ecuador) Kevin José Rodríguez (2022)
