= Cumbayá F.C. =

Ecuadorian football club

Cumbayá
- Full name: Cumbayá Fútbol Club
- Nickname(s): Los Leones (The Lions); Los parroquianos El equipo parroquiano
- Founded: 31 May 1970; 54 years ago
- Ground: Olímpico Atahualpa
- Capacity: 38,258
- Chairman: Diana Morales
- Manager: Daniel Neculmán
- League: Ecuadorian Serie A
- 2023: Serie A, 14th of 16
Home colours	Away colours	Third colours

Cumbayá Fútbol Club is an Ecuadorian professional football club from the city of Cumbayá. Founded on 31 May 1970, as Club Deportivo Los Loros, they play in the Serie B Ecuadorian 2025.

== History ==
Founded on 31 May 1970 as Club Deportivo Los Loros in Quito, the club started to play in the Segunda Categoría de Pichincha in 2013. They reached the Segunda Categoría in 2015, but were knocked out in the first stage.

In 2017, after a change of administration, the club was moved to the city of Cumbayá and renamed Cumbayá Fútbol Club. In the following three seasons, the club competed in the Segunda Categoría before reaching the finals in 2020, where they achieved promotion to the Serie B but lost to Guayaquil Sport.

In their first-ever season in the second division, Cumbayá achieved promotion to the Serie A on 23 September 2021, being subsequently declared champions with three rounds to go. On 12 October, manager Raúl Duarte announced his departure from the club.

The Pichincha club will make its debut in Serie A in 2022 for the first time in its history. Its first rival will be Independiente del Valle, at home. On the second date of the LigaPro, Cumbayá obtained its first victory in the first division of Ecuadorian soccer after beating the newly promoted Gualaceo as a visitor by 1 to 0 and on the fifth date of the LigaPro, Cumbayá obtained its first home victory in the first division of Ecuadorian soccer after beating Técnico Universitario at home by 2 to 0 at the Atahualpa Olympic Stadium.

== Achievements ==
- Serie B
  - Winners (1): 2021
- Segunda Categoría
  - Runners-up (1): 2020

== Players ==
=== Current squad ===
Note: Flags indicate national team as defined under FIFA eligibility rules; some limited exceptions apply. Players may hold more than one non-FIFA nationality.

No.	Pos.	Nation	Player
1	GK	(Ecuador) ECU	Alexi Lemos
2	MF	(Ecuador) ECU	Fernando Delgado
3	DF	(Ecuador) ECU	Kevin Hurtado
4	DF	(Ecuador) ECU	Juan Carlos Paredes
5	MF	(Argentina) ARG	Alejandro Altuna
7	MF	(Ecuador) ECU	Jefferson Padilla
8	MF	(Ecuador) ECU	Maikel Valencia
9	FW	(Argentina) ARG	Augusto Magoia
10	MF	(Ecuador) ECU	Rommel Tapia
12	DF	(Ecuador) ECU	Washington Plúas
14	DF	(Ecuador) ECU	Darwin Suárez
15	MF	(Argentina) ARG	Lucas Ontivero
16	DF	(Ecuador) ECU	Luis Gustavino
18	MF	(Ecuador) ECU	Ariel Almagro
19	MF	(Ecuador) ECU	Melvin Díaz
20	MF	(Ecuador) ECU	Milton Gruezo

No.	Pos.	Nation	Player
22	MF	(Ecuador) ECU	Thiago Serpa
23	GK	(Argentina) ARG	Felipe San Juan
25	MF	(Ecuador) ECU	David Caicedo
27	FW	(Ecuador) ECU	Jaime Ortíz
28	DF	(Argentina) ARG	Franco Suárez
29	MF	(Ecuador) ECU	Kevin Rivera
30	FW	(Ecuador) ECU	Jefferson Vernaza
32	FW	(Argentina) ARG	Bruno Vides
33	GK	(Ecuador) ECU	Benjamín Cárdenas
37	DF	(Ecuador) ECU	Gorman Estacio
54	FW	(Ecuador) ECU	Bruno Caicedo (on loan from Barcelona SC)
60	MF	(Ecuador) ECU	David Ortiz
66	MF	(Ecuador) ECU	David Angulo
—	DF	(Argentina) ARG	Rodrigo Morínigo
