= 2023 LigaPro Serie A =

LigaPro Serie A
- Season: 2023
- Dates: 24 February – 17 December 2023
- Champions: LDU Quito (12th title)
- Relegated: Gualaceo; Guayaquil City
- Copa Libertadores: LDU Quito (via Copa Sudamericana); Independiente del Valle; Barcelona; El Nacional; Aucas
- Copa Sudamericana: Delfín; Universidad Católica; Técnico Universitario; Deportivo Cuenca
- Matches: 244
- Goals: 597 (2.45 per match)
- Top goalscorer: Miguel Parrales (16 goals)
- Biggest home win: Barcelona 5–0 Delfín (4 March); LDU Quito 6–1 Gualaceo (31 March)
- Biggest away win: U. Católica 0–4 LDU Quito (29 April)
- Highest scoring: LDU Quito 6–1 Gualaceo (31 March); Gualaceo 3–4 El Nacional (4 June); Ind. del Valle 3–4 El Nacional (16 June)

The 2023 Campeonato Ecuatoriano de Fútbol Serie A, known as the LigaPro BET593 2023 for sponsoring purposes, was the 65th season of the Serie A, Ecuador's top tier football league, and the fifth under the management of the Liga Profesional de Fútbol del Ecuador (or LigaPro). The season began on 24 February and ended on 17 December 2023, with the fixture for the season being unveiled on 24 January 2023.

LDU Quito were the champions, winning their twelfth domestic league title after beating Independiente del Valle on penalty kicks in the finals after a 1–1 draw on aggregate. Aucas were the defending champions.

== Teams ==
16 teams competed in the season. Macará and 9 de Octubre were relegated after finishing in the bottom two places of the aggregate table of the previous season, being replaced by the 2022 Serie B champions El Nacional and third place Libertad. El Nacional clinched promotion to the top flight with two matches to go after defeating Libertad 4–2 on 20 October 2022, whilst Libertad themselves ensured promotion in the last round played on 30 October 2022, with a 2–0 victory over Imbabura and a 1–1 draw for América de Quito against Independiente Juniors. Despite having finished in third place in Serie B, Libertad were promoted to the top flight since runners-up Independiente Juniors are Independiente del Valle's reserve team. El Nacional returned to Serie A after two seasons, and Libertad will compete in Serie A for the first time ever.

=== Stadia and locations ===
Locations of the 2023 Serie A clubs.

Team	City	Stadium	Capacity
Aucas	Quito	Cooprogreso Gonzalo Pozo Ripalda	21,689
Barcelona	Guayaquil	Monumental Banco Pichincha	57,267
Cumbayá	Quito	Olímpico Atahualpa	35,258
Delfín	Manta	Jocay	17,834
Deportivo Cuenca	Cuenca	Banco del Austro Alejandro Serrano Aguilar	18,549
El Nacional	Quito	Olímpico Atahualpa	35,258
Emelec	Guayaquil	George Capwell	40,020
Gualaceo	Azogues	Jorge Andrade Cantos	14,000
Guayaquil City	Guayaquil	Christian Benítez Betancourt	10,152
Independiente del Valle	Quito	Banco Guayaquil	12,000
LDU Quito	Quito	Rodrigo Paz Delgado	41,575
Libertad	Loja	Reina del Cisne	14,935
Mushuc Runa	Ambato	COAC Mushuc Runa	8,200
Orense	Machala	9 de Mayo	16,456
Técnico Universitario	Ambato	Bellavista Universidad Indoamérica	16,467
Universidad Católica	Quito	Olímpico Atahualpa	35,258

=== Personnel and kits ===
Team	Manager	Kit manufacturer	Shirt sponsor
Aucas	(Colombia) Santiago Escobar	Umbro	BET593
Barcelona	(Uruguay) Diego López	Marathon	Pilsener
Cumbayá	(Ecuador) Leonardo Vanegas	Lotto	
Delfín	(Argentina) Guillermo Duró	Baldo's	La Esquina de Ales
Deportivo Cuenca	(Argentina) Carlos Ischia	Lotto	Ecuabet, Banco del Austro, Chubb Seguros
El Nacional	(Paraguay) Ever Almeida	Lotto	ANDEC, Banco General Rumiñahui, Gana Play
Emelec	(Colombia) Hernán Torres	Adidas	Novibet
Gualaceo	(Argentina) Fabián Frías	Boman	Banco del Austro, Okibet
Guayaquil City	(Ecuador) Pool Gavilánez	Astro	BET593, TC Televisión
Independiente del Valle	(Argentina) Martín Anselmi	Marathon	Ecuabet, Banco Guayaquil, Toyota
LDU Quito	(Argentina) Luis Zubeldía	Puma	Banco Pichincha
Libertad	(Ecuador) Geovanny Cumbicus	Jasa	Banco de Loja, Grand Aviation
Mushuc Runa	(Ecuador) Renato Salas	Boman	Cooperativa Mushuc Runa
Orense	(Ecuador) Juan Carlos León	Elohim	Banco de Machala, IncarPalm
Técnico Universitario	(Colombia) Juan Pablo Buch	Kappa	Cooperativa San Francisco Ltda.
Universidad Católica	(Spain) Igor Oca	Umbro	Banco Pichincha, Fundación Crisfe

=== Managerial changes ===
Team	Outgoing manager	Manner of departure	Date of vacancy	Position in table	Incoming manager	Date of appointment
First stage
Universidad Católica	(Argentina) Miguel Rondelli	End of contract	17 November 2022	Pre-season	(Spain) Igor Oca	28 November 2022
Deportivo Cuenca	(Argentina) Gabriel Schürrer	Resigned	21 November 2022	Pre-season	(Argentina) Gabriel del Valle and (Argentina) Juan Zubeldía	12 December 2022
Emelec	(Spain) Ismael Rescalvo	Mutual agreement	25 November 2022	Pre-season	(Argentina) Miguel Rondelli	29 November 2022
Deportivo Cuenca	(Argentina) Gabriel del Valle and (Argentina) Juan Zubeldía	Mutual agreement	3 May 2023	10th	(Ecuador) Jerson Stacio (Note: Caretaker manager.)	3 May 2023
Deportivo Cuenca	(Ecuador) Jerson Stacio	End of caretaker spell	12 May 2023	9th	(Argentina) Carlos Ischia	12 May 2023
Libertad	(Ecuador) Paúl Vélez	Sacked	24 May 2023	15th	(Argentina) Marcelo Robledo	24 May 2023
Mushuc Runa	(Ecuador) Geovanny Cumbicus	Sacked	29 May 2023	16th	(Ecuador) Renato Salas (Note: Originally as caretaker manager, appointed on a permanent basis on 21 June 2023.)	29 May 2023
Barcelona	(Argentina) Fabián Bustos	Resigned	4 June 2023	3rd	(Ecuador) Segundo Castillo	4 June 2023
Emelec	(Argentina) Miguel Rondelli	Mutual agreement	7 June 2023	12th	(Colombia) Hernán Torres	8 June 2023
Aucas	(Venezuela) César Farías	Sacked	15 June 2023	8th	(Argentina) Nelson Videla	15 June 2023
Second stage
Aucas	(Argentina) Nelson Videla	End of caretaker spell	23 June 2023	Pre-tournament	(Colombia) Santiago Escobar	23 June 2023
Barcelona	(Ecuador) Segundo Castillo	End of caretaker spell	12 July 2023	Pre-tournament	(Uruguay) Diego López	12 July 2023
Libertad	(Argentina) Marcelo Robledo	Resigned	18 August 2023	15th	(Ecuador) Geovanny Cumbicus	18 August 2023
Gualaceo	(Ecuador) Leonardo Vanegas	Resigned	18 September 2023	16th	(Ecuador) Diego Idrovo	19 September 2023
Gualaceo	(Ecuador) Diego Idrovo	End of caretaker spell	23 September 2023	16th	(Argentina) Fabián Frías	23 September 2023
Cumbayá	(Ecuador) Patricio Hurtado	Mutual agreement	8 November 2023	14th	(Ecuador) Leonardo Vanegas	8 November 2023

== First stage ==
The first stage began on 24 February and ended on 23 June 2023.

=== Standings ===
Pos	Team	Pld	W	D	L	GF	GA	GD	Pts	Qualification
1	Independiente del Valle	15	11	1	3	31	15	+16	34	Advance to Finals and qualification for Copa Libertadores group stage
2	El Nacional	15	10	0	5	32	25	+7	30	
3	LDU Quito	15	7	5	3	29	17	+12	26	
4	Barcelona	15	8	2	5	30	20	+10	26	
5	Aucas	15	7	3	5	17	19	−2	24	
6	Universidad Católica	15	7	3	5	22	25	−3	24	
7	Delfín	15	7	3	5	18	23	−5	24	
8	Deportivo Cuenca	15	7	0	8	24	21	+3	21	
9	Orense	15	6	3	6	17	21	−4	21	
10	Técnico Universitario	15	5	3	7	21	15	+6	18	
11	Gualaceo	15	5	3	7	17	23	−6	18	
12	Cumbayá	15	4	5	6	10	13	−3	17	
13	Emelec	15	3	5	7	18	20	−2	14	
14	Libertad	15	2	7	6	20	26	−6	13	
15	Mushuc Runa	15	3	4	8	14	25	−11	13	
16	Guayaquil City	15	3	3	9	17	29	−12	12	

Source: LigaPro, Soccerway
Rules for classification: 1) Points, 2) Goal difference, 3) Goals for, 4) Away goals for, 5) Head-to-head record, 6) Drawing of lots.

=== Results ===
Home \ Away	AUC	BSC	CUM	DEL	CUE	NAC	EME	GUA	GCY	IDV	LDQ	LIB	MUS	ORE	TEC	CAT
Aucas	—	—	2–1	—	0–2	0–2	2–1	1–0	1–0	—	—	—	—	2–0	—	4–1
Barcelona	5–1	—	4–1	5–0	2–1	—	1–3	—	—	—	—	—	1–0	2–0	—	1–2
Cumbayá	—	—	—	0–1	—	2–0	0–0	1–0	—	1–0	—	2–1	1–1	—	—	0–1
Delfín	2–0	—	—	—	—	2–0	3–2	1–0	—	—	—	3–2	3–0	1–1	—	0–0
Deportivo Cuenca	—	—	1–0	4–0	—	—	3–2	1–2	4–1	1–2	2–0	—	3–0	—	—	—
El Nacional	—	4–1	—	—	3–1	—	—	—	—	—	0–2	4–2	—	3–1	3–2	1–2
Emelec	—	—	—	—	—	1–2	—	0–0	0–0	2–3	1–1	2–0	—	—	1–0	—
Gualaceo	—	2–1	—	—	—	3–4	—	—	2–1	1–2	—	1–1	—	2–1	1–1	1–0
Guayaquil City	—	1–2	1–1	2–1	—	3–1	—	—	—	—	1–2	1–1	4–1	—	—	—
Independiente del Valle	2–0	1–0	—	3–0	—	3–4	—	—	4–0	—	2–3	—	3–1	—	1–0	—
LDU Quito	1–1	0–1	0–0	1–1	—	—	—	6–1	—	—	—	4–2	—	—	2–1	—
Libertad	2–2	2–2	—	—	3–1	—	—	—	—	0–0	—	—	—	0–0	1–0	2–2
Mushuc Runa	0–0	—	—	—	—	0–1	0–0	2–1	—	—	2–2	2–1	—	3–1	—	—
Orense	—	—	1–0	—	2–0	—	2–1	—	3–2	0–2	2–1	—	—	—	2–1	—
Técnico Universitario	0–1	2–2	0–0	3–0	3–0	—	—	—	3–0	—	—	—	1–0	—	—	4–1
Universidad Católica	—	—	—	—	1–0	—	3–2	—	3–0	2–3	0–4	—	3–2	1–1	—	—

Source: LigaPro, Soccerway
Legend: Blue = home team win; Yellow = draw; Red = away team win.

=== Attendances ===
#	Club	Average attendance
1	Emelec	11,945
2	Barcelona	7,273
3	LDU Quito	7,131
4	Libertad	5,342
5	Técnico Universitario	4,370
6	El Nacional	4,252
7	Orense SC	3,200
8	SD Aucas	2,814
9	Deportivo Cuenca	2,670
10	Independiente del Valle	2,586
11	Universidad Católica del Ecuador	1,221
12	Gualaceo SC	933
13	Mushuc Runa	637
14	Cumbayá FC	542
15	Delfín SC	528
16	Guayaquil City	432

Source: World Football

== Second stage ==
The second stage began on 4 August and ended on 3 December 2023.

=== Standings ===
Pos	Team	Pld	W	D	L	GF	GA	GD	Pts	Qualification
1	LDU Quito	15	11	3	1	21	4	+17	36	Advance to Finals and qualification for Copa Libertadores group stage
2	Barcelona	15	9	5	1	24	15	+9	32	
3	Aucas	15	6	7	2	22	15	+7	25	
4	Delfín	15	5	9	1	19	12	+7	24	
5	El Nacional	15	5	8	2	25	19	+6	23	
6	Emelec	15	5	7	3	14	8	+6	22	
7	Universidad Católica	15	5	7	3	15	12	+3	22	
8	Independiente del Valle	15	6	3	6	18	15	+3	21	
9	Técnico Universitario	15	4	7	4	20	17	+3	19	
10	Mushuc Runa	15	5	4	6	14	19	−5	19	
11	Orense	15	4	4	7	15	15	0	16	
12	Deportivo Cuenca	15	3	7	5	12	16	−4	16	
13	Libertad	15	4	3	8	12	18	−6	15	
14	Guayaquil City	15	2	4	9	5	18	−13	10	
15	Cumbayá	15	1	6	8	14	26	−12	9	
16	Gualaceo	15	1	4	10	9	30	−21	7	

Source: LigaPro, Soccerway
Rules for classification: 1) Points, 2) Goal difference, 3) Goals for, 4) Away goals for, 5) Head-to-head record, 6) Drawing of lots.

=== Results ===
Home \ Away	AUC	BSC	CUM	DEL	CUE	NAC	EME	GUA	GCY	IDV	LDQ	LIB	MUS	ORE	TEC	CAT
Aucas	—	3–2	—	0–0	—	—	—	—	—	2–0	0–0	1–2	4–0	—	2–4	—
Barcelona	—	—	—	—	—	3–2	—	2–0	2–1	1–1	1–0	1–0	—	—	1–0	—
Cumbayá	1–1	2–2	—	—	1–1	—	—	—	2–2	—	1–2	—	—	0–1	0–1	—
Delfín	—	1–1	4–0	—	0–0	—	—	—	1–0	1–0	0–0	—	—	—	2–2	—
Deportivo Cuenca	0–0	1–2	—	—	—	1–0	—	—	—	—	—	2–1	—	1–0	1–1	2–3
El Nacional	2–2	—	2–2	2–2	—	—	1–1	4–2	2–0	2–1	—	—	2–0	—	—	—
Emelec	0–0	0–0	3–0	0–1	2–1	—	—	—	—	—	—	—	3–1	0–0	—	2–1
Gualaceo	1–2	—	0–3	2–2	1–1	—	0–2	—	—	—	1–3	—	0–0	—	—	—
Guayaquil City	0–1	—	—	—	0–0	—	0–0	0–2	—	0–2	—	—	—	1–0	1–0	0–0
Independiente del Valle	—	—	2–0	—	2–0	—	2–1	2–0	—	—	—	2–0	—	2–2	—	0–1
LDU Quito	—	—	—	—	2–0	0–0	1–0	—	2–0	2–0	—	—	3–1	1–0	—	1–0
Libertad	—	—	3–1	1–3	—	0–1	0–0	3–0	1–0	—	0–2	—	0–1	—	—	—
Mushuc Runa	—	2–2	1–1	2–0	1–1	—	—	—	3–0	1–0	—	—	—	—	1–0	0–2
Orense	1–2	2–3	—	0–0	—	1–1	—	2–0	—	—	—	3–0	1–0	—	—	1–2
Técnico Universitario	—	—	—	—	—	3–3	0–0	4–0	—	2–2	0–2	1–1	—	2–1	—	—
Universidad Católica	2–2	0–1	1–0	2–2	—	1–1	—	0–0	—	—	—	0–0	—	—	0–0	—

Source: LigaPro, Soccerway
Legend: Blue = home team win; Yellow = draw; Red = away team win.

== Finals ==
The finals (Third stage) were played by Independiente del Valle (first stage winners) and LDU Quito (second stage winners). The winners of this double-legged series were crowned as Serie A champions. By having the greater number of points in the aggregate table, LDU Quito played the second leg at home.

10 December 2023
16:30 UTC−5

Independiente del Valle	0–0	LDU Quito
	Report

Estadio Banco Guayaquil, Quito
Referee: Guillermo Guerrero

17 December 2023
16:30 UTC−5

LDU Quito	1–1	Independiente del Valle
Ibarra 19'	Report	Páez 16'
Penalties
Alzugaray (penalty scored); Hurtado (penalty scored); Quiñónez (penalty scored)	3–0	(penalty missed) Faravelli; (penalty missed) Alcívar; (penalty missed) Moreno

Estadio Rodrigo Paz Delgado, Quito
Referee: Augusto Aragón

Tied 1–1 on aggregate, LDU Quito won on penalties.

== Aggregate table ==
Pos	Team	Pld	W	D	L	GF	GA	GD	Pts	Qualification or relegation
1	LDU Quito (C)	30	18	8	4	50	21	+29	62	Qualification for Copa Libertadores group stage (Note: LDU Quito qualified for the Copa Libertadores group stage by winning the 2023 Copa Sudamericana.)
2	Barcelona	30	17	7	6	54	35	+19	58	Qualification for Copa Libertadores group stage
3	Independiente del Valle	30	17	4	9	49	30	+19	55	Qualification for Copa Libertadores group stage
4	El Nacional	30	15	8	7	57	44	+13	53	Qualification for Copa Libertadores second stage
5	Aucas	30	13	10	7	39	34	+5	49	Qualification for Copa Libertadores first stage
6	Delfín	30	12	12	6	37	35	+2	48	Qualification for Copa Sudamericana first stage
7	Universidad Católica	30	12	10	8	37	37	0	46	Qualification for Copa Sudamericana first stage
8	Técnico Universitario	30	9	10	11	41	32	+9	37	Qualification for Copa Sudamericana first stage
9	Deportivo Cuenca	30	10	7	13	36	37	−1	37	Qualification for Copa Sudamericana first stage
10	Orense	30	10	7	13	32	36	−4	37	
11	Emelec	30	8	12	10	32	28	+4	36	
12	Mushuc Runa	30	8	8	14	28	44	−16	32	
13	Libertad	30	6	10	14	32	44	−12	28	
14	Cumbayá	30	5	11	14	24	39	−15	26	
15	Gualaceo (R)	30	6	7	17	26	53	−27	25	Relegation to Ecuadorian Serie B
16	Guayaquil City (R)	30	5	7	18	22	47	−25	22	Relegation to Ecuadorian Serie B

Source: LigaPro
Rules for classification: 1) Points, 2) Goal difference, 3) Goals for, 4) Away goals for, 5) Head-to-head record, 6) Drawing of lots.
(C) Champions; (R) Relegated

== Top scorers ==
Rank	Name	Club	Goals
1	(Ecuador) Miguel Parrales	Guayaquil City	16
2	(Colombia) Jean Carlos Blanco	Técnico Universitario	13
3	(Argentina) Francisco Fydriszewski	Barcelona	12
3	(Argentina) Michael Hoyos	Independiente del Valle	12
5	(Ecuador) Jhon Cifuente	Aucas	11
5	(Uruguay) Joaquín Vergés	Gualaceo	11
7	(Ecuador) Alexander Alvarado	LDU Quito	10
7	(Argentina) Raúl Becerra	Deportivo Cuenca	10
7	(Ecuador) Damián Díaz	Barcelona	10
10	(Ecuador) Ronie Carrillo	El Nacional	9

Source: Ecuagol
