= 2023 Barcelona Sporting Club season =

Ecuadorian football club season

Barcelona SC
2023 season
- President: Carlos Alfaro Moreno
- Head Coach: Fabián Bustos
- Stadium: Monumental Banco Pichincha
- Liga Pro First Stage: 2nd place
- Liga Pro Second Stage: TBD
- Copa Ecuador: Round of 32
- Copa Libertadores: Group stage
- Top goalscorer: League: Francisco Fydriszewski (12); All: Francisco Fydriszewski (14)

The 2023 season is the 98th season in the existence of Barcelona Sporting Club, and the 65th season in the top flight of Ecuadorian football. Barcelona is involved in three competitions: the main national tournament Liga Pro, the national cup called Copa Ecuador, and the international tournament Copa Libertadores.

This season is the fourth one with Carlos Alfaro Moreno as president of the club. Barcelona's coach is Fabian Bustos who returns after departing the club for Santos FC during the previous season.

== Competitions ==
=== Overall record ===
Competition	First match	Last match	Starting round	Record							
Competition	First match	Last match	Starting round	Pld	W	D	L	GF	GA	GD	Win %
Serie A 1st Phase	26 February 2023	18 June 2023	Matchday 1	6	4	0	2	12	4	+8	66.67
Serie A 2nd Phase	6 August 2023	3 December 2023	Matchday 1	0	0	0	0	0	0	+0	—
Copa Ecuador	TBD	TBD	Round of 32	0	0	0	0	0	0	+0	—
Copa Libertadores	5 April 2023	TBD	Group stage	1	0	0	1	1	2	−1	0.00
Total				7	4	0	3	13	6	+7	57.14

Last updated: 19 April 2023
Source: Soccerway

=== LigaPro Serie A ===
==== First stage ====
===== Stage Table =====
Pos	Team	Pld	W	D	L	GF	GA	GD	Pts	Qualification
1	Independiente del Valle	6	4	1	1	10	4	+6	13	Advance to Finals and qualification for Copa Libertadores group stage
2	Barcelona	6	4	0	2	12	4	+8	12	
3	Aucas	6	3	2	1	10	7	+3	11	
4	Orense	6	3	2	1	10	7	+3	11	
5	LDU Quito	6	3	1	2	11	6	+5	10	

Updated to match(es) played on 5 April 2023. Source: LigaPro, Soccerway
Rules for classification: 1) Points, 2) Goal difference, 3) Goals for, 4) Away goals for, 5) Head-to-head record, 6) Drawing of lots.

===== Results summary =====
Overall								Home						Away					
Pld	W	D	L	GF	GA	GD	Pts	W	D	L	GF	GA	GD	W	D	L	GF	GA	GD
6	4	0	2	12	4	+8	12	3	0	0	10	1	+9	1	0	2	2	3	−1

===== Results by round =====
Round	1	2	3	4	5	6	7	8	9	10	11	12	13	14	15
Ground	A	H	A	H	H	A	H	A	H	A	H	A	H	A	H
Result	L	W	L	W	W	W									

Updated to match(es) played on 19 April 2023. Source: ESPN
A = Away; H = Home; W = Win; D = Draw; L = Loss

===== Matches =====
February 26 Round 1	Gualaceo	2-1	Barcelona	Gualaceo
TBA UTC−05:00				Stadium: Gerardo León Pozo

March 5 Round 2	Barcelona	5-0	Delfín	Guayaquil
TBA UTC−05:00				Stadium: Estadio Monumental

Postponed Round 3 (Note: Liga Pro postponed all round three fixtures on 10 March 2023 as part of a television rights dispute.)	Independiente del Valle	v	Barcelona	Sangolquí
TBA UTC−05:00				Stadium: Estadio Banco Guayaquil

March 18 Round 3 (Note: Due to Liga Pro postponing all round three fixtures, all remaining fixtures were played one gameweek later than originally scheduled with the season's first phase ending one week late as a result.)	Independiente del Valle	1-0	Barcelona	Sangolquí
19:00 UTC−05:00	Díaz 42'	Report		Stadium: Estadio Banco Guayaquil; Referee: Augusto Aragón

April 1 Round 4	Barcelona	1-0	Mushuc Runa	Guayaquil
16:30 UTC−05:00	Cortez 68'	Report		Stadium: Estadio Monumental; Referee: René Marín

April 10 Round 5	Barcelona	4-1	Cumbayá	Guayaquil
TBA UTC−05:00		Report		Stadium: Estadio Monumental; Referee: Byran Loayza

April 15 Round 6	LDU Quito	0-1	Barcelona	Quito
TBA UTC−05:00		Report	Ortiz 45+2'	Stadium: Estadio Rodrigo Paz Delgado; Referee: René Marín

April 23 Round 7	Barcelona	v	Deportivo Cuenca	Guayaquil
TBA UTC−05:00				Stadium: Estadio Monumental

April 29 Round 8	Técnico Universitario	v	Barcelona	Ambato
TBA UTC−05:00				Stadium: Estadio Bellavista

May 7 Round 9	Barcelona	v	Aucas	Guayaquil
TBA UTC−05:00				Stadium: Estadio Monumental

May 13 Round 10	Libertad	v	Barcelona	Loja
TBA UTC−05:00				Stadium: Estadio Federativo Reina del Cisne

May 19 Round 11	Barcelona	v	Orense	Guayaquil
TBA UTC−05:00				Stadium: Estadio Monumental

May 28 Round 12	El Nacional	v	Barcelona	Quito
TBA UTC−05:00				Stadium: Estadio Olímpico Atahualpa

June 3 Round 13	Barcelona	v	Emelec	Guayaquil
TBA UTC−05:00				Stadium: Estadio Monumental

June 11 Round 14	Guayaquil City	v	Barcelona	Guayaquil
TBA UTC−05:00				Stadium: Estadio Christian Benítez Betancourt

June 18 Round 15	Barcelona	v	Universidad Católica	Guayaquil
TBA UTC−05:00				Stadium: Estadio Monumental

==== Second stage ====
===== Stage Table =====
Pos	Team	Pld	W	D	L	GF	GA	GD	Pts	Qualification
1	Aucas	0	0	0	0	0	0	0	0	Advance to Finals and qualification for Copa Libertadores group stage
2	Barcelona	0	0	0	0	0	0	0	0	
3	Cumbayá	0	0	0	0	0	0	0	0	
4	Delfín	0	0	0	0	0	0	0	0	
5	Deportivo Cuenca	0	0	0	0	0	0	0	0	

First match(es) will be played: 6 August 2023. Source:
Rules for classification: 1) Points, 2) Goal difference, 3) Goals for, 4) Away goals for, 5) Head-to-head record, 6) Drawing of lots.

===== Results summary =====
Overall								Home						Away					
Pld	W	D	L	GF	GA	GD	Pts	W	D	L	GF	GA	GD	W	D	L	GF	GA	GD
0	0	0	0	0	0	0	0	0	0	0	0	0	0	0	0	0	0	0	0

===== Results by round =====
Round	1	2	3	4	5	6	7	8	9	10	11	12	13	14	15
Ground	H	A	H	A	A	H	A	H	A	H	A	H	A	H	A
Result															
Position															

Updated to match(es) played on 28 January 2023. Source: ESPN
A = Away; H = Home; W = Win; D = Draw; L = Loss

===== Matches =====
August 6 Round 1	Barcelona	v	Gualaceo	Guayaquil
TBA UTC−05:00				Stadium: Estadio Monumental

August 13 Round 2	Delfín	v	Barcelona	Manta
TBA UTC−05:00				Stadium: Estadio Jocay

August 20 Round 3	Barcelona	v	Independiente del Valle	Guayaquil
TBA UTC−05:00				Stadium: Estadio Monumental

August 27 Round 4	Mushuc Runa	v	Barcelona	Ambato
TBA UTC−05:00				Stadium: COAC Mushuc Runa

September 3 Round 5	Cumbayá	v	Barcelona	Cumbayá
TBA UTC−05:00				Stadium: Olímpico Atahualpa

September 17 Round 6	Barcelona	v	LDU Quito	Guayaquil
TBA UTC−05:00				Stadium: Estadio Monumental

September 24 Round 7	Deportivo Cuenca	v	Barcelona	Cuenca
TBA UTC−05:00				Stadium: Estadio Alejandro Serrano Aguilar

October 1 Round 8	Barcelona	v	Técnico Universitario	Guayaquil
TBA UTC−05:00				Stadium: Estadio Monumental

October 8 Round 9	Aucas	v	Barcelona	Quito
TBA UTC−05:00				Stadium: Estadio Gonzalo Pozo Ripalda

October 22 Round 10	Barcelona	v	Libertad	Guayaquil
TBA UTC−05:00				Stadium: Estadio Monumental

October 29 Round 11	Orense	v	Barcelona	Machala
TBA UTC−05:00				Stadium: Estadio 9 de Mayo

November 5 Round 12	Barcelona	v	El Nacional	Guayaquil
TBA UTC−05:00				Stadium: Estadio Monumental

November 12 Round 13	Emelec	v	Barcelona	Guayaquil
TBA UTC−05:00				Stadium: Estadio George Capwell

November 26 Round 14	Barcelona	v	Guayaquil City	Guayaquil
TBA UTC−05:00				Stadium: Estadio Monumental

December 3 Round 15	Universidad Católica	v	Barcelona	Quito
TBA UTC−05:00				Stadium: Estadio Olímpico Atahualpa

=== Copa Libertadores ===
==== Group stage ====
The group draw was held March 22nd. Barcelona was selected from pot two and drawn into Group C.

Pos	Team	Pld	W	D	L	GF	GA	GD	Pts	Qualification
1	(Brazil) Palmeiras	6	5	0	1	16	6	+10	15	Round of 16
2	(Bolivia) Bolívar	6	4	0	2	11	7	+4	12	Round of 16
3	(Ecuador) Barcelona	6	1	1	4	7	12	−5	4	Copa Sudamericana
4	(Paraguay) Cerro Porteño	6	1	1	4	5	14	−9	4	

Source: CONMEBOL

===== Matches =====
5 April 2023 Matchday 1	Cerro Porteño (Paraguay)	2-1	Barcelona	Asunción
20:00 UTC−4		Report		Stadium: Estadio General Pablo Rojas; Referee: Darío Herrera (Argentina)

19 April 2023 Matchday 2	Barcelona	v	(Bolivia) Bolívar	Guayaquil
21:00 UTC−5				Stadium: Estadio Monumental Isidro Romero Carbo

3 May 2023 Matchday 3	Barcelona	v	(Brazil) Palmeiras	Guayaquil
19:30 UTC−5				Stadium: Estadio Monumental Isidro Romero Carbo

23 May 2023 Matchday 4	Bolívar (Bolivia)	v	Barcelona	La Paz
20:00 UTC−4				Stadium: Estadio Hernando Siles

7 June 2023 Matchday 5	Palmeiras (Brazil)	v	Barcelona	São Paulo
21:30 UTC−3				Stadium: Allianz Parque

29 June 2023 Matchday 6	Barcelona	v	(Paraguay) Cerro Porteño	Guayaquil
19:00 UTC−5				Stadium: Estadio Monumental Isidro Romero Carbo

== Statistics ==
=== Goalscorers ===
Rank	Player	League	International Cups	Total
1	(Ecuador) Damián Díaz	4	0	4
2	(Argentina) Jonatan Bauman	2	0	2
2	(Argentina) Christian Ortiz	1	1	2
4	(Ecuador) Gabriel Cortez	1	0	1
4	(Ecuador) Fidel Martínez	1	0	1
4	(Ecuador) Janner Corozo	1	0	1
4	(Argentina) Francisco Fydriszewski	1	0	1
4	(Uruguay) Agustín Rodríguez	1	0	1
**	Own Goals	0	0	0
	Team Totals	12	1	13
