= 2022 LigaPro Serie A =

LigaPro Serie A
- Season: 2022
- Dates: 18 February – 13 November 2022
- Champions: Aucas (1st title)
- Relegated: Macará; 9 de Octubre
- Copa Libertadores: Aucas; Barcelona; Universidad Católica; Independiente del Valle (via Copa Sudamericana)
- Copa Sudamericana: LDU Quito; Emelec; Deportivo Cuenca; Delfín
- Matches: 242
- Goals: 587 (2.43 per match)
- Top goalscorer: Francisco Fydriszewski (15 goals)
- Biggest home win: Aucas 5–0 Ind. del Valle (23 July)
- Biggest away win: Macará 0–5 LDU Quito (22 October)
- Highest scoring: LDU Quito 4–4 Aucas (19 March); Barcelona 5–3 Macará (10 September)

The 2022 Campeonato Ecuatoriano de Fútbol Serie A, known as the LigaPro Betcris 2022 for sponsoring purposes, was the 64th season of the Serie A, Ecuador's top tier football league, and the fourth under the management of the Liga Profesional de Fútbol del Ecuador (or LigaPro). The season began on 18 February and ended on 13 November 2022.

Aucas won their first Serie A title in this season, defeating Barcelona in the finals by a 1–0 aggregate score. Independiente del Valle were the defending champions.

== Teams ==
16 teams competed in the season. Manta and Olmedo were relegated after finishing in the bottom two places of the aggregate table of the previous season, being replaced by the 2021 Serie B champions Cumbayá and runners-up Gualaceo. Cumbayá clinched promotion to the top flight with three matches in hand after a 2–1 win over Independiente Juniors on 23 September 2021, whilst Gualaceo ensured promotion on 13 October 2021, with a 2–1 victory against Atlético Santo Domingo and a draw for El Nacional against Independiente Juniors. Both promoted teams took part in Serie A for the first time ever.

=== Stadia and locations ===
Locations of the 2022 Serie A clubs.

Team	City	Stadium	Capacity
9 de Octubre	Guayaquil	Modelo Alberto Spencer Herrera	42,000
Aucas	Quito	Gonzalo Pozo Ripalda	21,689
Barcelona	Guayaquil	Monumental Banco Pichincha	57,267
Cumbayá	Quito	Olímpico Atahualpa	35,258
Delfín	Manta	Jocay	17,834
Deportivo Cuenca	Cuenca	Banco del Austro Alejandro Serrano Aguilar	18,549
Emelec	Guayaquil	George Capwell	40,020
Gualaceo	Azogues	Jorge Andrade Cantos	14,000
Guayaquil City	Guayaquil	Christian Benítez Betancourt	10,152
Independiente del Valle	Quito	Banco Guayaquil	12,000
LDU Quito	Quito	Rodrigo Paz Delgado	41,575
Macará	Ambato	Bellavista Universidad Indoamérica	16,467
Mushuc Runa	Ambato	COAC Mushuc Runa	8,200
Orense	Machala	9 de Mayo	16,456
Técnico Universitario	Ambato	Bellavista Universidad Indoamérica	16,467
Universidad Católica	Quito	Olímpico Atahualpa	35,258

=== Personnel and kits ===
Team	Manager	Kit manufacturer	Shirt sponsor
9 de Octubre	(Spain) David Dóniga	Jasa Evolution	Bridgestone
Aucas	(Venezuela) César Farías	Umbro	BET593
Barcelona	(Argentina) Fabián Bustos	Marathon	Pilsener
Cumbayá	(Ecuador) Patricio Hurtado	Lotto	Geinco
Delfín	(Argentina) Guillermo Duró	Baldo's	La Esquina de Ales
Deportivo Cuenca	(Argentina) Gabriel Schürrer	Lotto	BET593; Banco del Austro; Chubb Seguros
Emelec	(Spain) Ismael Rescalvo	Adidas	BET593
Gualaceo	(Ecuador) Leonardo Vanegas	Boman	Banco del Austro; Municipalidad de Gualaceo
Guayaquil City	(Ecuador) Pool Gavilánez	Astro	Betcris
Independiente del Valle	(Argentina) Martín Anselmi	Marathon	Chery; Banco Guayaquil
LDU Quito	(Argentina) Luis Zubeldía	Puma	Banco Pichincha
Macará	(Ecuador) Marcelo Fleitas	Boman	BET593
Mushuc Runa	(Ecuador) Geovanny Cumbicus	Boman	Cooperativa Mushuc Runa
Orense	(Ecuador) Juan Carlos León	Elohim	Banco de Machala; IncarPalm
Técnico Universitario	(Colombia) Juan Pablo Buch (caretaker)	Boman	Cooperativa San Francisco Ltda.
Universidad Católica	(Argentina) Miguel Rondelli	Umbro	Banco Pichincha; Fundación Crisfe

=== Managerial changes ===
Team	Outgoing manager	Manner of departure	Date of vacancy	Position in table	Incoming manager	Date of appointment
First stage
Cumbayá	(Paraguay) Raúl Duarte	Sacked	13 October 2021	Pre-season	(Ecuador) Luis Espinel	19 October 2021
Delfín	(Argentina) Horacio Montemurro	Mutual agreement	30 November 2021	Pre-season	(Uruguay) Guillermo Sanguinetti	7 December 2021
Deportivo Cuenca	(Uruguay) Guillermo Sanguinetti	Signed by Delfín	7 December 2021	Pre-season	(Argentina) Gabriel Schürrer	17 December 2021
Barcelona	(Argentina) Fabián Bustos	Signed by Santos	26 February 2022	1st	(Argentina) Jorge Célico (Note: Segundo Castillo was the caretaker manager for the second leg of the 2022 Copa Libertadores second stage.)	26 February 2022
LDU Quito	(Argentina) Pablo Marini	Resigned	5 April 2022	4th	(Ecuador) Édison Méndez (Note: Caretaker manager.)	6 April 2022
Aucas	(Venezuela) Héctor Bidoglio	Mutual agreement	17 April 2022	9th	(Argentina) Nelson Videla	18 April 2022
Aucas	(Argentina) Nelson Videla	End of caretaker spell	25 April 2022	8th	(Venezuela) César Farías	25 April 2022
LDU Quito	(Ecuador) Édison Méndez	End of caretaker spell	28 April 2022	2nd	(Argentina) Luis Zubeldía	22 April 2022
Técnico Universitario	(Colombia) José Eugenio Hernández	Mutual agreement	9 May 2022	15th	(Argentina) Juan Urquiza	9 May 2022
Cumbayá	(Ecuador) Luis Espinel	Mutual agreement	11 May 2022	13th	(Ecuador) Gerardo Sanmartín	12 May 2022
Cumbayá	(Ecuador) Gerardo Sanmartín	End of caretaker spell	20 May 2022	13th	(Ecuador) Carlos Calderón	20 May 2022
Second stage
Independiente del Valle	(Portugal) Renato Paiva	Signed by León	29 May 2022	Pre-tournament	(Argentina) Martín Anselmi	30 May 2022
Técnico Universitario	(Argentina) Juan Urquiza	Sacked	6 June 2022	Pre-tournament	(Spain) Iván Vázquez	6 June 2022
Macará	(Ecuador) Paúl Vélez	Sacked	1 August 2022	14th	(Ecuador) Marcelo Fleitas	1 August 2022
9 de Octubre	(Ecuador) Juan Carlos León	Sacked	2 August 2022	10th	(Ecuador) Silvano Estacio (Note: Originally as caretaker manager, appointed on a permanent basis on 19 August 2022.)	2 August 2022
Técnico Universitario	(Spain) Iván Vázquez	Sacked	9 August 2022	16th	(Colombia) Juan Pablo Buch	9 August 2022
Orense	(Spain) Andrés García	Resigned	12 August 2022	11th	(Ecuador) Juan Carlos León	13 August 2022
Delfín	(Uruguay) Guillermo Sanguinetti	Resigned	30 August 2022	12th	(Argentina) Guillermo Duró	31 August 2022
9 de Octubre	(Ecuador) Silvano Estacio	Replaced	31 August 2022	15th	(Spain) David Dóniga	31 August 2022
Barcelona	(Argentina) Jorge Célico	Mutual agreement	4 September 2022	6th	(Argentina) Fabián Bustos	5 September 2022
Cumbayá	(Ecuador) Carlos Calderón	Sacked	6 September 2022	13th	(Ecuador) Patricio Hurtado	9 September 2022

== First stage ==
The first stage began on 18 February and ended on 29 May 2022.

=== Standings ===
Pos	Team	Pld	W	D	L	GF	GA	GD	Pts	Qualification
1	Barcelona	15	9	3	3	24	11	+13	30	Advance to Finals and qualification for Copa Libertadores group stage
2	Universidad Católica	15	9	2	4	31	17	+14	29	
3	LDU Quito	15	9	2	4	26	22	+4	29	
4	Independiente del Valle	15	8	3	4	16	12	+4	27	
5	Aucas	15	7	5	3	23	17	+6	26	
6	Emelec	15	6	5	4	23	15	+8	23	
7	Delfín	15	6	4	5	16	18	−2	22	
8	Deportivo Cuenca	15	5	6	4	12	14	−2	21	
9	Gualaceo	15	6	2	7	18	23	−5	20	
10	Mushuc Runa	15	5	4	6	19	21	−2	19	
11	Guayaquil City	15	4	6	5	22	20	+2	18	
12	Orense	15	4	6	5	14	13	+1	18	
13	Macará	15	3	4	8	12	19	−7	13	
14	Cumbayá	15	3	4	8	12	23	−11	13	
15	Técnico Universitario	15	2	4	9	12	24	−12	10	
16	9 de Octubre	15	1	6	8	15	26	−11	9	

Source: LigaPro, Soccerway
Rules for classification: 1) Points, 2) Goal difference, 3) Goals for, 4) Away goals for, 5) Head-to-head record, 6) Drawing of lots.

=== Results ===
Home \ Away	9OC	AUC	BSC	CUM	DEL	CUE	EME	GUA	GCY	IDV	LDQ	MAC	MUS	ORE	TEC	CAT
9 de Octubre	—	—	1–3	—	0–1	—	—	1–1	2–2	1–1	—	1–1	2–0	—	—	0–4
Aucas	1–1	—	2–1	1–0	3–0	0–0	—	—	—	—	—	2–0	—	—	—	3–2
Barcelona	—	—	—	4–0	—	1–1	1–1	0–1	—	2–0	—	—	—	2–0	1–0	—
Cumbayá	3–2	—	—	—	—	0–1	1–1	—	—	0–1	0–2	—	—	1–1	2–0	—
Delfín	—	—	0–1	1–1	—	0–0	—	1–0	—	0–1	—	1–0	—	2–1	—	—
Deportivo Cuenca	1–1	—	—	—	—	—	2–2	2–1	—	—	2–0	—	—	1–1	1–0	0–2
Emelec	2–1	1–0	—	—	1–2	—	—	—	2–2	—	2–0	4–0	4–0	—	—	0–1
Gualaceo	—	1–4	—	0–1	—	—	2–1	—	2–1	1–3	—	2–1	3–2	2–1	—	—
Guayaquil City	—	4–0	1–4	4–1	1–1	3–0 (Note: Match ended after 30 minutes of play and awarded to Guayaquil City by walkover due to the withdrawal of Deportivo Cuenca player Jhon Mero by injury, leaving the team below the minimum number of players required per tournament regulations (seven). The score at the time of suspension was 2–0.)	—	—	—	—	2–2	—	—	—	0–1	—
Independiente del Valle	—	1–0	—	—	—	2–0	0–1	—	0–0	—	1–0	—	0–1	1–1	—	—
LDU Quito	2–0	4–4	2–0	—	3–2	—	—	1–0	—	—	—	3–2	3–2	—	—	2–1
Macará	—	—	0–1	0–0	—	0–1	—	—	2–0	0–1	—	—	—	1–0	3–1	—
Mushuc Runa	—	1–1	1–1	4–2	1–2	1–0	—	—	2–0	—	—	0–0	—	—	—	1–2
Orense	2–1	1–1	—	—	—	—	2–0	—	0–1	—	3–0	—	0–0	—	0–0	1–0
Técnico Universitario	2–1	0–1	—	—	1–1	—	1–1	1–1	—	2–3	1–2	—	1–3	—	—	—
Universidad Católica	—	—	1–2	1–0	4–2	—	—	3–1	1–1	3–1	—	2–2	—	—	4–1	—

Source: LigaPro, Soccerway
Legend: Blue = home team win; Yellow = draw; Red = away team win.

== Second stage ==
The second stage began on 8 July and ended on 23 October 2022.

=== Standings ===
Pos	Team	Pld	W	D	L	GF	GA	GD	Pts	Qualification
1	Aucas	15	9	6	0	28	9	+19	33	Advance to Finals and qualification for Copa Libertadores group stage
2	Independiente del Valle	15	9	2	4	20	16	+4	29	
3	Universidad Católica	15	8	3	4	22	12	+10	27	
4	LDU Quito	15	7	5	3	23	17	+6	26	
5	Emelec	15	7	4	4	22	15	+7	25	
6	Deportivo Cuenca	15	6	4	5	18	16	+2	22	
7	Técnico Universitario	15	6	4	5	20	20	0	22	
8	Barcelona	15	5	6	4	24	19	+5	21	
9	Delfín	15	5	4	6	17	19	−2	19	
10	Orense	15	4	6	5	16	17	−1	18	
11	Cumbayá	15	4	6	5	15	16	−1	18	
12	Guayaquil City	15	4	5	6	15	17	−2	17	
13	Gualaceo	15	4	2	9	10	23	−13	14	
14	Mushuc Runa	15	2	6	7	12	22	−10	12	
15	Macará	15	2	5	8	17	28	−11	11	
16	9 de Octubre	15	2	4	9	12	25	−13	10	

Source: LigaPro, Soccerway
Rules for classification: 1) Points, 2) Goal difference, 3) Goals for, 4) Away goals for, 5) Head-to-head record, 6) Drawing of lots.

=== Results ===
Home \ Away	9OC	AUC	BSC	CUM	DEL	CUE	EME	GUA	GCY	IDV	LDQ	MAC	MUS	ORE	TEC	CAT
9 de Octubre	—	1–2	—	0–1	—	1–0	0–3	—	—	—	2–2	—	—	0–0	2–0	—
Aucas	—	—	—	—	—	—	1–1	3–0	2–1	5–0	1–1	—	0–0	2–0	5–2	—
Barcelona	2–2	0–2	—	—	0–1	—	—	—	1–1	—	1–1	5–3	4–1	—	—	0–0
Cumbayá	—	0–0	1–1	—	2–1	—	—	1–2	3–0	—	—	1–0	1–1	—	—	0–0
Delfín	3–1	0–0	—	—	—	—	0–3	—	1–3	—	3–0	—	0–0	—	0–0	2–1
Deportivo Cuenca	—	1–2	2–1	1–1	3–2	—	—	—	1–0	2–1	—	1–1	3–1	—	—	—
Emelec	—	—	1–3	1–0	—	3–1	—	2–1	—	2–3	—	—	—	0–0	3–1	—
Gualaceo	1–0	—	2–1	—	2–1	0–0	—	—	—	—	0–1	—	—	—	0–3	0–1
Guayaquil City	1–1	—	—	—	—	—	0–0	1–0	—	0–1	—	0–0	4–1	1–1	—	2–0
Independiente del Valle	1–0	—	1–1	2–0	2–0	—	—	2–0	—	—	—	1–0	—	—	0–1	1–2
LDU Quito	—	—	—	1–0	—	1–1	2–0	—	2–0	2–2	—	—	—	1–2	2–0	—
Macará	3–1	1–1	—	—	1–2	—	1–3	1–1	—	—	0–5	—	3–0	—	—	1–3
Mushuc Runa	3–1	—	—	—	—	—	0–0	2–0	—	0–1	1–2	—	—	1–1	0–0	—
Orense	—	—	1–2	3–1	1–1	1–0	—	4–1	—	1–2	—	1–1	—	—	—	—
Técnico Universitario	—	—	0–2	3–3	—	1–0	—	—	3–1	—	—	3–1	—	2–0	—	1–1
Universidad Católica	3–0	1–2	—	—	—	0–2	2–0	—	—	—	4–0	—	2–1	2–0	—	—

Source: LigaPro, Soccerway
Legend: Blue = home team win; Yellow = draw; Red = away team win.

== Finals ==
The finals (Third stage) were played by Barcelona (first stage winners) and Aucas (second stage winners). The winners of the double-legged series were crowned as Serie A champions and earned the Ecuador 1 berth in the 2023 Copa Libertadores, and the losers were the Serie A runners-up and earned the Ecuador 2 berth in the Copa Libertadores. By having the greater number of points in the aggregate table, Aucas played the second leg at home.

6 November 2022
16:00 UTC−5

Barcelona	0–1	Aucas
	Report	Vega 65'

Estadio Monumental Isidro Romero Carbo, Guayaquil
Referee: Augusto Aragón

13 November 2022
18:00 UTC−5

Aucas	0–0	Barcelona
	Report

Estadio Gonzalo Pozo Ripalda, Quito
Referee: Luis Quiroz

Aucas won 1–0 on aggregate.

== Aggregate table ==
Pos	Team	Pld	W	D	L	GF	GA	GD	Pts	Qualification or relegation
1	Aucas (C)	30	16	11	3	51	26	+25	59	Qualification for Copa Libertadores group stage
2	Universidad Católica	30	17	5	8	53	29	+24	56	Qualification for Copa Libertadores second stage
3	Independiente del Valle	30	17	5	8	36	28	+8	56	Qualification for Copa Libertadores group stage (Note: Independiente del Valle qualified for the 2023 Copa Libertadores group stage by winning the 2022 Copa Sudamericana.)
4	LDU Quito	30	16	7	7	49	39	+10	55	Qualification for Copa Sudamericana first stage
5	Barcelona	30	14	9	7	48	30	+18	51	Qualification for Copa Libertadores group stage
6	Emelec	30	13	9	8	45	30	+15	48	Qualification for Copa Sudamericana first stage
7	Deportivo Cuenca	30	11	10	9	30	30	0	43	Qualification for Copa Sudamericana first stage
8	Delfín	30	11	8	11	33	37	−4	41	Qualification for Copa Sudamericana first stage
9	Orense	30	8	12	10	30	30	0	36	
10	Guayaquil City	30	8	11	11	37	37	0	35	
11	Gualaceo	30	10	4	16	28	46	−18	34	
12	Técnico Universitario	30	8	8	14	32	44	−12	32	
13	Mushuc Runa	30	7	10	13	31	43	−12	31	
14	Cumbayá	30	7	10	13	27	39	−12	31	
15	Macará (R)	30	5	9	16	29	47	−18	24	Relegation to Serie B
16	9 de Octubre (R)	30	3	10	17	27	51	−24	19	Relegation to Serie B

Source: LigaPro
Rules for classification: 1) Points, 2) Goal difference, 3) Goals for, 4) Away goals for, 5) Head-to-head record, 6) Drawing of lots.
(C) Champions; (R) Relegated

== Top scorers ==
Rank	Name	Club	Goals
1	(Argentina) Francisco Fydriszewski	Aucas	15
2	(Argentina) Tomás Molina	LDU Quito	14
3	(Panama) Ismael Díaz	Universidad Católica	13
4	(Ecuador) Gabriel Cortez	Barcelona / 9 de Octubre	12
5	(Ecuador) Jhon Cifuente	Delfín / Barcelona	11
5	(Argentina) Santiago Giordana	Mushuc Runa	11
7	(Ecuador) Alexander Alvarado	LDU Quito	10
7	(Paraguay) Leonardo Villagra	Orense	10
7	(Uruguay) Joaquín Vergés	Gualaceo / 9 de Octubre	10
10	(Argentina) Lucas Mancinelli	Deportivo Cuenca	9
10	(Colombia) Cristian Martínez Borja	Universidad Católica	9
10	(Uruguay) Sebastián Rodríguez	Emelec	9

Source: Ecuagol

== See also ==
- 2022 Copa Ecuador
- 2022 Ecuadorian Serie B
- 2022 Segunda Categoría
