= Renato Salas =

Ecuadorian football manager

Personal information
- Full name: Franklin Renato Salas Baldeón
- Date of birth: 15 February 1970 (age 56)
- Place of birth: Quito, Ecuador

Managerial career
- Years: Team
- Universidad Católica del Ecuador (youth)
- 2007: Universidad Católica del Ecuador (interim)
- 2008: Universidad Católica del Ecuador (interim)
- 2009–2010: Universidad Católica del Ecuador
- 2010: Técnico Universitario
- 2010: Aucas
- 2011: Deportivo Azogues
- 2012: Mushuc Runa
- 2015–2017: Deportivo Quito (reserves)
- 2015: Deportivo Quito (interim)
- 2015: Deportivo Quito (interim)
- 2017–2019: Deportivo Quito
- 2019: Clan Juvenil
- 2023: Mushuc Runa (interim)
- 2023–2024: Mushuc Runa

Franklin Renato Salas Baldeón (born 15 February 1970) is an Ecuadorian football manager.

== Career ==
Salas began his career working in the youth sides of Universidad Católica del Ecuador, being an interim manager of the first team on some occasions before being named manager of the side on 9 December 2008. He achieved promotion to the Ecuadorian Serie A in his first season in charge, but was sacked on 1 March 2010.

Salas was appointed Técnico Universitario manager on 5 April 2010, with the club in the Ecuadorian Serie B. On 15 September, he took over fellow league team Aucas, but left at the end of the season.

Salas began the 2011 season at Deportivo Azogues also in division two, but was dismissed in June. He was in charge of Mushuc Runa in the following year, and later joined the reserve sides of Deportivo Quito.

Salas was an interim manager of Deportivo Quito on two occasions during the 2015 campaign, after the departures of Paúl Vélez and Carlos Sevilla. On 14 February 2017, he was permanently appointed manager of the side, now in the Segunda Categoría.

Salas left Quito on 2 April 2019, and took over Clan Juvenil in the second level thirteen days later. He returned to Mushuc Runa in the following year, as a sporting director.

On 29 May 2023, Salas was named interim manager of the Ponchito, after Geovanny Cumbicus was sacked. On 21 June, he was definitely appointed manager of the club for the second stage of the 2023 season.

Salas was sacked from the Ponchito on 27 April 2024, following a 5–0 loss to Deportivo Cuenca.
