= Fabián Frías =

Argentine football manager

Personal information
- Full name: Fabián Alberto Frías
- Date of birth: 5 March 1971 (age 55)
- Place of birth: Buenos Aires, Argentina
- Position: Goalkeeper

Senior career*
Years	Team	Apps	(Gls)
- Colegiales
- Excursionistas
- Chacarita Juniors
- Platense
- Central Ballester

Managerial career
- 2011: Sporting Cristal (assistant)
- 2013: Deportivo Cuenca (assistant)
- 2013: Deportivo Cuenca
- 2015: Excursionistas
- 2016: Gualaceo
- 2017: Colón de Manabí
- 2017–2018: Gualaceo
- 2018–2019: Técnico Universitario
- 2019: Atlético Porteño
- 2019–2021: Manta
- 2022–2023: Manta
- 2023–2024: Gualaceo
- 2025: Olmedo
- 2025: Mushuc Runa
- * Club domestic league appearances and goals

Fabián Alberto Frías (born 5 March 1971) is an Argentine football manager and former player who played as a goalkeeper.

== Career ==
Born in Buenos Aires, Frías represented Colegiales, Excursionistas, Chacarita Juniors, Platense and Central Ballester. He retired at the age of 29, and started working as a fitness coach at Platense, Atlanta, All Boys, Deportivo Morón, River Plate and Sportivo Italiano.

In 2011, Frías moved to Peru and joined Guillermo Rivarola's staff at Sporting Cristal, as his assistant. He was also Rivarola's assistant at Deportivo Cuenca in 2013, and was named manager in April of that year after Rivarola left.

Frías left Cuenca in December 2013, and was named in charge of former club Excursionistas back in his home country on 23 December 2014. He resigned from the latter club the following 7 May, and returned to Ecuador on 20 January 2016 after being named manager of Gualaceo.

On 8 December 2016, after narrowly missing out promotion, Farías took over fellow Serie B team Colón de Manabí. He left the club in June, and returned to Gualaceo in the following month.

Frías resigned from Gualaceo on 24 April 2018, and was appointed Técnico Universitario manager on 24 July. He was dismissed on 30 April 2019, and was named in charge of Atlético Porteño on 27 May.

Frías left Porteño on 30 August 2019, and was appointed manager of Manta. He helped the club in their promotion to the Serie A in 2020, after finishing second.

Frías left Manta in December 2021, after their relegation, but returned to the club on 15 April 2022. He left again on 20 September 2023, and returned to Gualaceo three days later.

After leaving Gualaceo in May 2024, Frías worked as a general manager of 9 de Octubre and was in charge of Olmedo before returning to the top tier with Mushuc Runa on 22 July 2025. He only lasted three matches at the latter before being sacked on 7 August.
