= Iván Vázquez =

Iván Vázquez may refer to:

- Iván Vázquez Mellado (born 1982), Mexican football goalkeeper
- Iván Vázquez Rodríguez (born 1988), Spanish football manager

== See also ==
- Iván Vásquez, Chilean football midfielder
