= J Lunico =

- Born: Jairo Andres Tacuri Segarra; December 5, 1993 (age 32); Gualaceo Canton
- Genres: Reggaeton, hip hop
- Occupations: Singer, rapper
- Instruments: Vocals, keyboards
- Years active: 2015–present
- Website: jlunico.com

Jairo Andres Tacuri Segarra (born December 5, 1993), known by his stage name J Lunico, is an Ecuadorian singer, songwriter, rapper and record producer.

== Early life ==
Tacuri was born in Gualaceo Canton but later migrated to United States in 2001 and was raised in Patchogue, Long Island.

== Career ==
Tacuri originally aimed to be a professional soccer player. He played for Pat-Med Express of Major League of Soccer in Long Island New York. The team won Waldbaum's Cup Challenge.

In 2015, J Lunico gave an audition in La Banda. Lunico was chosen out of 18,000 participants to go to Miami, Florida for next rounds. However, he couldn't make it to the finals. In 2016, J Lunico made a collaboration with Mozart La Para and La Materialista. They released a single called "En pariseo".

J.Lunico toured the Dominican Republic, Ecuador and Colombia in collaboration with Mozart La Para and La Materialista. In 2018, J Lunico released his first album called Milenios which included rhythms of reggaeton, merengue electronico, and pop reggaeton.
