= Restrepia portillae =

Conservation status
- CITES Appendix II

Scientific classification
- Kingdom: Plantae
- Clade: Tracheophytes
- Clade: Angiosperms
- Clade: Monocots
- Order: Asparagales
- Family: Orchidaceae
- Subfamily: Epidendroideae
- Genus: Restrepia
- Species: R. portillae

Binomial name
- Restrepia portillae Luer

Species of flowering plant

Restrepia portillae is a species of flowering plant in the family Orchidaceae. It is an epiphyte native to Ecuador. The species was described in 2002, and is listed in Appendix II of CITES.

== Taxonomy ==
The species was described by Carlyle A. Luer in 2002. The holotype was collected by Luer, from Morona-Santiago Province, at an elevation of 2,500 metres (8,200 ft). The type specimen flowered when cultivated in Gualaceo, Ecuador.

== Distribution ==
Restrepia portillae is native to the wet tropical biome of Ecuador.

== Conservation ==
Restrepia portillae is listed in Appendix II of CITES. There are no quotas or suspensions in place for the species.
