= Leonardo Vanegas =

Ecuadorian footballer and manager (born 1982)

Personal information
- Full name: Leonardo Fernando Vanegas Barcia
- Date of birth: 16 July 1982 (age 44)
- Place of birth: Cuenca, Ecuador
- Position: Right back

Senior career*
Years	Team	Apps	(Gls)
2002	LDU Cuenca	1	(0)
2003	Atlético Universitario	8	(0)
2004	Gloria	9	(0)

Managerial career
- 2004–2012: Deportivo Cuenca (youth)
- 2013–2014: Estrella Roja (assistant)
- 2015: Círculo Cruz del Vado
- 2016–2019: Estudiantes Cuenca
- 2020–2021: Gualaceo (assistant)
- 2021–2023: Gualaceo
- 2023: Cumbayá
- * Club domestic league appearances and goals

Leonardo Fernando Vanegas Barcia (born 16 July 1982) is an Ecuadorian football manager and former player who played as a right back.

== Career ==
Born in Cuenca, Vanegas was a right back for lower sides LDU Cuenca, Atlético Universitario and Gloria. He retired in 2004, and became a manager of Deportivo Cuenca's youth categories.

In 2013, Vanegas was an assistant of Daniel Segarra at Estrella Roja, before being named manager of Círculo Cruz del Vado for the 2015 season. In 2016, he took over Estudiantes de Cuenca, before rejoining Segarra's staff at Gualaceo in 2020.

Vanegas became Gualaceo's manager in July 2021, after Segarra left, and led the club to their first-ever promotion to the Serie A in November. He was subsequently kept as manager for the 2022 campaign.

On 18 September 2023, Vanegas resigned from Gualaceo. On 8 November, he replaced Patricio Hurtado at the helm of Cumbayá.
