= Rodrigo Formento =

Uruguayan footballer (born 1999)

Personal information
- Full name: Rodrigo Nicolás Formento Chialanza
- Date of birth: 25 September 1999 (age 27)
- Place of birth: Montevideo, Uruguay
- Height: 1.82 m (6 ft 0 in)
- Position: Goalkeeper

Team information
- Current team: Mushuc Runa
- Number: 25

Youth career
- Cerro

Senior career*
Years	Team	Apps	(Gls)
2019–2022	Cerro	56	(0)
2021	→ Progreso (loan)	25	(0)
2022	→ Coquimbo Unido (loan)	20	(0)
2023	Progreso	0	(0)
2023	→ River Plate Montevideo (loan)	24	(0)
2024	Cerro Largo	24	(0)
2025–	Mushuc Runa	7	(0)

International career
2020	Uruguay U23	2	(0)
- * Club domestic league appearances and goals as of 14 April 2025

Rodrigo Nicolás Formento Chialanza (born 25 September 1999) is a Uruguayan professional footballer who plays as a goalkeeper for Ecuadorian Serie A club Mushuc Runa.

== Club career ==
A youth academy graduate of Cerro, Formento made his professional debut on 13 April 2019 in a 2–0 league defeat against Progreso.

In April 2021, Formento joined Progreso on a season long loan deal. In December 2024, he joined Ecuadorian club Mushuc Runa.

== International career ==
On 29 December 2019, Uruguay under-23 team head coach Gustavo Ferreyra named Formento in 23-man final squad for 2020 CONMEBOL Pre-Olympic Tournament.

== Career statistics ==
=== Club ===
As of 25 March 2021

Appearances and goals by club, season and competition
Club	Season	League			Cup		Continental		Total	
Club	Season	Division	Apps	Goals	Apps	Goals	Apps	Goals	Apps	Goals
Cerro	2019	Uruguayan Primera División	24	0	—		3 (Note: Appearances in Copa Sudamericana.)	0	27	0
Cerro	2020	Uruguayan Primera División	31	0	—		—		31	0
Career total			55	0	0	0	3	0	58	0
