= Juan Pablo Buch =

Colombian football manager

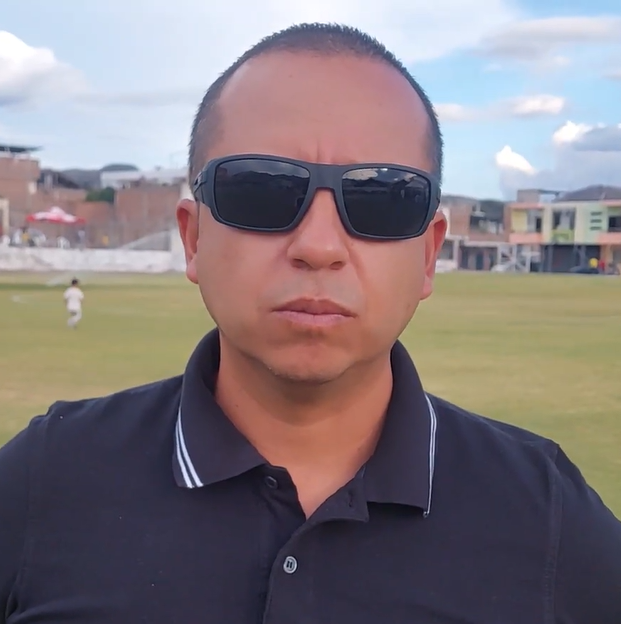
- Buch in 2026

Personal information
- Full name: Juan Pablo Buch Pabón
- Date of birth: 21 November 1986 (age 39)
- Place of birth: Pasto, Colombia

Team information
- Current team: Orense (manager)

Managerial career
- Years: Team
- 2022: Técnico Universitario (interim)
- 2023–2024: Técnico Universitario
- 2024: Delfín
- 2024: Águilas Doradas
- 2025: Cumbayá
- 2025: Aucas
- 2026: Zacatecoluca
- 2026: Libertad FC
- 2026–: Orense

Juan Pablo Buch Pabón (born 21 November 1986) is a Colombian football manager, currently in charge of Ecuadorian club Orense.

== Career ==
Buch worked as a fitness coach for Universitario Popayán, Deportes Quindío and Alianza Petrolera back in his home country, before joining Cheche Hernández's staff at Ecuadorian side Técnico Universitario in 2019.

In August 2022, after manager Iván Vázquez was sacked, Buch was named interim manager of the first team. After taking over the club in the last position, he led the side to an impressive run of six wins and two draws in ten matches, and managed to avoid relegation.

On 25 October 2022, Buch was confirmed as manager of Técnico for the 2023 season, after renewing his contract. On 19 December 2023, after qualifying the club for the 2024 Copa Sudamericana, he renewed his link for a further year, but left on a mutual agreement the following 19 March.

On 9 May 2024, Buch replaced sacked Guillermo Duró at the helm of Delfín also in the Ecuadorian top tier. He was himself dismissed from the club on 16 September, and returned to his country on 8 October to take over of Águilas Doradas.

Buch was sacked by Águilas on 21 November 2024, and returned to Ecuador the following 17 August to take over Cumbayá. On 6 October, he returned to the top tier after being announced as manager of Aucas, but departed the club the following 4 January.

In February 2026, Buch moved to El Salvador to take over Zacatecoluca, but was sacked in April, and returned to Ecuador on 4 May, after being named at the helm of Libertad FC. On 24 September, he left to take over fellow league team Orense.
