= Gabriel del Valle =

Argentine footballer and manager

Personal information
- Full name: Gabriel del Valle Medina
- Date of birth: 3 December 1970 (age 55)
- Place of birth: Buenos Aires, Argentina
- Height: 1.78 m (5 ft 10 in)
- Position: Defender

Team information
- Current team: Newell's Old Boys (youth manager)

Youth career
- River Plate

Senior career*
Years	Team	Apps	(Gls)
1991–1992	River Plate	5	(0)
1992–1993	Lanús	9	(0)
1993–1994	Sarmiento	37	(3)
1994–1996	Nueva Chicago	66	(2)
1996–1997	Deportivo Morón	29	(8)
1998–1999	Cipolletti	33	(10)
1999–2000	Gimnasia y Tiro	28	(1)
2001–2002	LDU Quito	50	(0)
2003	Técnico Universitario	17	(0)
2003–2004	Aldosivi	35	(0)
2005	Temperley	14	(0)
2006–2007	Oriente Petrolero	6	(0)
Total		329	(24)

Managerial career
- 2008–2018: Lanús (youth)
- 2019: Aucas (assistant)
- 2020: Blooming (assistant)
- 2021: Mitre (SdE) (assistant)
- 2022: Deportivo Cuenca (assistant)
- 2023: Deportivo Cuenca
- 2024–: Newell's Old Boys (youth)
- 2024: Newell's Old Boys (interim)
- * Club domestic league appearances and goals

Gabriel del Valle Medina (born 3 December 1970) is an Argentine football manager and former player who played as a defender. He is the current manager of Newell's Old Boys' youth categories.

== Playing career ==
Born in Buenos Aires, del Valle began his career with hometown side River Plate, making his senior debut in 1991. He moved to fellow Primera División side Lanús in the following years, but only remained one season at his new side, after featuring rarely.

From 1994 onwards, del Valle played for Primera B Nacional sides Sarmiento, Nueva Chicago, Deportivo Morón, Cipolletti and Gimnasia y Tiro, before moving abroad for the 2001 season, with Ecuadorian side LDU Quito. He helped the latter bounce back to the Serie A in 2001 as a starter, before featuring more sparingly in 2002 and subsequently signing for Técnico Universitario.

In 2003, del Valle returned to his home country and joined Aldosivi in the Torneo Federal A. He then played for Primera B Metropolitana side Temperley in 2005, before again moving abroad in the following year with Oriente Petrolero; he retired with the latter in 2007, aged 36.

== Managerial career ==
After retiring, del Valle returned to his former side Lanús and worked as a manager in the youth categories. In 2016, he was also an assistant of Ariel Paolorossi in the Argentina national under-20 team during the 2016 COTIF Tournament.

In 2019, del Valle joined Gabriel Schürrer's staff at Ecuadorian club Aucas, as his assistant. He followed Schürrer to Blooming, Mitre (SdE) and Deportivo Cuenca under the same role, before being named manager of the latter on 12 December 2022, with Juan Zubeldía.

del Valle and Zubeldía both left Cuenca on a mutual agreement on 3 May 2023.
