= Gualaceo Canton =

Santiago de Gualaceo
- Canton
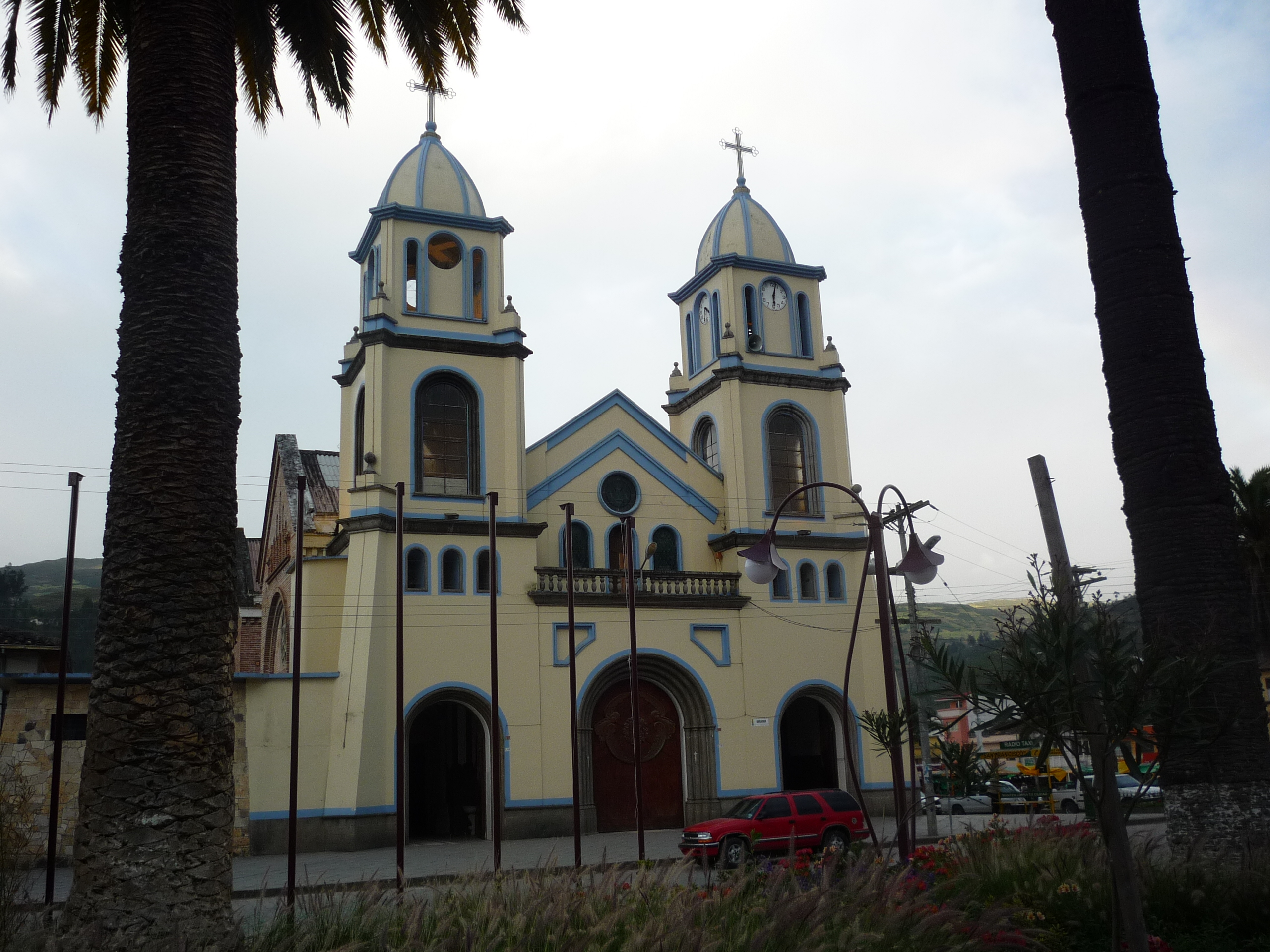
- Gualaceo's Main Church

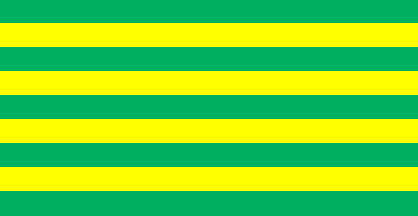
- Flag Seal
- Motto: Justo Y Fuerte
- Location Ecuador

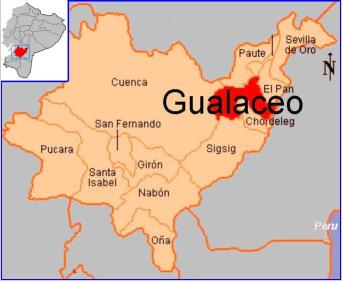
- Location Gualaceo
- Coordinates: 2°54′0″S 78°47′0″W
- Country: Ecuador
- Province: Azuay
- Parishes: Gualaceo; San Juan; Mariano Moreno; Remigio Crespo; Luis Cordero; Jadan; Zhidmad
- Settled: 1534
- Canton: June 25, 1824

Government
  - Mayor: Marco Tapia

Area
  - Total: 345.9 km^{2} (133.6 sq mi)
- Elevation: 2,449 m (8,035 ft)

Population (2022 census)
  - Total: 43,188
  - Density: 124.9/km^{2} (323.4/sq mi)
- Time zone: UTC-5 (GMT-5:00 (Quito, Bogota, Lima))
- Website: www.gualaceo.gob.ec

Gualaceo Canton, nicknamed “El Jardin del Azuay” (The Garden of Azuay), is a canton in the sierra region of Ecuador in the Azuay Province, It is the second most important canton in the province of Azuay. The seat of the canton Gualaceo, is located 36 km east from the city of Cuenca and is one of the biggest cities in Azuay.

Gualaceo Canton has a population of 43,188. It is crossed by the three rivers Santa Bárbara, San Francisco and Guaymincay, and carries the nickname “El Jardin del Azuay” due to the natural surroundings and mountains. The city of Gualaceo holds the title of Cultural Heritage of the Nation, a designation granted on 31 December 2002 by the National Institute of Cultural Heritage of Ecuador, The protected Historic Centre covers a surface area of 46.4 hectares and encompasses 208 catalogued heritage buildings, including colonial architecture and streets paved with andesite stone. Gualaceo became an independent canton on the 25 June 1824.

== History ==
The etymology of the name, "GUALACEO", is derived from a cañari word modified from the Chibcha word Gualaca meaning “macaw’s settlement”; it was a Cañari settlement for long time, belonging to the Kingdom of Quito, until it was conquered by the Incas.

In the year 1531 - 1532, the Inca Empire of Tahuantinsuyo ended with the death of the last monarch Atahualpa, at the hands of the conquerors that came from the old world, led by Sebastián de Benalcázar whose presence marks the start of the Spanish colonization.

With the arrival of the Spaniards begins the phase of the colony of Gualaceo. The conquerors penetrated to all the corners of the Kingdom of Quito, and Sebastián of Banalcázar, assisted by the caciques (overlords) Llivicura (Gualaceo) and Duma (Sigsig) and other cañaris, explored the valley of the Tomebamba; they climbed the slopes of Dotaxí and Cristo Rey and arrived at Gualaceo, a marvelous place due to the landscape and the rivers that reflected the shine of gold.

In April 1534, Benalcázar and his troops established the first mining camp and settlement at the edges of the wider river named Santa Barbara; Benalcázar also named the tributaries San Francisco and San José, while the other 2 tributaries still conserve their cañari names: Guaymincay and Shío.

The Spaniards remained in the valley of Gualaceo for many years, documents suggest that from 1534 until 1549 was only a mining camp without an organized population.

210 years passed since the first mining settlement was established until, in July 1757, Gualaceo was elevated to an ecclesiastical parish of Cuenca, governed by a party judge lieutenant Manuél Dávila Chica and its vicar José Villavicencio.

Manuel Dávila Chica, as leader of the region, contributed to the independence of Cuenca, with men, horses, cedar wood, walnuts and other foodstuffs.

The Independence of Cuenca and the whole Ecuador led to a more republican style of government, initially belonging to the Great Colombia with the Departments of Venezuela, Cundinamarca and Quito.

In 1824 the Congress of Colombia proclaimed the department of Azuay formed by the provinces of Cuenca, Loja and Jaén of Bracamoros & Mainas.

The Cantons of the province of Cuenca are: Cuenca, Gualaceo, Cañar and Girón. This pronouncement was sanctioned by Francisco of Paula Santander president responsible for Colombia on June 25, 1824. Date in which is considered Gualaceo was declared canton.

== Traditions and festivals ==
In Gualaceo, artisans still produce traditional products the original way. The tradition of weaving macanas is passed on through families in the canton and tourists can learn more about this practice in the homes of artisans in and around Gualaceo. In the central plaza, one can buy products carved of wood or paja toquilla, the material the famous straw hat is made of. In October 2021, Gualaceo was officially designated a "World Crafts City" by the World Crafts Council (WCC), a non-governmental organisation affiliated with UNESCO, in recognition of the creativity of its artisans, particularly those who produce traditional garments woven using the ikat technique.

Other than having a lot to offer when it comes to artisanal tradition, Gualaceo also has a lot of festivals celebrating the culture of the canton. The staged battle between the Christians and the Moors on the 24 June, one day before the celebration of the cantonization, is only one example of how the city celebrates its history. Other festivals include the carnival in February, which the city is known for in the whole of Azuay, the Pass of the Child and the celebration of the declaration as a World Heritage Site.

Another festival is dedicated to the local drink called rosero which is unique to Gualaceo and usually consumed with a quesadilla. Gualaceo also offers more national delicacies, like cuy or hornado in the central market called mercardo de 25 Julio.

The canton also has a history of exporting orchids nationally and internationally as the climatic conditions around Gualaceo are perfect for the delicate flower. The orchid farm Ecuagenera, located on the Gualaceo–Bullcay route, is the largest orchid garden in Ecuador. It maintains 32 greenhouses housing more than 2,500 orchid species out of the 4,500 that exist in the country, most of them native.

== Gualaceo Photo Gallery ==
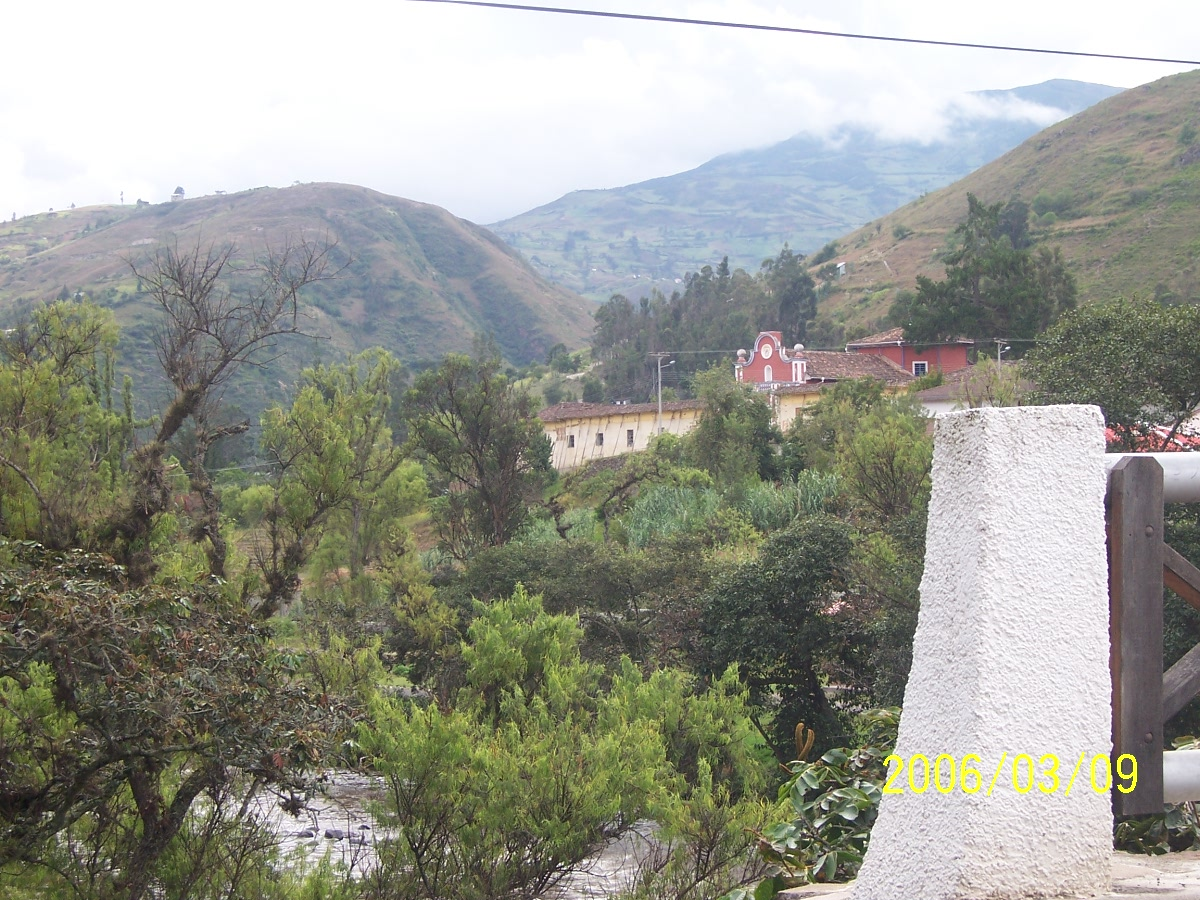
Gualaceo riverfront

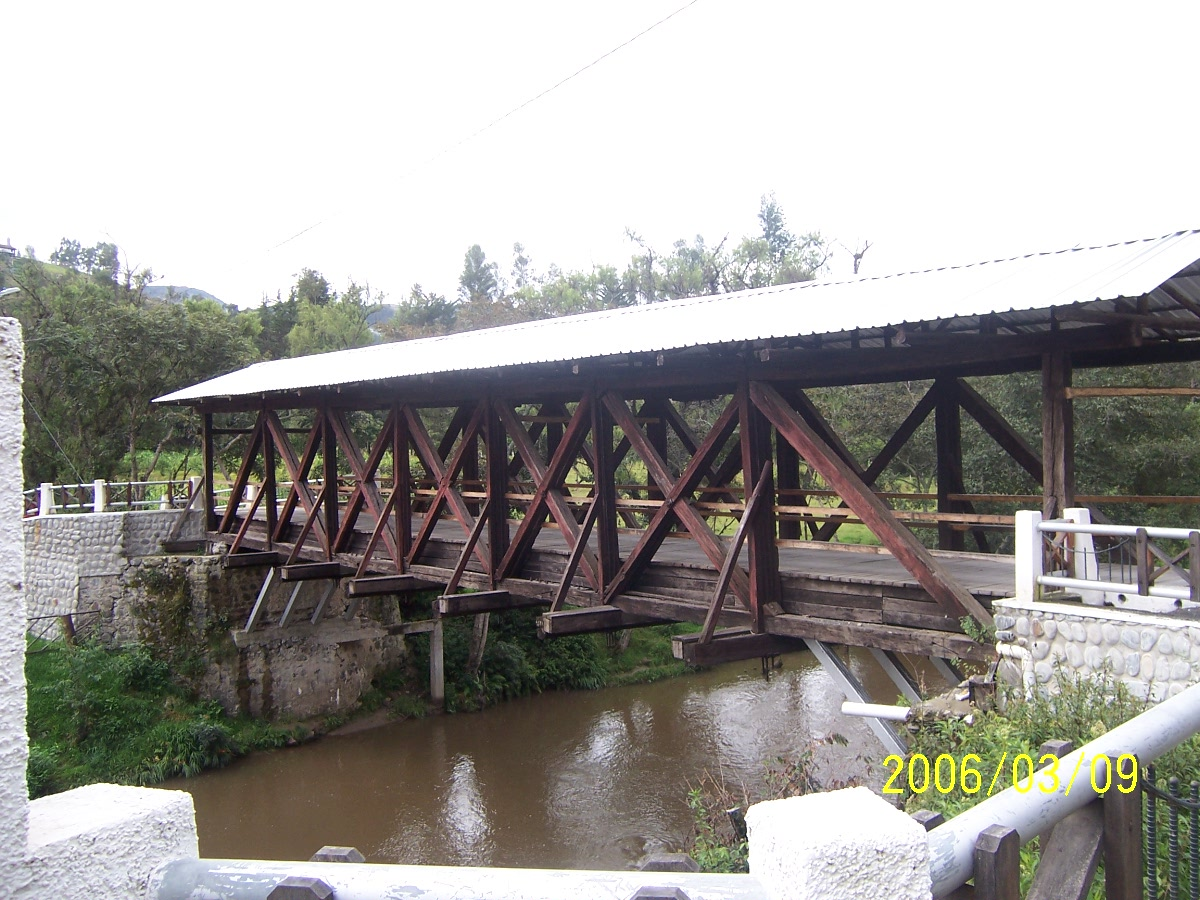
Gualaceo riverfront

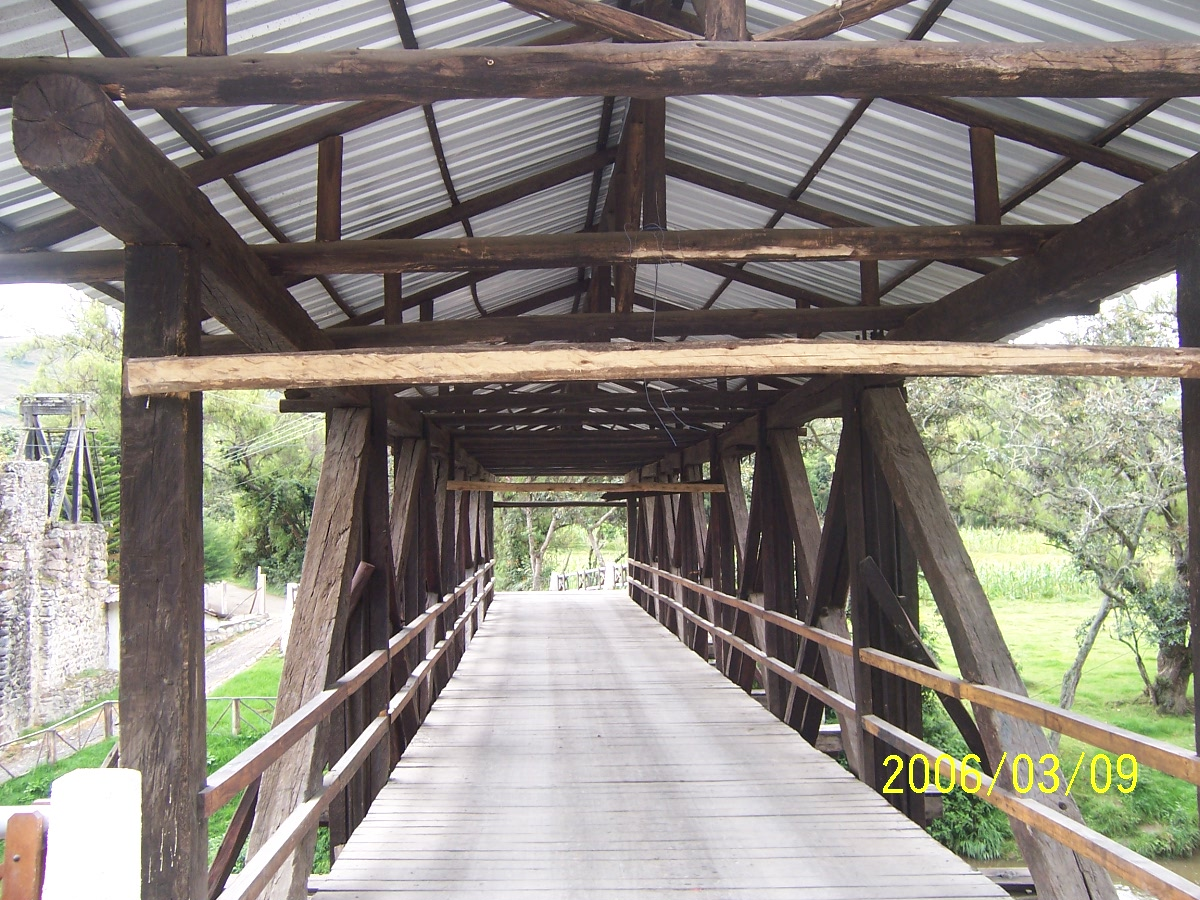
Gualaceo riverfront

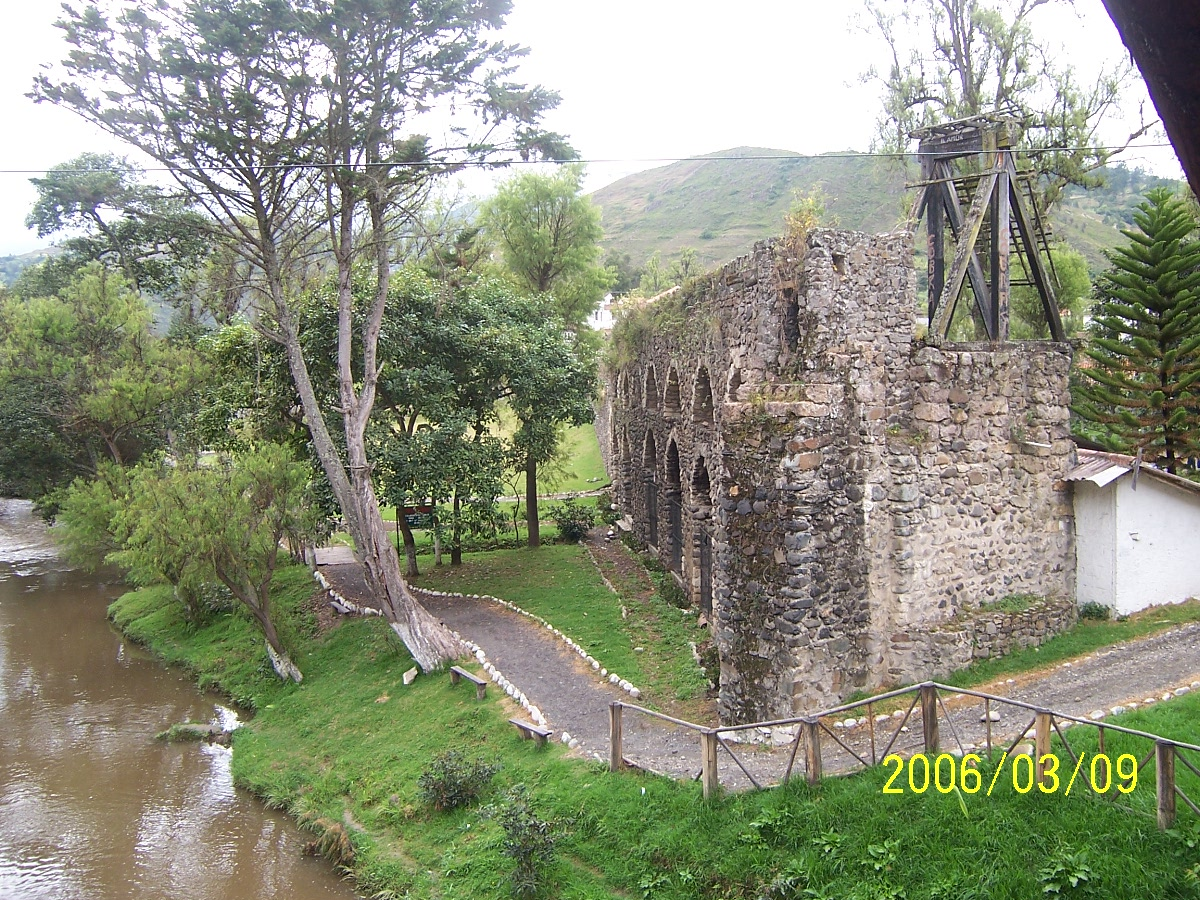
Gualaceo riverfront

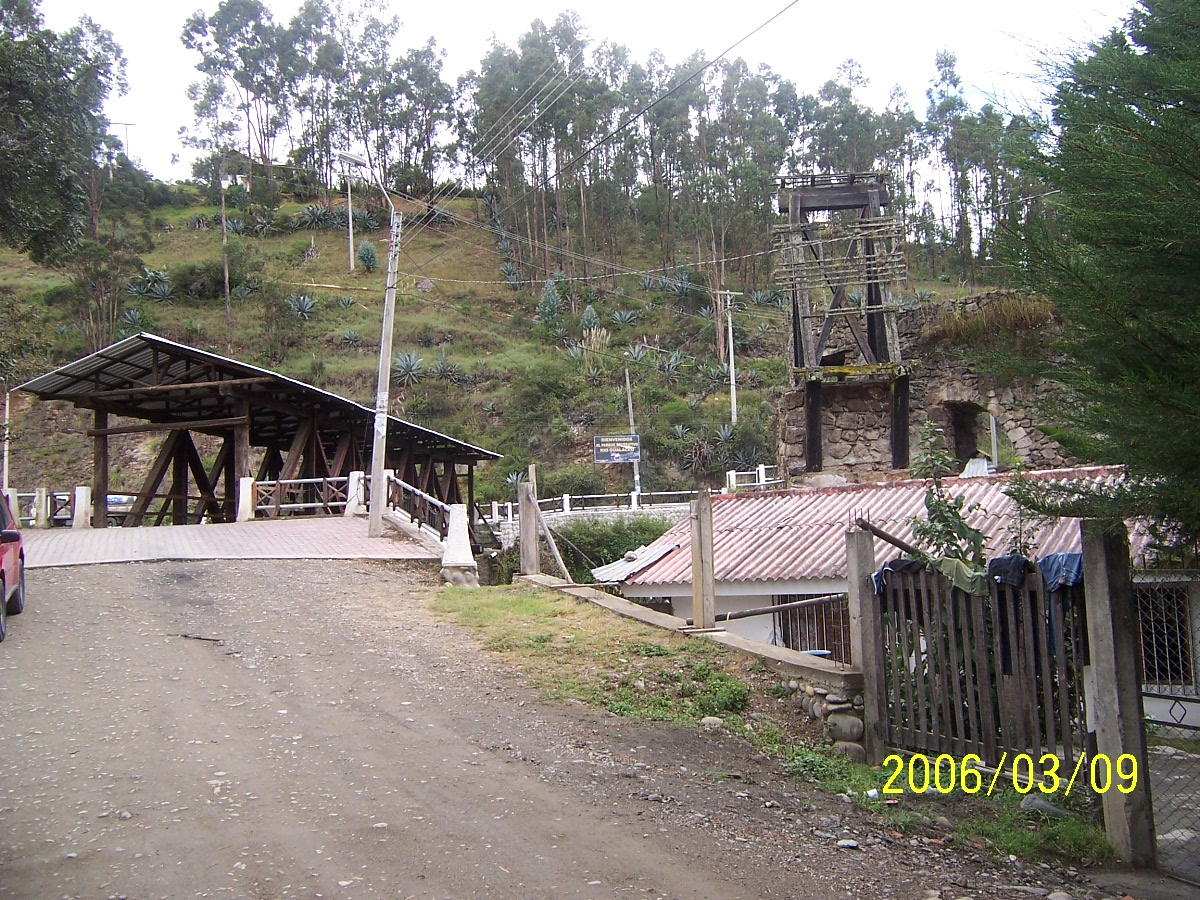
Gualaceo riverfront

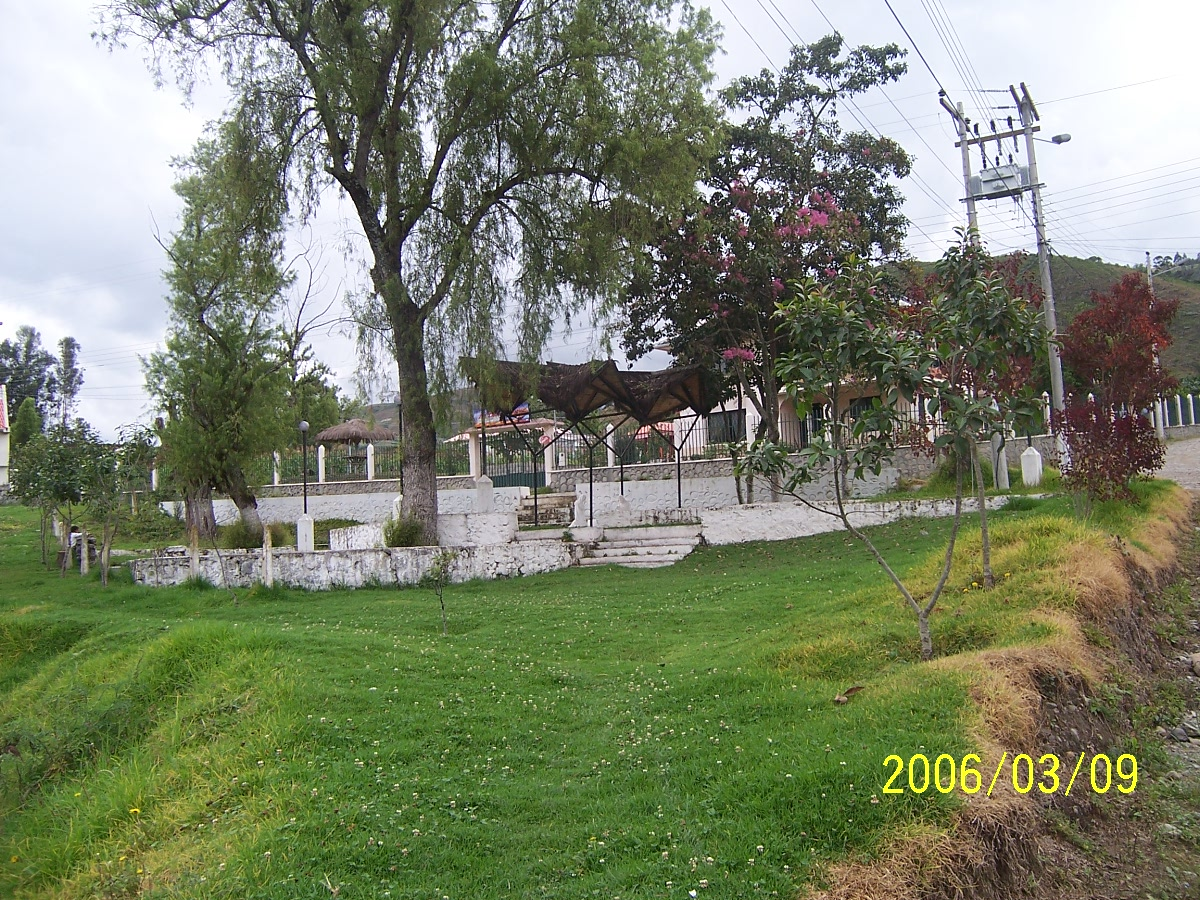
Gualaceo riverfront

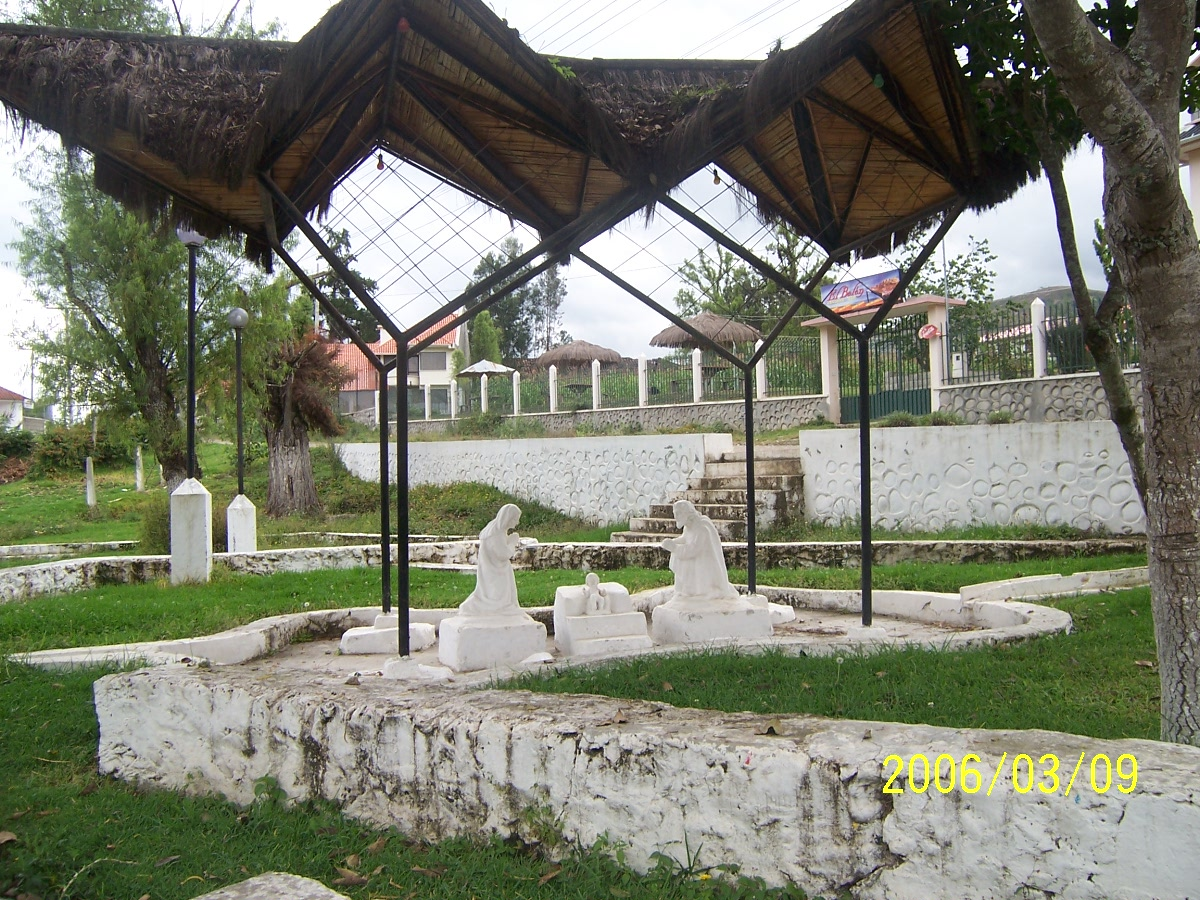
Gualaceo riverfront

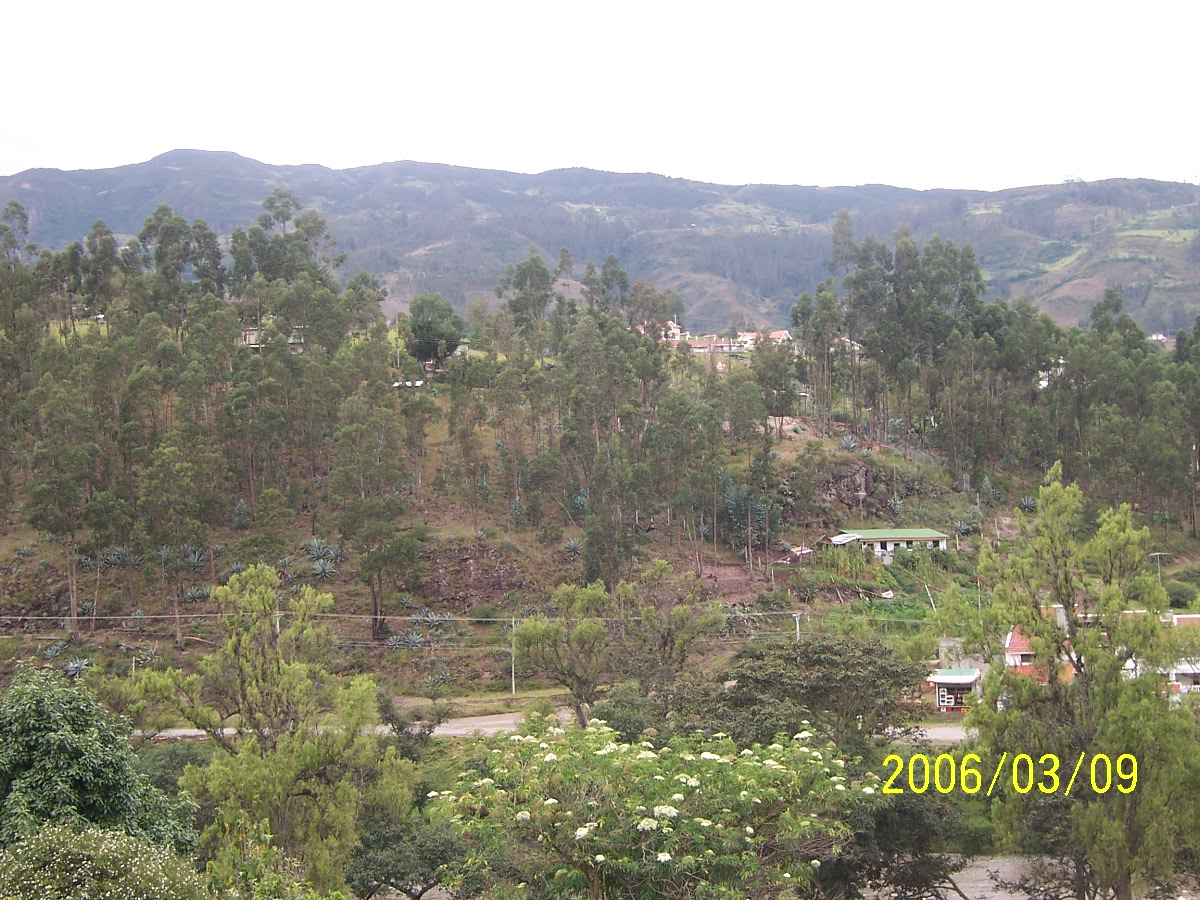
Gualaceo riverfront

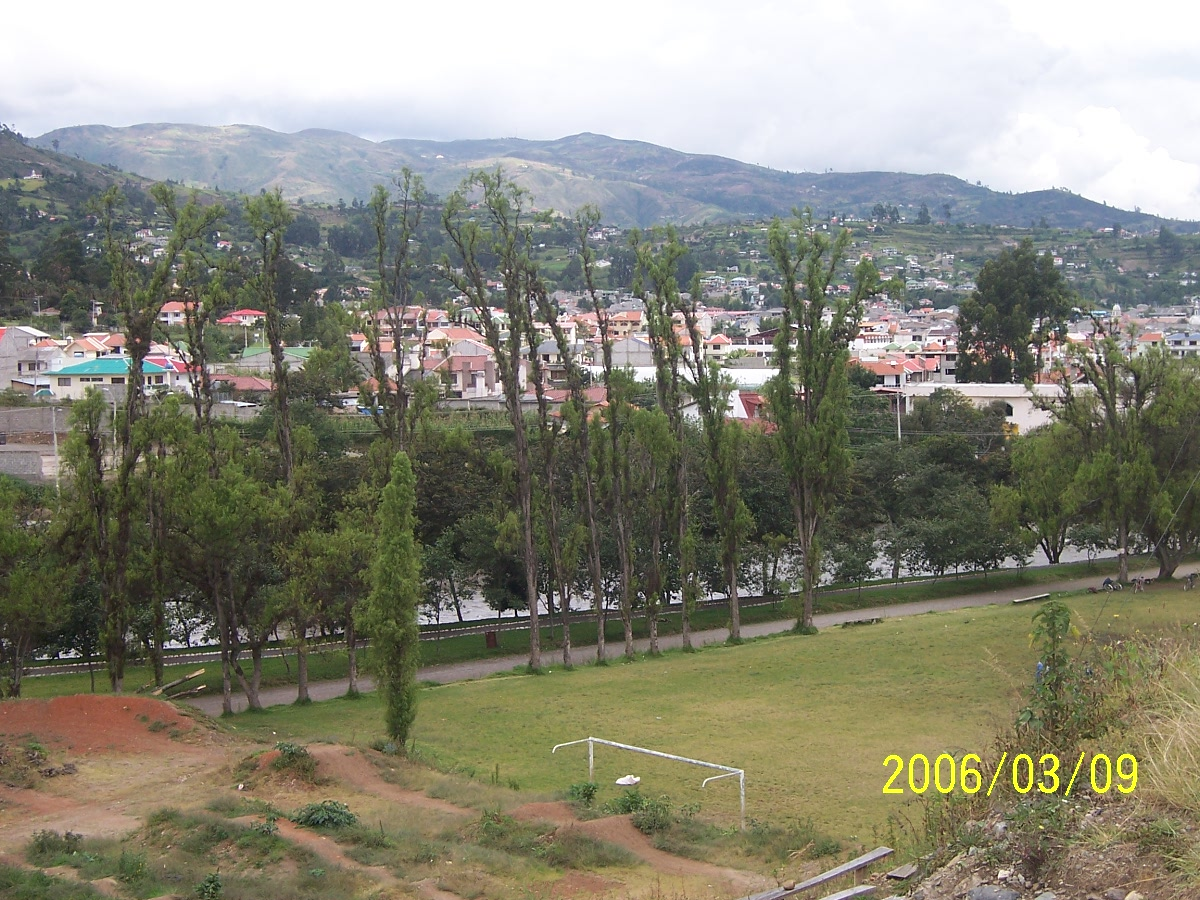
Gualaceo riverfront
