= Juan Zubeldía =

Argentine footballer and manager

Personal information
- Full name: Juan Manuel Zubeldía
- Date of birth: 19 August 1979 (age 47)
- Place of birth: Santa Rosa, Argentina
- Position: Midfielder

Youth career
- Racing Club

Senior career*
Years	Team	Apps	(Gls)
1999–2001	Racing Club	7	(1)
2001–2002	Huracán de Tres Arroyos	7	(0)
2002–2003	Villa Mitre	15	(0)
2004	Candelaria	0	(0)
2006–2010	Ferro Carril Oeste		
Total		29	(1)

Managerial career
- 2010–2012: Lanús (assistant)
- 2012–2013: Argentinos Juniors (assistant)
- 2014–2015: Crucero del Norte (assistant)
- 2015: Gimnasia Jujuy (assistant)
- 2015–2016: General Belgrano
- 2017: Deportivo Cuenca (assistant)
- 2018: Independiente del Valle (assistant)
- 2019: Aucas (assistant)
- 2020: Blooming (assistant)
- 2021: Mitre (SdE) (assistant)
- 2022: Deportivo Cuenca (assistant)
- 2023: Deportivo Cuenca
- 2024–2025: Leones
- 2025–2026: Delfín
- * Club domestic league appearances and goals

Juan Manuel Zubeldía (born 19 August 1979) is an Argentine football manager and former player who played as a midfielder.

== Playing career ==
Zubeldía was born in Santa Rosa, La Pampa, and made his senior debut with Racing Club on 16 June 1999, scoring in a match against Newell's Old Boys. After featuring rarely, he moved to Huracán de Tres Arroyos in 2001.

Zubeldía subsequently joined Villa Mitre in 2002, but played sparingly. In 2004, after rejecting offers from Italian clubs, he signed for Candelaria, but suffered an injury and the club terminated his contract.

Zubeldía also played for Ferro Carril Oeste between 2006 and 2010, retiring with the club at the age of 31.

== Managerial career ==
After retiring, Medina joined Gabriel Schürrer's staff at Lanús, as his assistant. He continued to work with Schürrer in the following years, at Argentinos Juniors, Crucero del Norte and Gimnasia y Esgrima de Jujuy.

In December 2015, Zubeldía was named manager of General Belgrano de Santa Rosa, but resigned the following 27 September. He then rejoined Schürrer's staff at Deportivo Cuenca, later working with the manager at Independiente del Valle, Aucas, Blooming, Mitre (SdE) and back at Cuenca.

On 12 December 2022, Zubeldía was named manager of Cuenca for the 2023 season, with compatriot Gabriel del Valle who was also an assistant of Schürrer. The duo left Cuenca on a mutual agreement on 3 May 2023.

Zubeldía subsequently worked as a match analyst at Greek side Panetolikos, before returning to Ecuador with Leones del Norte in June 2024. He left the club (now named Leones FC) in September 2025, and took over Delfín on 21 November of that year.

On 30 May 2026, Zubeldía resigned from Delfín.

== Personal life ==
Zubeldía's brothers Gustavo and Luis are also involved in football: the former worked with Luis at Lanús as a fitness coach, later working under the same capacity at several clubs, and the latter was also a footballer and a midfielder, later becoming a manager.
