= Estadio COAC Mushuc Runa =

Football stadium in Ambato, Ecuador

- Estadio Echaleche
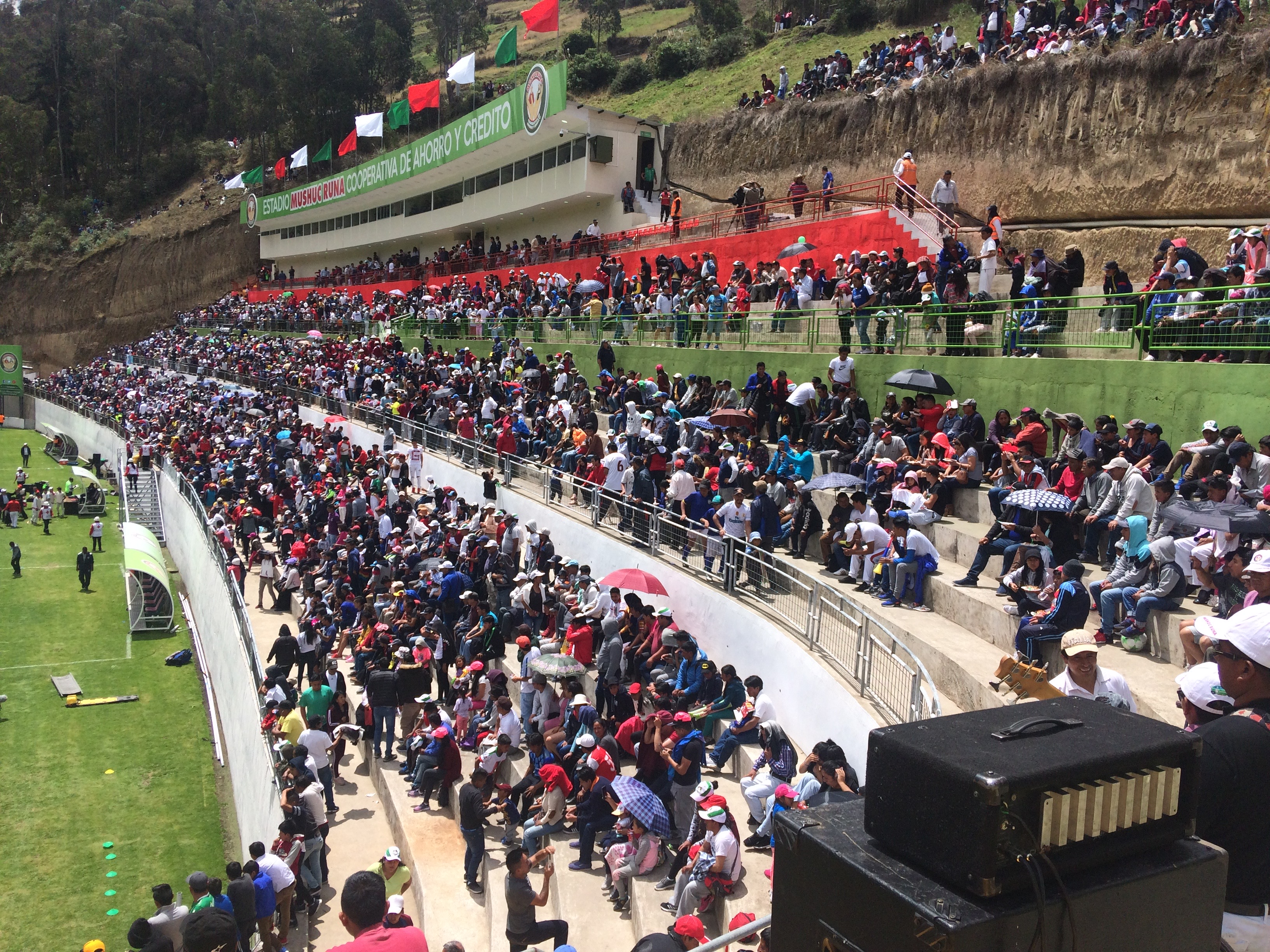
- Interactive map of Estadio COAC Mushuc Runa
- Full name: Estadio Cooperativa de Ahorro y Crédito Mushuc Runa
- Location: Ambato, Ecuador
- Coordinates: 1°18′32″S 78°43′40″W
- Owner: Mushuc Runa
- Operator: Mushuc Runa
- Capacity: 8,200
- Surface: Grass

Construction
- Groundbreaking: 2012
- Built: 2018
- Opened: 17 November 2018; 7 years ago

Tenant
- Mushuc Runa

Estadio Cooperativa de Ahorro y Crédito Mushuc Runa, known as Estadio COAC Mushuc Runa, is a football stadium in Ambato, Ecuador. The stadium is currently used at the club level by its owner Mushuc Runa, and has a capacity of 8,200 spectators.

== History ==
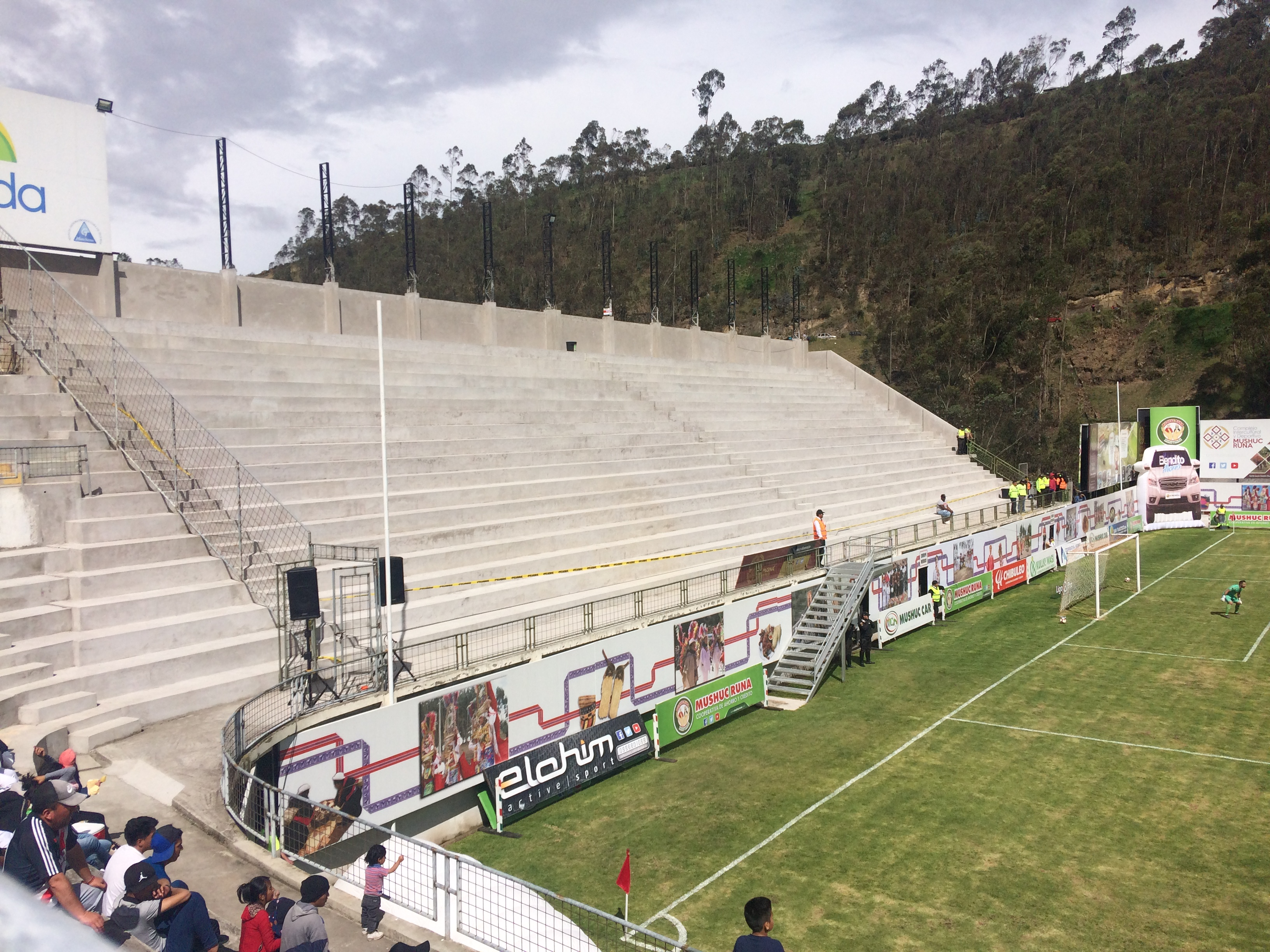
The stadium in 2019

After Mushuc Runa's promotion from Segunda Categoría in 2011, the club started to prepare the grounds for a new stadium in March 2012. The stadium was completed in late 2018, and had its inauguration on 17 November of that year, as Mushuc Runa beat Orense 3–0 in the Serie B.
