= Geovanny Cumbicus =

Ecuadorian footballer and manager (born 1980)

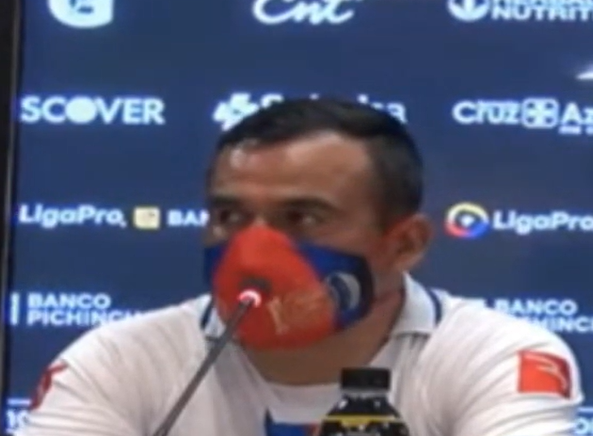
- Cumbicus in 2020

Personal information
- Full name: Geovanny Patricio Cumbicus Castillo
- Date of birth: 25 January 1980 (age 46)
- Place of birth: Loja, Ecuador
- Position: Centre-back

Youth career
- LDU Quito

Senior career*
Years	Team	Apps	(Gls)
1998–2004	LDU Quito	63	(0)
2004–2007	LDU Loja	111	(1)
2008	Aucas	27	(2)
2009–2014	LDU Loja	116	(7)

Managerial career
- 2015: LDU Loja (assistant)
- 2015–2017: LDU Loja
- 2018–2019: Mushuc Runa
- 2020: Olmedo
- 2021–2023: Mushuc Runa
- 2023–2024: Libertad FC
- 2024: Gualaceo
- 2025: Técnico Universitario
- * Club domestic league appearances and goals

Geovanny Patricio Cumbicus Castillo (born 25 January 1980) is an Ecuadorian professional football manager and former player who played as a central defender.

== Playing career ==
Cumbicus was born in Loja, but made his senior debut with LDU Quito in 1999. He moved to hometown side LDU Loja in the middle of 2004, and established himself as a starter for the club.

Cumbicus joined Aucas for the 2008 season, but returned to Liga de Loja in 2009. He struggled with injuries in the 2013 and 2014 campaigns, being also an interim assistant manager in the 2013 campaign.

Cumbicus retired from football on 18 December 2014, aged 34.

== Managerial career ==
Shortly after retiring, Cumbicus was named Julio César Toresani's assistant at his last club LDU Loja. In June 2015, he was named manager after Toresani resigned.

Cumbicus left Liga de Loja in late 2017, and was appointed in charge of Mushuc Runa for the 2018 season. He won the 2018 Serie B with the club, but was sacked on 28 May 2019.

Cumbicus agreed to a deal with Pelileo to become their manager for the 2020 campaign, but the club withdrew from the second division due to economic problems caused by the COVID-19 pandemic. He was named at the helm of Olmedo on 18 June 2020, and helped the club to narrowly avoid relegation.

Cumbicus left Olmedo as his contract expired, and returned to Mushuc Runa on 24 December 2020. On 16 November 2022, it was announced that he was leaving the club, but he agreed to a new contract for the 2023 season on 15 December. He was sacked nonetheless on 30 May 2023, and took over top tier newcomers Libertad FC on 18 August.

On 19 April 2024, Cumbicus was sacked from Libertad. He then spent a short period in charge of Gualaceo before being named Técnico Universitario manager on 25 June 2025.

On 11 November 2025, Cumbicus left Técnico Universitario by mutual consent.

== Honours ==
=== Player ===
LDU Quito

- Ecuadorian Serie A: 1999

=== Manager ===
Mushuc Runa

- Ecuadorian Serie B: 2018
