= Iván Vázquez (football manager) =

Spanish football manager

Personal information
- Full name: Iván Vázquez Rodríguez
- Date of birth: 28 July 1988 (age 38)
- Place of birth: Santiago de Compostela, Spain

Team information
- Current team: Olimpia (youth)

Managerial career
- Years: Team
- 2010–2013: Compostela (youth)
- 2013–2015: Cacheiras
- 2015–2018: Deportivo La Coruña (youth)
- 2018: Racing Ferrol (youth)
- 2019–2021: Independiente del Valle (youth)
- 2021: Atlético Santo Domingo
- 2022: Técnico Universitario
- 2023–: Olimpia (youth)

Iván Vázquez Rodríguez (born 28 July 1988) is a Spanish football manager, currently in charge of Paraguayan club Olimpia's youth categories.

== Career ==
Born in Santiago de Compostela, A Coruña, Galicia, Vázquez began his career with hometown side SD Compostela, as a youth manager and youth coordinator, and was also a first team manager at lowly locals SD Cacheiras. In 2015, he moved to Deportivo de La Coruña, as a coordinator of the Technification area and also a youth manager.

On 31 July 2018, Vázquez was named manager of the Cadete side of Racing de Ferrol. He left the side on 21 December, and moved abroad on 1 February 2019, after being named manager of the under-16 side of Ecuadorian side Independiente del Valle.

Vázquez was in charge of del Valle's under-20 side which won the 2020 U-20 Copa Libertadores, and left the side in April 2021 to take over Serie B side Atlético Santo Domingo. He left the latter club on 20 October, after avoiding relegation.

On 7 June 2022, Vázquez replaced Juan Urquiza at the helm of Serie A side Técnico Universitario. On 13 August, however, he was removed from the role.

== Honours ==
Independiente del Valle U20

- U-20 Copa Libertadores: 2020
