= Gualaceo =

- City
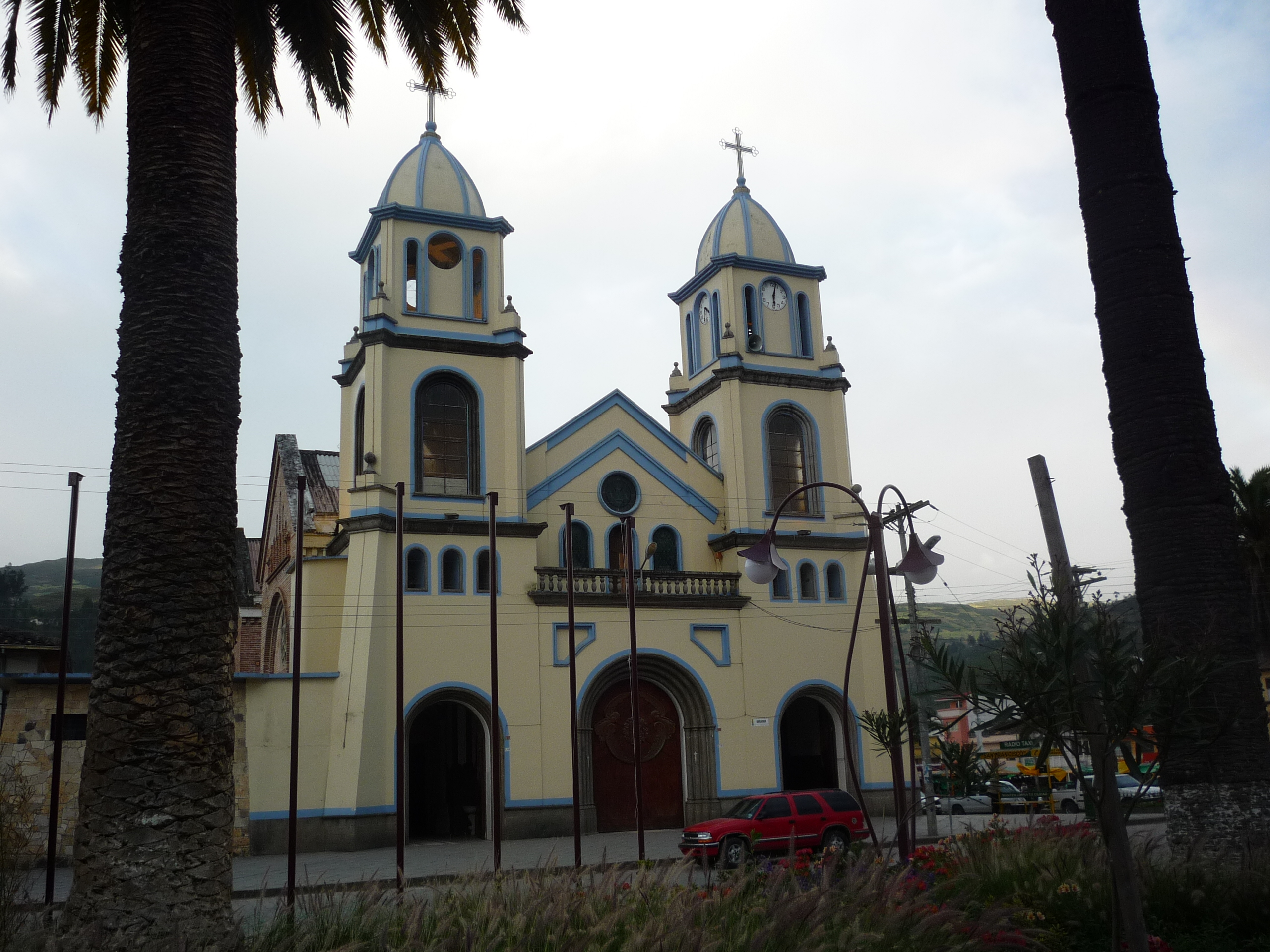
- Gualaceo's Main Church

- Flag
- Motto: Justo Y Fuerte
- Location within Ecuador
- Coordinates: 2.8864°S 78.7760°W
- Country: Ecuador
- Province: Azuay
- Canton: Gualaceo
- Parish: Gualaceo
- Settled: 1534

Government
  - Mayor: Marco Tapia

Area
  - City: 5.46 km^{2} (2.11 sq mi)
- Elevation: 2,330 m (7,640 ft)

Population (2022 census)
  - City: 13,843
  - Density: 2,540/km^{2} (6,570/sq mi)
- Time zone: UTC-5 (GMT-5:00 (Quito, Bogota, Lima))
- Website: www.gualaceo.gob.ec

Gualaceo, nicknamed “El Jardin del Azuay” (The Garden of Azuay), is a city in the Azuay Province of Ecuador and the capital of the eponymous Gualaceo Canton. It is located 35 km east from the city of Cuenca and is one of the biggest cities in Azuay.

Gualaceo is located in the Sierra Region of Ecuador, nestled in the Santa Bárbara valley in the Hoya de Paute, at an altitude of 2,330 meters above sea level. and an Andean valley climate of 17 degrees average. It is crossed by four rivers that are part of the Santiago hydrographic demarcation: San Francisco, Santa Bárbara, Guaymincay and San José. It is nicknamed "Jardín del Azuay" for its natural landscapes and the diversity of flora.

== History ==
=== Pre-inca period ===
What is now Gualaceo was a stately center that was part of the Cañari Hatun Cañar - Shabalula diarchy.

=== Conquest of Gualaceo ===
The Cañari cacique Llivicura guided the Spaniards Sebastián de Benalcázar, Francisco Hernández Girón, Hernando de la Parra and Falconí de la Cerda through the slopes of Cristo Rey and Dotaxí to Gualaceo, in the then Governorate of Nueva Castilla. In April 1534, on the banks of the river that they baptized as Santa Bárbola, the old name of the Santa Bárbara River, they established a mining camp.

=== Virreinal period ===
From 1547, the bachelor Gómez de Tapia served as chaplain to the miners of this settlement, replacing the priest Alonso Pablos. In that same year, Antonio de la Gama was appointed Governor and Judge of indigenous people.

In the year 1557, Don Gil Ramírez Dávalos arrived at the mining town of Santa Ana de los Ríos on the banks of the Santa Bárbara (today Gualaceo) with the order, from Viceroy Andrés Hurtado de Mendoza, to found a new city. Captain Rodrigo Núñez de Bonilla, Gil Ramírez Dávalos, the parish priest Gómez de Tapia, Fray Tomás Calvo and 19 residents left Santa Ana de los Ríos towards the Paucarbamba valley, guided by chief Llivicura, to found the city of Cuenca. Also from 12 April 1557, Father Gómez de Tapia also served the new Spanish city.

After the founding of Cuenca, the mining settlement on the banks of the Santa Bárbara lost the name of "Santa Ana de los Ríos" and in its place, a Cañari denomination arose.

== Climate ==
Climate data for Gualaceo/Paute, elevation 2,280 m (7,480 ft), (1961–1990)
Month	Jan	Feb	Mar	Apr	May	Jun	Jul	Aug	Sep	Oct	Nov	Dec	Year
Mean daily maximum °C (°F)	24.3 (75.7)	24.3 (75.7)	24.2 (75.6)	24.0 (75.2)	24.0 (75.2)	23.3 (73.9)	22.6 (72.7)	22.7 (72.9)	23.0 (73.4)	24.1 (75.4)	24.7 (76.5)	24.8 (76.6)	23.8 (74.9)
Daily mean °C (°F)	17.7 (63.9)	17.7 (63.9)	17.6 (63.7)	17.5 (63.5)	17.3 (63.1)	16.7 (62.1)	16.1 (61.0)	16.2 (61.2)	16.6 (61.9)	17.5 (63.5)	17.8 (64.0)	17.8 (64.0)	17.2 (63.0)
Mean daily minimum °C (°F)	11.1 (52.0)	11.1 (52.0)	11.1 (52.0)	11.1 (52.0)	11.0 (51.8)	10.5 (50.9)	10.0 (50.0)	10.0 (50.0)	10.3 (50.5)	10.6 (51.1)	10.6 (51.1)	11.0 (51.8)	10.7 (51.3)
Average precipitation mm (inches)	48.0 (1.89)	63.0 (2.48)	88.0 (3.46)	85.0 (3.35)	48.0 (1.89)	61.0 (2.40)	49.0 (1.93)	38.0 (1.50)	50.0 (1.97)	65.0 (2.56)	71.0 (2.80)	62.0 (2.44)	728 (28.67)
Source: FAO
