= Gualaceo S.C. =

Association football club in Ecuador

Gualaceo
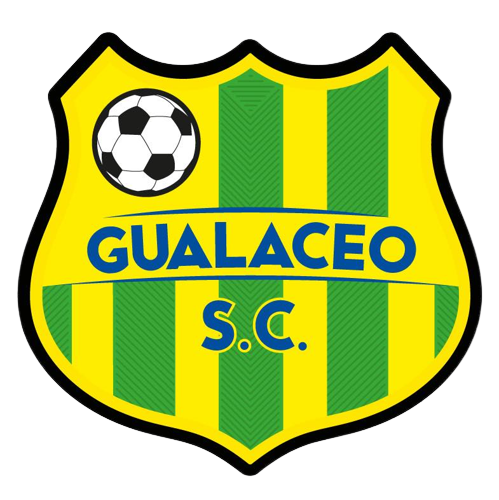
- Full name: Gualaceo Sporting Club
- Nicknames: El Guala; Los Auriverdes; El Equipo del Jardín Azuayo; Verdeamarelos; Súper Guala; El Idolo del Jardín Azuayo
- Founded: 2 April 2000; 25 years ago
- Ground: Gerardo León Pozo
- Capacity: 2,791
- Chairman: Klever León
- Manager: Cipriano Valentím
- League: Ecuadorian Serie B
- 2024: Serie B, 6th of 10
Home colours	Away colours	Third colours

Gualaceo Sporting Club is an Ecuadorian professional football club from the city of Gualaceo. Founded on 2 April 2000, they play in the Serie B.

== History ==
Founded on 2 April 2000, the club first reached the Segunda Categoría in 2005 after finishing second in the Segunda Categoría del Azuay, but were knocked out in the first stage. After again reaching only the first stage in 2009, the club reached the final phase of the tournament in 2010, finishing fourth.

Guadalceo won two consecutive regional tournaments in 2011 and 2012, but again failed to achieve promotion in the national division. After only playing in the regional division in 2013, the club again reached the Segunda Categoría in 2014, where they achieved promotion to the Serie B as champions.

After a seventh place finish in their first year in the second division, Gualaceo finished third in 2016, only two points shy of second-placed Clan Juvenil. After another seventh place in 2017, the club finished eleventh in 2018, but did not suffer relegation after the number of teams in the first division increased and the relegation in both first and second divisions were declared void.

After a third and sixth position finish in 2019 and 2020, respectively, Guadalceo achieved a first-ever promotion to the Serie A on 13 October 2021, after a 1–0 home win over Atlético Santo Domingo and El Nacional's draw with Independiente Juniors.

== Achievements ==
- Serie B
  - Runners-up (1): 2021
- Segunda Categoría
  - Winners (1): 2014

== Players ==
=== Current squad ===
As of 6 April 2025.

Note: Flags indicate national team as defined under FIFA eligibility rules; some limited exceptions apply. Players may hold more than one non-FIFA nationality.

No.	Pos.	Nation	Player
1	GK	ECU	Alexi Lemos
3	DF	ECU	Gilson Hurtado
4	DF	ECU	Garis Mina
5	MF	ECU	Wílmer Godoy (Captain)
6	DF	ECU	Michael Obando
7	MF	ECU	Kevin Caicedo
8	MF	ECU	Silvano Estacio
9	FW	URU	Brian Cordara
10	FW	ECU	Jesús Preciado
11	FW	ECU	Denilson Ovando
12	GK	ECU	Denzel Quiñónez
14	MF	ECU	Carlos Alvarado
15	DF	ECU	Roddy Salazar
16	DF	ECU	Hanssel Delgado
17	DF	ECU	Geancarlos Zumba

No.	Pos.	Nation	Player
18	MF	ECU	Jorge Góngora
21	DF	ECU	Byron Mina
23	DF	ECU	Yeison Nazareno
27	DF	ECU	Byron Torrez
32	FW	ARG	Tobias Donsanti
70	MF	ECU	Mateos Tello
80	MF	ECU	Kevin Arroyo
88	FW	ECU	Diogo Wila
99	FW	ECU	Jacson Pita
-	GK	ECU	Alexander Eras
-	DF	VEN	Jean Fran Gutiérrez
-	DF	COL	José López
-	MF	ECU	Jandry Bravo
-	MF	ECU	Robert Solorzano
-	MF	ECU	Juan Puentes
