= Mushuc Runa =

Ecuadorian football club

- Full name: Mushuc Runa Sporting Club
- Nicknames: El equipo cooperativista El Mushuc; El Ponchito
- Founded: 2 January 2003; 23 years ago
- Ground: COAC Mushuc Runa; Ambato, Ecuador
- Capacity: 6,000
- Chairman: Gabriel Pilamunga
- Manager: Paúl Vélez
- League: Ecuadorian Serie A
- 2025: First stage: 15th of 16; Relegation group: 2nd of 4
- Website: www.mushucrunasc.ec
| Home colours | Away colours | Third colours |

Mushuc Runa Sporting Club, commonly known as Mushuc Runa, is an Ecuadorian professional football club based in Ambato. It was founded on 2 January 2003. They currently play in the Ecuadorian Serie A. The name comes from the Quechuan: "Mushuc" means new, and "Runa" means man, person, or human being; therefore, the literal translation is "New Man".

== Honours ==
- Serie B
  - Winners (1): 2018
  - Runners-up (1): 2013
- Segunda Categoría
  - Runners-up (1): 2011

== Current squad ==
As of 12 March 2025

Note: Flags indicate national team as defined under FIFA eligibility rules; some limited exceptions apply. Players may hold more than one non-FIFA nationality.

| No. | Pos. | Nation | Player |
|---|---|---|---|
| 2 | DF | ECU | Jose Flor |
| 5 | MF | ECU | Nicolás Davila |
| 7 | MF | ECU | Tomson Minda |
| 8 | MF | ECU | Arnaldo Zambrano |
| 10 | MF | ECU | Freddy Mina |
| 11 | FW | URU | Nicolás Dibble |
| 12 | DF | ECU | Franklin Carabalí |
| 14 | FW | ECU | Elian Caicedo |
| 18 | MF | ECU | Jackson Gonzalez |
| 19 | MF | ECU | Jamilton Carcelen |
| 23 | DF | URU | Lucas Lemos |

| No. | Pos. | Nation | Player |
|---|---|---|---|
| 25 | GK | URU | Rodrigo Formento |
| 26 | DF | ECU | Kevin Peralta |
| 32 | FW | ECU | Carlos Orejuela |
| 33 | DF | ECU | Jose Hernandez |
| 37 | DF | ECU | José Luis Quiñones |
| 42 | GK | ECU | Adonnis Pabón |
| 44 | DF | PAN | Manuel Gamboa |
| 50 | DF | ECU | Jeremy Cusme |
| 77 | MF | ECU | Elvis Velasco |
| 81 | FW | ARG | Facundo Castelli |
| 99 | MF | ECU | Cristopher Angulo |

== Managers ==
- (Argentina) César Vigevani (13 December 2012 - 1 April 2014)
- (Ecuador) Fabián Burbano (interim) (1 April 2014 - 6 April 2014)
- (Argentina) Julio Asad (4 April 2014 - 30 March 2015)
- (Ecuador) Sixto Vizuete (31 March 2015 - 13 December 2015)
- (Ecuador) Humberto Pizarro (15 December 2015 - 16 April 2016)
- (Argentina) Néstor Clausen (16 April 2016 - 7 July 2016)
- (Argentina) Víctor Hugo Andrada (20 July 2016 - 31 October2016)
- (Ecuador) Luis Espinel (30 December 2016 - 11 June 2017)
- (Ecuador) Juan Carlos Garay (11 June 2017 - 6 November 2017)
- (Ecuador) Hector Chacha (interim) (7 November 2017 - 19 December 2017)
- (Ecuador) Geovanny Cumbicus (19 December 2017 - 29 May 2019)
- (Argentina) Martín Cardetti (31 May 2019 - 11 November 2019)
- (Argentina) Ricardo Dillon (12 November 2019 - 19 December 2020)
- (Ecuador) Geovanny Cumbicus (24 December 2020 - 27 May 2021)
