= 2026 Supercopa Ecuador =

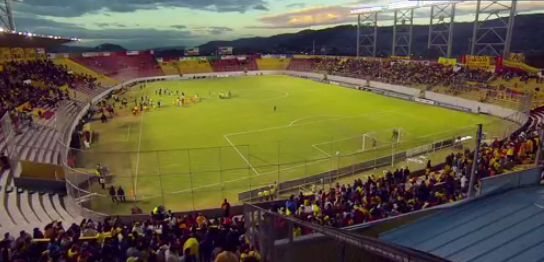
- Estadio Gonzalo Pozo Ripalda in Quito hosted the match.
Universidad Católica	Independiente del Valle
0	3
- Date: 13 May 2026
- Venue: Estadio Gonzalo Pozo Ripalda, Quito
- Referee: Oswaldo Contreras

The 2026 Supercopa Ecuador, known as the 2026 Supercopa Ecuador Ecuabet DIRECTV for sponsorship purposes, was the fifth edition of the Supercopa Ecuador, Ecuador's football super cup, organized by the Ecuadorian Football Federation (FEF). It was held on 13 May 2026 between the 2025 Copa Ecuador champions Universidad Católica and the 2025 LigaPro Serie A champions Independiente del Valle at Estadio Gonzalo Pozo Ripalda in Quito.

Independiente del Valle defeated Universidad Católica 3–0 in this match to win their second Supercopa Ecuador title.

The Supercopa was originally planned to be played on 28 January 2026, prior to the start of the 2026 season, but it was postponed to a later time into the season to allow the participating teams to compete at a higher pace.

== Teams ==
The match was played by Independiente del Valle and Universidad Católica, champions of the LigaPro Serie A and the Copa Ecuador in the 2025 season. While this was Universidad Católica's debut in the competition after winning their first domestic title in the previous season, Independiente del Valle played the Supercopa Ecuador for the second time, having won the title in their previous appearance in 2023.

Team	Qualification	Previous appearances (bold indicates winners)
Independiente del Valle	2025 LigaPro Serie A champions	1 (**2023**)
Universidad Católica	2025 Copa Ecuador champions	None

== Details ==
13 May 2026
17:00 UTC−5

Universidad Católica	0–3	Independiente del Valle
	Report	Sornoza 24'; Carabajal 30'; Briones 90+2'

Estadio Gonzalo Pozo Ripalda, Quito
Referee: Oswaldo Contreras

**Universidad Católica**	**Independiente del Valle**

GK	22	(Venezuela) Rafael Romo
RB	29	(Ecuador) Gregori Anangonó	(yellow card) 27'
CB	33	(Ecuador) Luis Cangá
CB	4	(Venezuela) Jhon Chancellor
LB	44	(Ecuador) Eric Valencia	(yellow card) 50'	(substituted off) 55'
DCM	5	(Argentina) Jerónimo Cacciabue	(yellow card) 34'	(substituted off) 66'
RM	30	(Ecuador) Eddy Mejía
CM	28	(Argentina) Mauro Díaz
CM	8	(Ecuador) Daniel Clavijo (c)	(yellow card) 44'	(substituted off) 82'
LM	32	(Uruguay) Mauricio Alonso	(yellow card) 41'	(substituted off) 82'
CF	7	(Panama) José Fajardo	(yellow card) 29'	(substituted off) 66'
Substitutes:
GK	1	(Ecuador) Lucas Cueva
GK	12	(Ecuador) Johan Lara
DF	19	(Ecuador) Marcos Sevillano
DF	24	(Ecuador) Darwin Nazareno
DF	37	(Ecuador) Carlos Medina
MF	10	(Argentina) Facundo Martínez		(substituted on) 82'
MF	15	(Ecuador) Luis Moreno
MF	23	(Ecuador) Álex Rodríguez		(substituted on) 66'
MF	26	(Ecuador) Saenddy Yánez
FW	9	(Panama) Azarias Londoño		(substituted on) 82'
FW	13	(Panama) Everardo Rose		(substituted on) 66'
FW	18	(Ecuador) Byron Palacios		(substituted on) 55'
Manager:
(Ecuador) Diego Martínez

GK	1	(Colombia) Aldair Quintana
RB	13	(Ecuador) Daykol Romero	(yellow card) 19'
CB	6	(Ecuador) Jordy Alcívar
CB	23	(Uruguay) Juan Viacava
LB	14	(Argentina) Mateo Carabajal
DCM	19	(Ecuador) Layan Loor
RM	17	(Ecuador) Arón Rodríguez		(substituted off) 84'
CM	53	(Ecuador) Justin Lerma		(substituted off) 84'
CM	10	(Ecuador) Júnior Sornoza (c)		(substituted off) 66'
LM	31	(Ecuador) Emerson Pata		(substituted off) 76'
CF	9	(Paraguay) Carlos González		(substituted off) 84'
Substitutes:
GK	12	(Ecuador) Eduardo Bores
DF	4	(Ecuador) Jhon Espinoza
DF	15	(Ecuador) Gustavo Cortez
DF	20	(Ecuador) Aníbal Gómez
DF	33	(Ecuador) Andy Velasco		(substituted on) 84'
MF	8	(Ecuador) Youri Ochoa
MF	16	(Ecuador) Ronald Briones	(red card) 90+4'	(substituted on) 66'
MF	32	(Ecuador) Jhegson Méndez		(substituted on) 84'
MF	55	(Ecuador) Darwin Guagua
FW	11	(Argentina) Matías Perelló		(substituted on) 76'
FW	50	(Ecuador) Juan Angulo		(substituted on) 84'
FW	99	(Ecuador) Djorkaeff Reasco
Manager:
(Uruguay) Joaquín Papa

Assistant referees:
Andrés Tola
Ricardo Valdiviezo
Fourth official:
Franklin Congo
Video assistant referee:
Roddy Zambrano
Assistant video assistant referee:
Christian Lescano

**Match rules**

- 90 minutes.
- Penalty shoot-out if scores still level.
- Twelve named substitutes.
- Maximum of five substitutions, with an additional substitution enabled for both teams in the event of a concussion.
