= Jeremiah (disambiguation) =

Jeremiah is one of the major prophets of the Hebrew Bible.

Jeremiah may also refer to:

- Book of Jeremiah, in Judeo-Christian scripture
- Jeremiah in the Book of Mormon

== People ==
- Jeremiah (given name)
- Jeremiah (surname)
- Jeremiah (I), a first-generation Amora sage of the Land of Israel
- Jeremiah (II), a third-generation Amora sage of the Land of Israel
- Jeremiah (III), a fourth-generation Amora sage of the Land of Israel
- Jeremiah (Bulgarian priest), late 10th-century priest

== Arts and entertainment ==
- Jeremiah (film), a 1998 Biblical film
- Jeremiah (play) (1919), by Stefan Zweig
- Jeremiah (comics), a Belgian series since 1979
- Jeremiah (TV series) (2002–2004), an American show loosely based on the comic series
- Symphony No. 1 (Bernstein), composed in 1942 by Leonard Bernstein
- "Jeremiah", a song by Sara Groves from the 2004 album The Other Side of Something

== Other uses ==
- Jeremiah, Kentucky, United States, an unincorporated community
- Old Jeremiah, an antique British naval gun

== See also ==
- Geremia
- Jeremih (born 1987), American singer, songwriter, rapper and record producer
- Jeremias (disambiguation)
