= Gulich =

Gulich or Gülich may refer to:

== Places ==
- Gulich Township, Clearfield County, Pennsylvania
- Jülich, a town in Germany, also known as Gülich

== People ==
- Jeremias Friedrich Gülich (1733–1808), German dyer
- John Percival Gülich (1864–1898), British artist
- Marie Gülich (born 1994), German basketball player
- Wilhelm Gülich (1895–1960), German politician
- Thomas Gulich (1961), Swiss manager
