= 2025 Copa Ecuador =

Copa Ecuador Ecuabet DirecTV 2025

Tournament details
- Country: Ecuador
- Dates: 30 April – 18 December 2025
- Teams: 49

Final positions
- Champions: Universidad Católica (1st title)
- Runners-up: LDU Quito
- Copa Libertadores: Universidad Católica

Tournament statistics
- Matches played: 50
- Goals scored: 120 (2.4 per match)

The 2025 Copa Ecuador (officially known as the Copa Ecuador Ecuabet DirecTV 2025 for sponsorship purposes) was the fifth edition of the Copa Ecuador, Ecuador's domestic football cup. It began on 30 April 2025 and ended on 18 December 2025.

Universidad Católica were the champions, winning their first title in the competition after defeating LDU Quito 3–2 in the final. By winning the tournament, Universidad Católica qualified for the 2026 Copa Libertadores first stage as well as the 2026 Supercopa Ecuador.

El Nacional were the defending champions, having won the previous edition of the competition in 2024, but were eliminated by 9 de Octubre in the round of 16.

== Format ==
For this season, the competition kept the single knockout tournament used in the previous edition. A qualifying match was played by one Segunda Categoría team and an amateur one, with the winners advancing to the first stage of the competition, in which 10 Ecuadorian Serie B teams, the remaining Segunda Categoría ones and the amateur champions entered the competition. For this round, the involved clubs were drawn into 16 single-match ties, with the winners advancing to the second stage.

The 16 Ecuadorian Serie A teams joined the competition in the second stage, comprising the round of 32, round of 16, quarter-finals and semi-finals, with the final match played between the two semifinal winners being the third and final stage of the competition. All rounds in the competition except for the semi-finals were played over a single leg, which were hosted by the team from the lower tier or the worst placed team in the season's aggregate table if both teams were from the same league. The semi-finals were played over two legs, whilst the final was played on neutral ground.

== Prizes ==
The champions of this edition qualified for the 2026 Copa Libertadores, taking the Ecuador 4 berth in that competition, as well as the 2026 Supercopa Ecuador against the 2025 Ecuadorian Serie A champions. Monetary prizes were also granted for this edition, with the champions being awarded US$260,000 and the runners-up receiving US$120,000. The four semifinalists were awarded up to US$80,000, the quarter-finalists received up to US$50,000, whilst teams eliminated in the round of 16, round of 32, first round and qualifying stage earned up to US$30,000, US$20,000, US$10,000 and US$5,000, respectively.

== Schedule ==
Round	Draw date	Matches
Qualifying stage	16 April 2025	30 April 2025
First round	16 April 2025	9 May – 13 June 2025
Round of 32	13 June 2025	9 July – 28 August 2025
Round of 16	13 June 2025	10 September – 9 October 2025
Quarter-finals	13 June 2025	13 October – 12 November 2025
Semi-finals	13 June 2025	17–25 November 2025 (1st leg); 2–3 December 2025 (2nd leg)
Final	13 June 2025	18 December 2025 (Quito)

== Teams ==
49 clubs took part in this edition of the Copa Ecuador: 16 from the Serie A, 10 from the Serie B, 21 from the Segunda Categoría, and 2 amateur teams. Although Chacaritas and Vargas Torres were spared from relegation from Serie B despite ending in the bottom two places of the 2024 Serie B, they were not entered into the competition.

=== Serie A ===
- Aucas
- Barcelona
- Delfín
- Deportivo Cuenca
- El Nacional
- Emelec
- Independiente del Valle
- Libertad
- LDU Quito
- Macará
- Manta
- Mushuc Runa
- Orense
- Técnico Universitario
- Universidad Católica
- Vinotinto Ecuador

=== Serie B ===
- 9 de Octubre
- 22 de Julio
- Atlético Vinotinto
- Cumbayá
- Gualaceo
- Guayaquil City
- Imbabura
- Independiente Juniors
- Leones
- San Antonio

=== Segunda Categoría ===
- Baños Ciudad de Fuego
- Cuenca Juniors
- Deportivo Coca
- Deportivo Ibarra
- Deportivo Santo Domingo
- Ecuagenera
- Huaquillas
- La Cantera
- La Troncal
- LDU Portoviejo
- Liga de Macas
- Loja City (Note: Known as Sportivo Loja until 22 May 2025.)
- Luz Valdivia
- Miguel Iturralde
- Mineros
- Montúfar
- Olmedo
- Panamericana
- Patria
- Río Aguarico
- San Camilo

=== Amateur teams ===
- Quito
- Sembrando Buenos Campeones

== Qualifying stage ==
The qualifying stage was played as a single match between the worst placed team in the 2024 Segunda Categoría's general standings and the amateur league runner-up. The winner advanced to the first stage.

30 April 2025	Quito	0–2	Sportivo Loja	Tabacundo
15:00 UTC−5		Report	Mejía 24'; Cabrera 89'	Stadium: Liga Deportiva Cantonal de Tabacundo

== First round ==
- Teams entering this round: 10 teams from Serie B, 20 teams from Segunda Categoría, and 1 amateur team. The team from the lower tier hosted the match.

Team 1	Score	Team 2
San Camilo	0–0 (3–4 p)	Guayaquil City
Deportivo Coca	0–3	22 de Julio
Mineros	0–2	Gualaceo
Ecuagenera	2–1	Cumbayá
Cuenca Juniors	2–2 (5–4 p)	Atlético Vinotinto
La Troncal	1–2	Imbabura
Panamericana	0–1	9 de Octubre
Sembrando Buenos Campeones	0–4	Leones
LDU Portoviejo	1–1 (4–3 p)	Independiente Juniors
Olmedo	2–2 (5–3 p)	Liga de Macas
Luz Valdivia	1–1 (4–5 p)	Deportivo Santo Domingo
Baños Ciudad de Fuego	2–2 (4–3 p)	Huaquillas
Río Aguarico	2–1	Loja City
Patria	1–1 (1–3 p)	Miguel Iturralde
Montúfar	1–4	La Cantera
Deportivo Ibarra	0–0 (4–5 p)	San Antonio

== Bracket ==
Round of 32
Deportivo Santo Domingo (p)	2 (4)
Delfín	2 (1)
Guayaquil City	3
Mushuc Runa	1
Leones	1
Orense	0
Miguel Iturralde	1 (4)
Emelec (p)	1 (5)
San Antonio	1
Manta	0
Olmedo	1 (3)
LDU Quito (p)	1 (5)
Ecuagenera	0 (4)
Aucas (p)	0 (5)
Baños Ciudad de Fuego	0
Deportivo Cuenca	2
Gualaceo	2
Vinotinto Ecuador	1
Imbabura	0
Independiente del Valle	1
LDU Portoviejo (p)	0 (7)
Macará	0 (6)
Río Aguarico	0
Universidad Católica	1
Cuenca Juniors	2
Barcelona	0
La Cantera (p)	0 (2)
Libertad	0 (1)
9 de Octubre (p)	0 (5)
Técnico Universitario	0 (3)
22 de Julio	0
El Nacional	3

Round of 16
Deportivo Santo Domingo	2
Guayaquil City	3
Leones	0 (2)
Emelec (p)	0 (4)
San Antonio	0
LDU Quito	4
Aucas	1 (8)
Deportivo Cuenca (p)	1 (9)
Gualaceo	0
Independiente del Valle	6
LDU Portoviejo	1
Universidad Católica	3
Cuenca Juniors	6
La Cantera	1
9 de Octubre (p)	1 (5)
El Nacional	1 (3)

Quarter-finals
Guayaquil City	0 (0)
Emelec (p)	0 (2)
LDU Quito	2
Deportivo Cuenca	0
Independiente del Valle	1
Universidad Católica	2
Cuenca Juniors	2
9 de Octubre	1

Semi-finals
Emelec	1	1	2 (4)
LDU Quito (p)	2	0	2 (5)
Universidad Católica	4	0	4
Cuenca Juniors	1	0	1

Final
LDU Quito	2
Universidad Católica	3

== Round of 32 ==
- Teams entering this round: 16 teams from Serie A. The team from the lower tier hosted the match.

10 July 2025	Deportivo Santo Domingo	2–2 (4–1 p)	Delfín	Santo Domingo
18:00 UTC−5	Peñarrieta 2', 45+3'	Report	Fernández 11'; Pérez Tica 90'	Stadium: Etho Vega; Referee: Erik Ruiz
	Penalties
	Quiñónez (penalty scored); Villacrés (penalty scored); Arboleda (penalty scored); Ochoa (penalty scored)		(penalty missed) Castro; (penalty missed) Pérez Tica; (penalty scored) Cagua

11 July 2025	22 de Julio	0–3	El Nacional	Esmeraldas
15:30 UTC−5		Report	Reasco 23'; Pazmiño 70', 80'	Stadium: Folke Anderson; Referee: Patricio Parra

16 July 2025	La Cantera	0–0 (2–1 p)	Libertad	Baños
15:00 UTC−5		Report		Stadium: Coronel José Silva Romo; Referee: Kleber Aroca
	Penalties
	Camacho (penalty missed); Salazar (penalty scored); Mercado (penalty missed); Delgado (penalty missed); Monroy (penalty scored)		(penalty missed) Ayoví; (penalty missed) Á. Quiñónez; (penalty missed) D. Caicedo; (penalty scored) Bolaños; (penalty missed) García

16 July 2025	Olmedo	1–1 (3–5 p)	LDU Quito	Riobamba
19:00 UTC−5	Wittle 49'	Report	Pastrán 21'	Stadium: Olímpico Fernando Guerrero; Referee: Russell Terán
	Penalties
	Chicaiza (penalty missed); Meneses (penalty scored); Agüero (penalty scored); Wittle (penalty scored)		(penalty scored) Alzugaray; (penalty scored) Alvarado; (penalty scored) Cabeza; (penalty scored) Villamíl; (penalty scored) Quiñónez

23 July 2025	Río Aguarico	0–1	Universidad Católica	Shushufindi
15:00 UTC−5		Report	Anangonó 62' (pen.)	Stadium: Municipal; Referee: Rene Marín
Note: Match suspended at half-time due to heavy rain. After a failed attempt to resume the match the following day, the second half was rescheduled to 31 July 2025, 15:30 local time at Estadio Olímpico, Ibarra.

30 July 2025	Ecuagenera	0–0 (4–5 p)	Aucas	Gualaceo
15:00 UTC−5		Report		Stadium: Gerardo León Pozo; Referee: Kleber Aroca
	Penalties
	Perlaza (penalty scored); Landázuri (penalty missed); Ortiz (penalty scored); Angulo (penalty scored); Nazareno (penalty scored); García (penalty missed)		(penalty scored) Montenegro; (penalty scored) Jaramillo; (penalty scored) Carcelén; (penalty scored) J. Mina; (penalty missed) Segura; (penalty scored) Ontaneda

30 July 2025	Miguel Iturralde	1–1 (4–5 p)	Emelec	Quito
18:30 UTC−5	León 39' (o.g.)	Report	Bagüí 65'	Stadium: Olímpico Atahualpa; Referee: Henry Arízaga
	Penalties
	Morales (penalty scored); Vaca (penalty missed); Carabalí (penalty scored); Estupiñán (penalty scored); Guerrero (penalty scored); De la Torre (penalty missed)		(penalty scored) León; (penalty scored) Castelli; (penalty missed) Angulo; (penalty scored) Ruiz; (penalty scored) González; (penalty scored) Rodríguez

6 August 2025	Guayaquil City	3–1	Mushuc Runa	Guayaquil
16:30 UTC−5	Mero 29'; Palma 53'; Bolaños 90+4'	Report	Dos Santos 87'	Stadium: Christian Benítez Betancourt; Referee: Gabriel González

6 August 2025	Imbabura	0–1	Independiente del Valle	Ibarra
19:00 UTC−5		Report	Vásquez 34'	Stadium: Olímpico; Referee: Lenín Quiñónez

7 August 2025	Baños Ciudad de Fuego	0–2	Deportivo Cuenca	Baños
19:00 UTC−5		Report	Leguizamón 24'; Morocho 72'	Stadium: Coronel José Silva Romo; Referee: Eloy Beltrán

13 August 2025	San Antonio	1–0	Manta	Ibarra
15:00 UTC−5	Angulo 20' (o.g.)	Report		Stadium: Olímpico; Referee: Russell Terán

14 August 2025	Gualaceo	2–1	Vinotinto Ecuador	Gualaceo
15:30 UTC−5	Salazar 33'; Tello 83'	Report	Iriarte 14'	Stadium: Gerardo León Pozo; Referee: Yerson Zambrano

20 August 2025	9 de Octubre	0–0 (5–3 p)	Técnico Universitario	La Troncal
15:00 UTC−5		Report		Stadium: Municipal; Referee: Juan Carlos Andrade
	Penalties
	Celedón (penalty scored); Rivas (penalty scored); Mairongo (penalty scored); Chichande (penalty scored); González (penalty scored)		(penalty scored) Celis; (penalty scored) Perea; (penalty scored) Cuero; (penalty missed) Medranda

21 August 2025	Leones	1–0	Orense	Ibarra
19:00 UTC−5	Godoy 51'	Report		Stadium: Olímpico; Referee: Gorky Araujo

27 August 2025	LDU Portoviejo	0–0 (7–6 p)	Macará	Portoviejo
19:30 UTC−5		Report		Stadium: Reales Tamarindos; Referee: Guillermo Guerrero
	Penalties
	Espínola (penalty scored); Gómez (penalty scored); Proaño (penalty scored); Quintero (penalty scored); Perlaza (penalty missed); Cangá (penalty scored); J. González (penalty scored); Cifuente (penalty scored)		(penalty missed) Álvarez; (penalty scored) Arena; (penalty scored) Tello; (penalty scored) P. González; (penalty scored) Juambeltz; (penalty scored) Jiménez; (penalty scored) Caicedo; (penalty missed) Mohor

28 August 2025	Cuenca Juniors	2–0	Barcelona	Cuenca
19:00 UTC−5	Asagidigbi 59'; Ordóñez 63'	Report		Stadium: Alejandro Serrano Aguilar; Referee: Bryan Loayza

== Round of 16 ==
Matches in this round were played from 10 September to 9 October 2025.

10 September 2025	Aucas	1–1 (8–9 p)	Deportivo Cuenca	Quito
19:00 UTC−5	Segura 52'	Report	Morocho 38'	Stadium: Gonzalo Pozo Ripalda; Referee: Yerson Zambrano
	Penalties
	Carcelén (penalty scored); Miranda (penalty scored); Jaramillo (penalty scored); Ciccioli (penalty scored); Cano (penalty scored); J. Mina (penalty scored); A. Mina (penalty scored); Rolón (penalty scored); Reséndez (penalty missed)		(penalty scored) Ordóñez; (penalty scored) Noboa; (penalty scored) Arroyo; (penalty scored) Gómez; (penalty scored) Maccari; (penalty scored) Moreno; (penalty scored) Gustavino; (penalty scored) Piedra; (penalty scored) Raggio

18 September 2025	9 de Octubre	1–1 (5–3 p)	El Nacional	La Troncal
17:00 UTC−5	González 4'	Report	Reasco 90+4' (pen.)	Stadium: Municipal; Referee: Bryan Loayza
	Penalties
	Celedón (penalty scored); Ramírez (penalty scored); Mairongo (penalty scored); Chichande (penalty scored); Díaz (penalty scored)		(penalty scored) Reasco; (penalty scored) Mejía; (penalty scored) Anangonó; (penalty missed) De Jesús

26 September 2025	Cuenca Juniors	6–1	La Cantera	Cuenca
19:00 UTC−5	Ibarra 2'; Mercado 13'; Preciado 32'; Ordóñez 69', 78'; Asagidigbi 84'	Report	Tello 63'	Stadium: Alejandro Serrano Aguilar; Referee: Edison Silva

1 October 2025	LDU Portoviejo	1–3	Universidad Católica	Portoviejo
19:00 UTC−5	Riascos 74'	Report	Alonso 1'; Clavijo 54'; Londoño 90+7'	Stadium: Reales Tamarindos; Referee: Anthony Díaz

2 October 2025	Deportivo Santo Domingo	2–3	Guayaquil City	Santo Domingo
19:00 UTC−5	Villacrés 10' (pen.); Arboleda 43'	Report	Palma 1'; Mero 52'; Naula 81'	Stadium: Etho Vega; Referee: Robert Cabrera

8 October 2025	Leones	0–0 (2–4 p)	Emelec	Quito
16:00 UTC−5		Report		Stadium: Gonzalo Pozo Ripalda; Referee: Gabriel González
	Penalties
	Oña (penalty scored); Porozo (penalty scored); Caicedo (penalty missed); Kestler (penalty missed)		(penalty scored) Barco; (penalty scored) Cevallos; (penalty scored) Ruiz; (penalty missed) Quintero; (penalty scored) León
Note: Match originally scheduled for 1 October 2025 at Estadio Olímpico in Ibarra but postponed to 8 October due to blockades in the roads leading to the city. It was later moved to Quito.

8 October 2025	Gualaceo	0–6	Independiente del Valle	Cuenca
19:00 UTC−5		Report	Hoyos 9', 46', 55', 62'; Cazares 28'; Pata 83'	Stadium: Alejandro Serrano Aguilar; Referee: Yerson Zambrano

9 October 2025	San Antonio	0–4	LDU Quito	Quito
17:00 UTC−5		Report	Estrada 6', 56', 63'; Cuero 90+1'	Stadium: Olímpico Atahualpa; Referee: Gorky Araujo
Note: Match originally scheduled at Estadio Olímpico in Ibarra but moved to Quito due to blockades in the roads leading to Ibarra.

== Quarter-finals ==
Matches in this round were played from 13 October to 12 November 2025.

13 October 2025	Independiente del Valle	1–2	Universidad Católica	Quito
18:00 UTC−5	Hoyos 19'	Report	Alonso 32', 38'	Stadium: Banco Guayaquil; Referee: Gorky Araujo

22 October 2025	Cuenca Juniors	2–1	9 de Octubre	Cuenca
15:00 UTC−5	Zambrano 22'; Ordóñez 45+4' (pen.)	Report	Arroyo 57'	Stadium: Alejandro Serrano Aguilar; Referee: Lenin Quiñónez

22 October 2025	Guayaquil City	0–0 (0–2 p)	Emelec	Guayaquil
18:00 UTC−5		Report		Stadium: Christian Benítez Betancourt; Referee: Oswaldo Contreras
	Penalties
	Ordóñez (penalty missed); Palma (penalty missed); Plada (penalty missed); Mancilla (penalty missed)		(penalty scored) Barco; (penalty scored) Cevallos; (penalty missed) Solís; (penalty missed) Cueva

12 November 2025	LDU Quito	2–0	Deportivo Cuenca	Quito
19:00 UTC−5	Alzugaray 45+1' (pen.); Quiñónez 68' (pen.)	Report		Stadium: Rodrigo Paz Delgado; Referee: Yerson Zambrano

== Semi-finals ==
Team 1	Agg.	Team 2	1st leg	2nd leg
Emelec	2–2 (4–5 p)	LDU Quito	1–2	1–0
Universidad Católica	4–1	Cuenca Juniors	4–1	0–0

=== First leg ===
17 November 2025	Emelec	1–2	LDU Quito	Guayaquil
19:00 UTC−5	Barco 5'	Report	Estrada 83'; Medina 90+7'	Stadium: George Capwell; Referee: Lenin Quiñónez

25 November 2025	Universidad Católica	4–1	Cuenca Juniors	Quito
19:00 UTC−5	Londoño 64', 67'; Romero 74'; Fajardo 81' (pen.)	Report	Cangá 46' (o.g.)	Stadium: Olímpico Atahualpa; Referee: Alex Cajas

=== Second leg ===
2 December 2025	Cuenca Juniors	0–0 (1–4 agg.)	Universidad Católica	Cuenca
19:00 UTC−5		Report		Stadium: Alejandro Serrano Aguilar; Referee: Kevin Poveda

3 December 2025	LDU Quito	0–1 (2–2 agg.) (5–4 p)	Emelec	Quito
19:00 UTC−5		Report	Solís 61'	Stadium: Rodrigo Paz Delgado; Referee: Oswaldo Contreras
	Penalties
	Quiñónez (penalty scored); Villamíl (penalty scored); Cornejo (penalty scored); Estrada (penalty scored); Medina (penalty scored)		(penalty missed) Ruiz; (penalty scored) Cevallos; (penalty scored) Castelli; (penalty scored) Fragozo; (penalty scored) León

== Final ==
The final was played on 18 December 2025 at Estadio Olímpico Atahualpa in Quito.

18 December 2025
19:00 UTC−5

LDU Quito	2–3	Universidad Católica
Medina 37'; Minda 90+6'	Report	Alonso 17'; Anangonó 61'; Fajardo 89'

Estadio Olímpico Atahualpa, Quito
Referee: Álex Cajas

== See also ==
- 2025 Ecuadorian Serie A
- 2025 Ecuadorian Serie B
