= Jeremias (surname) =

Jeremias is a surname. Notable people with the surname include:

- Alfred Jeremias (1864–1935), German pastor, Assyriologist and expert on the religions of the ancient Near East
- Antónino Filipe Tchiyulo Jeremias (born 1953), Angolan politician
- Fernão Jeremias (1080–11??), Portuguese knight
- Gergő Jeremiás (born 1985), Hungarian retired footballer and football trainer
- Joachim Jeremias (1900–1979), German Lutheran theologian, university professor and abbot of Bursfelde
- Otakar Jeremiáš (1892–1962), Czech composer, conductor and teacher
