= Jeremias (disambiguation) =

Jeremias is an alternate spelling of the name of the Hebrew prophet Jeremiah.

Jeremias may also refer to:

== People ==
- Jeremias (given name)
- Jeremias (surname)
- Jeremías, stage name of Venezuelan singer and songwriter Carlos Eduardo Lopez Avila (born 1973)
- Jeremias Gotthelf, pen name of Swiss novelist Albert Bitzius (1797–1854)

== Other uses ==
- Jeremías Gómez, protagonist of El Jeremías, a 2015 Mexican comedy film
- Jeremías (album), a 2003 album by the Venezuelan singer
