= Jeremias (given name) =

Jeremias is an alternate spelling of Jeremiah, the biblical prophet. Others with the given name include:

- Jeremias II al-Amshitti (died 1230), Maronite Patriarch of Antioch
- Jeremias I of Constantinople (died 1546), Ecumenical Patriarch of Constantinople
- Jeremias II of Constantinople (c. 1530–1595), Ecumenical Patriarch of Constantinople
- Jeremias III of Constantinople (c. 1650/1660–1735), Ecumenical Patriarch of Constantinople
- Jeremias Augustin (born 1985), Swedish former ice hockey player
- Jeremías Azaña (born 2000), Argentine professional squash player
- Jeremías Bogado (born 1995), Paraguayan footballer
- Jeremias Chitunda (1942–1992), Angolan politician and Vice President of UNITA
- Jeremias Carlos David (born 1993), Dutch footballer
- Jeremias de Dekker (1609–1666), Dutch poet
- Jeremias Drexel (1581–1638), Jesuit writer of devotional literature and professor of the humanities and rhetoric
- Jeremias Falck (1610–1677), Polish engraver
- Jeremias Felbinger (1616–c. 1690), German Socinian writer, teacher and lexicographer
- Jeremias Friedrich Gülich (1733–1803), German dyer, writer, publisher and entrepreneur
- Jeremías James (born 2001), Argentine footballer
- Jeremias Conan Ledesma (born 1993), Argentine football goalkeeper
- Jeremias Lorch (born 1995), German footballer
- Jeremias Manjate (born 1998), Mozambican basketball player
- Jerry Navarro Elizalde (1924–1999), Filipino artist
- Jeremias Nguenha (1972–2007), Mozambican singer
- Jeremías Pérez Tica (born 2003), Argentine footballer
- Jeremias Ponce (born 1996), Argentine boxer
- Jeremias van Rensselaer (1632–1674), one of the founders and directors of the Dutch West India Company and first patroon of the Manor of Rensselaerswyck (in present-day New York state)
- Jeremias van Rensselaer (sixth patroon) (1705–1745), also Lord of Rensselaerwyck
- Jeremias Friedrich Reuß (1700–1777), German theologian
- Jeremias Benjamin Richter (1762–1807), German chemist
- Jeremias van Riemsdijk (1712–1777), Dutch colonial administrator, Governor-General of the Dutch East Indies
- Jere Rodríguez (born 1999), Argentine footballer
- Jeremias Schröder (born 1964), German Benedictine monk and Archabbot President of the Congregation of Sankt Ottilien
- Jeremias Ignaz Schiffermüller (1727–1806), Austrian naturalist and Jesuit teacher
- Jerry Singson (born 1948), Filipino politician
- Jerry Sitoe (born 1990), Mozambiquan footballer
- Jeremias van Vliet (1602–1663), Dutch merchant of the Dutch West India Company and writer
- Jeremias Wigger (born 1965), Swiss former cross-country skier
- Jeremias van Winghe (1578–1645), Flemish painter
- Jeremias Ziervogel (1802–1883), Cape Colony politician, civil servant, lawyer and businessman
