= Facundo Martínez =

Argentine-Uruguayan footballer (born 1985)

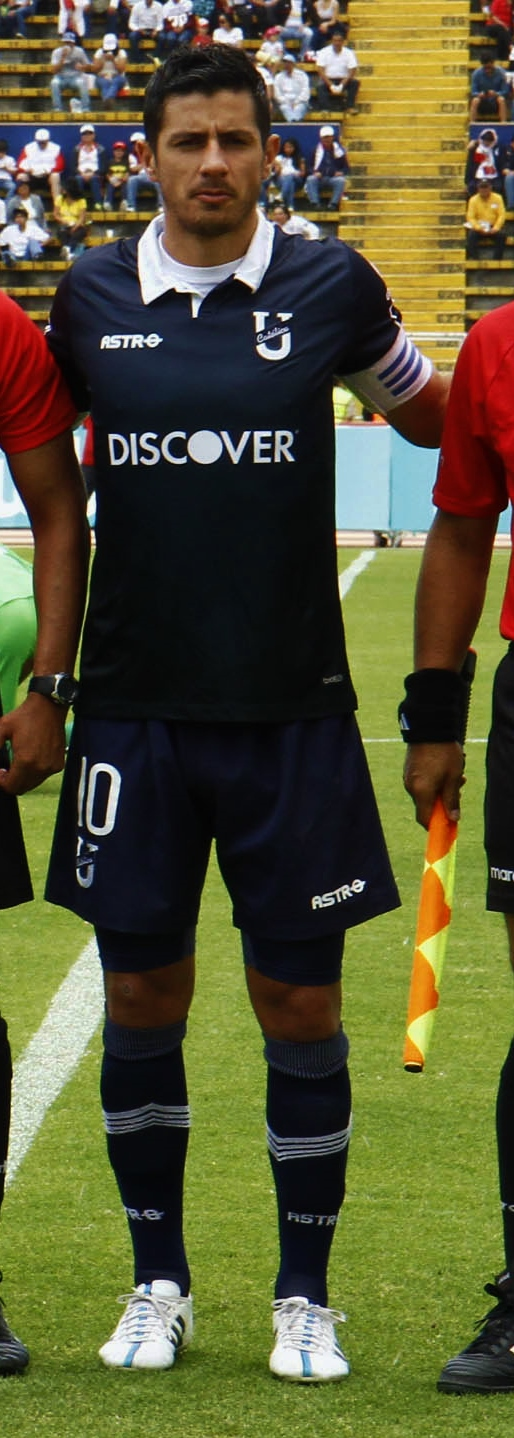

Personal information
- Full name: Facundo Martín Martínez Montagnoli
- Date of birth: 2 April 1985 (age 41)
- Place of birth: Buenos Aires, Argentina
- Height: 1.75 m (5 ft 9 in)
- Position: Midfielder

Team information
- Current team: Universidad Católica
- Number: 10

Youth career
- River Plate

Senior career*
Years	Team	Apps	(Gls)
2005–2006	River Plate	1	(0)
2006–2007	Atenas de San Carlos	27	(3)
2007–2008	Montevideo Wanderers	9	(0)
2008–	Rampla Juniors	6	(1)
2009–2010	Universidad Católica	40	(7)
2010	Tecnico Universitario	36	(9)
2011–	Universidad Católica	484	(48)
- * Club domestic league appearances and goals as of 21 December 2025

Facundo Martín Martínez Montagnoli (born 2 April 1985 in Buenos Aires) is an Argentine-Uruguayan footballer playing for Universidad Católica.

== Honours ==
Universidad Católica

- Serie B: 2012
- Copa Ecuador: 2025
