= Panbabylonism =

Archaeological school of thought

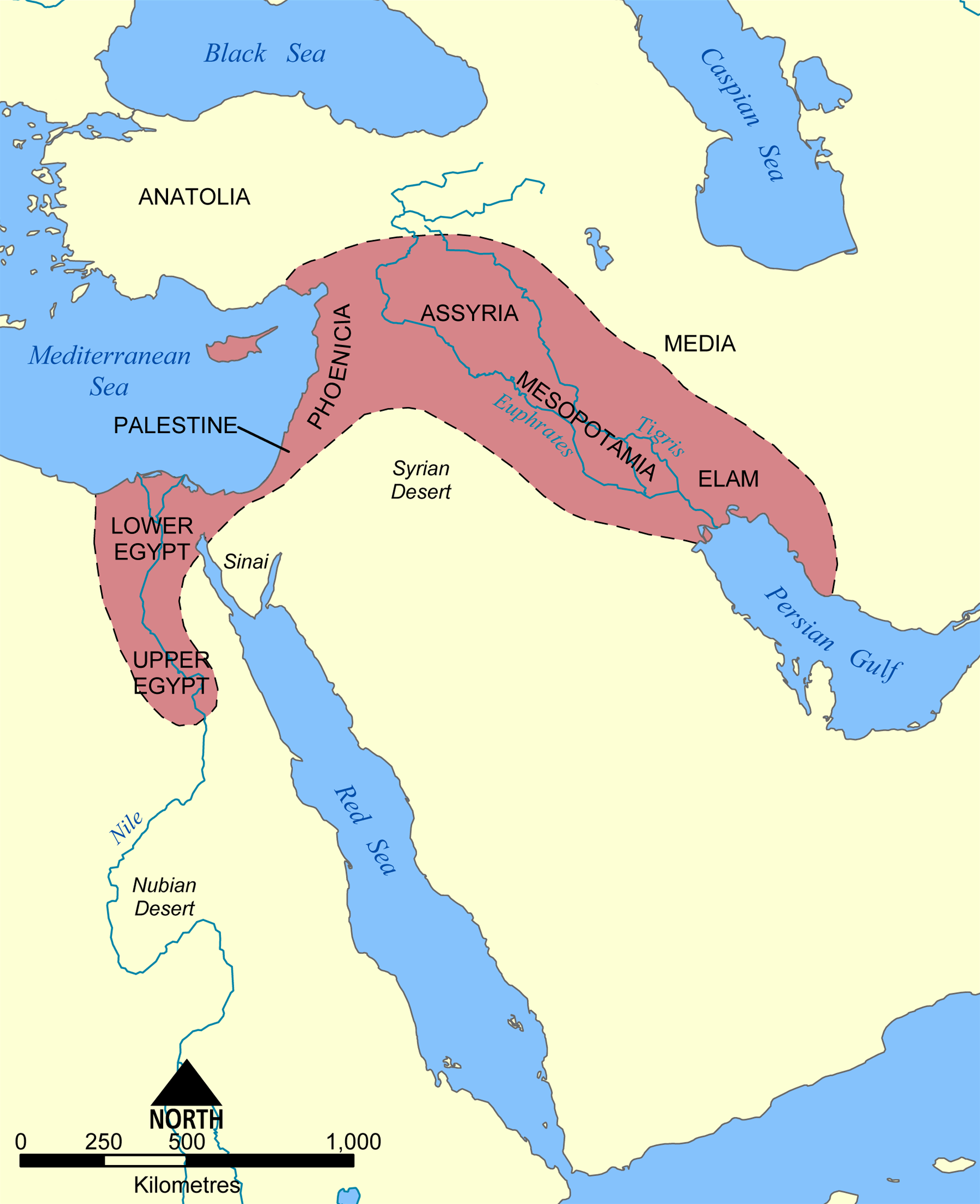
A map showing the generally defined area of the Fertile Crescent in red

Panbabylonism (also known as Panbabylonianism) was the school of thought that considered the cultures and religions of the Middle East and civilization in general to be ultimately derived from Babylonian myths which in turn they viewed as being based on Babylonian astronomy, often in hidden ways.

== Overview ==
A related school of thought is the Bible-Babel school, which regarded the Hebrew Bible and Judaism to be directly derived from Mesopotamian (Babylonian) mythology; both are forms of hyperdiffusionism in archaeology.

Both theories were popular in Germany, and Panbabylonism remained popular from the late 19th century to World War I. Prominent advocates included Friedrich Delitzsch, Peter Jensen, Alfred Jeremias and Hugo Winckler.

Panbabylonist thought largely disappeared from legitimate scholarship after the death of one of its greatest proponents, Hugo Winckler. The claims of the school were largely discredited by the astronomical and chronological arguments of Franz Xaver Kugler (a Jesuit priest).

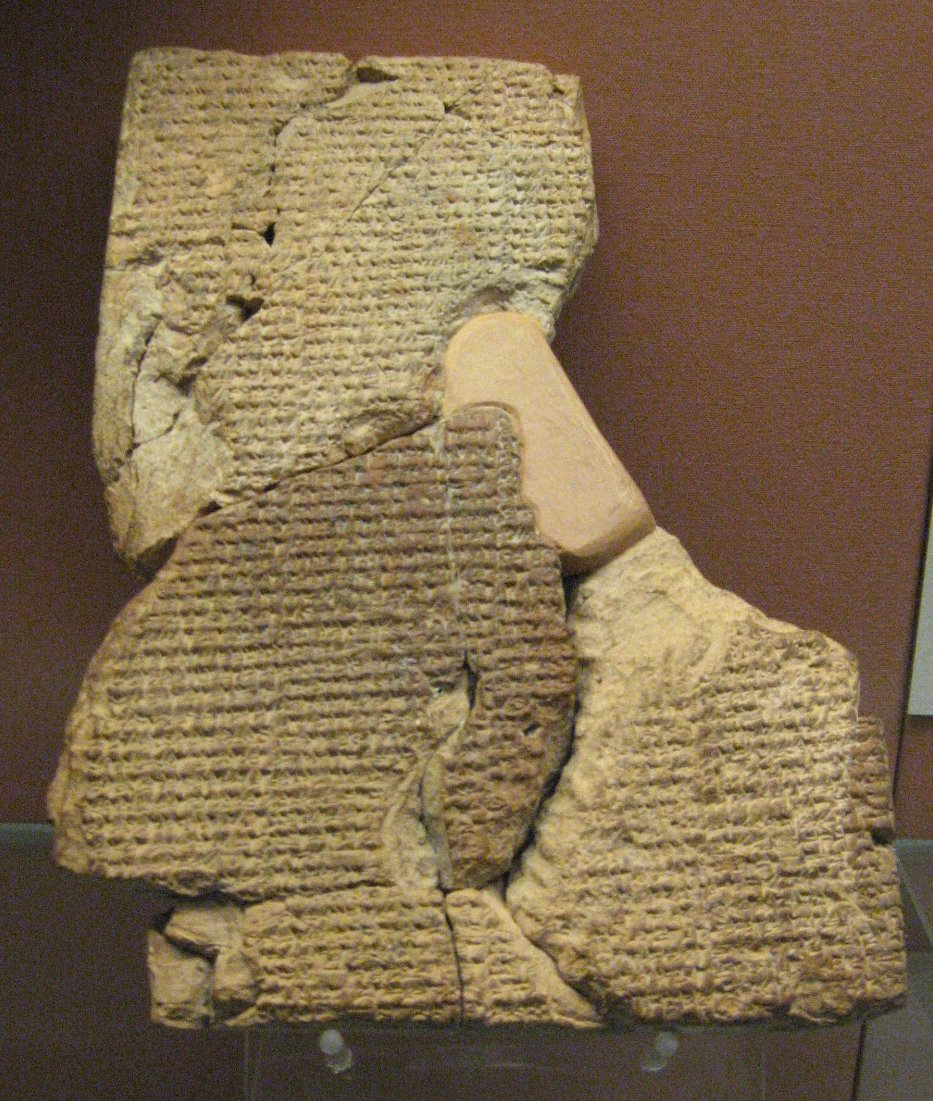
The Atra-Hasis on a cuneiform tablet in the British Museum

== See also ==
- Ancient near eastern cosmology
- Ancient Semitic religion
- Christianity and Paganism
- Comparative mythology
- Comparative religion
- Mesopotamian religion
- The Two Babylons
- Worship of heavenly bodies
