= Jeremiah (surname) =

Jeremiah and Jeremias are surnames.

Those bearing the name include:

- Alfred Jeremias (1864–1935), German historian
- Andrea Jeremiah (born 1985), Indian singer and actress
- Chitra Jeremiah (born 1971), Nauruan diplomat
- Ciaran and Kevin Jeremiah, (born c. 1970), in the English band The Feeling
- David Jeremiah (born 1941), American pastor
- David E. Jeremiah (1934–2013), American admiral
- Eddie Jeremiah (1905–1967), Armenian-American hockey player
- Ian Jeremiah (born 1970), Welsh cyclist
- Jesse Jeremiah, Nauruan politician
- Joachim Jeremias (1900–1979), German theologian
- Jonathan Jeremiah, British singer-songwriter
- Squire Jeremiah, Nauruan politician

== See also ==
- Geremia
