= Diego Martínez (football manager) =

Ecuadorian football manager

Personal information
- Full name: Diego Andrés Martínez Carrera
- Date of birth: 14 July 1987 (age 39)
- Place of birth: Quito, Ecuador

Team information
- Current team: Universidad Católica del Ecuador (manager)

Managerial career
- Years: Team
- 2016–2020: LDU Quito (youth)
- 2021–2022: Independiente del Valle (youth)
- 2022–2024: Ecuador U17
- 2024: Real Salt Lake U18
- 2025–: Universidad Católica del Ecuador

Diego Andrés Martínez Carrera (born 14 July 1987) is an Ecuadorian football manager, currently in charge of Universidad Católica del Ecuador.

== Career ==
Born in Quito, Martínez began his career with hometown side LDU Quito, as a manager of the under-14 squad. In 2021, he joined Independiente del Valle as an under-18 manager, before being announced as manager of the Ecuador national under-17 team on 16 July 2022.

Martínez led Ecuador in the 2023 South American U-17 Championship and the 2023 FIFA U-17 World Cup, finishing second in the former tournament. On 25 July 2024, he left the national side to join Real Salt Lake, as an under-18 coach.

On 20 December 2024, Martínez returned to his home country after being named manager of Universidad Católica del Ecuador. He led the team to the 2025 Copa Ecuador title, the first national accolade of their history, qualifying them to the 2026 Copa Libertadores.

== Honours ==
Universidad Católica del Ecuador

- Copa Ecuador: 2025
