= Thomas Gulich =

Swiss manager and entrepreneur

Thomas Jürg Gulich (born 1961) is a Swiss manager, entrepreneur and former sports official.

== Life ==
Gulich studied business informatics at the University of Zurich and later earned his doctorate. After professional positions at an IBM dealer and Swiss Re, Gulich worked for Credit Suisse from 1996. There, he was head of the leasing business in 2003.

In 2011, he founded Gulich Consulting AG.

Since December 2015, Gulich has worked for Spross Holding in Zürich and has power of attorney at its subsidiaries, Platanus Holding, Platanus Immobilien, Spross Muldenservice and Debag.

Gulich is married and father of two children. He lives in Männedorf. Gulich is an avid marathon runner with a personal best of just over 2 hours and 40 minutes.

== Sports official ==
In June 2003, Gulich was elected president of the Swiss football club Grasshopper Club Zürich. He was previously a member of the "Thursday Club", the club's supporters' association. In October 2004, Gulich resigned due to the club's lack of sporting success.
