= Geremia =

Geremia and Geremias are surnames.

Geremia can also be a name.

Those bearing them include:

== 14-17th century ==
- Geremia Ghisi, a Venetian nobleman who in ca. 1207 followed the Fourth Crusade
- Geremia da Montagnone (died 1320/1321), Italian judge and author active in Padua
- Pietro Geremia (1399-1452), Italian Roman Catholic priest and a professed member from the Order of Preachers
- Cristoforo di Geremia (1410–1476), Italian artist
- Geremia da Valacchia, O.F.M. Cap. (1556-1625), Blessed, Romanian-born Capuchin lay brother who served as an infirmarian of the Order in Italy

== 19-20th century ==
- Andreas Geremia (fl. 1980s), German musician in band Tankard band
- Conceição Geremias (born 1956), Brazilian athlete
- Jérémie Roumegous Geremia (born 1985), French footballer
- Nery Geremias Orellana (1985–2011), Honduran journalist
- Paul Geremia (born 1944), American musician
- Steph Geremia, Irish-American female flute player and singer
- Geremia Bonomelli (1831–1914), Italian Roman Catholic bishop of Cremona

== See also ==
- Jeremiah (surname)
