= Antónino Filipe Tchiyulo Jeremias =

Angolan politician

Antónino Filipe Tchiyulo Jeremias (born 16 June 1953), is an Angolan politician for the UNITA and a member of the National Assembly of Angola.
