= Márcos Cangá =

Ecuadorian footballer (born 1988)

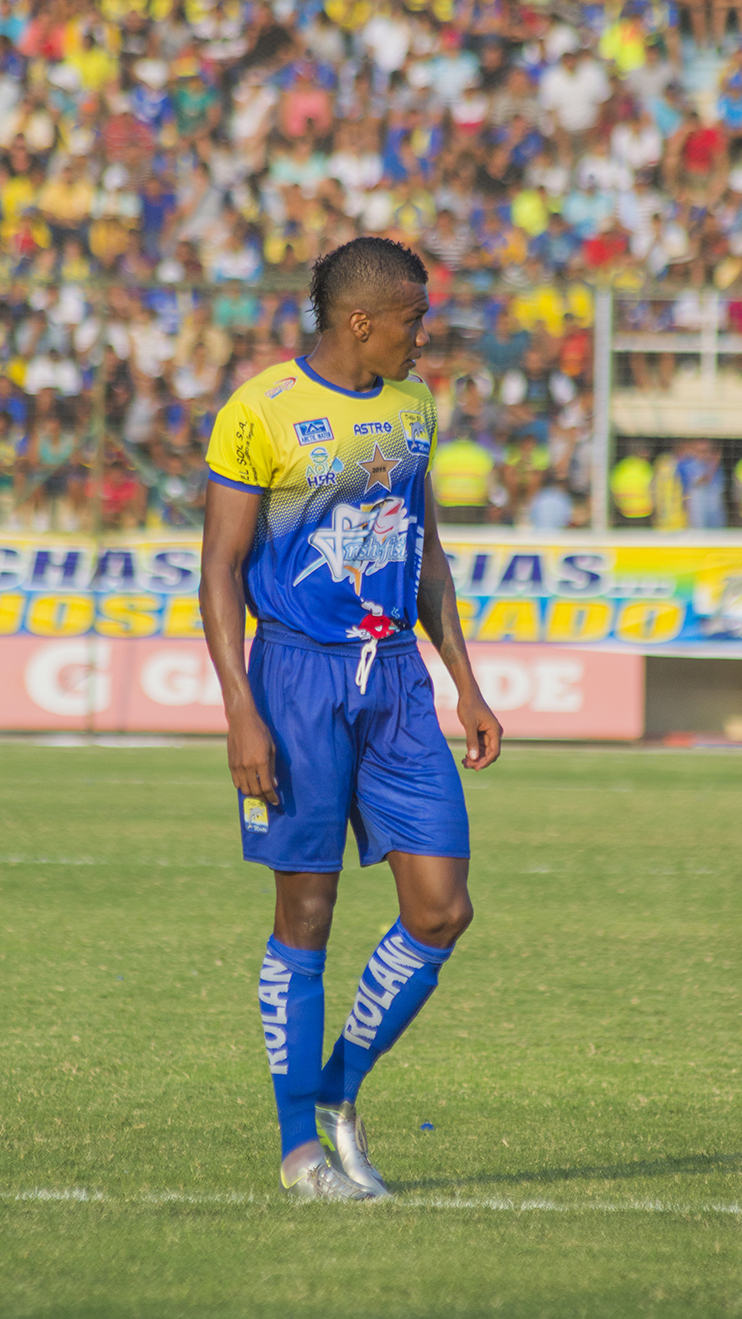

Personal information
- Full name: Marcos Fabián Cangá Casierra
- Date of birth: December 10, 1988 (age 37)
- Place of birth: Esmeraldas, Ecuador
- Height: 1.80 m (5 ft 11 in)
- Position: Right back

Team information
- Current team: 9 de Octubre

Youth career
- Tácito Ortiz Urriola

Senior career*
Years	Team	Apps	(Gls)
2006–2011	Tácito Ortiz Urriola		
2011	El Nacional		
2012	Juventud Minera		
2013–2017	Delfín	84	(4)
2018	Independiente del Valle	4	(0)
2019–	Guayaquil City	30	(1)
2020–2021	Orense	4	(1)
- * Club domestic league appearances and goals as of 17:35, 27 July 2020 (UTC)

Marcos Fabían Cangá Casierra (born December 10, 1988) and nicknamed "the Train" is an Ecuadorian defender currently playing for 9 de Octubre F.C. on loan from Guayaquil City of the Ecuadorian first division league.

Cangá featured regularly for Delfín S.C. as the club gained successive promotions to Ecuadorian Serie B and Ecuadorian Serie A.

== Honours ==
Delfín

- Ecuadorian Serie B: 2015
