= C.D. Universidad Católica (Ecuador) =

Association football club in Ecuador

Universidad Católica
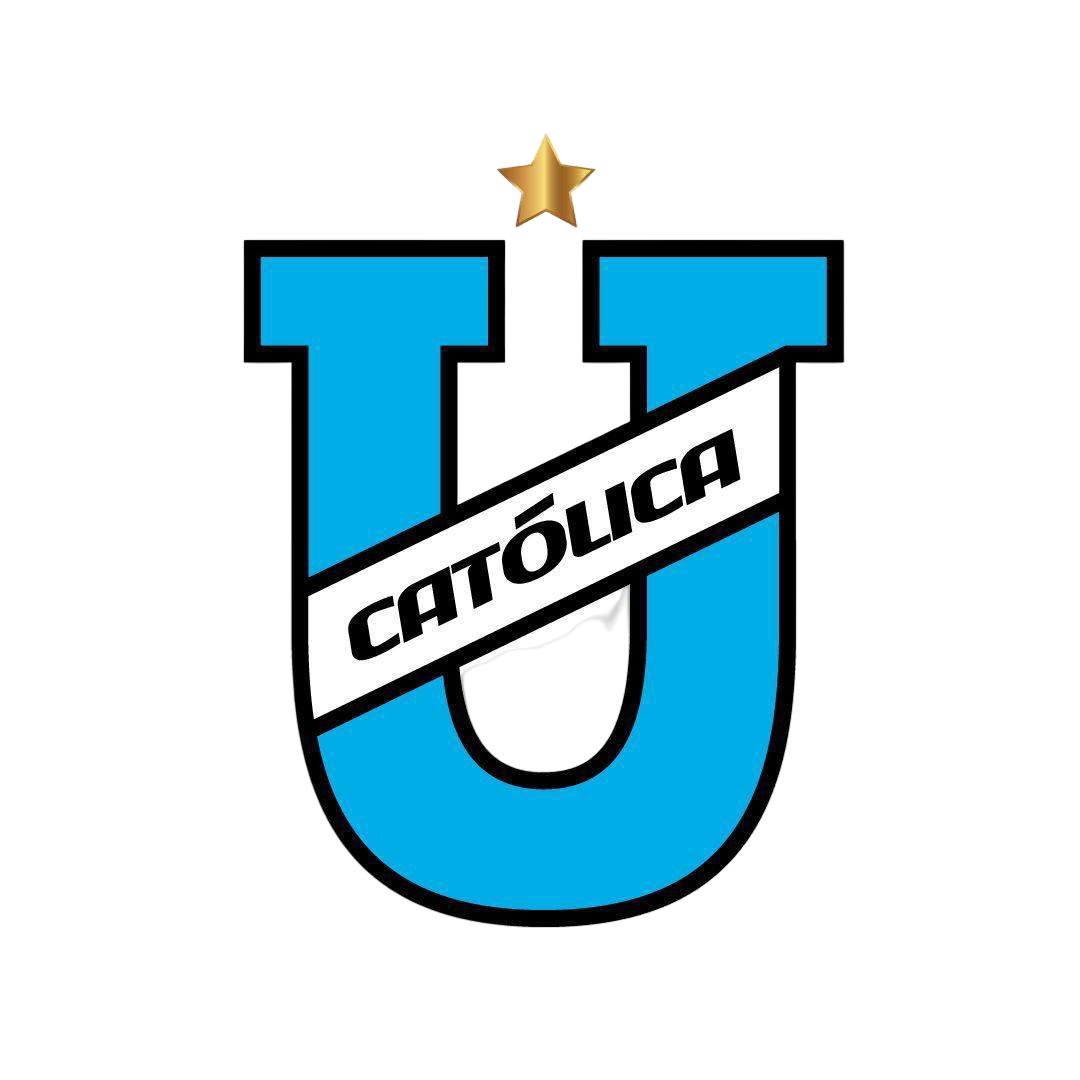
- Full name: Club Deportivo Universidad Católica
- Nicknames: Camaratta; Trencito Azul; Chatoleí
- Founded: 15 May 1963; 63 years ago
- Ground: Olímpico Atahualpa
- Capacity: 35,742
- President: Santiago Cattani
- Manager: Diego Martínez
- League: Ecuadorian Serie A
- 2025: First stage: 4th of 16; First hexagonal: 4th of 6
- Website: chatolei.com.ec
Home colours	Away colours	Third colours

Club Deportivo Universidad Católica, also known as Universidad Católica del Ecuador, is an Ecuadorian football club based in Quito. They play in the top tier of Ecuadorian football and have spent the majority of their history in the top-flight Serie A.

Universidad Católica was officially founded on 15 May 1963. Historic rivals include LDU Quito, Aucas, El Nacional and Deportivo Quito.

== History ==
Logo utilized until 2026

Universidad Católica was founded as a university football team for Pontificia Universidad Católica del Ecuador, a Catholic university in Quito. In 1962, they won the inter-university championship. Soon after, they became a football club on 15 May 1963 under Liga Deportiva de la Universidad Católica.

On 15 January 1965, they beat Club Gladiador for the right to compete professionally. They then won their first professional title at the 12th Interandean Professional Championship that same year.

In 1973 and 1979, Universidad Católica finished second in the national championship. As a result, they were allowed to participate in the Copa Libertadores the following years (1974 and 1980). They spent most of their history in the First Category (Primera A & Primera B). They descended to the Second Category in 1993. They returned to Primera B in 1998, and ascended briefly to Primera A for 2008.

== Honours ==
=== National ===
- Copa Ecuador
  - Winners (1): 2025
- Serie B
  - Winners (3): 1990 E1, 2007, 2012
- Segunda Categoría
  - Winners (1): 1998

=== Regional ===
- Campeonato Amateur de Pichincha
  - Winners (1): 1965
- Campeonato Professional Interandino
  - Winners (1): 1965
- Segunda Categoría de Pichincha
  - Winners (3): 1968, 1996, 1998

== Current squad ==
As of 10 April 2026. Note: Flags indicate national team as defined under FIFA eligibility rules; some limited exceptions apply. Players may hold more than one non-FIFA nationality.

No.	Pos.	Nation	Player
4	DF	VEN	Jhon Chancellor
5	MF	ARG	Jerónimo Cacciabue
6	DF	ECU	Diego Palacios (on loan from Corinthians)
7	FW	PAN	José Fajardo
8	FW	ECU	Emiliano Clavijo
9	FW	PAN	Azarias Londoño
10	MF	ARG	Facundo Martínez (captain)
12	GK	ECU	Johan Lara
13	FW	PAN	Everardo Rose
14	FW	ECU	Isaac Sánchez
15	DF	ECU	Luis Moreno
17	MF	ECU	Rooney Troya
18	FW	ECU	Byron Palacios

No.	Pos.	Nation	Player
19	DF	ECU	Marcos Sevillano
22	GK	VEN	Rafael Romo
23	MF	ECU	Andrés Rodríguez
24	MF	ECU	Darwin Nazareno
26	FW	ECU	Saenddy Yanez
28	MF	ARG	Mauro Díaz
29	DF	ECU	Gregori Anangonó
30	DF	ECU	Eddy Mejía
32	FW	URU	Mauricio Alonso
33	DF	ECU	Luis Cangá
37	DF	ECU	Carlos Medina
44	DF	ECU	Eric Valencia
—	DF	MEX	José Juan Manríquez

== Notable players ==
=== World Cup players ===
The following players were chosen to represent their country at the FIFA World Cup while contracted to Universidad Católica.

- (Panama) José Fajardo (2026)
- (Panama) Azarias Londoño (2026)

== Managers ==
- (Argentina) Jorge Célico (21 September 2010 – 5 August 2014)
- (Argentina) Luis Soler (5 August 2014 – 5 October 2014)
- (Argentina) Jorge Célico (5 October 2014 – 17 July 2017)
- (Argentina) Patricio Lara (17 July 2017 – 24 July 2017)
- (Argentina) Gustavo Díaz (25 July 2017 – 26 August 2017)
- (Argentina) Marcelo Romano (27 August 2017 – 4 November 2017)
- (Colombia) Santiago Escobar (4 November 2017 – 25 October 2021)
- (Argentina) Miguel Rondelli (26 October 2021 – 31 December 2023)

== Kit and colours ==
They wear sky blue on their home kit and white on their away kit. Their kit is supplied by Umbro.
