= José Fajardo (footballer) =

Panamanian footballer (born 1993)

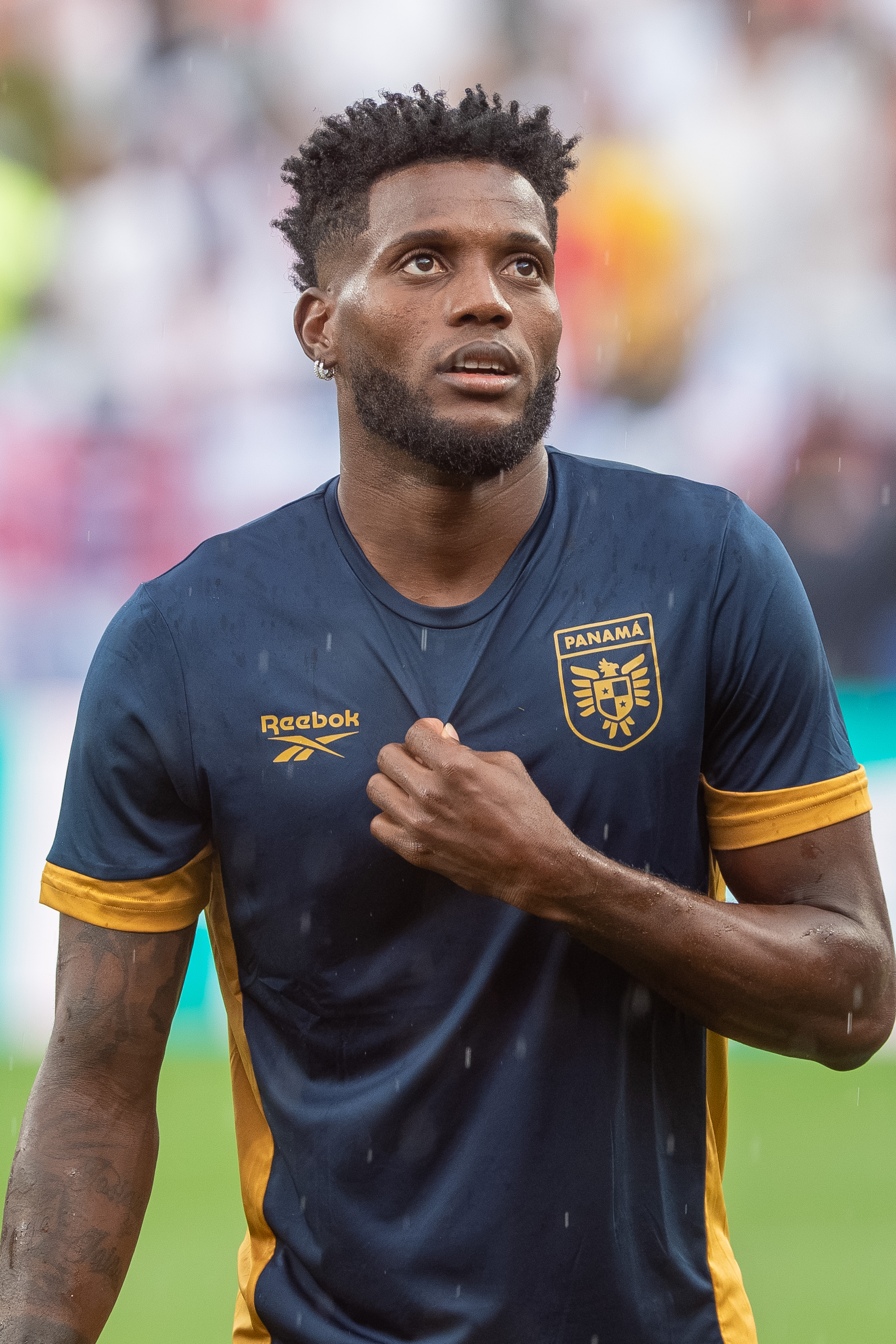
- Fajardo with Panama in 2026

Personal information
- Full name: José Fajardo Nelson
- Date of birth: 18 August 1993 (age 33)
- Place of birth: Colón, Panama
- Height: 1.80 m (5 ft 11 in)
- Position: Forward

Team information
- Current team: Universidad Católica
- Number: 7

Senior career*
Years	Team	Apps	(Gls)
2017–2021	CAI	58	(26)
2018–2019	→ Al-Kawkab (loan)		
2020	→ La Equidad (loan)		
2021	9 de Octubre	27	(12)
2022–2023	Cusco FC	37	(20)
2023	D.C. United	7	(0)
2024–2025	CAI	0	(0)
2024–2025	→ Universidad Católica (loan)	28	(13)
2025–	Universidad Católica	55	(20)

International career^{‡}
2017–	Panama	74	(19)
Medal record
Men's football
Representing Panama
CONCACAF Gold Cup
Runner-up	2023 United States–Canada	Team
CONCACAF Nations League
Runner-up	2025 United States	Team
- * Club domestic league appearances and goals as of 14 September 2026 ‡ National team caps and goals as of 15 November 2026

José Fajardo Nelson (born 18 August 1993) is a Panamanian footballer who plays as a forward for Universidad Catolica del Ecuador on loan from CAI and the Panama national team.

== Club career ==
Fajardo began his career with promoted side Independiente in the Liga Panameña de Fútbol during the 2017–18 season. Fajardo finished as top scorer of the 2018 Clausura, leading Independiente to their first ever national league title.

On 3 August 2023, Fajardo signed with D.C. United. On 1 December 2023, following the 2023 season, D.C. United declined Fajardo's contract option.

== International career ==
Fajardo made his international debut for Panama on 25 October 2017 in a 5–0 friendly away win against Grenada.

On 14 May 2018, Fajardo was included in Panama's preliminary squad for the 2018 FIFA World Cup, but was not able to make the final 23.

On 27 June 2024, Fajardo scored against the United States in the 2024 Copa América to win the game in the 83rd minute.

He represented Panama at the 2026 FIFA World Cup.

== Career statistics ==
=== International ===
As of match played 15 November 2026

Appearances and goals by national team and year
National team	Year	Apps	Goals
Panama	2017	1	0
Panama	2018	1	0
Panama	2019	7	0
Panama	2020	4	2
Panama	2021	10	1
Panama	2022	7	1
Panama	2023	13	6
Panama	2024	13	5
Panama	2025	7	2
Panama	2026	11	2
Total		74	19

Scores and results list Panama's goal tally first, score column indicates score after each Fajardo goal.

List of international goals scored by José Fajardo
No.	Date	Venue	Opponent	Score	Result	Competition
1	16 November 2020	Stadion Wiener Neustadt, Wiener Neustadt, Austria	United States	1–0	2–6	Friendly
2	16 November 2020	Stadion Wiener Neustadt, Wiener Neustadt, Austria	United States	2–3	2–6	Friendly
3	28 March 2021	Félix Sánchez Olympic Stadium, Santo Domingo, Dominican Republic	Dominica	2–1	2–1	2022 FIFA World Cup qualification
4	15 November 2022	Al Hamriya Sports Club Stadium, Al Hamriyah, United Arab Emirates	Venezuela	1–0	2–2	Friendly
5	28 March 2023	Estadio Nacional, San José, Costa Rica	Costa Rica	1–0	1–0	2022–23 CONCACAF Nations League A
6	26 June 2023	DRV PNK Stadium, Fort Lauderdale, United States	Costa Rica	1–0	2–1	2023 CONCACAF Gold Cup
7	30 June 2023	Red Bull Arena, Harrison, United States	Martinique	1–0	2–1	2023 CONCACAF Gold Cup
8	7 September 2023	Estadio Universitario, Penonomé, Panama	Martinique	1–0	3–0	2023–24 CONCACAF Nations League A
9	16 November 2023	Estadio Ricardo Saprissa Aymá, San José, Costa Rica	Costa Rica	2–0	3–0	2023–24 CONCACAF Nations League A
10	20 November 2023	Estadio Rommel Fernández, Panama City, Panama	Costa Rica	1–0	3–1	2023–24 CONCACAF Nations League A
11	9 June 2024	Estadio Nacional, Managua, Nicaragua	Montserrat	2–1	3–1	2026 FIFA World Cup qualification
12	27 June 2024	Mercedes-Benz Stadium, Atlanta, United States	United States	2–1	2–1	2024 Copa América
13	1 July 2024	Inter&Co Stadium, Orlando, United States	Bolivia	1–0	3–1	2024 Copa América
14	15 October 2024	BMO Field, Toronto, Canada	Canada	1–1	1–2	Friendly
15	14 November 2024	Estadio Nacional, San José, Costa Rica	Costa Rica	1–0	1–0	2024–25 CONCACAF Nations League A
16	10 October 2025	Cuscatlán Stadium, San Salvador, El Salvador	El Salvador	1–0	1–0	2026 FIFA World Cup qualification
17	13 November 2025	Cementos Progreso Stadium, Guatemala City, Guatemala	Guatemala	3–2	3–2	2026 FIFA World Cup qualification
18	15 November 2026	Estadio Rommel Fernández, Panama City, Panama	Curaçao	1–0	2–0	2026–27 CONCACAF Nations League A
19	15 November 2026	Estadio Rommel Fernández, Panama City, Panama	Curaçao	2–0	2–0	2026–27 CONCACAF Nations League A

== Honours ==
Independiente

- Liga LPF: 2018 Clausura

Cusco

- Liga 1: 2022

Universidad Católica

- Copa Ecuador: 2025

Panama

- CONCACAF Gold Cup runner-up: 2023
- CONCACAF Nations League runner-up: 2024–25
