= Fernão Jeremias =

- Knight
- Born: c. 1080; Burgos, Kingdom of Castile
- Died: 12th-century County of Portugal

Fernão Jeremias (c. 1080–11??) was a Portuguese medieval knight, he accompanied Duke Henry of Burgundy in his arrival to the County of Portugal.

== Biography ==
Fernão was born in Burgos in Castile, the son of Jeremias Mendes. His wife was Mor Soares, daughter of Soeiro Viegas., some chroniclers place this as the origin of the Pacheco since he received the lordship of Ferreira. This gentleman is descended from Vivio Pacieco, noble and Roman landowner who settled in the Iberian peninsula, flourishing in that region.
