= Osmar Fernández =

Paraguayan footballer (born 2000)

Personal information
- Full name: Osmar Fernández
- Date of birth: 20 February 2000 (age 26)
- Place of birth: Carapeguá, Paraguay
- Height: 1.80 m (5 ft 11 in)
- Position: Forward

Team information
- Current team: Daquilema

Youth career
- Sol de América

Senior career*
Years	Team	Apps	(Gls)
2018–2020	Sol de América	14	(1)
2021–2022	Atlético Colegiales		
2022	Crucero del Norte	17	(2)
2023	Atlético Colegiales	16	(3)
2023–2025	Daquilema		
2025–2026	Delfín SC	15	(1)
2026–	Daquilema	0	(0)
- * Club domestic league appearances and goals as of 23:24, 9 March 2026 (UTC)

Osmar Fernández (born 20 February 2000) is a Paraguayan footballer who plays as a forward for Ecuadorian club Daquilema.

== Career ==
=== Club career ===
Fernández is a product of Club Sol de América. He got his professional debut for the club in the Paraguayan Primera División on 8 December 2018, when he was in the starting lineup against General Díaz. In the following season, Fernández played 13 league games for América and scored one goal. In the 2020 season, Fernández played for the clubs U-23 team and was only on the bench for one Paraguayan Primera División.

In 2021, Fernández joined Paraguayan División Intermedia side Atlético Colegiales. In June 2022, Fernández joined Argentine side Crucero del Norte.

Ahead of the 2023 season, Fernández returned to Colegiales. Later in 2023, he signed for Ecuadorian side Daquilema FC.

In June 2025, Fernández joined Ecuadorian Serie A side Delfín SC.
