= John Percival Gülich =

John Percival Gülich (also Gulich) (26 December 1864 – 11 December 1898) was a British illustrator, engraver and artist.

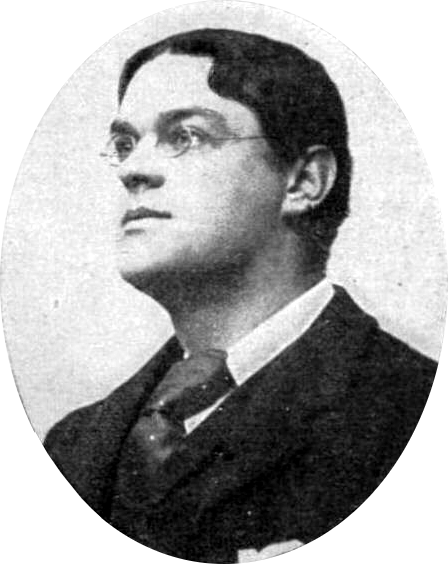
Photograph of John Percival Gülich

== Biography ==
Gülich was born in Wimbledon in 1864, the son of Hermann Gülich, a London merchant of German origin, and Eleanor. He was educated at Charterhouse School. He lived in Bremen for five years, working in his father's office. He became Art Editor of the illustrated newspapers The Pictorial World and The Graphic, and also contributed to Harper's Magazine. In 1897, he was elected as a member of the Royal Institute of Painters in Water Colours. One year later, on 11 December, he died of typhoid fever in West Hampstead at the age of 33.

== Works ==
Arguably Gülich's best known work is a watercolour entitled "A Violin Concerto" (1898), given to the Tate Gallery by Sir Henry Tate in 1899. Four of his works were exhibited at the Royal Academy of Arts between 1893 and 1898. Four of his drawings are held in the British Royal Collection.

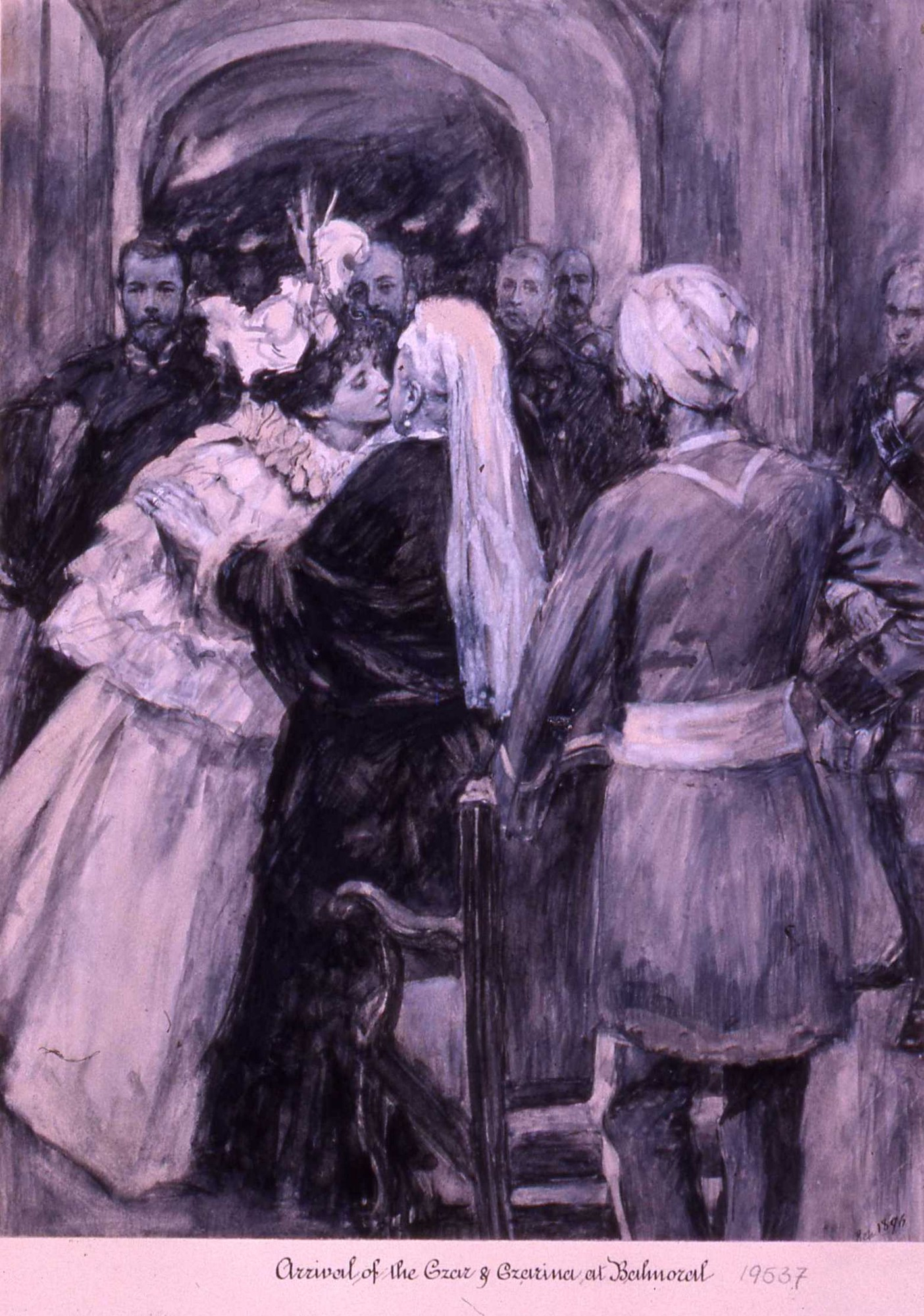
Arrival of the Emperor of Russia at Balmoral by J.P.Gulich (1896, Royal coll)

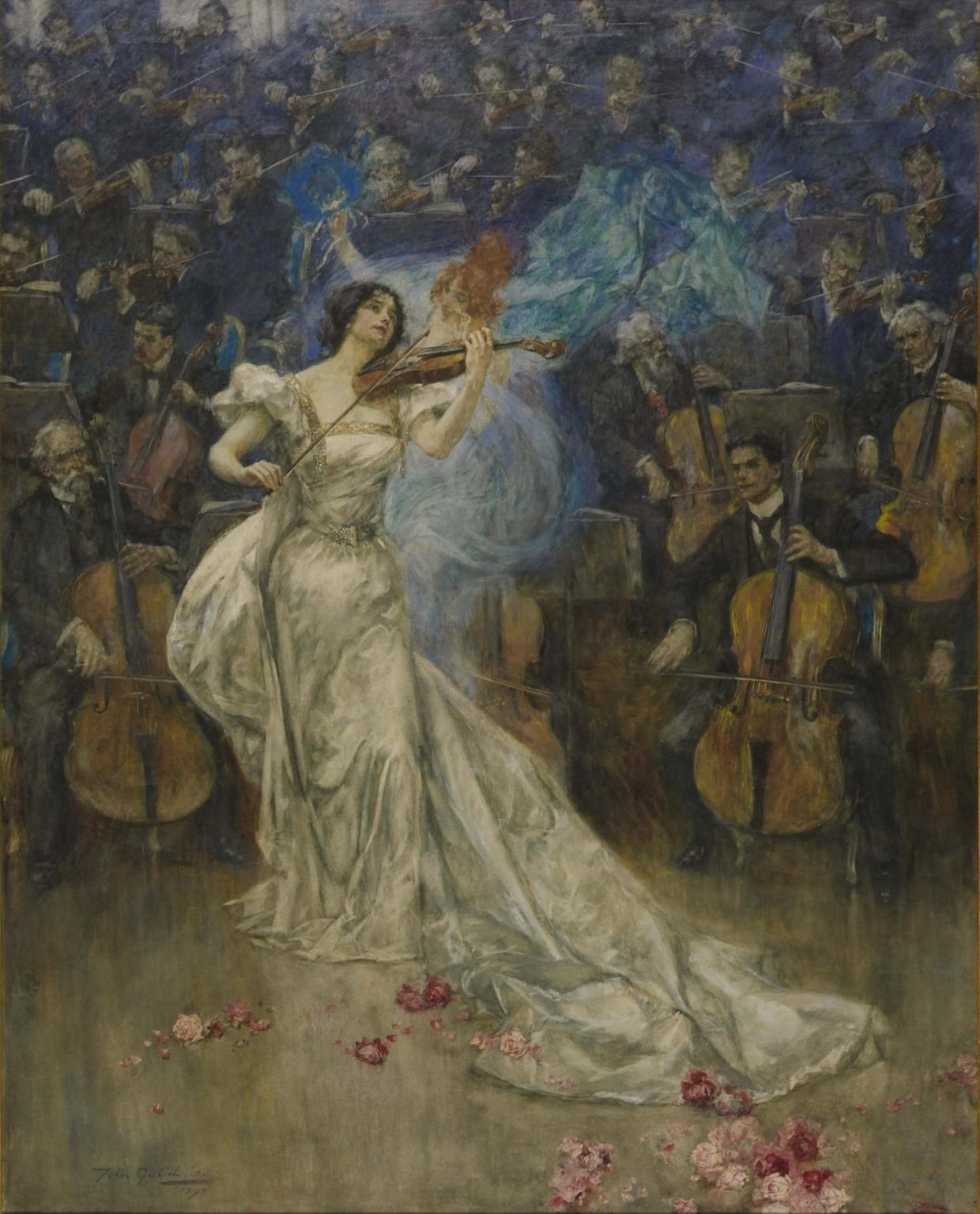
A Violin Concerto by J.P.Gulich (1898, Tate Gallery)
