= Azarias Londoño =

Panamanian football player (born 2005)

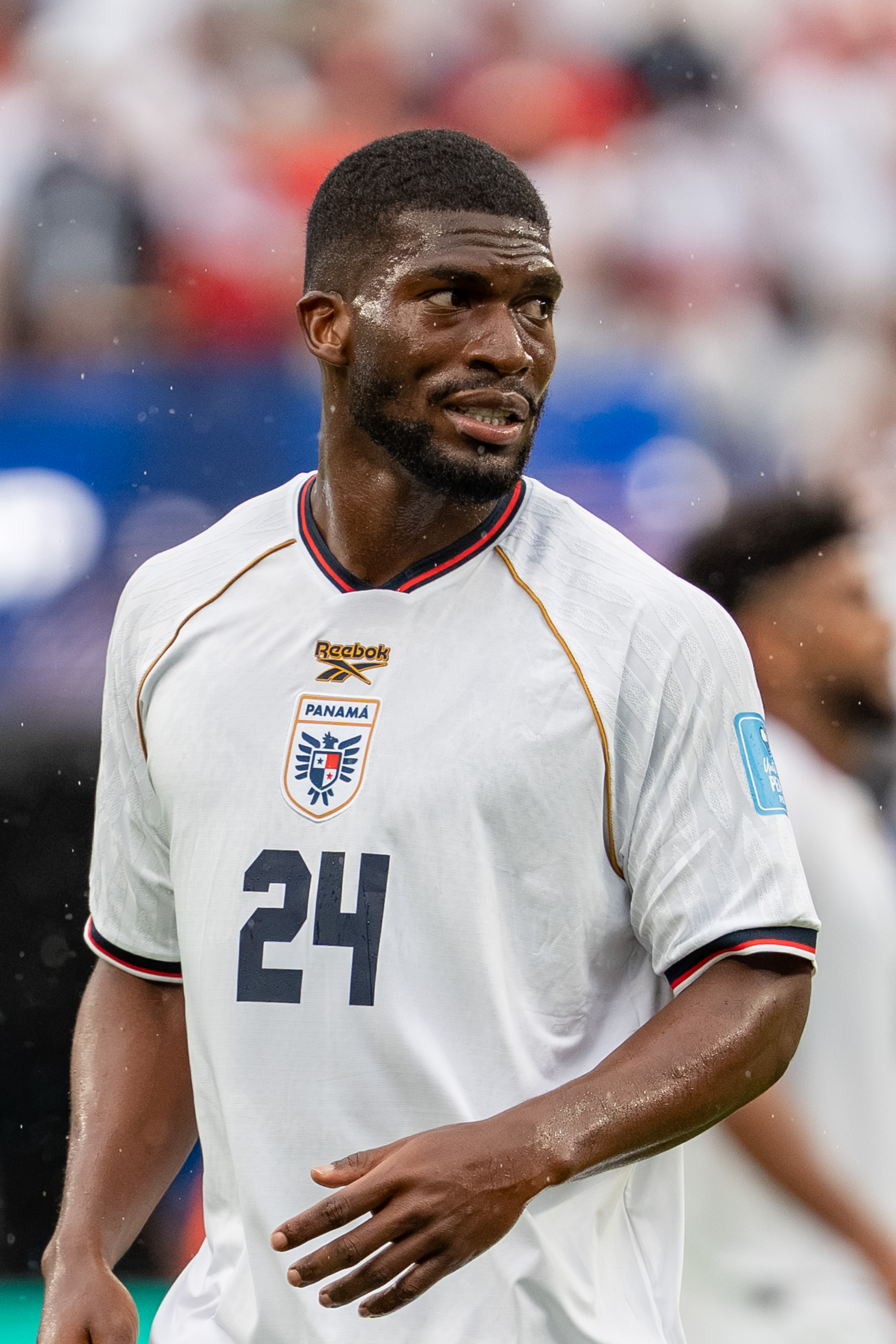
- Londoño with Panama in 2026

Personal information
- Full name: Azarias Emmanuel Londoño González
- Date of birth: 21 June 2001 (age 25)
- Place of birth: Panama City, Panama
- Height: 1.85 m (6 ft 1 in)
- Position: Forward

Team information
- Current team: Universidad Católica (on loan from Alianza)
- Number: 9

Youth career
- Alianza

Senior career*
Years	Team	Apps	(Gls)
2020–	Alianza	37	(6)
2021	→ O&M (loan)	0	(0)
2022–2023	→ Comunicaciones (loan)	29	(11)
2023	→ Torreense (loan)	2	(0)
2024	→ Comunicaciones (loan)	24	(3)
2025–	→ Universidad Católica (loan)	56	(11)

International career^{‡}
2022	Panama U20	3	(0)
2022	Panama U23	2	(0)
2022–	Panama	17	(1)
- * Club domestic league appearances and goals as of 22:45, 6 September 2026 (UTC) ‡ National team caps and goals as of 17:10, 1 October 2026 (UTC)

Azarias Emmanuel Londoño González (born 21 June 2001) is a Panamanian professional footballer who plays as forward for Universidad Católica, on loan from Alianza, and the Panama national team.

== Club career ==
=== Alianza ===
Londoño began his senior career with Alianza in 2020.

==== 2021: Loan to O&M ====
In 2021, he joined the Dominican club O&M on loan for the season.

==== 2022: Return to Alianza and first league title ====
Returning to Alianza, He helped them win the 2022 Liga Panameña de Fútbol.

==== 2022–23: Loan to Comunicaciones ====
On 18 August 2022, he was loaned out to the Liga Nacional de Fútbol de Guatemala side Comunicaciones.

==== 2023–24: Loan spells at Torreense and Comunicaciones ====
On 12 July 2023, he was then loaned to the Liga Portugal 2 side Torreense.

On 27 January 2024, he returned again to Comunicaciones on loan for the 2024 season.

==== 2025–26: Loan to Universidad Católica ====
On 8 January 2025, he joined the Ecuadorian Serie A club Universidad Católica on loan.

== International career ==
=== Youth ===
Londoño was called up to the Panama U20 for the 2022 Maurice Revello Tournament.

=== Senior ===
Londoño debuted with the made the Panama national team in a friendly 2–0 win over Bahrain on 27 September 2022. He was part of the squad for the 2023 CONCACAF Gold Cup. He again made the final Panama squad for the 2025 CONCACAF Gold Cup.

== Career statistics ==
=== International ===
As of match played 1 October 2026

Appearances and goals by national team and year
National team	Year	Apps	Goals
Panama	2022	2	1
Panama	2023	4	0
Panama	2025	5	0
Panama	2026	6	0
Total		17	1

Scores and results list Panama's goal tally first.

List of international goals scored by Azarias Londoño
No.	Date	Venue	Opponent	Score	Result	Competition
1	30 April 2022	WakeMed Soccer Park, Cary, United States	El Salvador	1–0	2–3	Friendly

== Honours ==
Alianza

- Liga LPF: 2022

Comunicaciones

- Liga Guate: 2023

Universidad Católica

- Copa Ecuador: 2025
