= Jeremiah (II) =

R. Jeremiah (II) (Hebrew: (רבי ירמיה (השני)) was a third-generation Amora sage of the Land of Israel and Babylon.

== Biography ==
In his early days he was the pupil of Yochanan bar Nafcha. Later he moved to Babylon which was a center for Yeshiva academies at the time, and where his pupils, Rav Huna and Rav Nachman were located. R. Jeremiah was the eldest of R. Yochanan bar Nafcha's pupils, and thus he said to R. Abbahu that there is a need to prefer his and R. Abin and R. Measha's opinion over the opinions of R. Abbahu and the rest of the young pupils.
