= Jeremiah (Book of Mormon) =

Nephite disciple in the Book of Mormon

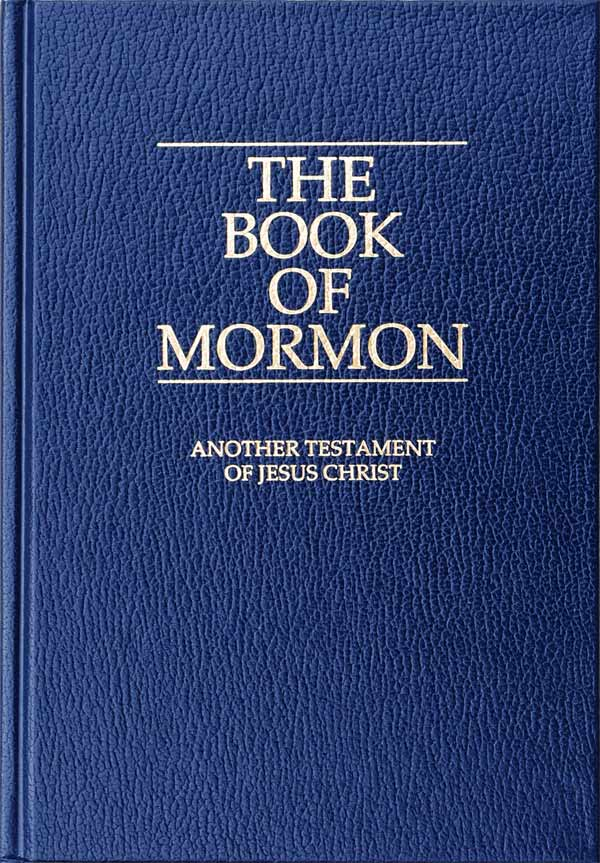
Book of Mormon, one of the Mormon scriptures, and also a source mentioning Jeremiah

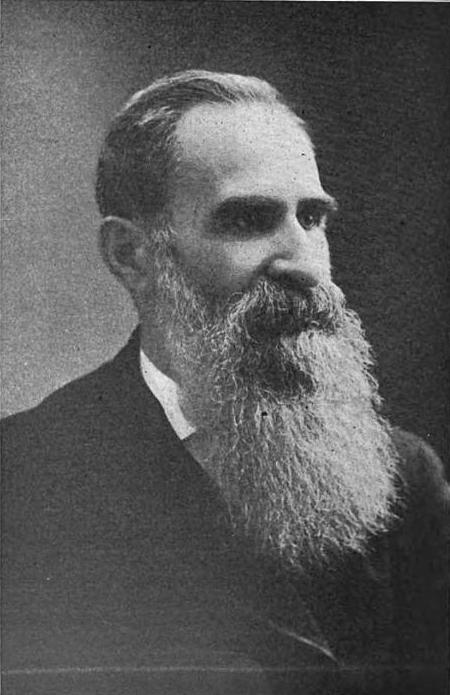
George Reynolds, one of the pioneers of the Book of Mormon research, in his work A Dictionary of the Book of Mormon, Comprising Its Biographical, Geographical and Other Proper Names, suggested that the results of the work of Jeremiah and his companions were felt in both South and North America.

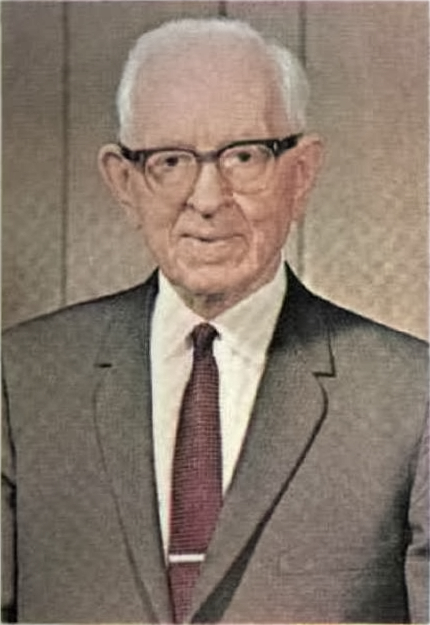
Joseph Fielding Smith, the 10th president of The Church of Jesus Christ of Latter Day Saints, analyzed certain doctrinal aspects of Jeremiah's mission, including the issue of his apostolic status.

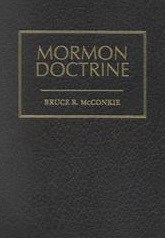
Cover of the second edition of Mormon Doctrine, a controversial work by Bruce R. McConkie. In this publication, the ministry of Jeremiah is described as apostolic.

Jeremiah (Deseret: 𐐖𐐇𐐡𐐀𐐣𐐌𐐂), in the beliefs of the Latter Day Saint movement (Mormons), was one of the Nephites called by Jesus Christ during his visit to the ancient American continent. Jeremiah's inclusion in the Nephite Quorum of the Twelve took place early. He taught a group of Nephites, conveying to them the content of the so-called sermon at the temple. He was baptized by Nephi, confirmed, and received the gift of the Holy Ghost. He underwent transfiguration, which was to be one of the signs of the ministry to which he was called among the Nephites. He began his missionary work while Christ was still on the American continent and achieved great success. The circumstances of his death are uncertain. Along with his companions, he is the subject of discussions among Mormon theologians. His status as an apostle, the matter of his rebaptism, and his direct prayer to Christ are of particular interest. He is used by apologists of this religious tradition and also appears in publications critical of the Book of Mormon. The name Jeremiah is given to children in Latter Day Saint families, including among Māori Mormons.

== Pronunciation ==
The pronunciation of this name has attracted the interest of Mormon researchers. It has been included in the pronunciation guide, which has been added to every English version of the Book of Mormon since 1981. However, sources indicate a significant difference between the preferred and commonly used pronunciation today and the one from the early period of the colonization of the Utah Territory. The original pronunciation, especially the one used by Joseph Smith, holds some significance in the study of proper names in the Book of Mormon, although it is not considered a decisive factor in Mormon theology. To determine the pronunciation used by Smith, researchers use, among other sources, the 1869 edition of the Book of Mormon in the Deseret alphabet.

There are, however, accounts from people involved in what the Latter Day Saints call the translation of the Book of Mormon, which shed light on how Smith originally dealt with unknown words. Hugh Nibley, referring to the accounts of Smith's scribes, stated that he never pronounced such words, always just spelling them out. Strictly from the standpoint of Mormon theology, there is no attempt to ascertain the original pronunciation of this word, just as such considerations are not pursued regarding Nephite words and names in general.

Also, within Mormon theology, there is a recognition of the inherent problematic nature of pronouncing the names and words found in this Mormon holy scripture. This stems from the fact that none of them were transmitted to Joseph Smith orally, except perhaps the name Moroni, who introduced himself to Smith in a vision. From a doctrinal perspective, the way the characters in the Book of Mormon pronounced these words remains unknown to the first Mormon leader.

Additionally, according to the Book of Mormon itself, the name Jeremiah was known to the Nephites not so much from the Old Testament transmission but from the record preserved on the brass plates. This collection, which was essentially the core part of the Nephite canon of holy scriptures, resembled the Old Testament. However, it was more extensive. It contained Torah, the history of God's interactions with the ancient Israelites, Lehi's genealogy, as well as prophecies from various prophets, including the content of the first chapter of the Book of Jeremiah. The text on the brass plates was preserved in Egyptian, not Hebrew. The best source for understanding its content is the so-called Joseph Smith Translation of the Bible, which is ultimately based entirely on the prophetic authority of Joseph Smith. Any speculation about how the Nephites might have pronounced Old Testament names is ultimately based on the same foundation, especially since the text of the golden plates, which Smith received, was said to have used what is known as Reformed Egyptian.

== Location in the Book of Mormon ==
In a strictly theological sense, the account of Jeremiah is found in the section of material referred to as the larger plates of Nephi. It is part of the plates of Mormon, as well as a summary of the larger plates of Nephi made by Mormon. It remains within the text shortened and edited by Mormon, without the involvement of Moroni. In the official editions of the Book of Mormon, including the one in use since 1981, it appears directly only in the fourth verse of the 19th chapter of the Third Book of Nephi. The contemporary system of chapter and verse divisions dates back to 1879. In the first edition published in 1830, the mention of Jeremiah was part of the ninth chapter of the same book. It is estimated that the passage directly referring to this disciple was written on 16 May 1829.

In addition to the mentioned direct reference, Jeremiah appears multiple times in various other chapters of the Third Book of Nephi, always as part of the twelve Nephites. He similarly appears in verses one to three of the second chapter of the Book of Moroni, as well as in the early sections of the Fourth Book of Nephi.

== Events related to Christ's visit to the American continent ==
He was among the twelve disciples called by Christ during his visit to the ancient American continent. His calling was foretold by prophets appearing in the Book of Mormon approximately 600 years earlier. The vast majority of information about him comes from records concerning all twelve Nephite disciples. Commentators have noted that it is likely that Jeremiah's inclusion in the Nephite Quorum of the Twelve happened early, possibly on the first day of Jesus' visit.

He was given the power to baptize, and as a member of the twelve, he was part of the body presiding over the Church of Christ among the Nephites. He conveyed to a group of his fellow countrymen the message of Christ contained in what Mormon theologians call the sermon in the temple. According to commentators, in these circumstances, he could have taught about 2,500 people – men, women, and children. These teachings, based on speculation, might have lasted several hours and are chronologically placed in the morning hours of the second day of Jesus' ministry in the Americas.

He then prayed with his companions for the gift of the Holy Spirit. He was also baptized by Nephi, a disciple who, according to commentators, held a role equivalent to the modern President of the Quorum of the Twelve. His baptism might have taken place in the Sidon river, though this is merely interpretive speculation. He was then confirmed and received the previously mentioned gift of the Holy Spirit. He was then surrounded by "what seemed like fire", and angels descended from heaven, ministering to him and his companions. It has been observed that in this way, he became as innocent in God's eyes as Nephite children, who had experienced a similar event shortly before.

Among the spiritually purified disciples, including Jeremiah, Jesus then descended from heaven and ministered to them as well. Interpretations of the text emphasize that Jesus regarded Jeremiah and his companions as friends and obedient servants. He commanded them to kneel on the ground and pray. In the subsequent prayer, Jeremiah and his apostolic brethren addressed Jesus directly rather than the Father, as is customary in modern Latter Day Saint religious practice. This was justified, among other reasons, by Christ's personal presence during the prayer.

They continued to pray even during Jesus' first private prayer of thanksgiving to the Father. Commentators have noted the influence of the Holy Spirit on the hearts and minds of the twelve Nephite disciples, including Jeremiah, in this situation. Theologically, it has been pointed out that in his final redaction, Mormon did not convey the desires that the Nephite disciples might have expressed at this moment. Therefore, their desires were likely aligned with the will of the Father. The Nephite apostles were learning and being strengthened through their prayers, possessing the mind and desires of Christ in this act.

Jeremiah and his companions experienced transfiguration, which was to be a sign of their ministry among the Nephites. Their transformation and prayerful focus pleased Jesus, who smiled at them. They were also to become attuned to God's truths through their steadfast and fervent faith. They remained in fervent prayer during Jesus' second private prayer, united in devout dedication, which again seemed to bring joy to Christ.

After the prayers ended, they participated in the sacrament, being the first to partake of bread and wine as baptized members of the Church of Christ. Later, they also helped distribute the bread and wine among the assembled Nephites. Jeremiah might have been responsible for the previously mentioned group of about 2,500 people, which would have made the ritual quite time-consuming.

The source record, less detailed about the disciples in later sections, nonetheless states that they began baptizing and teaching while Christ was still among the Nephites. Commentators note that each baptized individual also had hands laid upon their head with the promise of the gift of the Holy Spirit, according to their faithfulness. It is unknown how much time passed between the first three days of Jesus' visit and his next appearance. It can be assumed that the initial area of activity for the twelve was the city and land of Bountiful. It is also unknown how long their mission beyond the city limits lasted, but some time must have passed before the disciples met again. Christ's next appearance, which followed shortly thereafter, was dedicated to the proper name of the church. The disciples were also interested in their future roles as God's servants.

Christ again emphasized the necessity for Nephite disciples, including Jeremiah, to keep accurate records of their ministry. Commentators see this as an indication of the disciples' responsibility for the righteousness of their Nephite brethren. They also noted the potentially significant political consequences of the question posed by the disciples regarding the proper name of the church.

== Further ministry ==
After the Nephite phase of Christ's ministry and his final ascension, the disciples, including Jeremiah, continued their apostolic work with great zeal. They experienced tremendous success. Elder George Reynolds, in his 1891 publication A Dictionary of the Book of Mormon, Comprising Its Biographical, Geographical and Other Proper Names, mentions this period of Jeremiah's activity along with that of his companions, stating that "in a short time, every soul on both [American] continents accepted the message they carried".

However, this statement should be understood in the context of the church's current doctrinal position. Regarding the events in the Book of Mormon, the church only states that they took place in the ancient Americas without providing further specifics. Nevertheless, it is reasonable to assume that their ministry extended across all Nephite-inhabited lands, as well as that the Gospel was rapidly and universally accepted within this imagined geographical context.

== Death ==
It is impossible to determine the exact time of Jeremiah's death. If one assumes that the youngest of the disciples was 20 years old at the time of his calling, then the latest possible date of his passing would be 86 CE. This aligns with Christ's promise recorded in the third verse of the 28th chapter of 3 Nephi. However, the text itself does not provide a definitive resolution. Theologians have noted a reference stating that the last of the disciples died between 79 and 100 CE.

It is unknown whether he was among the three Nephite disciples, as this information was divinely "concealed from the world". If he was indeed part of this group, his body was transfigured, receiving terrestrial properties in place of its previous telestial ones, and Jeremiah himself would remain on the earth until Christ's Second Coming.

Although, as mentioned, doctrine does not definitively state whether Jeremiah was one of the three Nephite disciples, this has not prevented the development of Mormon folklore around the issue. Oliver B. Huntington, one of the early members of the church, recorded in his journal on 16 February 1895 a note listing the names of these Nephite disciples. Jeremiah was not among them. While Huntington's journal is known for similar theological claims, often cited with reference to the prophetic authority of Joseph Smith, in this particular case, he did not provide any source for his information.

Regardless of whether he was one of the three Nephite disciples, he was said to have taught Joseph Smith. In this way, he was believed to have played a role in preparing the founder of the Latter Day Saint movement to fulfill his divinely assigned mission. This information comes from an account written by John Taylor, a close associate of Smith and the third president of the church.

== In the Book of Mormon studies ==
The existence of Jeremiah has not been confirmed in external sources. Linguists associated with The Church of Jesus Christ of Latter-day Saints have examined the etymology of this apostle's name. However, they have relied on the widely accepted etymology also used in biblical studies. The name is of Hebrew origin, derived from yʿešaʿyāhû, which is variously translated as salvation of Yahweh, deliverance of the Lord, or the Lord/Yahweh is salvation.

== In criticism of the Book of Mormon ==
Jeremiah, along with other Nephite disciples, has been referenced in critical analyses of both the Book of Mormon and Mormonism as a whole. Dan Vogel placed him within his naturalistic explanations of the origins of the Latter Day Saint scripture. To this end, he contrasted the extraordinary success of Jeremiah's missionary efforts and the resulting establishment of a theocratic government with the much more secular tendencies present in President Andrew Jackson's era. Vogel also suggested that selecting an Old Testament name for this figure was rather predictable. However, he saw it as evidence of Smith's reflection on the portion of the Book of Mormon manuscript that had previously been lost and was thus irretrievably gone. He speculated that the absence of the name Jeremiah in the original text in reference to any other Nephite might indicate that Smith spontaneously created the list of disciples.

== In Latter Day Saint theology ==
=== Question of apostleship ===
In the original scriptural text, Jeremiah and his companions are referred to only as "disciples", not as "apostles". However, Joseph Fielding Smith, an expert in Latter Day Saint doctrine and the 10th president of the church, noted that they received the fullness of the Gospel along with the authority and the Melchizedek priesthood, just as the apostles called in ancient Palestine had. Thus, they were divinely authorized to serve as special witnesses of Jesus Christ among their people and could be regarded as apostles sent to the Nephites. Discussing their relationship to the apostles of the early church in Palestine, Smith added that the Nephites were ultimately subject to the authority of Saint Peter. At the same time, their doctrinal status was equivalent to that attributed to Joseph Smith and Oliver Cowdery in the period known as the "dispensation of the fulness of times". Bruce R. McConkie, Smith's son-in-law and a member of the Quorum of the Twelve, referred to the Nephite disciples' ministry as "apostolic" in his controversial 1958 work Mormon Doctrine.

Sidney B. Sperry expressed a similar view, while also noting that, in a strictly theological sense, Christ's church can have only one Quorum of the Twelve at any given time. However, the Nephite disciples were unknown to their Palestinian coreligionists. The inhabitants of the American continent had the same right to an apostolic ministry as the people living around the Mediterranean. According to Sperry, the apostolic status of the Nephite disciples is supported by both the first and second verses of Moroni 2, as well as by Joseph Smith's statement on the presence of an apostolate in ancient America, dated 1 March 1842.

This concept is not new in Latter Day Saint thought. It was developed earlier by one of the early church leaders, George Q. Cannon. In 1882, during his service as First Counselor in the First Presidency, he gave a sermon in which he stated that "the keys were held in this case by Peter, as the head of that dispensation. Thus, those who received the apostleship on the American continent were to be judged by the Twelve from Jerusalem".

=== Issue of rebaptism ===
Some scholars specializing in Latter Day Saint theology and the analysis of the Book of Mormon have pondered why Jeremiah and the other Nephite disciples needed to be baptized again, even though it is evident that they had already undergone the ordinance. Joseph Fielding Smith addressed this question by explaining that the reason was the reorganization of the church under the Gospel's new dispensation. In this view, the church had previously existed in a legal sense. He thus linked the events described in the Book of Mormon with the early history of the Latter Day Saint movement. He pointed out that Joseph Smith and other early Latter Day Saints were also baptized twice, with the second baptism occurring on 6 April 1830, the day of the church's formal organization.

=== Question of praying to Christ ===
The act of prayer directed by Jeremiah and his companions directly to Jesus has also drawn interest from Latter Day Saint theologians, mainly because of its aforementioned uniqueness within Latter Day Saint culture. Bruce R. McConkie examined this aspect of Jeremiah's account, explaining that Jesus Christ, being physically present among them, represented the Father. Seeing him was therefore the same as seeing the Father, and praying to him was like praying to the Father. However, he acknowledged the exceptional and unrepeatable nature of the event. As he stated, it occurred only this one time in all the long ages of the Lord's interactions with his children.

== In Latter Day Saint culture ==
Regardless of the surrounding etymological and theological speculations, Jeremiah has found a place in Latter Day Saint culture. Along with his companions, he appeared in the fourth season of the Book of Mormon Videos series, produced under the church's initiative. He was also depicted, again with his fellow disciples, in Scripture Stories Coloring Book: Book of Mormon, a children's coloring book published by the church. The name Jeremiah (rendered as Ihaia) appears among Māori adherents of the Latter Day Saint faith.

== Bibliography ==
- Largey, Dennis L., ed. (2003). The Book of Mormon Reference Companion. Salt Lake City: Deseret Book. ISBN 978-1-60908-763-0.
- Nyman, Monte S.; Tate, Charles D., eds. (1993). "The Twelve: A Light unto This People". The Book of Mormon: 3 Nephi 9–30, This Is My Gospel. Provo: Religious Studies Center. ISBN 0-8849-4913-3.
- Hyde, Paul Nolan (2015). A Comprehensive Commentary of the Book of 3 Nephi. Orem: Parrish Press.
- Gaskill, Alonzo L. (2015). Miracles of the Book of Mormon: A Guide to the Symbolic Messages. Springville: Cedar Fort Publishing & Media. ISBN 978-1-4621-1685-0.
