= Byron Palacios =

Ecuadorian footballer (born 1995)

Personal information
- Full name: Byron Efraín Palacios Vélez
- Date of birth: February 20, 1995 (age 31)
- Place of birth: Portoviejo, Ecuador
- Height: 1.84 m (6 ft 0 in)
- Position: Midfielder

Team information
- Current team: Universidad Católica
- Number: 18

Senior career*
Years	Team	Apps	(Gls)
2015–2016	Colón F.C.	17	(5)
2016	Rocafuerte F.C.	21	(13)
2017–2019	C.S. Emelec	7	(1)
2019–2021	C.D. El Nacional	34	(13)
2022	Emelec	4	(0)
2022	Técnico Universitario	14	(4)
2023–2024	C.D. El Nacional	38	(10)
2024–	Universidad Católica	34	(19)
- * Club domestic league appearances and goals as of August 20, 2025

Byron Efraín Palacios Vélez (Alhajuela, Portoviejo, Manabí, Ecuador; February 20, 1995) is an Ecuadorian footballer who plays as a midfielder or forward, and his current team is Universidad Católica from the Ecuadorian Serie A.

== Club career ==
He started as a footballer in Colón F.C., where he played in Ecuadorian Serie B, with which in the 2015 season he played 16 games and scored 4 goals.

In 2016, he arrived at Rocafuerte FC of the Second Category of Ecuador (a subsidiary of CS Emelec) at the request of coach Javier Klimowicz. Due to his good performances, he had with the team, the following year he became part of the Emelec reserves of Ecuadorian Serie A, where he manages to score several goals, including a triplet scored against Barcelona S.C. in a classic from Reserve Shipyard, which made the head coach at that time Mariano Soso summon him to the first team.

His debut with the main squad in Serie A was on October 21, 2018, in the game that his team faced Mácara, where he scored his first goal, which was the fastest of his career taking only 33 seconds in the field of play, that meeting ended with a score of 3 to 1 in favor of the electric team, a result that was useful for him to play the final of that season against the L.D.U. Quito, where he managed to play the second leg at the Stadium Rodrigo Paz Delgado, coming out runner-up.

In June 2019, he was loaned to El Nacional until the end of the season. He played his first match with the military jersey on the first day of the second stage of the 2019 Ecuadorian championship, where his team won 1 to 0 against Barcelona SC. His first goal with the Puros Criollos shirt marked him on date 8 of Serie A 2020 against the C.D. Olmedo, in the triumph of his team by 3 to 2.

== Career statistics ==
As of 29 June 2025.

Club statistics
Club	Season	League		Cup		Continental		Total	
Club	Season	Apps	Goals	Apps	Goals	Apps	Goals	Apps	Goals
Colón F.C.	2015	16	4	—		—		16	4
Colón F.C.	2016	1	1	—		—		1	1
Colón F.C.	Total	17	5	—		—		17	5
Rocafuerte F.C.	2016	11	7	—		—		11	7
Rocafuerte F.C.	2018	10	6	—		—		10	6
Rocafuerte F.C.	Total	21	13	—		—		21	13
C.S. Emelec	2018	6	1	—		—		6	1
C.S. Emelec	2019	1	0	1	0	—		2	0
C.D. El Nacional	2019	4	0	0	0	—		4	0
C.D. El Nacional	2020	18	1	0	0	0	0	18	1
C.D. El Nacional	2021	16	6	0	0	—		16	6
C.S. Emelec	2022	4	0	0	0	0	0	4	0
C.S. Emelec	Total	11	1	1	0	0	0	12	1
C.D. Técnico Universitario	2022	14	4	0	0	—		14	4
C.D. El Nacional	2023	26	7	0	0	4	2	30	9
C.D. El Nacional	2024	12	3	0	0	2	0	14	3
C.D. El Nacional	Total	76	17	0	0	6	2	82	19
C.D. Universidad Católica del Ecuador	2024	9	3	1	0	2	0	12	3
C.D. Universidad Católica del Ecuador	2025	18	9	0	0	6	1	24	10
C.D. Universidad Católica del Ecuador	Total	27	12	1	0	8	1	36	13
Career total		166	52	2	0	14	3	182	55
