= Alfred Jeremias =

German pastor and Assyriologist (1864–1935)

Alfred Karl Gabriel Jeremias (24 February 1864 in Chemnitz, Kingdom of Saxony – 11 January 1935) was a German pastor, Assyriologist and an expert on the religions of the ancient Near East.

== Life ==
In 1891 he published the first German translation of the Epic of Gilgamesh. From 1890 until his death he was pastor of the Lutheran congregation in Leipzig, and from 1922 he was also professor at Leipzig University. He received honorary degrees in 1905 from Leipzig and in 1914 from the University of Groningen.

He was one of the prominent advocates of Panbabylonism, explaining the origins of the Hebrew Bible in terms of Babylonian mythology.

== Literature ==
=== Publications ===
- Die Höllenfahrt der Istar. Eine altbabylon. Beschwörungslegende, Diss. phil. Leipzig; München 1886
- Bemerkungen zu einigen assyr. Altertümern in den K. Museen zu Dresden, in: ZA 1, 1886, 45–50
- Die Babylon.-assyr. Vorstellungen vom Leben nach dem Tode. Nach den Quellen mit Berücks. der alttestamentl. Parallelen dargest., Leipzig 1887
- Izdubar-Nimrod. Eine altbabylon. Heldensage. Nach den Keilschriftfragmenten dargest., Leipzig 1891
- Das Walten der Liebe in der Gemeinde. Predigt über Apostelgesch. 6,1–7, gehalten am 6. Sonntage nach Trinitatis in der Lutherkirche zu Leipzig, Leipzig 1891
- Das ewige Licht geht da herein! Festpredigt, zum 50. Jahresfeste des student. Missionsvereins zu Halle a. d. Saale gehalten am III. Adventssonntage 1892 in der Laurentiuskirche, Leipzig 1892
- Im Glauben klar! In Liebe wahr! In Hoffnung fröhlich immerdar! Festpredigt, bei dem 49. Jahresfest des Dresdner Hauptvereins der Gustav-Adolf-Stiftung am 12. Juli 1893 in Seifhennersdorf gehalten, Dresden 1893
- Vom reichen Manne und armen Lazarus der menschl. Gesellschaft. Predigt, den 7. Juni 1893 in Frankfurt/M. gehalten, Karlsruhe 1893
- Der Untergang Niniveh's und die Weissagungsschrift des Nahum von Elkosch [with Adolf Billerbeck], in: Beiträge zur Assyriologie 3, 1895, 88–188
- Fürchtet Gott - Ehret den König!, Leipzig 1898
- Totenkultus bei den Babyloniern, in: Wissensch. Beilage zur Leipziger Ztg. 1899, Nr. 138
- Hölle und Paradies bei den Babyloniern, Leipzig 1900; 2nd ed. Leipzig 1903
- The Babylonian conception of heaven and hell, London 1902
- Im Kampfe um Babel und Bibel. Ein Wort zur Verständigung und Abwehr, Leipzig 1902, 1903
- Babel-Bibel und Religionswissenschaft, in: Berliner Tageblatt. Zeitgeist Nr. 7, 1903
- Im Kriege um Babel und Bibel, in: AELKZ 36, 1903, 543–545
- Das AT im Lichte des alten Orients. Handb. zur bibl.-orient. Altertumskunde, Leipzig 1904, English London/New York 1911, 4th ed. 1930.
- Die Sprache der Sterne in der Babylon. und bibl. Vorstellungswelt, in: Berliner Tageblatt. Beil. Zeitgeist 1904, Nr. 21
- Babylonisches im Neuen Testament, Leipzig 1905
- Monotheistische Strömungen innerhalb der babylonischen Religion, Leipzig 1905
- Alter Orient und Alttestamentler, in: ThBl, 1905, 337–349; NT und Religionsgesch., in: Reformation 1905, Nr. 1
- Dormitio Sanctae Virginis, in: Illustr. Ztg. Leipzig, 19.4. 190
- Die Panbabylonisten, der Alte Orient und die ägypt. Religion, Leipzig 190
- Der Einfluß Babyloniens auf das Verständnis des AT, Berlin 1908 (Bibl. Zeit- und Streitfragen 4,2)
- Das Alter der babylonischen Astronomie, Leipzig 19082nd ed. Leipzig 1909
- Die Zeitrechnung der biblischen Urgeschichte, in: Reformation 1908, Nr. 5
- Urim und Tummim. Ephod. Theraphim, in: Hilprecht Anniversary Volume, Leipzig 1909, 223–242
- Hat Jesus Christus gelebt? Prolegomena zu einer religionswissenschaftl. Unters. des Christusproblems, Leipzig 1911
- Kanaan in vorisraelit. Zeit, Berlin 1911
- Handbuch der altorientischen Geisteskultur, Leipzig 1913
- Hugo Winckler. Gedächtnisrede, Mitteilungen der Vorderasiat. Gesellschaft 20,1, 1915, 1–12
- Christlicher und außerchristlicher Schicksalsglaube in Vergangenheit und Gegenwart, in: AELKZ 49, 1916, 754–758, 778–782 = Leipzig 1916
- Die sogenannten Kedorlaomer-Texte, in: Orient. Studien. FS Fritz Hommel I, Leipzig 1917, 69–97
- Allgemeine Religions-Geschichte, München 1918
- Denkschrift des Freien Arbeitsausschusses der sächs. ev.-luth. Landeskirche zur Mitarbeit bei der bevorstehenden kirchl. Neuordnung, hg. von Johs. Herz u. A. Jeremias, Leipzig o. J. [1918]
- Unsere Toten leben!, Leipzig/Hamburg 1918; Die soz. Aufgabe der Kirche, Leipzig 1918 (Kirchl.-soz. Heft 59)
- Die Religion im neuen Staat, in: Illustr. Ztg., Leipzig 1919, Nr. 3955
- Babylische Dichtungen, Epen und Legenden, Leipzig 1925 (AO 25,1)
- Johannes von Staupitz, Luthers Vater und Schüler. Sein Leben, sein Verhältnis zu Luther und eine Auswahl aus seinen Schriften übertr. und hrsg., Sannerz/Leipzig 1926
- Buddhistische und theosophische Frömmigkeit, Leipzig 1927, 2nd ed. 1929
- Jüdische Frömmigkeit, Leipzig 1927, 2nd ed. 1929
- Die außerbiblische Erlösererwartung. Zeugnisse aller Jahrtausende in ihrer Einheitlichkeit dargest., Berlin 1927
- Germanische Frömmigkeit, Leipzig 1928
- Leben im Kirchenjahr, 1928
- Johannes von Staupitz, Luthers Vater und Schüler, in: AELKZ 61, 1928, 368–391
- Der Babylonische Fixsternhimmel um 2000 v. Chr., in: Weltall 28, 1929, 73–75
- Die Weltanschauung der Sumerer, Leipzig 1929/30 (Der Alte Orient 27,4)
- Muhammedanische Frömmigkeit, Leipzig 1930
- Die Bedeutung des Mythos und [für] das apostolische Glaubensbekenntnis, Leipzig 1930
- Der Antichrist in Geschichte und Gegenwart, Leipzig 1930
- Panbabylonismus, in: RGG 2IV, 1930, 879 f.
- Die biblische Erlösererwartung, Berlin 193
- Der Schleier von Sumer bis heute, Leipzig 1931 (AO 31,1/2)
- Der Kosmos von Sumer, Leipzig 1932 (AO 32,1)
- Babylonische Dichtungen, Epen und Legenden, in: Anthropos 28, 1933, 790 ff.
- Evangelisches Christentum und Katholizismus. Antwort auf Karl Adam: Das Wesen des Katholizismus, Berlin 1933
- Die biblischen Urgeschichten in der Schule, in: ThBl 1935, 265–273
- Das Alte Testament im Lichte des Alten Orients, Leipzig,
- Handbuch der altorientalischen Geisteskultur, Berlin, 2nd ed. 1929

=== Obituaries ===
- E. Weidner, Archiv für Orientforschung Bd. 10 (1935/36), S. 195f.
- W. Baumgartner, Zeitschrift für Assyriologie Bd. 43 (1936), S. 299–301.
