= Mauricio Alonso =

Uruguayan footballer (born 1994)

Personal information
- Full name: Mauricio Sebastián Alonso Pereda
- Date of birth: 12 February 1994 (age 32)
- Place of birth: Montevideo, Uruguay
- Height: 1.71 m (5 ft 7 in)
- Position: Winger

Team information
- Current team: Universidad Católica
- Number: 32

Youth career
- Cerro

Senior career*
Years	Team	Apps	(Gls)
2011–2017	Cerro	74	(7)
2014–2015	→ Sud América (loan)	26	(1)
2016–2017	Villa Dálmine	32	(8)
2017	Lorca Deportiva	11	(1)
2018–2020	Deportivo Morón	20	(3)
2020–2021	Central Español	29	(6)
2022–2025	Mushuc Runa	73	(5)
2023	→ Guayaquil City (loan)	29	(1)
2025–	Universidad Católica	8	(3)
- * Club domestic league appearances and goals as of 18:24, 14 July 2022 (UTC)

Mauricio Sebastián Alonso Pereda (born 12 February 1994) is an Uruguayan footballer who plays for Universidad Católica as a winger.

== Club career ==
Born in Montevideo, Alonso represented Cerro as a youth. He made his senior debut on 14 August 2011, starting and scoring the last in a 3–1 home win against Cerrito for the Uruguayan Primera División championship.

On 24 August 2014, Alonso was loaned to fellow top tier club Sud América for one year. Upon returning, he featured rarely before moving to Primera B Nacional side Villa Dálmine in December 2015.

On 7 August 2017 Alonso switched clubs and countries again, after agreeing to a contract with Spanish Segunda División B side CF Lorca Deportiva.
