= Jeremías Pérez Tica =

Argentine footballer (born 2003)

Personal information
- Full name: Jeremías Leonel Pérez Tica
- Date of birth: 16 April 2003 (age 23)
- Place of birth: Funes, Santa Fe, Argentina
- Height: 1.69 m (5 ft 7 in)
- Position: Forward

Team information
- Current team: Delfín (on loan from Newell's Old Boys)
- Number: 18

Youth career
- Newell's Old Boys
- 2014–2017: Defensores de Funes
- 2018–2023: Newell's Old Boys

Senior career*
Years	Team	Apps	(Gls)
2023–	Newell's Old Boys	29	(0)
2025	→ Cerro Largo (loan)	5	(0)
2025–	→ Delfín (loan)	5	(1)

International career
2022–	Argentina U20	3	(0)
- * Club domestic league appearances and goals as of 17:56, 16 July 2025 (UTC)

Jeremías Leonel Pérez Tica (born 16 April 2003) is an Argentine footballer currently playing as a forward for Delfín, on loan from Newell's Old Boys.

== Club career ==
Born in Funes, Santa Fe, Pérez Tica began his career with Newell's Old Boys, but was released at the age of eleven for a lack of physical and technical ability. He spent four years with local neighbourhood side Defensores de Funes, before trialling with former club Newell's Old Boys in late 2017. He went on to return to Newell's Old Boys the following year, establishing himself in the youth ranks and being named on the bench in 2021. He signed his first professional contract with the club in September 2022.

He made his debut for Newell's Old Boys on 20 March 2023, coming on as a second-half substitute for Ramiro Sordo, before providing an assist for Jorge Recalde - the only goal in the 1–0 win.

== Career statistics ==
=== Club ===
As of 21 March 2023.

Appearances and goals by club, season and competition
Club	Season	League			Cup		Continental		Other		Total	
Club	Season	Division	Apps	Goals	Apps	Goals	Apps	Goals	Apps	Goals	Apps	Goals
Boca Juniors	2023	Argentine Primera División	1	0	0	0	–		0	0	1	0
Career total			1	0	0	0	0	0	0	0	1	0
