= Jeremias Friedrich Gülich =

- Born: 1733; Cannstatt, Germany
- Died: September 1803 (aged 70)
- Occupation: Dyer
- Spouse: Christina Hübner
- Children: Heinrich Gottlieb
- Father: Georg Marx Gülich

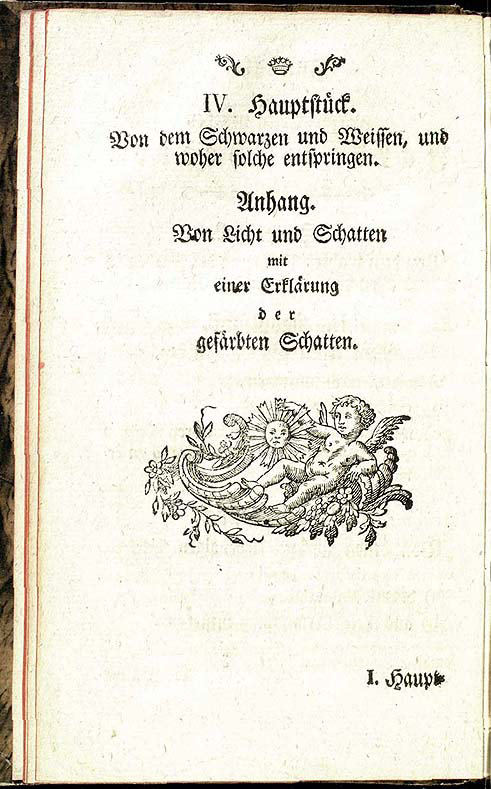
Title page of Jeremias' "Complete Dyeing and Bleaching Book"

Jeremias Friedrich Gülich (1733–1803) was a dyer in the neighbourhood of Stuttgart; he published the Complete Dyeing and Bleaching Book, an elaborate six-volume work on the technical details of dying. He made contributions in improving the body of scientific knowledge on colour. Johann Wolfgang von Goethe praised Jeremias' contribution to optics heavily in his book Theory of Colours. Although Jeremias and Goethe never conversed personally, Jeremias was very pleased to be praised by a figure so well known. Jeremias also helped to set industry standards on dying, most notably of sheep wool. After writing his books in Sindelfingen between the years 1776 and 1778, he ran a military orphanage in Ludwigsburg, where the boys spun cotton and the girls knitted and spun cotton and flax. In 1785, Jeremias opened his own cotton mill. By the end of his life he had become the sole supplier of clothing to the military and also opened a saltpeter and gunpowder factory.
