= 1978 Liga Deportiva Universitaria de Quito season =

L.D.U. Quito
1978 season
- President: Rodrigo Paz
- Manager: Vladislao Cap; Oscar Zubía; César Muñoz
- Stadium: Estadio Olímpico Atahualpa
- Serie A Serie B: 9th Runner-up
- Copa Libertadores: First Stage
Home colours	Away colours

Liga Deportiva Universitaria de Quito's 1978 season was the club's 48th year of existence, the 25th year in professional football, the 18th in the top level of professional football in Ecuador and the second in the Serie B.

== Squad ==
No.	Pos.	Nation	Player
—	GK	ECU	Adolfo Bolaños
—	GK	ECU	Patricio Gallardo
—	GK	ARG	Mario Quiroga
—	DF	URU	Luis De Carlos
—	DF	ECU	Alfredo Encalada
—	DF	ECU	Ángel Granja
—	DF	ECU	Mauricio King
—	DF	ECU	Marco Moreno
—	DF	ECU	Andrés Nazareno
—	DF	ECU	Fernando Villena
—	DF	ECU	Patricio Maldonado
—	MF	ECU	Fabián Cáceres
—	MF	ECU	Polo Carrera (captain)

No.	Pos.	Nation	Player
—	MF	ECU	Patricio Moscoso
—	MF	ARG	Francisco Rivadero
—	MF	ECU	Fabián Sandoval
—	MF	ECU	Roberto Sussman
—	MF	ECU	Jorge Tapia
—	MF	ECU	José Vélez
—	MF	ECU	Juan Yánez
—	FW	ECU	Gonzalo Castañeda
—	FW	ECU	José Cruz
—	FW	ARG	Óscar Palavecino
—	FW	ECU	Segundo Rodríguez
—	FW	ECU	Hernán Vaca

== Competitions ==
=== Serie A ===
==== First stage ====
Pos	Team	Pld	W	D	L	GF	GA	GD	Pts	Qualification or relegation
1	El Nacional	18	6	9	3	19	14	+5	21	Qualified to the Liguilla Final
2	Técico Universitario	18	7	6	5	22	21	+1	20	Qualified to the Liguilla Final
3	Emelec	18	6	7	5	31	23	+8	19	Qualified to the Liguilla Final
4	L.D.U. Portoviejo	18	6	7	5	27	24	+3	19	
5	Deportivo Quito	18	5	9	4	17	19	−2	19	
6	Deportivo Cuenca	18	6	6	6	15	17	−2	18	
7	Barcelona	18	6	5	7	20	20	0	17	
8	Universidad Católica	18	5	7	6	21	22	−1	17	
9	L.D.U. Quito	18	5	7	6	13	17	−4	17	Relegated to the Serie B
10	Manta Sport	18	5	3	10	21	29	−8	13	Relegated to the Serie B

===== Results =====
Home \ Away	BSC	CDC	SDQ	EN	CSE	LDP	LDQ	MSC	TU	UC
Barcelona							2–1			
Deportivo Cuenca							2–0			
Deportivo Quito							0–0			
El Nacional							0–0			
Emelec							0–0			
L.D.U. Portoviejo							2–1			
L.D.U. Quito	1–0	1–0	1–0	1–1	1–1	1–0		0–0	0–1	2–2
Manta Sport							1–2			
Técnico Universitario							2–1			
Universidad Católica							3–0			

Source: RSSSF
Legend: Blue = home team win; Yellow = draw; Red = away team win.

=== Serie B ===
==== Second stage ====
Pos	Team	Pld	W	D	L	GF	GA	GD	Pts	Promotion
1	América de Quito	22	13	5	4	64	30	+34	31	Champions and Promoted to the Serie A
2	L.D.U. Quito	22	10	9	3	42	17	+25	29	Promoted to the Serie A
3	L.D.U. Cuenca	22	10	9	3	35	17	+18	29	
4	Audaz Octubrino	22	12	5	5	37	31	+6	29	
5	9 de Octubre	22	8	7	7	27	34	−7	23	
6	Aucas	22	7	8	7	29	22	+7	22	
7	Olmedo	22	8	5	9	36	35	+1	21	
8	Manta Sport	22	5	9	8	25	30	−5	19	
9	Everest	22	5	7	10	24	33	−9	17	
10	Deportivo Quevedo	22	5	7	10	17	31	−14	17	
11	Luq San	22	5	4	13	17	41	−24	14	
12	Milagro	22	1	7	14	17	52	−35	9	

===== Results =====
Home \ Away	CDA	SDA	AO	CDQ	CDE	LDC	LDQ	LS	MSC	MIL	CDO	9DO
América de Quito							2–2					
Aucas							0–0					
Audaz Octubrino							1–0					
Deportivo Quevedo							1–1					
Everest							0–0					
L.D.U. Cuenca							1–1					
L.D.U. Quito	2–1	2–1	5–1	5–0	2–0	0–0		3–0	4–2	3–0	3–1	5–0
Luq San							2–1					
Manta Sport							1–1					
Milagro							1–1					
Olmedo							1–0					
9 de Octubre							1–1					

Source: RSSSF
Legend: Blue = home team win; Yellow = draw; Red = away team win.

=== Copa Libertadores ===
==== First stage ====
Group 1 standings
Pos	Team	Pld	W	D	L	GF	GA	GD	Pts	Qualification	(Argentina) RIV	(Argentina) IND	(Ecuador) LDQ	(Ecuador) EN
1	(Argentina) River Plate	6	2	4	0	7	1	+6	8	Qualified to the semi-finals	—	0–0	4–0	2–0
2	(Argentina) Independiente	6	3	2	1	6	2	+4	8		0–0	—	2–0	2–0
3	(Ecuador) LDU Quito	6	2	1	3	4	10	−6	5		0–0	1–0	—	3–2
4	(Ecuador) El Nacional	6	1	1	4	6	10	−4	3		1–1	1–2	2–0	—

Legend: Blue = home team win; Yellow = draw; Red = away team win.

June 27 First Stage	L.D.U. Quito (Ecuador)	1–0	(Argentina) Indepediente	Quito, Ecuador
	Palavecino 19'	Report		Stadium: Estadio Olímpico Atahualpa; Referee: Héctor Carvajal (Colombia)

June 30 First Stage	L.D.U. Quito (Ecuador)	0–0	(Argentina) River Plate	Quito, Ecuador
		Report		Stadium: Estadio Olímpico Atahualpa; Referee: Oscar Scolfaro (Brazil)

July 5 First Stage	El Nacional (Ecuador)	2–0	(Ecuador) L.D.U. Quito	Quito, Ecuador
	Correa 18', 76'	Report		Stadium: Estadio Olímpico Atahualpa; Referee: Enrique Labo Revoredo (Peru)

July 18 First Stage	River Plate (Argentina)	4–0	(Ecuador) L.D.U. Quito	Buenos Aires, Argentina
	Luque 60'; López 64'; Ortiz 68'; Saporiti 86'	Report		Stadium: Estadio Monumental Antonio Vespucio Liberti; Referee: Héctor Ortíz (Paraguay)

July 18 First Stage	Indepediente (Argentina)	2–0	(Ecuador) L.D.U. Quito	Avellaneda, Argentina
	Arrieta 23'; Bochini 56'	Report		Stadium: Estadio Libertadores de América; Referee: Mario Lira (Chile)

July 26 First Stage	L.D.U. Quito (Ecuador)	3–2	(Ecuador) El Nacional	Quito, Ecuador
	Carrera 22' (pen.), 29' (pen.); Cruz 80'	Report	Granda 31'; Escalante 89'	Stadium: Estadio Olímpico Atahualpa; Referee: Guillermo Velásquez (Colombia)
