= Gastón Acurio Velarde =

Peruvian civil engineer and politician (1930–2026)

- Acurio in 2018
- Born: 25 December 1930; Cusco, Peru
- Died: 7 September 2026 (aged 95); Lima, Peru
- Education: National University of Engineering
- Occupation: Politician

Gastón Rodrigo Acurio Velarde (Note: In this name that follows Hispanic American naming customs, the first or paternal surname is Acurio and the second or maternal family name is Velarde.) (25 December 1930 – 7 September 2026) was a Peruvian politician. He served as Minister of Development in 1965 to 1967 and was elected to the Senate three times. Between 1963 and 1965, he was the general secretary of the Popular Action party. He was the father of chef Gastón Acurio.

In 2011, to commemorate the 189th anniversary of the Peruvian parliament, it was announced that Acurio would be given the Congressional Medal of Honor.

== Early life and education ==
Gastón Rodrigo Acurio Velarde was born in Cusco on 25 December 1930, to parents Rómulo Acurio de Olarte and Hortencia Velarde Valencia. He attended the National School of Sciences and Arts of Cuzco and, subsequently, the National University of Engineering. He graduated in 1953 with a degree in civil engineering.

== Personal life and death ==
Acurio was married to Jesusa Jaramillo Rázuri; the couple had five children, including the chef Gastón Acurio.

Acurio died in Lima on 7 September 2026, at the age of 95.
