= Acurio =

Acurio is a surname of Basque origin.

== People with the surname ==
- Gastón Acurio Jaramillo (born 1967), Peruvian chef
- Gastón Acurio Velarde (1930–2026), Peruvian politician
- Jhon Acurio (born 2007), Ecuadorian footballer
- Jorge Acurio Tito (born 1963), governor of Cuzco in 2011–2013
- Víctor Acurio (born 2005), Peruvian actor, starred in Heart of the Wolf

== See also ==
- Akurio (disambiguation)
