= Jhon Acurio =

Ecuadorian footballer (born 2007)

Personal information
- Full name: Jhon Neid Acurio Ramírez
- Date of birth: 18 January 2007 (age 19)
- Place of birth: Babahoyo, Los Ríos, Ecuador
- Height: 1.78 m (5 ft 10 in)
- Position: Forward

Team information
- Current team: Tijuana

Youth career
- 2018–2023: Barcelona de Guayaquil

Senior career*
Years	Team	Apps	(Gls)
2023–2025	Barcelona de Guayaquil	1	(0)
2024	→ Cuniburo (loan)	3	(0)
2025	→ Chacaritas (loan)	9	(1)
2025	→ Sinaloa (loan)	3	(0)
2026–	Tijuana	0	(0)

International career
2023	Ecuador U17	5	(0)
- * Club domestic league appearances and goals as of 05:00, 15 October 2026 (UTC)

Jhon Neid Acurio Ramírez (born 18 January 2007) is an Ecuadorian footballer who plays as a forward for Mexican club Tijuana.

== Club career ==
Born in Babahoyo in the Los Ríos Province of Ecuador, Acurio joined the academy of Barcelona de Guayaquil at the age of eleven. He was drafted in to the Barcelona de Guayaquil first-team squad for the first time in May 2023, with manager Fabián Bustos stating that he could hopefully give Acurio and youth teammate Allen Obando minutes in the Ecuadorian Serie A. He went on to make his professional debut later in the same month, coming on as a second-half substitute for Argentine Francisco Fydriszewski in a 4–1 loss to El Nacional on 29 May. Having not featured again in the season, he was called up to the first team squad to train in October 2023, following his snub from the Ecuadorian under-17 team for the Under-17 World Cup.

Acurio spent the 2024 season on loan with Cuniburo, where he made three appearances in the Ecuadorian Serie B. The following season he was registered to play for fellow Serie B club Chacaritas, alongside Barcelona teammates Juan Usma and Andrés Viteri. He spent the second half of 2025 on another loan, this time with Mexican Liga de Expansión MX club Sinaloa.

== International career ==
Acurio was called up to the Ecuadorian under-17 side for the 2023 South American U-17 Championship. Having won their first game of the final hexagonal, a 3–1 win against Paraguay, Acurio stated that "it was important to start winning", and that the team were "all a family" and "very united".

He was a surprise omission from the Ecuador squad for the 2023 FIFA U-17 World Cup, with manager Diego Martínez stating that he had to "make some leaps" and "improve some things" before being in consideration for selection. Moments after the squad list was announced, Acurio posted three emojis on his personal Instagram account; a laughing face, a facepalm and a clown, seemingly in response to being left out of the squad.

== Career statistics ==
=== Club ===
As of 19 October 2026.

Appearances and goals by club, season and competition
Club	Season	League			Cup		Continental		Other		Total	
Club	Season	Division	Apps	Goals	Apps	Goals	Apps	Goals	Apps	Goals	Apps	Goals
Barcelona de Guayaquil	2023	Ecuadorian Serie A	1	0	0	0	0	0	0	0	1	0
Barcelona de Guayaquil	2024	Ecuadorian Serie A	0	0	0	0	0	0	0	0	0	0
Barcelona de Guayaquil	2025	Ecuadorian Serie A	0	0	0	0	0	0	0	0	0	0
Barcelona de Guayaquil	Total		1	0	0	0	0	0	0	0	1	0
Cuniburo (loan)	2024	Ecuadorian Serie B	3	0	0	0	–		0	0	3	0
Chacaritas (loan)	2025	Ecuadorian Serie B	9	1	0	0	–		0	0	9	1
Sinaloa (loan)	2025–26	Liga de Expansión MX	3	0	0	0	–		0	0	3	0
Tijuana	2026–27	Liga MX	0	0	0	0	–		0	0	0	0
Career total			16	1	0	0	0	0	0	0	16	1
