= 2022 Segunda Categoría =

Ascenso Nacional
- Season: 2022
- Dates: 10 September – 19 November 2022
- Champions: Cuniburo
- Promoted: Cuniburo; Vargas Torres
- Matches: 122
- Goals: 318 (2.61 per match)
- All statistics correct as of 13 November 2022.

The 2022 Campeonato Ecuatoriano de Fútbol Segunda Categoría, officially known as the 2022 Ascenso Nacional, is the 49th season of the Segunda Categoría, Ecuador's third tier football league. The season began on 15 March with the provincial stage, the national stage began on 10 September and ended on 19 November 2022.

Cuniburo won their first ever title after defeating Vargas Torres on penalties, after a 0–0 draw in the final.

== Qualified teams ==
The following list shows the teams that qualified for the National Stage.

Association	Team	Qualification method
(Azuay Province) Azuay; 5 berths	AVICED	2022 Segunda Categoría de Azuay champions
(Azuay Province) Azuay; 5 berths	Estrella Roja	2022 Segunda Categoría de Azuay runners-up
(Azuay Province) Azuay; 5 berths	Cuenca	2022 Segunda Categoría de Azuay 3rd place
(Azuay Province) Azuay; 5 berths	L.D.U. Cuenca	2022 Segunda Categoría de Azuay 4th place
(Azuay Province) Azuay; 5 berths	Baldor Bermeo Cabrera	2022 Segunda Categoría de Azuay 5th place
Bolívar; 3 berths	Unibolívar	2022 Segunda Categoría de Bolívar champions
Bolívar; 3 berths	Mineros	2022 Segunda Categoría de Bolívar runners-up
Bolívar; 3 berths	Atlético El Conde	2022 Segunda Categoría de Bolívar 3rd place
(Cañar Province) Cañar; 3 berths (Note: The champion and fourth place did not meet the requirements established by the FEF, therefore the places in the play-offs for the province of Cañar were assigned to the three best placed in the provincial championship.)	D' León	2022 Segunda Categoría de Cañar runners-up
(Cañar Province) Cañar; 3 berths	Ciudadelas del Norte	2022 Segunda Categoría de Cañar 3rd place
(Cañar Province) Cañar; 3 berths	Independiente Azogues	2022 Segunda Categoría de Cañar 5th place
(Carchi Province) Carchi; 2 berths	Dunamis 04	2022 Segunda Categoría de Carchi champions
(Carchi Province) Carchi; 2 berths	Ciudad de Tulcán	2022 Segunda Categoría de Carchi runners-up
(Chimborazo Province) Chimborazo; 1 berth (Note: The champion and runner-up did not present the updated statutes as professional teams on time, therefore the place in the play-offs for the province of Chimborazo was assigned to the team that finished in third place in the provincial championship.)	Independiente San Pedro	2022 Segunda Categoría de Chimborazo 3rd place
(Cotopaxi Province) Cotopaxi; 3 berths	La Unión	2022 Segunda Categoría de Cotopaxi champions
(Cotopaxi Province) Cotopaxi; 3 berths	Latacunga City	2022 Segunda Categoría de Cotopaxi runners-up
(Cotopaxi Province) Cotopaxi; 3 berths	Atlético Kin	2022 Segunda Categoría de Cotopaxi 3rd place
(El Oro Province) El Oro; 3 berths	Bonita Bonita	2022 Segunda Categoría de El Oro champions
(El Oro Province) El Oro; 3 berths	Santos	2022 Segunda Categoría de El Oro runners-up
(El Oro Province) El Oro; 3 berths	Audaz Octubrino	2022 Segunda Categoría de El Oro 3rd place
(Esmeraldas Province) Esmeraldas; 3 berths	Vargas Torres	2022 Segunda Categoría de Esmeraldas champions
(Esmeraldas Province) Esmeraldas; 3 berths	Atacames	2022 Segunda Categoría de Esmeraldas runners-up
(Esmeraldas Province) Esmeraldas; 3 berths	5 de Agosto	2022 Segunda Categoría de Esmeraldas 3rd place
(Guayas Province) Guayas; 6 berths	Atlético Samborondón	2022 Segunda Categoría de Guayas champions
(Guayas Province) Guayas; 6 berths	Filanbanco	2022 Segunda Categoría de Guayas runners-up
(Guayas Province) Guayas; 6 berths	Toreros	2022 Segunda Categoría de Guayas 3rd place
(Guayas Province) Guayas; 6 berths	Patria	2022 Segunda Categoría de Guayas 4th place
(Guayas Province) Guayas; 6 berths	Rocafuerte	2022 Segunda Categoría de Guayas 5th place
(Guayas Province) Guayas; 6 berths	Atlético Daule	2022 Segunda Categoría de Guayas 6th place
(Imbabura Province) Imbabura; 3 berths	Leones del Norte	2022 Segunda Categoría de Imbabura champions
(Imbabura Province) Imbabura; 3 berths	San Antonio	2022 Segunda Categoría de Imbabura runners-up
(Imbabura Province) Imbabura; 3 berths	Santa Fe	2022 Segunda Categoría de Imbabura 3rd place
(Loja Province) Loja; 2 berths	Atlético Zamora	2022 Segunda Categoría de Loja champions
(Loja Province) Loja; 2 berths	Loja Federal	2022 Segunda Categoría de Loja runners-up
(Los Ríos Province) Los Ríos; 4 berths	Río Babahoyo	2022 Segunda Categoría de Los Ríos champions
(Los Ríos Province) Los Ríos; 4 berths	Insutec	2022 Segunda Categoría de Los Ríos runners-up
(Los Ríos Province) Los Ríos; 4 berths	Montry	2022 Segunda Categoría de Los Ríos 3rd place
(Los Ríos Province) Los Ríos; 4 berths	San Camilo	2022 Segunda Categoría de Los Ríos 4th place
(Manabí Province) Manabí; 5 berths	Grecia	2022 Segunda Categoría de Manabí champions
(Manabí Province) Manabí; 5 berths	L.D.U. Portoviejo	2022 Segunda Categoría de Manabí runners-up
(Manabí Province) Manabí; 5 berths	Fijalán	2022 Segunda Categoría de Manabí 3rd place
(Manabí Province) Manabí; 5 berths	Juventud Italiana	2022 Segunda Categoría de Manabí 4th place
(Manabí Province) Manabí; 5 berths	Malecón de Santa Ana	2022 Segunda Categoría de Manabí 5th place
(Orellana Province) Orellana; 2 berths	Orellanense	2022 Segunda Categoría de Orellana champions
(Orellana Province) Orellana; 2 berths	Sacha Petrolero	2022 Segunda Categoría de Orellana runners-up
(Pastaza Province) Pastaza; 1 berth	Danubio	2022 Segunda Categoría de Pastaza champions
(Pichincha Province) Pichincha; 5 berths	AAMPETRA	2022 Segunda Categoría de Pichincha champions
(Pichincha Province) Pichincha; 5 berths	Deportivo Quito	2022 Segunda Categoría de Pichincha runners-up
(Pichincha Province) Pichincha; 5 berths	Cuniburo	2022 Segunda Categoría de Pichincha 3rd place
(Pichincha Province) Pichincha; 5 berths	Miguel Iturralde	2022 Segunda Categoría de Pichincha 4th place
(Pichincha Province) Pichincha; 5 berths	ESPOLI	2022 Segunda Categoría de Pichincha 5th place
(Santa Elena Province) Santa Elena; 4 berths	Huancavilca	2022 Segunda Categoría de Santa Elena champions
(Santa Elena Province) Santa Elena; 4 berths	Atlético Porteño	2022 Segunda Categoría de Santa Elena runners-up
(Santa Elena Province) Santa Elena; 4 berths	Ecuador	2022 Segunda Categoría de Santa Elena 3rd place
(Santa Elena Province) Santa Elena; 4 berths	Atlético Espartanos	2022 Segunda Categoría de Santa Elena 4th place
(Santo Domingo de los Tsáchilas Province) Santo Domingo de los Tsáchilas; 3 berths	3 de Julio	2022 Segunda Categoría de Santo Domingo de los Tsáchilas champions
(Santo Domingo de los Tsáchilas Province) Santo Domingo de los Tsáchilas; 3 berths	La Concordia	2022 Segunda Categoría de Santo Domingo de los Tsáchilas runners-up
(Santo Domingo de los Tsáchilas Province) Santo Domingo de los Tsáchilas; 3 berths	San Rafael	2022 Segunda Categoría de Santo Domingo de los Tsáchilas 3rd place
(Sucumbíos Province) Sucumbíos; 2 berths	Unión Manabita	2022 Segunda Categoría de Sucumbíos champions
(Sucumbíos Province) Sucumbíos; 2 berths	Caribe Junior	2022 Segunda Categoría de Sucumbíos runners-up
(Tungurahua Province) Tungurahua; 2 berths	Baños Ciudad de Fuego	2022 Segunda Categoría de Tungurahua champions
(Tungurahua Province) Tungurahua; 2 berths	Santiago de Píllaro	2022 Segunda Categoría de Tungurahua runners-up
(Zamora-Chinchipe Province) Zamora Chinchipe; 2 berths	Primero de Mayo	2022 Segunda Categoría de Zamora Chinchipe champions
(Zamora-Chinchipe Province) Zamora Chinchipe; 2 berths	Ecuagenera	2022 Segunda Categoría de Zamora Chinchipe runners-up

== Format ==
The competition is a single-elimination tournament, from the first round to the semi-finals are played as a two-legged ties, the final is played as a single match in neutral venue. All sixty four teams enter in the first round, order is decided by draw.

== Schedule ==
The schedule of the competition is as follows:

Stage	First leg	Second leg
First round	10–12 September	16–18 September
Second round	23–28 September	30 September–2 October
Round of 16	7–9 October	14–16 October
Quarter-finals	21–23 October	28–30 October
Semi-finals	4–6 November	11–13 November
Final	19 November (Quevedo)	

== First round ==
The draw for the first round was held on 5 September 2022, 16:00 at FEF headquarters in Guayaquil. In a first draw, the 32 teams, seeded by their FEF ranking, were drawn into 16 ties. The home and away teams of each leg were decided in a second draw. The first legs were played on 10–12 September and the second legs were played on 16–18 September 2022.

Team 1	Agg.	Team 2	1st leg	2nd leg
Latacunga City (Cotopaxi Province)	0–3	(Guayas Province) Filanbanco	0–3	w/o
Orellanense (Orellana Province)	3–4	(El Oro Province) Audaz Octubrino	3–1	0–3
San Rafael (Santo Domingo de los Tsáchilas Province)	4–1	(Esmeraldas Province) Atacames	1–0	3–1
Montry (Los Ríos Province)	2–3	(Guayas Province) Toreros	1–1	1–2
Santiago de Píllaro (Tungurahua Province)	0–8	Mineros	0–3	0–5
Atlético Espartanos (Santa Elena Province)	2–6	(Imbabura Province) Leones del Norte	2–1	0–5
L.D.U. Portoviejo (Manabí Province)	2–2 (4–3 p)	(Zamora-Chinchipe Province) Primero de Mayo	0–1	2–1
Sacha Petrolero (Orellana Province)	2–9	(Azuay Province) Baldor Bermeo Cabrera	1–4	1–5
Loja Federal (Loja Province)	0–3	(Chimborazo Province) Independiente San Pedro	0–3	w/o
Santos (El Oro Province)	1–5	(Santa Elena Province) Huancavilca	1–3	0–2
Atlético El Conde	1–12	(Cotopaxi Province) La Unión	0–4	1–8
Atlético Daule (Guayas Province)	3–2	(Azuay Province) L.D.U. Cuenca	3–2	0–0
Cuenca (Azuay Province)	5–0	(Pastaza Province) Danubio	5–0	w/o
Caribe Junior (Sucumbíos Province)	1–3	(Loja Province) Atlético Zamora	1–0	0–3
Atlético Porteño (Santa Elena Province)	3–6	(Guayas Province) Atlético Samborondón	2–3	1–3
Ciudad de Tulcán (Carchi Province)	1–4	(Los Ríos Province) Insutec	1–1	0–3
Baños Ciudad de Fuego (Tungurahua Province)	3–4	(Zamora-Chinchipe Province) Ecuagenera	2–1	1–3
Ciudadelas del Norte (Cañar Province)	0–1	(Los Ríos Province) Río Babahoyo	0–1	0–0
Deportivo Quito (Pichincha Province)	3–2	(Carchi Province) Dunamis 04	1–1	2–1
Rocafuerte (Guayas Province)	4–0	(El Oro Province) Bonita Bonita	1–0	3–0
ESPOLI (Pichincha Province)	1–1 (4–5 p)	(Manabí Province) Grecia	1–0	0–1
Miguel Iturralde (Pichincha Province)	0–2	(Santo Domingo de los Tsáchilas Province) 3 de Julio	0–1	0–1
Santa Fe (Imbabura Province)	3–0	(Santa Elena Province) Ecuador	0–0	3–0
Patria (Guayas Province)	1–2	(Esmeraldas Province) Vargas Torres	1–0	0–2
5 de Agosto (Esmeraldas Province)	0–2	Unibolívar	0–0	0–2
Fijalán (Manabí Province)	0–3	(Imbabura Province) San Antonio	0–2	0–1
Unión Manabita (Sucumbíos Province)	1–6	(Manabí Province) Juventud Italiana	1–2	0–4
Atlético Kin (Cotopaxi Province)	1–7	(Azuay Province) AVICED	1–5	0–2
San Camilo (Los Ríos Province)	2–7	(Cañar Province) D' León	2–3	0–4
Independiente Azogues (Cañar Province)	2–3	(Pichincha Province) Cuniburo	1–1	1–2
Malecón de Santa Ana (Manabí Province)	0–6	(Pichincha Province) AAMPETRA	0–0	0–6
La Concordia (Santo Domingo de los Tsáchilas Province)	3–0	(Azuay Province) Estrella Roja	2–0	1–0

== Second round ==
The draw for the second round was held on 19 September 2022, 16:00 at FEF headquarters in Guayaquil. In a first draw, the 16 teams, seeded by their FEF ranking, were drawn into 8 ties. The home and away teams of each leg were decided in a second draw. The first legs were played on 23–28 September and the second legs were played on 30 September–2 October 2022.

Team 1	Agg.	Team 2	1st leg	2nd leg
Atlético Daule (Guayas Province)	1–6	(Pichincha Province) Cuniburo	0–1	1–5
Río Babahoyo (Los Ríos Province)	3–1	(Cotopaxi Province) La Unión	3–0	0–1
Baldor Bermeo Cabrera (Azuay Province)	3–2	(Imbabura Province) Leones del Norte	2–1	1–1
Deportivo Quito (Pichincha Province)	2–0	(Chimborazo Province) Independiente San Pedro	0–0	2–0
La Concordia (Santo Domingo de los Tsáchilas Province)	2–2 (3–4 p)	Unibolívar	1–0	1–2
San Rafael (Santo Domingo de los Tsáchilas Province)	0–6	(Imbabura Province) San Antonio	0–3	0–3
Ecuagenera (Zamora-Chinchipe Province)	3–6	Mineros	1–1	2–5
D' León (Cañar Province)	4–3	(Guayas Province) Filanbanco	0–1	4–2
3 de Julio (Santo Domingo de los Tsáchilas Province)	3–3 (2–4 p)	(Santa Elena Province) Huancavilca	2–1	1–2
AAMPETRA (Pichincha Province)	3–2	(Los Ríos Province) Insutec	2–1	1–1
L.D.U. Portoviejo (Manabí Province)	1–1 (5–3 p)	(Guayas Province) Rocafuerte	0–1	1–0
Audaz Octubrino (El Oro Province)	0–7	(Azuay Province) AVICED	0–3	0–4
Juventud Italiana (Manabí Province)	4–2	(Loja Province) Atlético Zamora	2–1	2–1
Toreros (Guayas Province)	0–2	(Esmeraldas Province) Vargas Torres	0–0	0–2
Santa Fe (Imbabura Province)	2–5	(Guayas Province) Atlético Samborondón	1–2	1–3
Cuenca (Azuay Province)	3–4	(Manabí Province) Grecia	2–1	1–3

== Final rounds ==
In the final rounds, each tie will be played on a home-and-away two-legged basis. If the aggregate score is level, the second-leg match will go straight to the penalty shoot-out to determine the winners.

=== Bracket ===
Round of 16
(Pichincha Province) Cuniburo	2	0	2 (6)
(Los Ríos Province) Río Babahoyo	0	2	2 (5)
(Azuay Province) Baldor Bermeo Cabrera	2	0	2 (3)
(Pichincha Province) Deportivo Quito	2	0	2 (2)
Unibolívar	0	1	1
(Imbabura Province) San Antonio	0	2	2
Mineros	1	3	4
(Cañar Province) D' León	1	0	1
(Santa Elena Province) Huancavilca	1	0	1
(Pichincha Province) AAMPETRA	1	2	3
(Azuay Province) AVICED	1	3	4
(Manabí Province) L.D.U. Portoviejo	2	0	2
(Manabí Province) Juventud Italiana	2	0	2
(Esmeraldas Province) Vargas Torres	1	3	4
(Guayas Province) Atlético Samborondón	1	0	1
(Manabí Province) Grecia	1	1	2

Quarter-finals
(Pichincha Province) Cuniburo	4	2	6
(Azuay Province) Baldor Bermeo Cabrera	0	1	1
(Imbabura Province) San Antonio	0	3	3
Mineros	0	1	1
(Pichincha Province) AAMPETRA	1	0	1
(Azuay Province) AVICED	1	2	3
(Esmeraldas Province) Vargas Torres	2	2	4
(Manabí Province) Grecia	2	0	2

Semi-finals
(Pichincha Province) Cuniburo	3	1	4
(Imbabura Province) San Antonio	3	0	3
(Azuay Province) AVICED	0	0	0 (2)
(Esmeraldas Province) Vargas Torres	0	0	0 (3)

Final
(Pichincha Province) Cuniburo	0 (4)
(Esmeraldas Province) Vargas Torres	0 (3)

1. ^{†} Order to be decided.

=== Round of 16 ===
The first legs were played on 7–9 October and the second legs were played on 14–16 October 2022.

Team 1	Agg.	Team 2	1st leg	2nd leg
Cuniburo (Pichincha Province)	2–2 (6–5 p)	(Los Ríos Province) Río Babahoyo	2–0	0–2
Baldor Bermeo Cabrera (Azuay Province)	2–2 (3–2 p)	(Pichincha Province) Deportivo Quito	2–2	0–0
Unibolívar	1–2	(Imbabura Province) San Antonio	0–0	1–2
Mineros	4–1	(Cañar Province) D' León	1–1	3–0
Huancavilca (Santa Elena Province)	1–3	(Pichincha Province) AAMPETRA	1–1	0–2
AVICED (Azuay Province)	4–2	(Manabí Province) L.D.U. Portoviejo	1–2	3–0
Juventud Italiana (Manabí Province)	2–4	(Esmeraldas Province) Vargas Torres	2–1	0–3
Atlético Samborondón (Guayas Province)	1–2	(Manabí Province) Grecia	1–1	0–1

=== Quarter-finals ===
The first legs were played on 21–25 October and the second legs were played on 29–30 October 2022.

Team 1	Agg.	Team 2	1st leg	2nd leg
Cuniburo (Pichincha Province)	6–1	(Azuay Province) Baldor Bermeo Cabrera	4–0	2–1
Mineros	1–3	(Imbabura Province) San Antonio	0–0	1–3
AAMPETRA (Pichincha Province)	1–3	(Azuay Province) AVICED	1–1	0–2
Vargas Torres (Esmeraldas Province)	4–2	(Manabí Province) Grecia	2–2	2–0

=== Semi-finals ===
The first legs were played on 5–6 November and the second legs were played on 12–13 November 2022. Winners were promoted to 2023 Ecuadorian Serie B.

Team 1	Agg.	Team 2	1st leg	2nd leg
Cuniburo (Pichincha Province)	4–3	(Imbabura Province) San Antonio	3–3	1–0
AVICED (Azuay Province)	0–0 (2–3 p)	(Esmeraldas Province) Vargas Torres	0–0	0–0

=== Final ===
The final will be played in November 2022 at Estadio 7 de Octubre in Quevedo.

19 November 2022
15:00 UTC−5

Vargas Torres (Esmeraldas Province)	0–0	(Pichincha Province) Cuniburo
Penalties
	3–4

Estadio 7 de Octubre, Quevedo

== See also ==
- 2022 Ecuadorian Serie A
- 2022 Ecuadorian Serie B
- 2022 Copa Ecuador
