= Patricio Lara =

Argentine football manager (born 1956)

Personal information
- Full name: Patricio Antonio Lara Giorgetti
- Date of birth: 15 August 1956 (age 70)
- Place of birth: Quilmes, Argentina
- Height: 1.82 m (6 ft 0 in)

Managerial career
- Years: Team
- 1983–1985: Argentino de Quilmes (youth)
- 1985: Argentino de Quilmes
- 1985: San Telmo
- 1986: Almirante Brown
- 1987–1990: Cosme Argerich
- 1991: San Bernardo
- 1992: Cosme Argerich
- 1993: Quilmes
- 1996: Independiente MDP
- 1997–1998: Atlético Tucumán (youth)
- 1999: Chacarita Juniors (youth)
- 2000: Cosme Argerich
- 2002: Audaz Octubrino
- 2003: Estudiantes de Cuenca
- 2003: Deportivo Cuenca (youth)
- 2003: Deportivo Cuenca
- 2004: Deportivo Cuenca (assistant)
- 2004–2005: Emelec (assistant)
- 2005: Deportivo Cuenca
- 2006: LDU Loja
- 2007: Deportivo Azogues
- 2008: LDU Cuenca
- 2009: Tecni Club
- 2010: Universidad Católica del Ecuador
- 2010–2012: Universidad Católica del Ecuador (assistant)
- 2013: Deportivo Azogues
- 2013–2017: Universidad Católica del Ecuador (assistant)
- 2017: Universidad Católica del Ecuador (interim)
- 2017–2020: Ecuador U20 (assistant)
- 2017–2018: Ecuador (assistant)
- 2019–2020: Ecuador (assistant)
- 2020–2021: Orense
- 2022: Atlético Santo Domingo

Patricio Antonio Lara Giorgetti (born 15 August 1956) is an Argentine football manager.

== Career ==
Lara was born in Quilmes. After starting his career with hometown side Argentino de Quilmes' youth setup in 1983, he managed a number of teams in his home country (notably Atlético Tucumán in 1997 and 1998) before moving to Ecuador in 2002, as manager of Audaz Octubrino.

Lara was subsequently in charge of Estudiantes de Cuenca in the 2003 campaign before moving to Deportivo Cuenca; initially appointed to the youth setup, he was named interim manager for the latter stages of the competition. For the 2004 season, he was Julio Asad's assistant at Cuenca before joining Emelec, also an assistant.

Lara returned to Deportivo Cuenca in 2005, where he was initially a youth football coordinator before returning to the manager role. In the following four seasons, he was in charge of Serie B sides LDU Loja, Deportivo Azogues, LDU Cuenca and Tecni Club, respectively.

In June 2010, Lara was named manager of Universidad Católica. He resigned on 19 September, but was appointed assistant after the arrival of Jorge Célico.

In December 2012, Lara returned to Deportivo Azogues, but resigned the following May. He subsequently returned to work with Célico as an assistant at Universidad Católica, before being named interim of the club in July 2017, as Célico left for the Ecuador national team; after the appointment of Gustavo Díaz, Lara joined Célico's staff.

On 2 September 2020, Lara was presented as manager of Orense.
