= 2022 Ecuadorian Serie B =

LigaPro Serie B
- Season: 2022
- Dates: 15 March – 30 October 2022
- Champions: El Nacional (2nd title)
- Promoted: El Nacional; Libertad
- Relegated: Atlético Santo Domingo; Olmedo
- Matches: 180
- Goals: 384 (2.13 per match)
- Top goalscorer: Ronie Carrillo (16 goals)
- Biggest home win: El Nacional 5–0 Imbabura (13 September)
- Biggest away win: Olmedo 0–4 Imbabura (7 July); América de Quito 0–4 Independiente Juniors (30 July)
- Highest scoring: Libertad 3–5 Imbabura (31 March)
- All statistics correct as of 30 October 2022.

The 2022 Campeonato Ecuatoriano de Fútbol Serie B, known as the LigaPro Betcris Serie B 2022 for sponsoring purposes, was the 64th season of the Serie B, Ecuador's second tier football league, and the fourth under the management of the Liga Profesional de Fútbol del Ecuador (or LigaPro). The season began on 15 March and ended on 30 October 2022.

== Teams ==
10 teams competed in the season. LDU Portoviejo and Atlético Porteño were relegated after finishing in the bottom two places of the aggregate table of the previous season, being replaced by the 2021 Segunda Categoría champions Libertad and runners-up Imbabura. Manta and Olmedo were relegated after finishing in the bottom two places of the aggregate table of the 2021 Serie A.

=== Team changes ===
Promoted from 2021 Segunda Categoría	Relegated from 2021 Serie A	Promoted to 2022 Serie A	Relegated to 2022 Segunda Categoría
Libertad; Imbabura	Manta; Olmedo	Cumbayá; Gualaceo	LDU Portoviejo; Atlético Porteño

=== Stadiums and locations ===
Locations of the 2022 Serie B clubs.

Club	City	Stadium	Capacity
América de Quito	Quito	Olímpico Atahualpa	38,258
Atlético Santo Domingo	Santo Domingo	Etho Vega Baquero	10,172
Búhos ULVR	Guayaquil	Modelo Alberto Spencer Herrera	42,000
Chacaritas	Pelileo	Ciudad de Pelileo	8,000
El Nacional	Quito	Olímpico Atahualpa	38,258
Imbabura	Ibarra	Olímpico Ciudad de Ibarra	18,600
Independiente Juniors	Sangolquí	Banco Guayaquil	12,000
Libertad	Loja	Federativo Reina del Cisne	14,935
Manta	Manta	Jocay	20,000
Olmedo	Riobamba	Fernando Guerrero	14,000

=== Personnel and kits ===
Team	Manager	Kit manufacturer	Shirt sponsor
América de Quito	(Colombia) Samy Ariza	Boman	—
Atlético Santo Domingo	(Argentina) Patricio Lara	Yeliyan	Constructora Wilson Erazo; PipBowling
Búhos ULVR	(Uruguay) Matías Rosa	MB1	Universidad Vicente Rocafuerte
Chacaritas	(Ecuador) Joel Vernaza	Vaz Sport	San Francisco COAC Ltda.
El Nacional	(Paraguay) Ever Hugo Almeida	Lotto	ANDEC; Banco General Rumiñahui
Imbabura	(Ecuador) Joel Armas	Ortiz Design	Fábrica de Medias Gardenia
Independiente Juniors	(Ecuador) Miguel Bravo	Marathon Sports	Chery; Banco Guayaquil
Libertad	(Ecuador) Paúl Vélez	Jasa Evolution	Banco de Loja; Grand Aviation
Manta	(Argentina) Fabián Frías	Astro	Atún Isabel; BET593
Olmedo	(Uruguay) Eduardo Favaro	Reusch	Fibra Telecom

=== Managerial changes ===
Team	Outgoing manager	Manner of departure	Date of vacancy	Position in table	Incoming manager	Date of appointment
Chacaritas	(Argentina) Lorenzo Frutos	Sacked	26 February 2022	3rd	(Ecuador) Juan Carlos Ávila	5 April 2022
Manta	(Argentina) Pablo Trobbiani	Mutual agreement	8 April 2022	10th	(Argentina) Fabián Frías	15 April 2022
Atlético Santo Domingo	(Spain) Juan Carlos Caballero	Mutual agreement	7 May 2022	9th	(Ecuador) Jairo Portilla	8 May 2022
Atlético Santo Domingo	(Ecuador) Jairo Portilla	Mutual agreement	9 July 2022	9th	(Argentina) Patricio Lara	10 July 2022
Olmedo	(Ecuador) Héctor González	Mutual agreement	1 September 2022	8th	(Ecuador) Omar Ledesma (Note: Caretaker manager.)	2 September 2022
Olmedo	(Ecuador) Omar Ledesma	End of caretaker spell	18 September 2022	8th	(Uruguay) Eduardo Favaro	18 September 2022
Libertad	(Chile) Nelson Tapia	Sacked	22 September 2022	4th	(Ecuador) Paúl Vélez	22 September 2022
Chacaritas	(Ecuador) Juan Carlos Ávila	Resigned	27 September 2022	6th	(Ecuador) Joel Vernaza	1 October 2022

== League table ==
Pos	Team	Pld	W	D	L	GF	GA	GD	Pts	Promotion, qualification or relegation
1	El Nacional (C, P)	36	18	9	9	54	37	+17	63	Promotion to Serie A
2	Independiente Juniors (Note: Reserve teams were ineligible for promotion.)	36	15	11	10	44	33	+11	56	
3	Libertad (P)	36	15	11	10	42	38	+4	56	Promotion to Serie A
4	América de Quito	36	13	15	8	41	31	+10	54	
5	Imbabura	36	13	8	15	47	51	−4	47	
6	Chacaritas	36	11	10	15	30	38	−8	43	
7	Búhos ULVR	36	9	15	12	33	38	−5	42	
8	Manta	36	10	12	14	29	39	−10	42	
9	Atlético Santo Domingo (R)	36	9	12	15	31	36	−5	39	Relegation to Segunda Categoría
10	Olmedo (Note: Olmedo were deducted three points as punishment for failing to pay their creditors.) (R)	36	10	11	15	33	43	−10	38	Relegation to Segunda Categoría

Source: LigaPro
Rules for classification: 1) Points; 2) Goal difference; 3) Goals scored; 4) Away goals scored; 4) Head-to-head points; 5) Head-to-head goal difference; 6) Head-to-head away goals scored; 8) Draw.
(C) Champions; (P) Promoted; (R) Relegated

== Results ==
Home \ Away	AME	ASD	BUH	CHA	NAC	IMB	IND	LIB	MAN	OLM
América de Quito	—	0–0	1–2	1–1	2–0	1–0	4–0	4–0	1–0	0–0
América de Quito	—	0–0	0–0	2–2	1–1	0–0	0–4	2–1	1–1	1–0
Atlético Santo Domingo	4–0	—	1–1	0–0	1–1	1–0	0–1	0–0	2–0	1–2
Atlético Santo Domingo	2–2	—	2–1	3–1	1–2	1–0	0–2	1–0	2–0	2–0
Búhos ULVR	3–2	1–0	—	0–0	2–2	1–2	1–0	0–1	2–0	3–3
Búhos ULVR	0–0	1–1	—	1–1	0–1	2–2	0–0	0–0	2–1	1–2
Chacaritas	0–1	1–0	2–0	—	3–2	2–1	2–0	1–0	0–1	1–0
Chacaritas	0–2	3–0	1–0	—	0–2	1–0	0–1	1–2	0–0	0–0
El Nacional	1–0	2–0	2–1	2–0	—	2–4	2–1	3–0	1–0	1–1
El Nacional	0–1	0–0	3–1	2–0	—	5–0	1–1	4–2	1–0	1–1
Imbabura	1–2	2–0	0–1	0–2	2–1	—	3–2	1–2	0–0	0–0
Imbabura	2–1	3–1	1–1	1–0	3–2	—	1–3	2–1	0–0	1–0
Independiente Juniors	1–0	1–0	0–0	1–0	0–0	1–1	—	0–0	1–1	0–1
Independiente Juniors	1–1	1–0	3–2	1–1	4–1	4–1	—	0–1	2–2	1–0
Libertad	0–3 (Note: The match, which originally ended 4–2, was awarded 0–3 to América de Quito due to Libertad fielding the suspended player José Cortez.)	1–1	0–0	5–1	1–0	3–5	1–0	—	0–0	1–0
Libertad	1–1	2–1	0–1	1–0	1–1	2–0	2–2	—	0–0	2–1
Manta	1–1	2–1	0–1	1–1	0–1	3–2	0–2	0–3	—	2–1
Manta	1–0	0–0	2–0	3–1	0–1	1–0	1–2	2–2	—	2–1
Olmedo	1–1	1–1	2–1	1–1	2–1	0–4	1–0	0–2	1–2	—
Olmedo	0–2	2–1	0–0	1–0	1–2	2–2	2–1	0–2	3–0	—

Source: LigaPro
Legend: Blue = home team win; Yellow = draw; Red = away team win.

== Positions by round ==
To preserve chronological evolvements, any postponed matches were not included to the round at which they were originally scheduled, but added to the full round they were played immediately afterwards. For example, if a match was scheduled for round 7, but then played between rounds 8 and 9, it will be added to the standings for round 8.

Team ╲ Round	1	2	3	4	5	6	7	8	9	10	11	12	13	14	15	16	17	18	19	20	21	22	23	24	25	26	27	28	29	30	31	32	33	34	35	36
América de Quito	3	5	4	3	2	5	5	4	5	4	2	2	2	2	2	1	1	1	2	4	4	6	5	3	1	2	3	3	3	3	3	2	3	3	3	4
Atl. Santo Domingo	4	8	10	8	9	9	8	9	9	9	9	9	9	9	9	10	10	10	9	10	10	10	9	9	9	9	9	8	8	10	10	9	10	10	9	9
Búhos ULVR	9	10	7	9	6	8	9	8	8	7	6	6	7	6	7	5	3	5	6	6	7	7	6	7	7	7	7	7	7	7	7	7	7	7	7	7
Chacaritas	2	4	3	5	4	2	4	1	2	1	1	1	1	1	1	2	2	2	4	2	3	3	4	2	3	4	5	6	6	6	6	6	6	6	6	6
El Nacional	5	6	8	6	7	6	6	6	6	8	8	8	5	3	3	3	5	4	1	3	2	1	2	1	2	3	2	1	1	1	1	1	1	1	1	1
Imbabura	6	2	1	1	1	1	1	2	1	2	4	5	6	7	5	6	6	6	5	5	6	5	7	6	6	6	6	5	5	5	5	5	5	5	5	5
Independiente Juniors	7	3	5	2	5	4	3	3	4	3	5	7	8	8	8	8	8	8	8	7	5	4	1	4	4	1	1	2	2	2	2	3	2	2	2	2
Libertad	1	1	2	4	3	3	2	5	3	5	7	4	4	5	4	4	4	3	3	1	1	2	3	5	5	5	4	4	4	4	4	4	4	4	4	3
Manta	8	7	9	10	10	10	10	10	10	10	10	10	10	10	10	9	9	9	10	9	9	9	10	10	10	10	10	10	9	9	8	8	8	8	8	8
Olmedo	10	9	6	7	8	7	7	7	7	6	3	3	3	4	6	7	7	7	7	8	8	8	8	8	8	8	8	9	10	8	9	10	9	9	10	10

Leader and promotion to Serie A
Promotion to Serie A
Relegation to Segunda Categoría

Source: LigaPro

== Results by match played ==
Team ╲ Round	1	2	3	4	5	6	7	8	9	10	11	12	13	14	15	16	17	18	19	20	21	22	23	24	25	26	27	28	29	30	31	32	33	34	35	36
América de Quito	D	D	W	D	W	L	D	W	L	W	W	D	L	W	W	W	L	L	L	L	D	L	W	W	W	D	D	D	W	D	D	W	D	D	D	D
Atl. Santo Domingo	D	L	L	W	L	D	D	L	L	L	W	L	D	D	L	D	D	W	W	L	L	D	W	L	W	D	D	W	L	L	L	W	L	D	W	D
Búhos ULVR	L	L	W	L	W	L	L	D	W	W	W	D	D	D	D	W	W	D	L	L	L	W	W	L	D	D	D	D	L	D	L	D	D	L	D	D
Chacaritas	W	L	W	L	W	W	D	W	D	W	L	W	D	W	L	D	L	D	L	W	D	D	L	W	D	D	L	L	L	L	W	D	L	L	L	L
El Nacional	D	D	L	W	L	W	D	W	L	L	W	D	W	W	W	L	L	W	W	D	W	D	L	W	L	D	W	W	W	W	D	W	D	W	L	W
Imbabura	D	W	W	W	W	L	D	L	W	L	L	L	D	L	W	L	W	L	W	L	D	W	D	W	D	L	L	W	L	D	W	L	D	L	W	L
Independiente Juniors	D	W	L	W	L	W	W	D	L	W	L	L	D	L	D	L	D	L	W	W	W	W	W	D	D	W	W	D	W	D	D	L	W	W	L	D
Libertad	W	W	L	L	W	D	W	L	W	L	L	W	D	D	D	W	D	W	L	W	W	L	L	D	D	D	W	L	W	D	D	W	D	L	W	W
Manta	D	D	L	L	L	L	L	W	D	L	L	W	D	L	D	W	W	W	L	W	D	L	L	L	D	D	D	D	W	D	W	L	D	W	L	W
Olmedo	L	D	W	D	L	W	D	L	W	W	W	D	D	D	L	L	D	L	W	D	L	D	D	L	L	D	L	L	L	W	L	L	W	W	W	L

Source: LigaPro
W = Win; D = Draw; L = Loss; P = Postponed

== Top scorers ==
As of 30 October 2022

Rank	Name	Club	Goals
1	(Ecuador) Ronie Carrillo	El Nacional	16
2	(Ecuador) Alejandro Tobar	Imbabura	11
2	(Ecuador) Bryan Rodríguez	Libertad	11
4	(Ecuador) Mario Barrionuevo	Búhos ULVR	10
5	(Ecuador) Kevin Rodríguez	Imbabura	9
5	(Argentina) Kevin Hoyos	América de Quito	9
7	(Ecuador) Steven Gómez	El Nacional	8
8	(Paraguay) César Espínola	Libertad	7

Source: Ecuagol

== Number of teams by province ==
Position	Province	Number	Teams
1	Pichincha	3	América de Quito, El Nacional and Independiente Juniors
2	Chimborazo	1	Olmedo
2	Guayas	1	Búhos ULVR
2	Imbabura	1	Imbabura
2	Loja	1	Libertad
2	Manabí	1	Manta
2	Santo Domingo de los Tsáchilas	1	Atlético Santo Domingo
2	Tungurahua	1	Chacaritas

== See also ==
- 2022 Ecuadorian Serie A
- 2022 Segunda Categoría
- 2022 Copa Ecuador
