= 1962 Campeonato Ecuatoriano de Fútbol =

Campeonato Ecuatoriano de Fútbol
- Season: 1962
- Champions: Everest (1st title)
- Copa Campeones: Everest
- Matches played: 32
- Goals scored: 105 (3.28 per match)
- Top goalscorer: Iris López (9 goals)
- Biggest home win: Barcelona 6–0 Aucas
- Biggest away win: América de Quito 1–4 Everest
- Highest scoring: España 4–3 Emelec; 9 de Octubre 6–1 España

The 1962 Campeonato Ecuatoriano de Fútbol (English: Ecuadorian Football Championship) was the 4th national championship for football teams in Ecuador.

Guayaquilean club Everest won their first national title, and earned a berth in the 1963 Copa de Campeones. To date, this is Everest's only national title.

== Qualified teams ==
Competition	Team	Qualification method
Guayaquil; 4 berths	Emelec	1962 Guayaquil champion
Guayaquil; 4 berths	Barcelona	1962 Guayaquil runner-up
Guayaquil; 4 berths	9 de Octubre	1962 Guayaquil top-four finisher
Guayaquil; 4 berths	Everest	1962 Guayaquil top-four finisher
Interandino; 4 berths	Aucas	1962 Interandino champion
Interandino; 4 berths	América de Quito	1962 Interandino runner-up
Interandino; 4 berths	España	1962 Interandino top-four finisher
Interandino; 4 berths	LDU Quito	1962 Interandino top-four finisher

== Standings ==
Pos	Team	Pld	W	D	L	GF	GA	GD	Pts	Qualification or relegation
1	Everest	8	6	2	0	19	5	+14	14	Championship Playoff
2	Barcelona	8	6	2	0	20	7	+13	14	Championship Playoff
3	Emelec	8	6	1	1	21	11	+10	13	
4	9 de Octubre	8	5	1	2	14	8	+6	11	
5	España	8	1	2	5	12	23	−11	4	
6	LDU Quito	8	1	1	6	7	14	−7	3	
7	América de Quito	8	1	1	6	8	18	−10	3	
8	Aucas	8	0	2	6	4	19	−15	2	

== Results ==
Home \ Away (Note: Teams from the same association did not play each other.)	9OC	BAR	EME	EVE	AMQ	AUC	ESP	LDQ
9 de Octubre					1–0	2–1	6–1	1–0
Barcelona					2–1	6–0	1–1	4–2
Emelec					3–1	4–1	4–1	2–1
Everest					3–0	3–0	3–2	3–0
América de Quito	2–1	2–2	1–2	1–4				
Aucas	0–1	1–2	1–1	0–0				
España	1–1	0–2	4–3	2–3				
LDU Quito	3–1	0–1	1–2	0–0				

Legend: Blue = home team win; Yellow = draw; Red = away team win.

== Championship playoff ==
Team 1	Score	Team 2
Everest	1–1	Barcelona

Campeonato Ecuatoriano de Fútbol
1962 champion
Everest
1st title
