= Velardi =

Velardi is a surname. Notable people with the surname include:

- Luciano Velardi (born 1981), Italian footballer
- Paola Velardi (born 1955), Italian computer scientist
- Valerie Velardi, ex-wife of Robin Williams

== See also ==
- Velarde (disambiguation)
