= Germán Corengia =

Argentine footballer and manager

Personal information
- Full name: Germán Luis Corengia
- Date of birth: 27 April 1981 (age 45)
- Place of birth: Haedo, Argentina
- Height: 1.84 m (6 ft 0 in)
- Position: Defensive midfielder

Team information
- Current team: Torre del Mar (president)

Senior career*
Years	Team	Apps	(Gls)
2003–2004	Almirante Brown		

Managerial career
- 2008–2009: Los Andes (youth) (coordinator)
- 2009: Los Andes (interim)
- 2009: Los Andes (assistant)
- 2009–2010: Los Andes
- 2010: Sacachispas
- 2011: Cuniburo
- 2012: Deportes Concepción
- 2012–2013: Acassuso
- 2013–2014: Lota Schwager
- 2014–2015: Curicó Unido
- 2015–2016: Unión San Felipe
- 2016: Rampla Juniors
- 2017: Ecuador (assistant)
- 2017: Al-Nassr (assistant)
- 2018: Al-Wasl (assistant)
- 2019: Unión San Felipe
- 2020: Coquimbo Unido
- 2021: Chile (advisor)
- 2021: Cuniburo (sporting director)
- 2022–2023: Cuniburo
- 2024: Barcelona SC (youth) (coordinator)
- 2024: Barcelona SC (interim)
- 2024–2025: Montijo
- 2024–2025: Montijo (sporting director)
- 2025–: Torre del Mar (president)
- * Club domestic league appearances and goals

Germán Luis Corengia (born 27 April 1981) is an Argentine football manager and former player who played as a defensive midfielder. He is the current owner and president of Spanish club UD Torre del Mar.

== Career ==
In March 2025, Corengia purchased the rights of the Spanish club UD Torre del Mar.
