= Velarde =

Velarde may refer to:

- Velarde, New Mexico, United States
- Velarde CF, Spanish football team
- Velarde map, a 1734 map of the Philippines

== People ==
- Carlos Velarde (born 1990), Mexican boxer
- Efraín Velarde (born 1986), Mexican football player
- Enrique Gorostieta Velarde (1889–1929), Mexican soldier
- Fabiola León-Velarde (born 1956), Peruvian physiologist
- F. X. Velarde (1897–1960), English architect
- Jorge Velarde (born 1960), Ecuadorian painter
- Joyo Velarde (born 1974), Filipino singer
- Juan Velarde (disambiguation), several people
- Katrina Velarde (born 1994), Filipina singer
- Luis Galarreta (born 1971), Peruvian politician
- Mario Velarde (1940–1997), Mexican football player
- Mike Velarde (born 1939), Filipino religious leader
- Pablita Velarde (1918–2006), American painter
- Pedro Murillo Velarde, Spanish Jesuit cartographer and publisher of the Velarde map
- Pedro Velarde y Santillán (1779–1808), Spanish soldier
- Ramón López Velarde (1888–1921), Mexican poet
- Randy Velarde (born 1962), American baseball player
- Sergio Tovar Velarde (born 1982), Mexican film producer
- Silvia Velarde Pereyra (born 1970), known as Sibah, Bolivian singer-songwriter

== See also ==
- Fabian Velardes (born 1984), Argentine middleweight boxer
- Fernando Orlando Velárdez (born 1981), American lightweight boxer
- Velardi, a surname
