= Ítalo Cavagnari =

Peruvian footballer (born 1945)

Personal information
- Full name: Luis Ítalo Cavagnari Silva
- Date of birth: 27 July 1945
- Place of birth: Callao, Peru
- Position: Right winger

Senior career*
| Years | Team | Apps | (Gls) |
| 1962–1964 | Sport Boys | | |
| 1965 | Defensor Lima | | |
| 1966–1969 | Alianza Lima | | (12+) |
| 1970 | FBC Melgar | | |
| 1971–1972 | Olmedo | | (14+) |
| 1973 | Atlético Riobamba | | |
| 1974 | Carmen Mora de Encalada | | |
| 1975 | Macará | | |

International career
| 1965–1966 | Peru | 3 | (0) |
- * Club domestic league appearances and goals

Luis Ítalo Cavagnari Silva (born 27 July 1945, date of death unknown) was a Peruvian footballer who played as a right winger.

== Career ==
On 25 September 1966, Cavagnari scored four goals for Alianza Lima in an 8–0 win against Deportivo Municipal. In 1971, he was the top goal scorer in the Ecuadorian Serie B with 14 goals for Olmedo. The following year, he scored Olmedo's first ever goal against Emelec, in a 4–1 defeat at the Estadio Modelo on 9 July.

Cavagnari made three appearances for the Peru national team, including in a 1966 FIFA World Cup qualification match against Uruguay in 1965 and two matches against Brazil in 1966.

== Personal life ==
His sister, Nancy Cavagnari, is a Peruvian actress. Cavagnari is deceased.
