= Akurio =

Akurio may refer to:

- Akurio people, an ethnic group of Suriname
- Akurio language, a Cariban language

== See also ==
- Acurio
