= Ronie Carrillo =

Ecuadorian footballer (born 1996)

Personal information
- Full name: Ronie Edmundo Carrillo Morales
- Date of birth: September 8, 1996 (age 30)
- Place of birth: Quito, Ecuador
- Height: 1.86 m (6 ft 1 in)
- Position: Striker

Team information
- Current team: C.S. Emelec
- Number: 9

Youth career
- 2008–2012: Liga de Quito
- 2012–2013: ESPOLI
- 2013–2014: Deportivo Quito

Senior career*
Years	Team	Apps	(Gls)
2014–2016	Deportivo Quito	1	(0)
2016–2017	América de Quito	36	(33)
2017	→ Liga de Quito (loan)	8	(1)
2018	Universidad Católica	1	(0)
2018–2020	América de Quito	44	(8)
2021	Aucas	2	(0)
2021	Liga de Portoviejo	13	(4)
2022–2023	El Nacional	42	(25)
2023–2024	Portimonense	24	(4)
2024–2025	Juventude	14	(1)
2025	→ Inter de Limeira (loan)	5	(1)
2025	Botafogo-SP	23	(4)
2026	Mushuc Runa	23	(10)
2026–	Emelec	11	(3)
- * Club domestic league appearances and goals as of 31 October 2026

Ronie Edmundo Carrillo Morales (born 8 September 1996) is an Ecuadorian professional footballer who plays as a striker for Ecuadorian Serie A club Emelec.

== Professional career ==
Carrillo is a youth product of Liga de Quito, ESPOLI and Deportivo Quito. He began his senior career with Deportivo Quito in 2014, making one appearance that season. In 2016 he moved to América de Quito in the Ecuadorian Serie B, where he scored 15 goals in 17 games as top scorer, and helped the team achieve promotion. This earned him a brief return to his childhood club Liga de Quito in 2017.

In 2018, he moved to Universidad Católica, and shortly after América de Quito where he stayed a couple of seasons. He then had short stints with Aucas and Liga de Portoviejo, before moving to El Nacional in 2022 where he again won the Ecuadorian Serie B. On 14 July 2023, he moved to the Portuguese Primeira Liga with Portimonense.

== Honours ==
El Nacional

- Ecuadorian Serie B: 2022

Individual

- Ecuadorian Serie B top scorer 2016
