= Juan Velarde =

Juan Velarde may refer to:

- Juan Velarde (economist) (born 1927), Spanish economist
- Juan Velarde (aviator) (born 1974), Spanish pilot
- Juan Velarde (wrestler) (born 1954), Peruvian Olympic wrestler
