= 2024 Ecuadorian Serie B =

LigaPro Serie B
- Season: 2024
- Dates: 13 March – 30 October 2024
- Champions: Cuniburo
- Promoted: Cuniburo; Manta
- Matches: 180
- Goals: 385 (2.14 per match)
- Top goalscorer: José Lugo (21 goals)
- All statistics correct as of 9 June 2024.

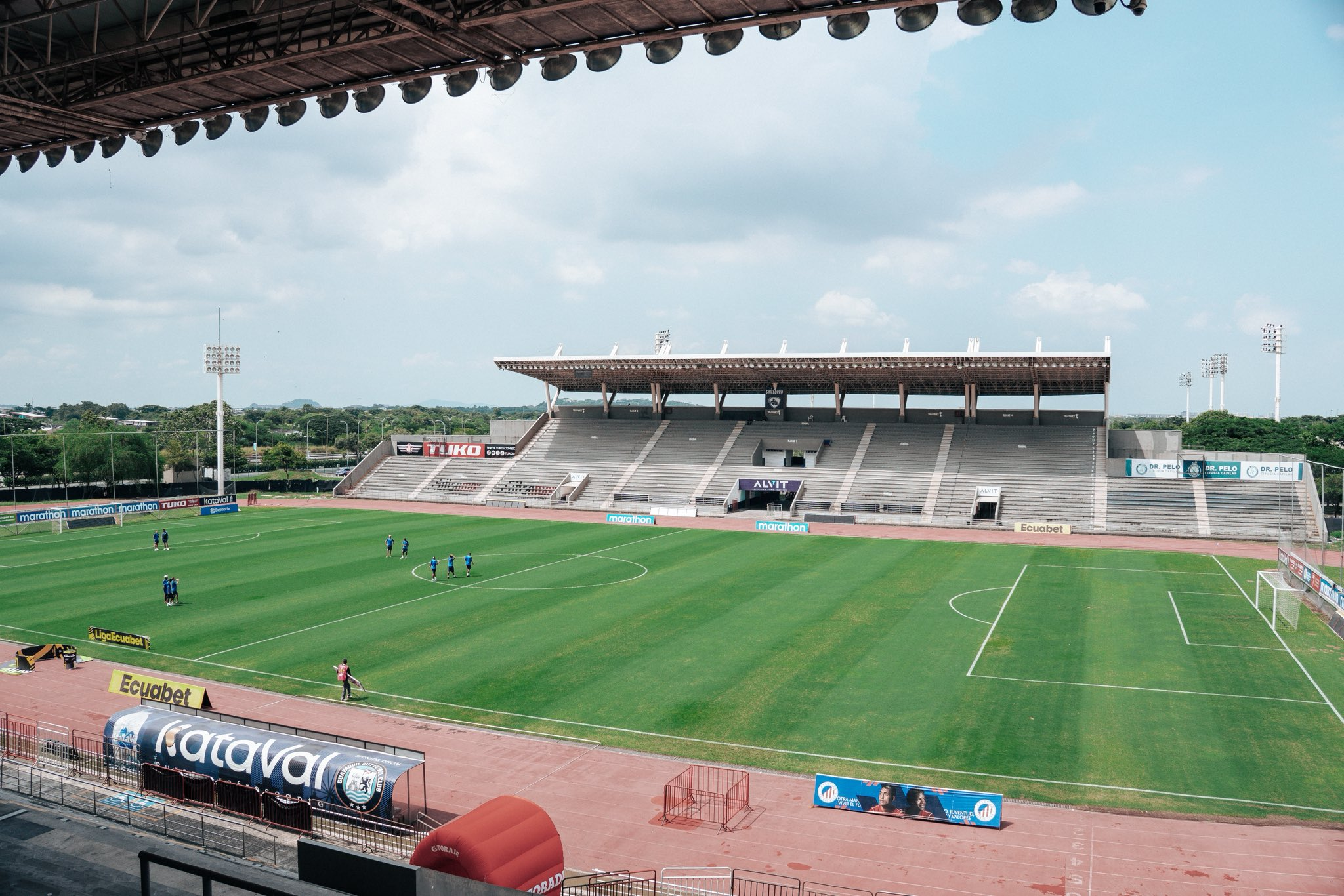
Estadio Chucho Benítez - a LigaPro Serie B stadium

The 2024 Campeonato Ecuatoriano de Fútbol Serie B, known as the LigaPro Serie B 2024 for sponsoring purposes, is the 66th season of the Serie B, Ecuador's second tier football league, and the sixth under the management of the Liga Profesional de Fútbol del Ecuador (or LigaPro). The season began on 13 March and ends on 29 October 2024.

== Teams ==
Club	City	Stadium	Capacity
9 de Octubre	Guayaquil	Alejandro Ponce Noboa	5,000
Chacaritas	Pelileo	Ciudad de Pelileo	8,000
Cuniburo	Cayambe	Olímpico Guillermo Albornoz	12,000
Gualaceo	Gualaceo	Gerardo León Pozo	2,791
Guayaquil City	Guayaquil	Christian Benítez	10,152
Independiente Juniors	Sangolquí	Banco Guayaquil	12,000
Leones del Norte	Atuntaqui	Olímpico Jaime Terán	10,000
Manta	Manta	Jocay	21,000
San Antonio	Ibarra	Olímpico de Ibarra	18,600
Vargas Torres	Esmeraldas	Folke Anderson	14,000

== League table ==
Pos	Team	Pld	W	D	L	GF	GA	GD	Pts	Promotion, qualification or relegation
1	Cuniburo (C, P)	36	21	6	9	64	37	+27	69	Promotion to Serie A
2	Manta (P)	36	17	9	10	45	39	+6	60	Promotion to Serie A
3	Guayaquil City	36	15	14	7	51	25	+26	59	
4	Independiente Juniors (Note: Reserve teams were ineligible for promotion.)	36	15	12	9	50	30	+20	57	Ineligible for promotion
5	9 de Octubre	36	12	11	13	38	40	−2	47	
6	Gualaceo	36	13	8	15	29	39	−10	47	
7	San Antonio (Note: Reserve teams were ineligible for promotion.)	36	9	17	10	27	32	−5	44	Ineligible for promotion
8	Leones del Norte	36	8	13	15	30	38	−8	37	
9	Vargas Torres	36	5	18	13	26	45	−19	33	
10	Chacaritas	36	6	10	20	25	60	−35	28	

Source: LigaPro
Rules for classification: 1) Points; 2) Goal difference; 3) Goals scored; 4) Away goals scored; 4) Head-to-head points; 5) Head-to-head goal difference; 6) Head-to-head away goals scored; 8) Draw.
(C) Champions; (P) Promoted

== Results ==
Home \ Away	9D0	CHA	CUN	GUA	GYC	IND	LDN	MAN	SAN	VAR	9D0	CHA	CUN	GUA	GYC	IND	LDN	MAN	SAN	VAR
9 de Octubre	—	1–0	1–0	2–2	0–0	0–0	0–0	0–3	2–1	0–0	—	4–1	3–2	0–0	0–2	2–2	1–0	1–0	2–1	2–2
Chacaritas	1–4	—	1–2	1–2	2–1	1–5	2–0	1–0	0–0	0–1	1–1	—	1–5	1–1	0–0	0–2	2–1	0–1	0–0	1–1
Cuniburo	3–1	1–2	—	1–0	1–0	1–0	4–1	2–1	0–0	2–1	5–2	2–0	—	2–0	0–1		1–0	6–2	0–0	2–0
Gualaceo	2–1	1–0	0–1	—	0–4	3–2	2–1	1–0	0–1	0–0		0–0	1–0	—	0–0	2–1	0–2	1–1	0–1	1–0
Guayaquil City	1–1	5–0	0–2	3–2	—	0–0	0–0	1–1	4–0	1–0	1–0	3–0	2–2	3–1	—	0–0	2–0	3–0	2–0	3–0
Independiente Juniors	1–0	1–0	4–0	3–0	1–0	—	2–0	0–1	2–0	1–1	2–1	2–0	1–1	4–1	2–3	—	1–1	1–2	0–1	2–0
Leones del Norte	2–1	2–0	2–3	0–1	0–0	1–1	—	3–0	0–1	2–2	0–0	2–0	2–2	0–1	1–0	0–1	—	1–1	0–0	1–1
Manta	1–2	0–1	2–1	1–0	0–0	1–0	3–1	—	1–1	0–0	2–1	2–1	1–0	1–0	2–2	0–2	2–1	—	0–0	6–1
San Antonio	1–0	1–1	1–0	0–1	2–2		0–1	3–4	—	2–2	1–0	1–1	1–1	1–0	2–0		0–1	1–2	—	0–0
Vargas Torres	2–1	1–1	0–1	1–0	2–1		1–1	0–1	1–1	—	0–1	4–2	1–5	0–1	1–1		0–0	0–0	1–1	—

Updated to match(es) played on 29 October 2024. Source: LigaPro
Legend: Blue = home team win; Yellow = draw; Red = away team win.

== See also ==
- 2024 Ecuadorian Serie A
- 2024 Segunda Categoría
- 2024 Copa Ecuador
