= Vinotinto F.C. Ecuador =

Ecuadorian football club

Vinotinto Ecuador
- Full name: Vinotinto Fútbol Club Ecuador
- Nicknames: Vinotinto; Vene-ecuatorianos; La Vinoneta; Llaneros; Chamos
- Founded: 11 April 1992; 34 years ago
- Ground: Olímpico Atahualpa
- Capacity: 38,258
- Chairman: Alejandra Durán
- Manager: Gabriel Schürrer
- League: Ecuadorian Serie B
- 2025: Serie A, First stage: 14th of 16; Relegation group: 4th of 4 (relegated)
| Home colours | Away colours | Third colours |

Vinotinto Fútbol Club Ecuador, formerly Cuniburo Fútbol Club, is an Ecuadorian professional football club from the city of Cayambe. Founded on 11 April 1992 they play in the Serie A.

== History ==
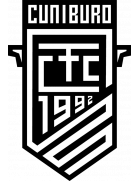
Cuniburo FC logo

Founded on 11 April 1992, Cuniburo only reached the Segunda Categoría in 2008, where they narrowly missed out promotion in the final rounds.

After not competing in the 2021 season due to the COVID-19 pandemic, Cuniburo returned to an active status for the 2022 season, with a new board and with a new manager being Argentine Germán Corengia. In that year, they won the Segunda Categoría and achieved promotion to the Serie B for the first time ever.

Cuniburo finished the 2023 Serie B in the third place, only three points behind Imbabura. On 13 October 2024, the club achieved a first-ever promotion to the Serie A after a 2–0 win over San Antonio, and lifted the trophy three days later, after a 5–2 routing of 9 de Octubre.

On 7 November 2024, it was announced that Cuniburo will change its name to Vinotinto Ecuador starting from this season. The name change, approved by the Ecuadorian Ministry of Sports, was made after the club was acquired by the owners of Segunda Categoría club Atlético Vinotinto prior to the start of the 2024 season, and aimed to have the club reach out to the Venezuelan expatriate community in Ecuador; Vinotinto FC became the first team, while Atlético Vinotinto became their reserve team, now in the Serie B.

== Honours ==
- Segunda Categoría: 2022
- Ecuadorian Serie B: 2024

== Current squad ==
As of 2 September 2025

Note: Flags indicate national team as defined under FIFA eligibility rules; some limited exceptions apply. Players may hold more than one non-FIFA nationality.

| No. | Pos. | Nation | Player |
|---|---|---|---|
| 1 | GK | ECU | Joan López |
| 2 | DF | ARG | Iago Iriarte |
| 3 | DF | ECU | Carlos Micolta |
| 4 | DF | ARG | Alan Aguirre (Captain) |
| 5 | DF | ECU | Kevin Coba |
| 6 | MF | ECU | Andrés Oña |
| 7 | FW | ECU | José Lugo |
| 8 | MF | ECU | Alexis Melo |
| 9 | FW | ARG | Nicolás Molina |
| 10 | FW | ECU | Danny Luna |
| 11 | FW | ECU | Ariel Mina |
| 12 | GK | ECU | Mateo Santos |
| 13 | DF | ECU | Marco Carrasco |

| No. | Pos. | Nation | Player |
|---|---|---|---|
| 15 | MF | VEN | Christian Larotonda |
| 17 | FW | ARG | Rafael Monti |
| 18 | FW | ECU | Kevin Ushiña |
| 22 | DF | ECU | Edwin Rodríguez |
| 23 | DF | ECU | Luis Gómez |
| 25 | GK | ARG | Lisandro Mitre (on loan from All Boys) |
| 26 | DF | ECU | Edison Hernández |
| 36 | DF | ARG | Gian Nardelli |
| 40 | MF | ECU | Francisco Mera |
| 53 | FW | ECU | Alex Delgado |
| 77 | FW | ECU | Romario Ibarra |
