= Gastón Acurio =

Peruvian chef

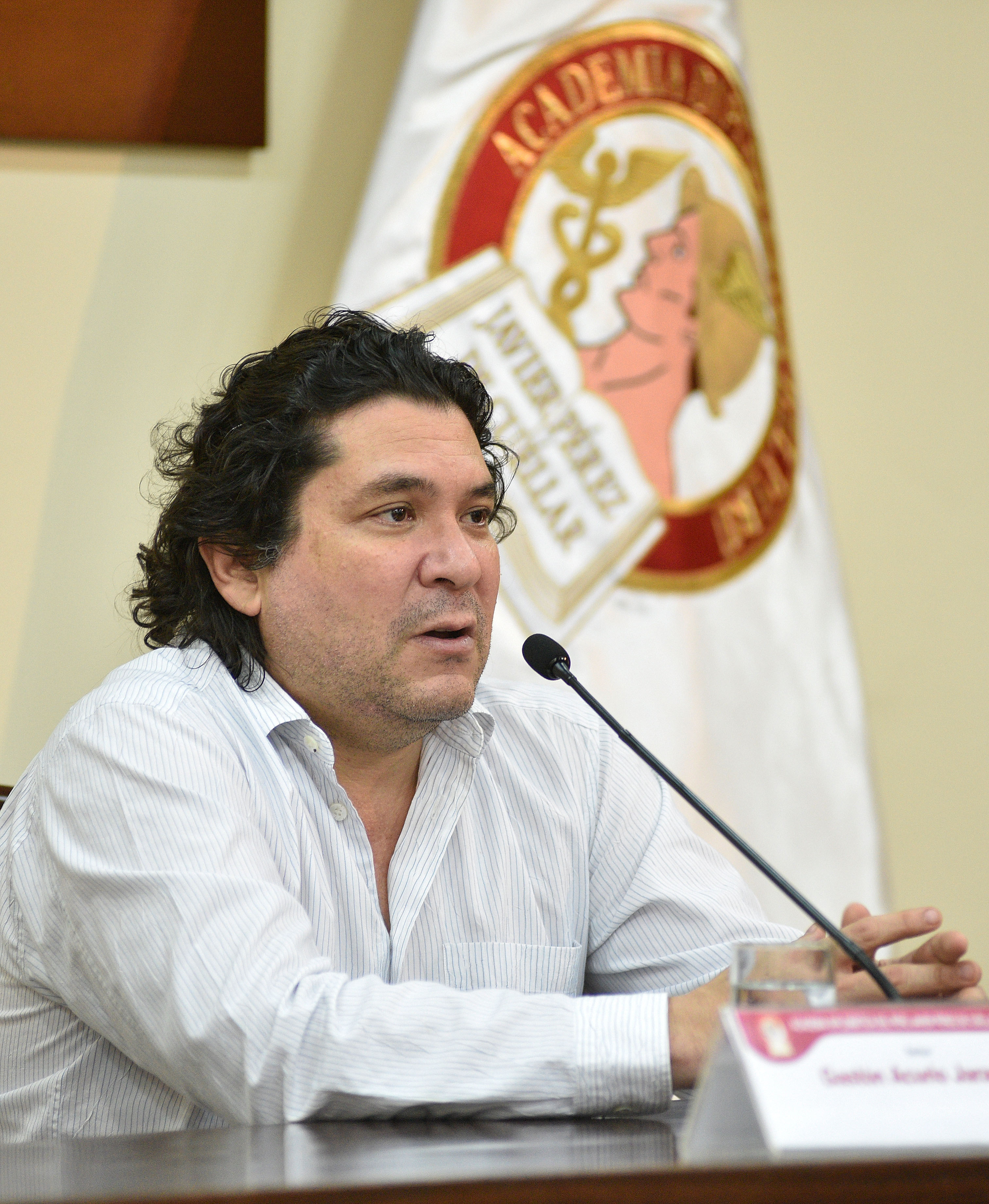
- Acurio in 2015
- Born: October 30, 1967 (age 58); Lima, Peru
- Education: Le Cordon Bleu, Paris
- Culinary career
- Cooking style: Peruvian
- Current restaurant(s): Astrid & Gastón, Café del Museo, T'anta, La Mar, Pasquale Hnos.
- Television show: Aventura Culinaria

Gastón Acurio Jaramillo (born October 30, 1967) is a Peruvian chef and ambassador of Peruvian cuisine. He owns several restaurants in various countries, and is the author of several books. In Peru, he is the host of a television program and contributes to culinary magazines and daily newspapers.

He started Pasquale Hnos., a Peruvian sangucheria or fast-food restaurant focused on Peruvian sandwiches; it did not fulfill his vision and he left the project.

In 2018 he was awarded the Lifetime Achievement Award.

According to a study by the Inter-American Development Bank (IDB) about innovation in Peruvian cuisine (2022), Acurio's influence on the cuisine of Peru and Latin America —where Europe has traditionally been regarded as a model of haute cuisine— has been very significant. More than anyone else, he renewed Peruvian cuisine and thus enabled a remarkable generation of Peruvian chefs. Other innovative chefs from Peru, such as Virgilio Martínez, Micha Tsumura, Pedro Schiaffino, Toshi Matsufuji and Hector Solís, have acknowledged a debt to him and consider him their community builder and leader.

In 2019, the IDB chose him to teach the Enrique V. Iglesias Chair on Culture and Development. On that occasion, Trinidad Zaldívar, head of the IDB's Creativity and Culture Unit, said at its headquarters in Washington, DC: "This was a recognition to Gastón for his work promoting the progress of Latin America and the Caribbean through gastronomy. And we want it to also be an inspiration for the thousands of entrepreneurs and innovators in the region, who are committed to the potential of the Orange Economy to contribute to the economic and social development of their countries".

== Personal life ==
Acurio is a maternal uncle of professional tennis player Ignacio Buse.
