= Club Deportivo Everest =

Ecuadorian football club

Everest
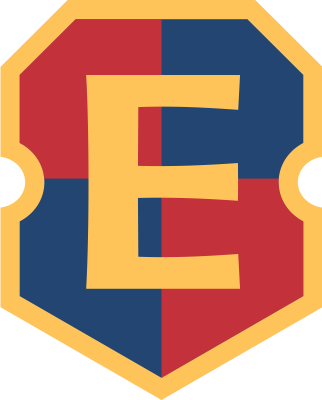
- Full name: Club Deportivo Everest
- Nicknames: El Equipo de la Montaña (The Team of the Mountain); La Roja (The Red); Los Everestinos (The Everestans); La Roja del Everest (The Everest Red); El Ciclón Rojo (The Red Cyclone)
- Founded: February 2, 1931; 95 years ago
- Ground: Estadio Alejandro Ponce Noboa; Guayaquil, Ecuador
- Capacity: 3,500
- Chairman: Guillermo Chedraui
- Manager: Segundo Castro
- League: Segunda Categoría
- 2018: 5th
Home colours	Away colours

Club Deportivo Everest is an Ecuadorian football team based in Guayaquil. They currently play in the third-level Segunda Categoría, but have spent ten seasons in the top-flight Serie A.

== Overview ==
Everest is one of the nine teams in the country to win a national championship. Their only conquest came in 1962. Their trophy haul also includes one Campeonato Professional de Guayaquil title in 1960. Over the years, they have bounced between the Serie A and Serie B before finally being relegated to the Segunda Categoria in 1983. They are ranked 19th in the Serie A's all-time standings.

The club was founded on 2 February 1931 under the name Círculo Deportivo Everest. They are named after the Mount Everest. The team plays their home matches in Estadio Alejandro Ponce Noboa, but often uses Estadio Modelo Alberto Spencer Herrera.

== Honours ==
=== National ===
- Serie A
  - Winners (1): 1962

=== Regional ===
- Campeonato de Fútbol del Guayas
  - Winners (1): 1960
- Segunda Categoría del Guayas
  - Winners (9): 1967, 1972, 1973, 1976, 1984, 1985, 1996, 1998, 2020
