= Ecuadorian Serie B =

Primera Categoría Serie B
- Founded: 1971
- Country: Ecuador
- Confederation: CONMEBOL
- Number of clubs: 12
- Level on pyramid: 2
- Promotion to: Serie A
- Relegation to: Segunda Categoría
- Current champions: Guayaquil City (1st title) (2025)
- Most championships: Técnico Universitario (6 titles)
- Website: Official webpage
- Current: 2026 Ecuadorian Serie B

The Primera Categoría Serie B, shortened to Serie B or Primera B, is a professional football league in Ecuador. It is in the second tier of the Ecuadorian football league system. Currently contested by ten clubs, it operates a system of promotion and relegation with the top-flight Serie A and the bottom-level Segunda Categoría. The season runs from February to December in two stages. For sponsorship reasons, it is known as the LigaPro Banco Pichincha Pymes.

Serie B has been in place since 1971 and has been held on a yearly basis since (except 1973 and 1983–88), often holding two tournaments a year. The number of teams being promoted or relegated changed through the years because, like the Serie A, the format often changes on a seasonal basis. With the creation of LigaPro for the beginning of the 2019 season, the format consisted of two separate round robin stages. The top four teams with the most points after both stages were placed in a playoffs to determine the two teams who would earn promotion to Serie A the following season. Additionally, the two teams with the fewest points at the end of the season are relegated to the Segunda Categoría.

Thirty two different clubs have won the Serie B, but only twelve have won it multiple times. The most successful team is Técnico Universitario, who won their sixth title in 2017, while the current champion is Guayaquil City.

== Current teams ==
There are currently twelve teams in the 2026 Serie B.

Club	City	Stadium	Capacity
22 de Julio	Esmeraldas	Estadio Folke Anderson	14,000
9 de Octubre	Guayaquil	Alejandro Ponce Noboa	5,000
Atlético Rojiblanco	Guayaquil	Christan Benitez Betancourt	10,152
Cuenca Juniors	Cuenca	Alejandro Serrano Aguillar	14,500
Cumbayá	Cayambe	Olímpico Guillermo Albornoz	12,000
El Nacional	Quito	Olímpico Atahualpa	38,258
Gualaceo	Gualaceo	Gerardo León Pozo	2,791
Independiente Juniors	Sangolquí	Banco Guayaquil	12,000
Liga de Portoviejo	Portojevio	Reales Tamarindos	21,000
Santo Domingo	Santo Domingo	Etho Vega Baquero	10,172
San Antonio	Ibarra	Olímpico de Ibarra	18,600
Vinotinto	Quito	Olímpico Atahualpa	38,258

== List of champions ==
Ed.	Season		Champion (title count)	Runner-up	Top goalscorer
1	1971		Macará (1)	Olmedo	(Peru) Ítalo Cavagnari (14)
2	1972	E1	LDU Portoviejo (1)	Deportivo Quito	(Argentina) Ángel Liciardi (24)
3	1972	E2	Deportivo Cuenca (1)	Universidad Católica	(Argentina) Ángel Liciardi (24)
4	1974	E1	LDU Quito (1)	América de Quito	
5	1974	E2	Aucas (1)	Deportivo Quito	
6	1975		Audaz Octubrino (1)	9 de Octubre	(Argentina) Carlos Infantino (26)
7	1976	E1	Carmen Mora (1)	Deportivo Quito	(Argentina) Carlos Infantino (24)
8	1976	E2	LDU Portoviejo (2)	América de Quito	(Argentina) Carlos Infantino (24)
9	1977	E1	LDU Cuenca (1)	Manta Sport	(Uruguay) Angel Guillermo Marin (27)
10	1977	E2	Técnico Universitario (1)	Deportivo Quito	(Uruguay) Angel Guillermo Marin (27)
11	1978	E1	Bonita Banana (1)	Valdez	(Argentina) Carlos Spadoni (24)
12	1978	E2	América de Quito (1)	LDU Quito	(Argentina) Carlos Spadoni (24)
13	1979	E1	Manta Sport (1)	Aucas	(Paraguay) Miguel Adolfo López (20)
14	1979	E2	El Nacional (1)	Everest	(Paraguay) Miguel Adolfo López (20)
15	1980	E1	Deportivo Quito (1)	LDU Cuenca	
16	1980	E2	LDU Portoviejo (3)	Deportivo Cuenca	
17	1981	E1	Emelec (1)	9 de Octubre	(Argentina) Enrique Lanza (26)
18	1981	E2	Técnico Universitario (2)	LDU Portoviejo	(Argentina) Enrique Lanza (26)
19	1982	E1	Quevedo (1)	Aucas	(Paraguay) Miguel Adolfo López (10)
20	1982	E2	Manta Sport (2)	América de Quito	(Paraguay) Miguel Adolfo López (10)
21	1989	E1	Delfín (1)	Universidad Católica	(Brazil) Rooney de Oliveira (15)
22	1989	E2	Juventus (1)	River Plate Riobamba	(Brazil) Rooney de Oliveira (15)
23	1990	E1	Universidad Católica (1)	LDU Portoviejo	(Brazil) Paulo César (14)
24	1990	E2	Juvenil (1)	LDU Loja	(Brazil) Paulo César (14)
25	1991	E1	Green Cross (1)	LDU Portoviejo	(Peru) José Felix Salazar (19)
26	1991	E2	Aucas (2)	ESPOLI	(Peru) José Felix Salazar (19)
27	1992	E1	LDU Portoviejo (4)	ESPOLI	(Paraguay) Hugo Rivas Mendoza (14)
28	1992	E2	Santos (1)	Calvi	(Paraguay) Hugo Rivas Mendoza (14)
29	1993		ESPOLI (1)	LDU Portoviejo	(Ecuador) Johny Quiñonez (21)
30	1994		Olmedo (1)	9 de Octubre	(Ecuador) Max Mecías (18)
31	1995		Deportivo Cuenca (2)	Técnico Universitario	(Ecuador) Pedro Valencia (16)
32	1996		Quevedo (2)	Calvi	(Brazil) Carlos Guttman Furtado (14)
33	1997		Panamá (1)	Delfín	(Argentina) Fernando Lavezzi (13)
34	1998		Macará (2)	Audaz Octubrino	(Ecuador) Luis Zambrano (24)
35	1999		Técnico Universitario (3)	LDU Portoviejo	(Ecuador) José Esterilla (17)
36	2000		LDU Portoviejo (5)	Delfín	(Colombia) Aldemar Sanchez (15)
37	2001		LDU Quito (2)	Deportivo Cuenca	(Argentina) Oscar Pacheco (27)
38	2002		Técnico Universitario (4)	Manta	(Argentina) Martín Gorozo (22)
39	2003		Olmedo (2)	Macará	(Uruguay) Alex Rodríguez (21)
40	2004		Quevedo (3)	LDU Loja	(Ecuador) Alberto Capurro (26)
41	2005	A	ESPOLI (2)	Manta	(Ecuador) Leonardo García (17)
42	2005	C	Macará (3)	Universidad Católica	(Ecuador) Marwin Pita (13)
43	2006	E1	Deportivo Azogues (1)	Universidad Católica	(Ecuador) Edmundo Zura (18)
44	2006	E2	Imbabura (1)	Universidad Católica	(Ecuador) Edmundo Zura (18)
45	2007		Universidad Católica (2)	ESPOLI	(Ecuador) Jasson Zambrano (25)
46	2008		Manta (1)	LDU Portoviejo	(Ecuador) Narciso Mina (25)
47	2009		Independiente del Valle (1)	Universidad Católica	(Paraguay) Cristian Hermosilla (18)
48	2010		LDU Loja (1)	Imbabura	(Brazil) Fábio Renato (28)
49	2011		Técnico Universitario (5)	Macará	(Ecuador) Carlos Quintero (28)
50	2012		Universidad Católica (3)	Quevedo	(Paraguay) Luis Espínola (18)
51	2013		Olmedo (3)	Mushuc Runa	(Argentina) Daniel Neculmán (29)
52	2014		Aucas (3)	River Ecuador	(Ecuador) Jimmy Delgado (22)
53	2015		Delfín (2)	Fuerza Amarilla	(Ecuador) Wagner Valencia (20)
54	2016		Macará (4)	Clan Juvenil	(Ecuador) Jorge Palacios (22)
55	2017		Técnico Universitario (6)	Aucas	(Ecuador) Edson Montaño (20)
56	2018		Mushuc Runa (1)	América de Quito	(Ecuador) Álex George (18)
57	2019		Orense (1)	LDU Portoviejo	(Ecuador) Luis Espínola (17)
58	2020		9 de Octubre (1)	Manta	(Ecuador) Ángel Ledesma (9)
59	2021		Cumbayá (1)	Gualaceo	(Paraguay) César Espínola (18)
60	2022		El Nacional (2)	Libertad	(Ecuador) Ronie Carrillo (16)
61	2023		Macará (5)	Imbabura	(Argentina) Facundo Callejo (18)
62	2024		Cuniburo	Manta	(Ecuador) José Lugo (19)
63	2025		Guayaquil City (1)	Leones	(Ecuador) Patricio Vargas (15)

== Titles by club ==
Club	Titles	Seasons won
Técnico Universitario	6	1977 E2, 1981 E2, 1999, 2002, 2011, 2017
LDU Portoviejo	5	1972 E1, 1976 E2, 1980 E2, 1992 E1, 2000
Macará	5	1971, 1998, 2005 C, 2016, 2023
Aucas	3	1974 E2, 1991 E2, 2014
Olmedo	3	1994, 2003, 2013
Quevedo	3	1982 E1, 1996, 2004
Universidad Católica	3	1990 E1, 2007, 2012
ESPOLI	2	1993, 2005 A
Delfín	2	1989 E1, 2015
Deportivo Cuenca	2	1972 E2, 1995
El Nacional	2	1979 E2, 2022
LDU Quito	2	1974 E1, 2001
Manta Sport	2	1979 E1, 1982 E2
Guayaquil City	1	2025
9 de Octubre	1	2020
América de Quito	1	1978 E2
Audaz Octubrino	1	1975
Bonita Banana	1	1978 E1, 1976 E1
Cumbayá	1	2021
Cuniburo	1	2024
Deportivo Azogues	1	2006 E1
Deportivo Quito	1	1980 E1
Emelec	1	1981 E1
Green Cross	1	1991 E1
Imbabura	1	2006 E2
Independiente del Valle	1	2009
Juvenil	1	1990 E2
Juventus	1	1989 E2
LDU Cuenca	1	1977 E1
LDU Loja	1	2010
Manta	1	2008
Mushuc Runa	1	2018
Orense	1	2019
Panamá	1	1997
Santos	1	1992 E2

== Titles by city ==
City	Nº of titles	Clubs
Quito	14	Aucas (3), Universidad Católica (3), El Nacional (2), ESPOLI (2), LDU Quito (2), América de Quito (1), Deportivo Quito (1)
Ambato	12	Técnico Universitario (6), Macará (5), Mushuc Runa (1)
Manta	6	Manta Sport (2), Delfín (2), Green Cross (1), Manta FC (1)
Portoviejo	5	LDU Portoviejo (5)
Guayaquil	4	9 de Octubre (1), Emelec (1), Guayaquil City (1), Panamá (1)
Cuenca	3	Deportivo Cuenca (2), LDU Cuenca (1)
Machala	3	Audaz Octubrino (1), Bonita Banana (1), Orense (1)
Riobamba	3	Olmedo (3)
Esmeraldas	2	Juvenil (1), Juventus (1)
Azogues	1	Deportivo Azogues (1)
Cayambe	1	Cuniburo (1)
Cumbayá	1	Cumbayá (1)
El Guabo	1	Santos (1)
Ibarra	1	Imbabura (1)
Loja	1	LDU Loja (1)
Pasaje	1	Carmen Mora (1)
Quevedo	1	Deportivo Quevedo (1)
Sangolquí	1	Independiente del Valle (1)
