= L.D.U. Cuenca =

Ecuadorian football club

Liga de Cuenca
- Full name: Liga Deportiva Universitaria de Cuenca
- Nickname(s): los chulos
- Founded: 6 February 1972; 53 years ago
- Ground: cazhapta
- Capacity: 12,000
- Chairman: Fabian Vallejo Mora
- Manager: Servio Cabrera
- League: Segunda Categoría
- 2008: Serie B, 9th (relegated)
Home colours	Away colours

Liga Deportiva Universitaria de Cuenca is a football club based in Cuenca, Ecuador currently in the Second Category Ecuadorian football Championship.

== Honors ==
- Championship Champion Provincial Azuay (4): 2004, 2005, 2007, 2010
- Serie B (1): 1977 -E1
- Runner up of the Series B of Ecuador (1): 1980 -E1
- Runner up Second Category (2): 1986, 1988
