= 2019 Liga Deportiva Universitaria de Quito season =

L.D.U. Quito
2019 season
- President: Guillermo Romero
- Manager: Pablo Repetto
- Stadium: Estadio Rodrigo Paz Delgado
- Serie A: Runner-up
- Conmebol Libertadores: Quarter-finals
- Copa Ecuador: Champions (1st title)
- Top goalscorer: League: Rodrigo Aguirre (12 goals); All: Rodrigo Aguirre (18 goals)
Home colours	Away colours	Third colours

Liga Deportiva Universitaria de Quito's 2019 season was the club's 89th year of existence, the 66th year in professional football, and the 58th in the top level of professional football in Ecuador.

== Club ==
=== Personnel ===
President: Guillermo Romero
Honorary President: Rodrigo Paz
President of the Executive Commission: Esteban Paz
Director of football: Edgardo Bauza
Sporting manager: Santiago Jácome

=== Coaching staff ===
Manager: Pablo Repetto
Assistant manager: Óscar Quagliatta, Franklin Salas
Physical trainer: Roberto Teixeira
Goalkeeper trainer: Luis Preti

=== Kits ===
Supplier: Puma
Sponsor(s): Banco Pichincha, Discover, Marathonbet, Pilsener, Roche (October/November)

Home
Home
alternate 1
Home 2
Away
Third

Type	Shirt	Shorts	Socks	Additional information
Home	White	White	White	
Home alternate 1	White	Blue	White	Worn on March 13 (vs Flamengo)
Home 2	White	Pink	White	Special edition Cancer awareness month kit; worn on October 20 (vs Delfín), October 23 (vs Emelec), October 26 (vs Deportivo Cuenca), October 30 (vs Emelec), November 2 (vs Fuerza Amarilla), November 10 (vs Delfín) and November 16 (vs Delfín)
Away	Red	Red	Red	
Third	Blue	Blue	Blue	

== Squad information ==
Num	Pos	Nat.	Player	Age	Since	App	Goals	Notes
1	GK	ECU	Leonel Nazareno	24	2015	25	0	
2	DF	ECU	Édison Realpe	22	2017	15	0	
3	DF	URU	Carlos Rodríguez	28	2019	0	0	
6	DF	ECU	Luis Ayala	25	2019	0	0	
7	MF	ECU	Édison Vega	28	2016	103	1	
8	MF	ECU	Jordy Alcívar	19	2018	2	0	
9	MF	ECU	Jacob Murillo	25	2019	0	0	
10	MF	ECU	Andrés Chicaiza	26	2019	0	0	
11	MF	ECU	Anderson Julio	22	2016	80	16	
12	GK	ECU	Erik Viveros	22	2017	1	0	
14	DF	ECU	José Quintero	28	2015	132	11	
15	DF	ECU	Franklin Guerra	26	2018	44	1	
16	MF	ECU	Julio Angulo	28	2018	13	0	
17	MF	ECU	Jefferson Arce	18	2019	0	0	
18	MF	ECU	Jefferson Orejuela	25	2018	38	0	
19	FW	COL	Cristian Martínez	30	2018	15	1	
20	DF	ECU	Christian Cruz	26	2018	38	0	
21	DF	ECU	Andersson Ordóñez	24	2018	18	0	
22	GK	ARG	Adrián Gabbarini	33	2018	42	0	
24	DF	ECU	Kevin Minda	20	2018	5	0	
25	MF	ECU	Antonio Valencia	33	2019	0	0	
26	MF	ECU	Jhojan Julio	20	2016	74	9	
27	FW	URU	Rodrigo Aguirre	24	2019	0	0	
28	MF	ECU	José Luis Cazares	27	2019	0	0	
29	MF	ECU	Adolfo Muñoz	21	2019	0	0	
30	DF	ECU	Renny Folleco	20	2018	0	0	
31	FW	ECU	Djorkaeff Reasco	19	2016	13	2	
32	DF	ECU	Joel Ventura	18	2019	0	0	
33	MF	ECU	Joseph Espinoza	18	2019	0	0	
35	MF	ECU	Thiago Serpa	19	2019	0	0	
36	DF	ECU	Jhon Flores	21	2019	0	0	
37	MF	ECU	Joan Villarruel	19	2019	0	0	
38	MF	ECU	Khader Arce	18	2019	0	0	
40	FW	ECU	José Ayoví	27	2019	0	0	
44	DF	ECU	Luis Caicedo	27	2019	0	0	
-	MF	ECU	William Ocles	20	2017	3	1	
-	MF	ECU	Bryan Viñán	18	2019	0	0	

Note: Caps and goals are of the national league and are current as of the beginning of the season.

=== Winter transfers ===
Players In
Name	Nat	Pos	Age	Moving from
Nicolás Freire	ARG	DF	24	Palmeiras (Brazil) (loan)
Carlos Rodríguez	URU	DF	28	Peñarol (Uruguay) (loan)
José Luis Cazares	ECU	MF	27	Macará (Ecuador)
Andrés Chicaiza	ECU	MF	26	Delfín (Ecuador)
Adolfo Muñoz	ECU	MF	21	El Nacional (Ecuador)
Jacob Murillo	ECU	MF	25	Estudiantes (Argentina)
José Ayoví	ECU	FW	27	Club Tijuana (Mexico) (loan)
Rodrigo Aguirre	URU	FW	24	Udinese (Italy) (loan)

Players Out
Name	Nat	Pos	Age	Moving to
Jonathan Borja	ECU	MF	24	El Nacional (Ecuador) (loan return)
Roberto Garcés	ECU	MF	25	Independiente del Valle (Ecuador)
Fernando Guerrero	ECU	MF	29	Emelec (Ecuador)
Gastón Rodríguez	URU	FW	26	Peñarol (Uruguay) (loan return)

=== Summer transfers ===
Players In
Name	Nat	Pos	Age	Moving from
Luis Caicedo	ECU	DF	27	Veracruz (Mexico)
Luis Ayala	ECU	DF	25	Independiente del Valle (Ecuador)
Antonio Valencia	ECU	MF	33	Manchester United (England)

Players Out
Name	Nat	Pos	Age	Moving to
Aníbal Chalá	ECU	DF	22	Toluca (Mexico)
Nicolás Freire	ARG	DF	25	Pumas (Mexico)
Horacio Salaberry	ECU	DF	31	River Plate (Uruguay)
Jefferson Intriago	ECU	MF	23	FC Juárez (Mexico)
Juan Luis Anangonó	ECU	FW	30	TBA

== Competitions ==
Competition	Started round	Final position / round	First match	Last match
Serie A	First Stage	Runner-up	February 9	December 15
CONMEBOL Libertadores	Group Stage	Quarter-finals	March 7	August 28
Copa Ecuador	Third Stage	Champions	May 1	November 16

=== Pre-season friendlies ===
February 2 Noche Blanca	L.D.U. Quito	2–2	Independiente Santa Fe	Quito
20:30 UTC−05:00	A. Julio 23' (pen.); Chicaiza 83'	Report	Rodríguez 4', 50' (pen.)	Stadium: Estadio Rodrigo Paz Delgado; Attendance: 31,528; Referee: Roddy Zambrano

=== Other friendlies ===
Copa Alberto Spencer

==== Semi-finals ====
June 16 Semi-finals	Aucas	1-0	L.D.U. Quito	Quito
12:00 UTC−05:00	Figueroa 66'			Stadium: Estadio Gonzalo Pozo Ripalda

June 20 Semi-finals	L.D.U. Quito	4–2	Aucas	Quito
19:00 UTC−05:00	Murillo 18'; J. Julio 62'; Martínez 83'; Alcívar 88'		Quiñónez 36'; Barreiro 73'	Stadium: Estadio Rodrigo Paz Delgado

==== Finals ====
June 23 Finals	Barcelona SC	1–0	L.D.U. Quito	Guayaquil
17:00 UTC−05:00	Quiñónez 24'			Stadium: Estadio Monumental Banco Pichincha

June 30 Finals	L.D.U. Quito	1-1	Barcelona SC	Quito
17:00 UTC−05:00	Cazares 10'		Velasco 44'	Stadium: Estadio Rodrigo Paz Delgado

=== Serie A ===
The 2019 season is Liga's 58th season in the Serie A and their 18th consecutive. It is the first tournament organized by LigaPro.

==== First stage ====
Pos	Team	Pld	W	D	L	GF	GA	GD	Pts	Qualification or relegation
1	Macará	30	17	11	2	47	16	+31	62	Advance to Playoffs
2	Barcelona	30	17	4	9	55	38	+17	55	Advance to Playoffs
3	Universidad Católica	30	16	5	9	48	29	+19	53	Advance to Playoffs
4	Delfín	30	15	8	7	46	33	+13	53	Advance to Playoffs
5	Independiente del Valle	30	15	7	8	41	29	+12	52	Advance to Playoffs
6	LDU Quito	30	13	10	7	46	30	+16	49	Advance to Playoffs
7	Aucas	30	14	7	9	48	44	+4	49	Advance to Playoffs
8	Emelec	30	14	4	12	43	30	+13	46	Advance to Playoffs
9	El Nacional (Note: El Nacional were deducted one point for failing to submit their payrolls and social security contributions to the IESS for the month of August.)	30	13	6	11	41	34	+7	44	
10	Deportivo Cuenca (Note: Deportivo Cuenca were deducted one point for failing to submit their payrolls and social security contributions to the IESS for the month of May.)	30	12	7	11	44	46	−2	42	
11	Olmedo	30	9	7	14	34	44	−10	34	
12	Guayaquil City	30	8	7	15	35	48	−13	31	
13	Mushuc Runa	30	8	6	16	36	58	−22	30	
14	Técnico Universitario	30	8	5	17	40	60	−20	29	
15	América de Quito (R)	30	6	7	17	26	41	−15	25	Relegation to Serie B
16	Fuerza Amarilla (Note: Fuerza Amarilla were deducted four points for failing to submit their payrolls and social security contributions to the IESS, and one additional point for failing to submit their payrolls and social security contributions to the IESS for the month of May.) (R)	30	2	5	23	24	74	−50	6	Relegation to Serie B

Source: LigaPro, Soccerway
Rules for classification: 1) Points, 2) Goal difference, 3) Goals for, 4) Away goals for, 5) Head-to-head record, 6) Drawing of lots.
(R) Relegated
Notes:

Results summary

Overall								Home						Away					
Pld	W	D	L	GF	GA	GD	Pts	W	D	L	GF	GA	GD	W	D	L	GF	GA	GD
30	13	10	7	46	30	+16	49	8	5	2	29	16	+13	5	5	5	17	14	+3

Results by round

Round	1	2	3	4	5	6	7	8	9	10	11	12	13	14	15	16	17	18	19	20	21	22	23	24	25	26	27	28	29	30
Ground	H	A	A	H	A	H	A	H	A	H	A	H	A	H	A	A	H	H	A	H	A	H	A	H	A	H	A	H	A	H
Result	W	D	W	W	L	L	D	D	D	W	W	D	L	D	D	W	L	W	L	D	L	W	W	W	D	W	W	D	L	W
Position	5	3	3	1	6	8	9	10	9	8	6	6	6	6	7	6	7	6	7	7	8	8	7	7	7	7	7	6	7	6

Updated to match(es) played on November 2, 2019. Source: Competitive matches
A = Away; H = Home; W = Win; D = Draw; L = Loss

February 9 Round 1	L.D.U. Quito	3–2	Olmedo	Quito
17:15 UTC−05:00	Quintero (yellow card) 7'; Anangonó 15'; Intriago 41' (pen.), (yellow card) 42'; Minda (yellow card) 52'; Freire 90+3'	Report	Bolaños 34' (pen.); Sierra (yellow card) 40'; Nazareno (yellow card) 57'; Ortiz 83'	Stadium: Estadio Rodrigo Paz Delgado; Attendance: 13,304; Referee: Roberto Sánchez

February 16 Round 2	Universidad Católica	0–0	L.D.U. Quito	Quito
17:15 UTC−05:00	Martínez (yellow card) 30'; Godoy (yellow card) 42'; Betancourt (red card) 48'; Mosquera (yellow card) 88'; De Los Santos (yellow card) 90+1'	Report	Anangonó (yellow card) 21'; Quintero (yellow card) 30'; Cruz (yellow card) 84'	Stadium: Estadio Olímpico Atahualpa; Attendance: 6,455; Referee: Franklin Congo

February 23 Round 3	América de Quito	0–1	L.D.U. Quito	Quito
17:15 UTC−05:00	Carabalí (yellow card) 81'	Report	Anangonó 34' (pen.), (yellow card) 43'; Cruz (yellow card) 46'	Stadium: Estadio Olímpico Atahualpa; Attendance: 4,583; Referee: Guillermo Guerrero

March 2 Round 4	L.D.U. Quito	4–0	Guayaquil City	Quito
17:30 UTC−05:00	Intriago 15'; Freire 32', 37'; Martínez 69'	Report	Caicedo (yellow card) 59'; Cangá (yellow card) 66'	Stadium: Estadio Rodrigo Paz Delgado; Attendance: 8,493; Referee: Augusto Aragón

March 9 Round 5	Macará	3–0	L.D.U. Quito	Ambato
17:15 UTC−05:00	Rizotto (yellow card) 37'; Corozo 45+2', 79'; Estrada 49'; Arce (yellow card) 60'	Report	Vega (yellow card) 19'; Minda (yellow card) 30'; Aguirre (yellow card) 30'; Freire (yellow card) 49'; Chicaiza (yellow card) 54'; Cazares (yellow card) 75'	Stadium: Estadio Bellavista; Referee: Carlos Orbe

March 17 Round 6	L.D.U. Quito	0–1	Aucas	Quito
12:00 UTC−05:00	Quintero (yellow card) 5' (yellow-red card) 78'	Report	De Jesús (yellow card) 13'; Quiñónez (yellow card) 22'; Gracia (yellow card) 30'; J. Quiñónez (yellow card) 53'; Vega 90+3' (o.g.)	Stadium: Estadio Rodrigo Paz Delgado; Attendance: 17,219; Referee: Roddy Zambrano

March 30 Round 7	Barcelona SC	1–1	L.D.U. Quito	Guayaquil
17:30 UTC−05:00	Martínez 25'; Pineida (yellow card) 42'; Pérez (yellow card) 55'; Herrera (yellow card) 72'; Oyola (yellow card) 77'	Report	Aguirre (yellow card) 21', (goal) 85'; Realpe (yellow card) 54'; Cazares (yellow card) 56'; Murillo (yellow card) 88'	Stadium: Estadio Monumental Banco Pichincha; Referee: Guillermo Guerrero

April 5 Round 8	L.D.U. Quito	0–0	Técnico Universitario	Quito
19:15 UTC−05:00	Chalá (yellow card) 15'	Report	Caicedo (yellow card) 45+1'; Zambrano (yellow card) 83'; Marret (yellow card) 90+3'; Moyano (yellow card) 90+4'	Stadium: Estadio Rodrigo Paz Delgado; Referee: Óscar Proaño

April 14 Round 9	El Nacional	2–2	L.D.U. Quito	Quito
12:00 UTC−05:00	Caicedo 18' (pen.); Mina (yellow card) 19'; Arce (yellow card) 30' (yellow-red card) 65'; Borja 57'; Santana (yellow card) 79'; Segura (yellow card) 90+1'	Report	Aguirre (yellow card) 33' (yellow-red card) 89'; Ayoví 39'; Muñoz 83'; A. Julio (yellow card) 90+3'; Quintero (yellow card) 90+6'	Stadium: Estadio Olímpico Atahualpa; Referee: Carlos Orbe

April 20 Round 10	L.D.U. Quito	2–1	Emelec	Quito
17:00 UTC−05:00	Intriago (yellow card) 36'; J. Julio (yellow card) 50'; A. Julio 56'; Guerra 63'; Quintero (yellow card) 70'	Report	Angulo 4'; Jaime (yellow card) 78'	Stadium: Estadio Rodrigo Paz Delgado; Attendance: 12,162; Referee: Franklin Congo

April 28 Round 11	Mushuc Runa	0–4	L.D.U. Quito	Ambato
14:00 UTC−05:00	Mina (yellow card) 24'; Quilumba (yellow card) 90+4'; Medina (yellow card) 90+4'	Report	A. Julio 1', 52'; Intriago (yellow card) 35'; Ayoví 61'; Martínez 90+4' (pen.)	Stadium: Estadio Bellavista; Referee: Daniel Salazar

May 4 Round 12	L.D.U. Quito	1–1	Independiente del Valle	Quito
17:15 UTC−05:00	Orejuela (yellow card) 16'; Intriago (yellow card) 25'; Quintero (yellow card) 35' (yellow-red card) 88'; A. Julio 66'; Martínez (yellow card) 90+1'	Report	Corozo 46'; Cabeza (yellow card) 55'; Franco (yellow card) 69'; León (yellow card) 77'; Dájome (yellow card) 90+3'	Stadium: Estadio Rodrigo Paz Delgado; Attendance: 14,289; Referee: Marlon Vera

May 12 Round 13	Delfín	2–1	L.D.U. Quito	Manta
15:15 UTC−05:00	Ordóñez 7', (yellow card) 30' (yellow-red card) 54'; Burbano 49'; López (yellow card) 59'	Report	Aguirre 3', (yellow card) 90+2'; A. Julio (yellow card) 32'; Chalá (yellow card) 39'; Realpe (yellow card) 81' (yellow-red card) 89'	Stadium: Estadio Jocay; Referee: Franklin Congo

May 18 Round 14	L.D.U. Quito	2–2	Deportivo Cuenca	Quito
18:30 UTC−05:00	Aguirre 28', (yellow card) 90+3'; Rodríguez 45+2'; Cazares (yellow card) 54'	Report	Becerra (yellow card) 1'; Uchuari 44'; Martínez 72'; Bedoya (yellow card) 82'; Luna (yellow card) 90+4'; Ojeda (red card) 90+4'	Stadium: Estadio Rodrigo Paz Delgado; Referee: Roberto Alarcón

May 25 Round 15	Fuerza Amarilla	1–1	L.D.U. Quito	Machala
15:00 UTC−05:00	Cristaldo (yellow card) 65' (yellow-red card) 90'; Avilés 83'	Report	Rodríguez 29'; Quintero (yellow card) 46'; Aguirre (yellow card) 77'	Stadium: Estadio 9 de Mayo; Referee: Luis Quiroz

July 6 Round 16	Olmedo	0-2	L.D.U. Quito	Riobamba
17:00 UTC−05:00	Durán (yellow card) 14'; Nazareno (yellow card) 28'; Ortíz (yellow card) 88'; Villacrés (yellow card) 90+2'	Report	Martínez 30' (pen.); Cazares (yellow card) 32'; Realpe (yellow card) 36'; J. Julio 54'	Stadium: Estadio Olímpico de Riobamba; Referee: Roberto Alarcón

July 13 Round 17	L.D.U. Quito	1-5	Universidad Católica	Quito
18:00 UTC−05:00	Orejuela (yellow card) 40'; Cruz (yellow card) 60'; A. Julio 80' (pen.); Martínez (yellow card) 82'	Report	de los Santos (yellow card) 9'; López 10'; Chalá 34', 69'; Amarilla 50', (yellow card) 77' (yellow-red card) 83'; Martínez (yellow card) 71'; Vides 90' (pen.)	Stadium: Estadio Rodrigo Paz Delgado; Referee: Augusto Aragón

July 18 Round 18	L.D.U. Quito	1-0	América de Quito	Quito
19:15 UTC−05:00	Muñoz (yellow card) 41'; Aguirre 43', (yellow card) 56'; Caicedo (yellow card) 75'; Valencia (yellow card) 80'	Report	Cifuentes (yellow card) 45'; Carabalí (yellow card) 56'; Lucas (yellow card) 79'; Dávila (yellow card) 90+1'	Stadium: Estadio Rodrigo Paz Delgado; Attendance: 8,774; Referee: Luis Quiroz

July 26 Round 19	Guayaquil City	1-0	L.D.U. Quito	Guayaquil
19:15 UTC−05:00	Mancilla 36'; Chávez (yellow card) 66'; Hoyos (yellow card) 75'; Mondaini (yellow card) 83'	Report	Realpe (yellow card) 14'; Ordóñez (yellow card) 45'; Ayala (yellow card) 54'; Chicaiza (yellow card) 65'	Stadium: Estadio Christian Benítez Betancourt; Referee: Mario Romero

August 4 Round 20	L.D.U. Quito	1-1	Macará	Quito
14:00 UTC−05:00	Ayoví (yellow card) 45'; Caicedo (yellow card) 52'; Murillo (yellow card) 54'; Cruz (yellow card) 55'; Aguirre 60' (pen.); Muñoz (yellow card) 72'; Orejuela (yellow card) 86'	Report	Arboleda (yellow card) 39'; Estrada 56' (pen.), (yellow card) 68'; Manchot (yellow card) 67' (yellow-red card) 78'	Stadium: Estadio Rodrigo Paz Delgado; Referee: Roddy Zambrano

August 11 Round 21	Aucas	2-1	L.D.U. Quito	Quito
12:00 UTC−05:00	Mosquera 33'; Tévez (yellow card) 56'; Cruz 71' (o.g.)	Report	Ayoví 43'; Valencia (yellow card) 44'; Rodríguez (red card) 53'; Aguirre (yellow card) 76'; A. Julio (yellow card) 87'	Stadium: Estadio Gonzalo Pozo Ripalda; Referee: Daniel Salazar

August 16 Round 22	L.D.U. Quito	2-0	Barcelona SC	Quito
19:15 UTC−05:00	Ordóñez (yellow card) 19'; Aguirre (yellow card) 29', (goal) 90+3'; Valencia (yellow card) 41' (yellow-red card) 53'; A. Julio 68'; Nazareno (yellow card) 81'	Report	Pérez (yellow card) 4'; Erazo (yellow card) 16'; Álvez (yellow card) 53'; Arce (yellow card) 77'	Stadium: Estadio Rodrigo Paz Delgado; Attendance: 17,900; Referee: Augusto Aragón

August 24 Round 23	Técnico Universitario	0-2	L.D.U. Quito	Ambato
17:15 UTC−05:00	Zambrano (yellow card) 20'; Méndez (red card) 45'	Report	Martínez (yellow card) 12', (goal) 71'; Quintero (yellow card) 19'; Angulo 61', (yellow card) 62'	Stadium: Estadio Bellavista; Referee: Vinicio Espinel

September 1 Round 24	L.D.U. Quito	2-0	El Nacional	Quito
18:30 UTC−05:00	J. Julio 40'; A. Julio (yellow card) 83'; Martínez 86', (yellow card) 89'	Report	Peña (yellow card) 66'	Stadium: Estadio Rodrigo Paz Delgado; Attendance: 10,666; Referee: Guillermo Guerrero

September 15 Round 25	Emelec	1-1	L.D.U. Quito	Guayaquil
16:15 UTC−05:00	Angulo 15', (yellow card) 78'; Rojas (yellow card) 33'; Arroyo (yellow card) 43'; Carabalí (yellow card) 57'	Report	Orejuela (yellow card) 17'; Aguirre 39'; Caicedo (yellow card) 61'; Ayala (yellow card) 63'; Gabbarini (yellow card) 72'; Chicaiza (yellow card) 89'	Stadium: Estadio George Capwell; Referee: Marlon Vera

September 22 Round 26	L.D.U. Quito	4-0	Mushuc Runa	Quito
12:00 UTC−05:00	Guerra (yellow card) 24' (yellow-red card) 89'; Aguirre 37', 77' (pen.), 80', 83'	Report	Orzán (yellow card) 27'; Carrasco (yellow card) 50'	Stadium: Estadio Rodrigo Paz Delgado; Referee: Jefferson Macías

September 30 Round 27	Independiente del Valle	0-1	L.D.U. Quito	Quito
19:30 UTC−05:00	León (yellow card) 29'	Report	Aguirre 17'; Ayala (yellow card) 27'; Ordóñez (yellow card) 27'; Valencia (yellow card) 29'	Stadium: Estadio Olímpico Atahualpa; Referee: Diego Lara

October 20 Round 28	L.D.U. Quito	1-1	Delfín	Quito
14:15 UTC−05:00	Nazareno 83' (o.g.); Valencia (yellow card) 90+5'	Report	Riveros 63'; Ortíz (yellow card) 87'; Cangá (yellow card) 90+5'	Stadium: Estadio Rodrigo Paz Delgado; Referee: Alex Cajas

October 26 Round 29	Deportivo Cuenca	1-0	L.D.U. Quito	Cuenca
18:00 UTC−05:00	Becerra 58' (pen.); González (yellow card) 61' (yellow-red card) 82'; Cucco (yellow card) 76'; Ojeda (yellow card) 90+1'	Report	Guerra (yellow card) 28'; Chicaiza (yellow card) 36'; Quintero (yellow card) 90'	Stadium: Estadio Alejandro Serrano Aguilar; Referee: Carlos Orbe

November 2 Round 30	L.D.U. Quito	5-2	Fuerza Amarilla	Quito
13:00 UTC−05:00	Murillo 7', 27'; J. Julio 17'; Minda 75'; K. Arce 90+2'	Report	Ramírez 22'; Mina 67'	Stadium: Estadio Rodrigo Paz Delgado; Referee: Henri Arízaga

==== Quarter-finals ====
Results summary

Overall								Home						Away					
Pld	W	D	L	GF	GA	GD	Pts	W	D	L	GF	GA	GD	W	D	L	GF	GA	GD
2	1	0	1	4	3	+1	3	0	0	1	2	3	−1	1	0	0	2	0	+2

Results by round

Round	1	2
Ground	H	A
Result	L	W
Position	2	1

Updated to match(es) played on November 27, 2019. Source: Competitive matches
A = Away; H = Home; W = Win; D = Draw; L = Loss

November 23 Quarter-finals	L.D.U. Quito	2-3	Universidad Católica	Quito
19:30 UTC−05:00	Guerra (yellow card) 24'; Valencia (yellow card) 37', (goal) 90'; Ayoví (yellow card) 58'; Aguirre (yellow card) 71' (yellow-red card) 90+7'; Rodríguez 90+3'	Report	Amarilla 13', 61', 62'; Vides (yellow card) 24'; Carcelén (yellow card) 57'; Chalá (yellow card) 67'; Martínez (yellow card) 90+5'	Stadium: Estadio Rodrigo Paz Delgado; Referee: Marlon Vera

November 27 Quarter-finals	Universidad Católica	0-2	L.D.U. Quito	Quito
17:30 UTC−05:00	W.Chalá (yellow card) 13'; J. Chalá (yellow card) 26'; Mosquera (yellow card) 46'; López (yellow card) 64'; Armas (yellow card) 81'; Godoy (red card) 90+5'; Vides (yellow card) 90+6'	Report	J. Julio (yellow card) 16', (goal) 58'; Ayala (yellow card) 29'; Valencia (yellow card) 45+4'; Quintero (yellow card) 46'; Guerra 48', (yellow card) 76'; Martínez (yellow card) 86'	Stadium: Estadio Olímpico Atahualpa; Referee: Roberto Sánchez

==== Semi-finals ====
Results summary

Overall								Home						Away					
Pld	W	D	L	GF	GA	GD	Pts	W	D	L	GF	GA	GD	W	D	L	GF	GA	GD
2	1	1	0	3	1	+2	4	0	1	0	0	0	0	1	0	0	3	1	+2

Results by round

Round	1	2
Ground	A	H
Result	W	D
Position	1	1

Updated to match(es) played on December 7, 2019. Source: Competitive matches
A = Away; H = Home; W = Win; D = Draw; L = Loss

November 30 Semi-finals	Aucas	1-3	L.D.U. Quito	Quito
19:00 UTC−05:00	Montaño (yellow card) 22'; Romero (yellow card) 40'; Figueroa 64'; Anangonó (yellow card) 86'; Mosquera (yellow card) 90+5'	Report	J. Julio 20'; A. Julio 23'; Quintero (yellow card) 29'; Martínez 39'; Orejuela (yellow card) 90+5'	Stadium: Estadio Gonzalo Pozo Ripalda; Referee: Guillermo Guerrero

December 7 Semi-finals	L.D.U. Quito	0-0	Aucas	Quito
19:00 UTC−05:00	J. Julio (yellow card) 35'; Valencia (yellow card) 54'; A. Julio (yellow card) 31'; Murillo (red card) 90+3'	Report	Anangonó (yellow card) 33'; Figueroa (yellow card) 49'; Cuero (yellow card) 63'; Espinoza (yellow card) 90+2'; Mosquera (red card) 90+3'	Stadium: Estadio Rodrigo Paz Delgado; Attendance: 20,858; Referee: José Luis Espinel

==== Finals ====
Results summary

Overall								Home						Away					
Pld	W	D	L	GF	GA	GD	Pts	W	D	L	GF	GA	GD	W	D	L	GF	GA	GD
2	0	2	0	0	0	0	2	0	1	0	0	0	0	0	1	0	0	0	0

Results by round

Round	1	2
Ground	H	A
Result	W	D
Position	2	2

Updated to match(es) played on December 15, 2019. Source: Competitive matches
A = Away; H = Home; W = Win; D = Draw; L = Loss

December 11 Finals	L.D.U. Quito	0-0	Delfín	Quito
19:30 UTC−05:00	Chicaiza (yellow card) 82' (yellow-red card) 90+1'	Report	Caicedo (yellow card) 18'; Piñatares (yellow card) 43'; Nazareno (yellow card) 68'	Stadium: Estadio Rodrigo Paz Delgado; Attendance: 25,817; Referee: Marlon Vera

December 15 Finals	Delfín	0-0 (2–1 p)	L.D.U. Quito	Manta
15:00 UTC−05:00	López (yellow card) 51'; Caicedo (yellow card) 80'	Report	Quintero (yellow card) 61'; Vega (yellow card) 82'; Martínez (yellow card) 89'	Stadium: Estadio Jocay; Referee: Roberto Sánchez
	Penalties
	López (penalty scored); Piñatares (penalty missed); Cangá (penalty scored); Noboa (penalty missed); Garcés (penalty missed)		(penalty scored) Alcívar; (penalty missed) Valencia; (penalty missed) Caicedo; (penalty missed) Ayoví; (penalty missed) Martínez

=== CONMEBOL Libertadores ===
L.D.U. Quito qualified to the 2019 CONMEBOL Libertadores—their 17th participation in the continental tournament—as Champions of the 2018 Serie A. They entered the competition in the group stage.

==== CONMEBOL Libertadores squad ====
No.	Pos.	Nation	Player
1	GK	ECU	Leonel Nazareno
2	DF	ECU	Renny Folleco
3	DF	URU	Carlos Rodríguez
4	MF	ECU	Jefferson Arce
5	MF	ECU	Antonio Valencia
6	DF	ECU	Luis Ayala
7	MF	ECU	Édison Vega
8	FW	ECU	William Ocles
9	MF	ECU	Jacob Murillo
10	MF	ECU	Andrés Chicaiza
11	MF	ECU	Anderson Julio
12	GK	ECU	Erik Viveros
13	MF	ECU	Jordy Alcívar
14	DF	ECU	José Quintero
15	DF	ECU	Franklin Guerra

No.	Pos.	Nation	Player
16	MF	ECU	Julio Angulo
18	MF	ECU	Jefferson Orejuela
19	FW	COL	Cristian Martínez
20	DF	ECU	Christian Cruz
21	DF	ECU	Andersson Ordóñez
22	GK	ARG	Adrián Gabbarini (captain)
23	DF	ECU	Luis Caicedo
24	DF	ECU	Kevin Minda
25	DF	ECU	Édison Realpe
26	MF	ECU	Jhojan Julio
27	FW	URU	Rodrigo Aguirre
28	MF	ECU	José Luis Cazares
29	MF	ECU	Adolfo Muñoz
30	FW	ECU	José Ayoví

1.Antonio Valencia replaced Jefferson Intriago for the Round of 16.
2.Luis Ayala replaced Djorkaeff Reasco for the Round of 16.
3.Luis Caicedo replaced Nicolás Freire for the Round of 16.
4. Juan Luis Anangonó left the club.

Overall								Home						Away					
Pld	W	D	L	GF	GA	GD	Pts	W	D	L	GF	GA	GD	W	D	L	GF	GA	GD
10	4	3	3	16	13	+3	15	4	0	1	11	5	+6	0	3	2	5	8	−3

==== Group stage ====
Pos	Team	Pld	W	D	L	GF	GA	GD	Pts	Qualification
1	(Brazil) Flamengo	6	3	1	2	11	5	+6	10	Round of 16
2	(Ecuador) LDU Quito	6	3	1	2	12	8	+4	10	Round of 16
3	(Uruguay) Peñarol	6	3	1	2	7	5	+2	10	Copa Sudamericana
4	(Bolivia) San José	6	1	1	4	7	19	−12	4	

Source: CONMEBOL
Rules for classification: Group stage tiebreakers

March 7 Group Stage	L.D.U. Quito (Ecuador)	2–0	(Uruguay) Peñarol	Quito, Ecuador
19:00 UTC−05:00	Freire 25'; Aguirre 82', (yellow card) 90+1'	Report	Gargano (yellow card) 44'; Rodríguez (yellow card) 90+1'	Stadium: Estadio Rodrigo Paz Delgado; Attendance: 24,893; Referee: Fernando Rapallini (Argentina)

March 13 Group Stage	Flamengo (Brazil)	3–1	(Ecuador) L.D.U. Quito	Rio de Janeiro, Brazil
21:30 UTC−03:00	Éverton Ribeiro 9'; Cuéllar (yellow card) 53'; Gabriel 69'; Uribe 81'	Report	Aguirre (yellow card) 16'; Intriago (yellow card) 51'; Martínez 90+2' (pen.)	Stadium: Maracanã Stadium; Attendance: 62,440; Referee: Germán Delfino (Argentina)

April 2 Group Stage	San José (Bolivia)	3–3	(Ecuador) L.D.U. Quito	Oruro, Bolivia
18:15 UTC−04:00	Saucedo 30'; Cruz 71' (o.g.); Ramallo 77'	Report	Anangonó 25'; Mena 40', 69' (o.g.); Murillo (yellow card) 50'; Gabbarini (yellow card) 85'; Ayoví (yellow card) 90+3'	Stadium: Estadio Jesús Bermúdez; Referee: Arnaldo Samaniego (Paraguay)

April 9 Group Stage	Peñarol (Uruguay)	1–0	(Ecuador) L.D.U. Quito	Montevideo, Uruguay
21:30 UTC−03:00	Fernández (yellow card) 28'; Lema (yellow card) 50'; Rodríguez 70'; Novick (yellow card) 75'	Report	Freire (yellow card) 8'; Chicaiza (yellow card) 77'	Stadium: Estadio Campeón del Siglo; Referee: Alexis Herrera (Venezuela)

April 24 Group Stage	L.D.U. Quito (Ecuador)	2–1	(Brazil) Flamengo	Quito, Ecuador
19:30 UTC−05:00	Intriago (yellow card) 26'; Anangonó 45+3'; Chicaiza 73', (yellow card) 74'	Report	Bruno Henrique 19'; Rodrigo Caio (yellow card) 34'	Stadium: Estadio Rodrigo Paz Delgado; Attendance: 16,325; Referee: Néstor Pitana (Argentina)

May 8 Group Stage	L.D.U. Quito (Ecuador)	4–0	(Bolivia) San José	Quito, Ecuador
19:30 UTC−05:00	Guerra (yellow card) 41'; Martínez 65'; A. Julio 68', 74', 88'	Report	Torrico (yellow card) 32'; Gomes (yellow card) 64'; Mena (yellow card) 70'; Ovando (yellow card) 89'	Stadium: Estadio Rodrigo Paz Delgado; Attendance: 21,602; Referee: José Argote (Venezuela)

==== Round of 16 ====
July 23 Round of 16	L.D.U. Quito (Ecuador)	3–1	(Paraguay) Olimpia	Quito, Ecuador
19:30 UTC−05:00	Valencia (yellow card) 6'; Ayoví 12'; J. Julio 73'; Caicedo (yellow card) 80'; Aguirre 85'	Report	Alcaraz (yellow card) 18'; Camacho (yellow card) 28'; Rojas 62', (yellow card) 90+4'	Stadium: Estadio Rodrigo Paz Delgado; Attendance: 30,449; Referee: Patricio Loustau (Argentina)

July 30 Round of 16	Olimpia (Paraguay)	1–1	(Ecuador) L.D.U. Quito	Asunción, Paraguay
20:30 UTC−04:00	Mendieta (yellow card) 3', (goal) 35'; Silva (yellow card) 90+6'	Report	Aguirre (yellow card) 15'; J. Julio 20', (red card) 49'; Gabbarini (yellow card) 89'; Realpe (red card) 90+6'	Stadium: Estadio Defensores del Chaco; Referee: Diego Haro (Peru)

==== Quarter-finals ====
August 21 Quarter-finals	L.D.U. Quito (Ecuador)	0–3	(Argentina) Boca Juniors	Quito, Ecuador
17:15 UTC−05:00	Aguirre (yellow card) 19'; Orejuela (red card) 45+3'; Minda (red card) 48'; Caicedo (yellow card) 73'; Alcívar (yellow card) 84'	Report	Ábila 12'; Reynoso 47'; Mac Allister (yellow card) 68'; Caicedo 81' (o.g.)	Stadium: Estadio Rodrigo Paz Delgado; Referee: Wilmar Roldán (Colombia)

August 28 Quarter-finals	Boca Juniors (Argentina)	0–0	(Ecuador) L.D.U. Quito	Buenos Aires, Argentina
19:15 UTC−03:00	Capaldo (yellow card) 41'; Weigandt (yellow card) 50'	Report	Rodríguez (yellow card) 13'; Aguirre (yellow card) 15'; Guerra (yellow card) 18'; Valencia (yellow card) 52'; Alcívar (yellow card) 63'	Stadium: La Bombonera; Referee: Wilton Sampaio (Brazil)

=== Copa Ecuador ===
It's the first edition of the tournament. L.D.U. Quito entered the competition in the third stage.

Overall								Home						Away					
Pld	W	D	L	GF	GA	GD	Pts	W	D	L	GF	GA	GD	W	D	L	GF	GA	GD
10	4	4	2	15	6	+9	16	4	1	0	14	1	+13	0	3	2	1	5	−4

==== Third Stage ====
May 1 Third Stage	L.D.U. Quito	5–0	C.D. Gloria	Quito
19:30 UTC−05:00	Chicaiza 32'; Murillo (yellow card) 45+1'; Minda 54'; Aguirre 60', 68'; Martínez 79'	Report		Stadium: Estadio Rodrigo Paz Delgado; Attendance: 4,856; Referee: Jordan Montece

May 15 Third Stage	C.D. Gloria	0–0	L.D.U. Quito	Cuenca
20:00 UTC−05:00	Mideros (yellow card) 29' (yellow-red card) 64'; Padilla (yellow card) 46'; Angulo (yellow card) 57'	Report	Espinoza (yellow card) 22'; Angulo (yellow card) 40'; Realpe (yellow card) 90+1'	Stadium: Estadio Alejandro Serrano Aguilar; Attendance: 1,345; Referee: Jimmy Miño

==== Round of 16 ====
July 16 Round of 16	Alianza	0–0	L.D.U. Quito	Guano
15:30 UTC−05:00		Report	Realpe (yellow card) 53'; Murillo (yellow card) 66'	Stadium: Estadio Timoteo Machado; Attendance: 2,000; Referee: Ángel Castillo

August 8 Round of 16	L.D.U. Quito	5–1	Alianza	Quito
19:00 UTC−05:00	Guerra 3'; Murillo (yellow card) 24', (goal) 57' (pen.); Muñoz 66'; Martínez 69'; Viñán 78'	Report	Angulo 74'	Stadium: Estadio Rodrigo Paz Delgado; Attendance: 1,515; Referee: Jaime Sánchez

==== Quarter-finals ====
September 8 Quarter-finals	Aucas	0–0	L.D.U. Quito	Quito
12:00 UTC−05:00	Bedoya (yellow card) 14'	Report	Aguirre (yellow card) 21'; Angulo (yellow card) 90'; Valencia (yellow card) 90' (yellow-red card) 90+1'	Stadium: Estadio Gonzalo Pozo Ripalda; Attendance: 4,630; Referee: Diego Lara

September 18 Quarter-finals	L.D.U. Quito	0–0 (4–2 p)	Aucas	Quito
19:15 UTC−05:00	Aguirre (yellow card) 33'	Report	Anangonó (yellow card) 16'; Alvarado (yellow card) 28'; Gracia (yellow card) 32'; Bedoya (yellow card) 33'; Figueroa (yellow card) 61'; Burzio (yellow card) 75'; Romero (yellow card) 85'	Stadium: Estadio Rodrigo Paz Delgado; Attendance: 3,001; Referee: Roddy Zambrano
	Penalties
	Rodríguez (penalty scored); Chicaiza (penalty scored); Alcívar (penalty scored); Quintero (penalty scored)		(penalty scored) Figueroa; (penalty missed) Montaño; (penalty scored) Bedoya; (penalty missed) Romero

==== Semi-finals ====
October 23 Semi-finals	L.D.U. Quito	2–0	Emelec	Quito
19:15 UTC−05:00	Aguirre (yellow card) 33', (goal) 51'; Ayoví (yellow card) 49'; Martínez 78'	Report	Angulo (yellow card) 33'; Caicedo (yellow card) 41'; Arroyo (yellow card) 75'; Leguizamón (yellow card) 80'	Stadium: Estadio Rodrigo Paz Delgado; Attendance: 5,514; Referee: Luis Quiroz

October 30 Semi-finals	Emelec	2–0 (4–5 p)	L.D.U. Quito	Guayaquil
19:30 UTC−05:00	Orejuela (yellow card) 20'; Vega (yellow card) 22'; Leguizamón (yellow card) 65', (goal) 90+3'; Angulo 90'	Report	Ayala (yellow card) 14'; Guerra (yellow card) 67'; Orejuela (yellow card) 72'; Quintero (yellow card) 77'	Stadium: Estadio George Capwell; Referee: José Luis Espinel
	Penalties
	Angulo (penalty scored); Rojas (penalty scored); Leguizamón (penalty scored); Vega (penalty missed); Pernía (penalty scored)		(penalty scored) Rodríguez; (penalty scored) Valencia; (penalty scored) Murillo; (penalty scored) Martínez; (penalty scored) Aguirre

==== Finals ====
November 10 Semi-finals	L.D.U. Quito	2–0	Delfín	Quito
16:00 UTC−05:00	Chicaiza (yellow card) 39', (goal) 76'; Vega (yellow card) 41'; Aguirre (yellow card) 44', (goal) 54' (pen.)	Report	Perlaza (yellow card) 54'; Piñatares (yellow card) 58'; Cangá (yellow card) 86'	Stadium: Estadio Rodrigo Paz Delgado; Attendance: 14,530; Referee: Luis Quiroz

November 16 Semi-finals	Delfín	3–1	L.D.U. Quito	Manta
15:00 UTC−05:00	López 3'; Cangá (yellow card) 24'; Garcés 75', 90+1' (pen.); Piñatares (yellow card) 90+6'	Report	Chicaiza (yellow card) 22', (goal) 44'; Aguirre (yellow card) 77'; Rodríguez (yellow card) 90'; Angulo (yellow card) 90+6'	Stadium: Estadio Jocay; Referee: Roddy Zambrano

== Player statistics ==
Num	Pos	Player	App	Goal	Yellow card	Red card	App	Goal	Yellow card	Red card	App	Goal	Yellow card	Red card	App	Goal	Yellow card	Red card
Num	Pos	Player	Serie A				CONMEBOL Libertadores				Copa Ecuador				Total			
1	GK	Leonel Nazareno	1	—	1	—	—	—	—	—	4	—	—	—	5	—	1	—
2	DF	Édison Realpe	8	—	3	1	—	—	—	1	3	—	2	—	11	—	5	2
3	DF	Carlos Rodríguez	23	3	—	1	10	—	1	—	4	—	1	—	37	3	2	1
6	DF	Luis Ayala	13	—	4	—	2	—	—	—	8	—	1	—	23	—	5	—
7	MF	Édison Vega	23	—	2	—	8	—	—	—	6	—	1	—	37	—	3	—
8	MF	Jordy Alcívar	7	—	—	—	2	—	2	—	4	—	—	—	13	—	2	—
9	MF	Jacob Murillo	14	2	2	1	5	—	1	—	4	1	3	—	23	3	6	1
10	MF	Andrés Chicaiza	26	—	4	1	6	1	2	—	8	3	2	—	40	4	8	1
11	MF	Anderson Julio	29	7	5	—	9	3	—	—	5	—	—	—	43	10	5	—
12	GK	Erik Viveros	3	—	—	—	—	—	—	—	—	—	—	—	3	—	—	—
14	DF	José Quintero	24	—	10	2	7	—	—	—	8	—	1	—	39	—	11	2
15	DF	Franklin Guerra	27	2	3	1	4	—	2	—	7	1	1	—	38	3	6	1
16	MF	Julio Angulo	12	1	1	—	1	—	—	—	8	—	3	—	21	1	4	—
17	MF	Jefferson Arce	1	—	—	—	—	—	—	—	2	—	—	—	3	—	—	—
18	MF	Jefferson Orejuela	29	—	5	—	9	—	—	1	5	—	1	—	43	—	6	1
19	FW	Cristian Martínez	26	6	6	—	4	2	—	—	7	3	—	—	37	11	6	—
20	DF	Christian Cruz	15	—	4	—	9	—	—	—	—	—	—	—	24	—	4	—
21	DF	Andersson Ordóñez	5	—	3	—	—	—	—	—	3	—	—	—	8	—	3	—
22	GK	Adrián Gabbarini	34	—	1	—	10	—	2	—	6	—	—	—	50	—	3	—
24	DF	Kevin Minda	4	1	2	—	—	—	—	1	2	1	—	—	6	2	2	1
25	MF	Antonio Valencia	16	1	7	1	4	—	2	—	5	—	—	1	25	1	9	2
26	MF	Jhojan Julio	25	5	3	—	6	2	—	1	1	—	—	—	32	7	2	1
27	FW	Rodrigo Aguirre	22	12	8	2	9	2	5	—	7	4	5	—	38	18	18	2
28	MF	José Luis Cazares	10	—	4	—	2	—	—	—	2	—	—	—	14	—	4	—
29	MF	Adolfo Muñoz	22	1	2	—	3	—	—	—	5	1	—	—	30	2	2	—
30	DF	Renny Folleco	—	—	—	—	—	—	—	—	1	—	—	—	1	—	—	—
31	FW	Djorkaeff Reasco	—	—	—	—	—	—	—	—	1	—	—	—	1	—	—	—
32	DF	Joel Ventura	1	—	—	—	—	—	—	—	1	—	—	—	2	—	—	—
33	MF	Joseph Espinoza	1	—	—	—	—	—	—	—	3	—	1	—	4	—	1	—
35	MF	Thiago Serpa	1	—	—	—	—	—	—	—	2	—	—	—	3	—	—	—
36	DF	Jhon Flores	—	—	—	—	—	—	—	—	1	—	—	—	1	—	—	—
37	MF	Joan Villarruel	—	—	—	—	—	—	—	—	1	—	—	—	1	—	—	—
38	MF	Khader Arce	1	1	—	—	—	—	—	—	2	—	—	—	3	1	—	—
40	FW	José Ayoví	33	3	2	—	10	1	1	—	6	—	1	—	49	4	4	—
44	DF	Luis Caicedo	10	—	3	—	3	—	2	—	3	—	—	—	16	—	5	—
-	MF	William Ocles	—	—	—	—	—	—	—	—	1	—	—	—	1	—	—	—
-	MF	Bryan Viñán	—	—	—	—	—	—	—	—	2	1	—	—	2	1	—	—
5	MF	Jefferson Intriago	12	2	4	—	6	—	2	—	—	—	—	—	18	2	6	—
6	DF	Aníbal Chalá	6	—	2	—	—	—	—	—	1	—	—	—	7	—	2	—
17	FW	Juan Luis Anangonó	11	2	2	—	5	2	—	—	—	—	—	—	16	4	2	—
23	DF	Nicolás Freire	7	3	1	—	6	1	1	—	1	—	—	—	14	4	2	—
Totals			—	52	94	10	—	14	23	4	—	15	23	1	—	81	140	15

As of December 15, 2019

Note: Players in italics left the club mid-season.

== Team statistics ==
	Total	Home	Away
Total Games played	56	28	28
Total Games won	23	16	7
Total Games drawn	20	8	12
Total Games lost	13	4	9
Games played (Serie A)	36	18	18
Games won (Serie A)	15	8	7
Games drawn (Serie A)	13	7	6
Games lost (Serie A)	8	3	5
Games played (CONMEBOL Libertadores)	10	5	5
Games won (CONMEBOL Libertadores)	4	4	
Games drawn (CONMEBOL Libertadores)	3		3
Games lost (CONMEBOL Libertadores)	3	1	2
Games played (Copa Ecuador)	10	5	5
Games won (Copa Ecuador)	4	4	
Games drawn (Copa Ecuador)	4	1	3
Games lost (Copa Ecuador)	2		2
Biggest win (Serie A)	4–0 vs Guayaquil City; 4–0 vs Mushuc Runa; 4–0 vs Mushuc Runa	4–0 vs Guayaquil City; 4–0 vs Mushuc Runa	4–0 vs Mushuc Runa
Biggest loss (Serie A)	1–5 vs Universidad Católica	1–5 vs Universidad Católica	0–3 vs Macará
Biggest win (CONMEBOL Libertadores)	4–0 vs San José	4–0 vs San José	
Biggest loss (CONMEBOL Libertadores)	0–3 vs Boca Juniors	0–3 vs Boca Juniors	1–3 vs Flamengo
Biggest win (Copa Ecuador)	5–0 vs C.D. Gloria	5–0 vs C.D. Gloria	
Biggest loss (Copa Ecuador)	0–2 vs Emelec; 1–3 vs Delfín		0–2 vs Emelec; 1–3 vs Delfín
Clean sheets	26	14	12
Goals scored	84	56	28
Goals conceded	53	25	28
Goal difference	+31	+31	+0
Average GF per game	1.5	2	1
Average GA per game	0.95	0.89	1
Yellow cards	140	54	86
Red cards	15	9	6
Most appearances	(Argentina) Adrián Gabbarini (50)	(Ecuador) José Ayoví (25) (Argentina) Adrián Gabbarini (25)	(Argentina) Adrián Gabbarini (25)
Most minutes played	(Argentina) Adrián Gabbarini (4402)	(Argentina) Adrián Gabbarini (2197)	(Argentina) Adrián Gabbarini (2205)
Top scorer	(Uruguay) Rodrigo Aguirre (18)	(Uruguay) Rodrigo Aguirre (14)	(Uruguay) Rodrigo Aguirre (4) (Colombia) Cristian Martínez (5)
Worst discipline	(Uruguay) Rodrigo Aguirre (2) (red card) (18) (yellow card)	(Ecuador) José Quintero (2) (red card)	(Ecuador) Édison Realpe (2) (red card)
Penalties for	10/11 (90.91%)	6/6 (100%)	4/5 (80%)
Penalties against	6/9 (66.67%)	3/3 (100%)	3/6 (50%)
League Points	58/108 (53.7%)	31/54 (57.41%)	27/54 (50%)
Winning rate	41.07%	57.14%	25%

As of December 15, 2019
Source: See Competitive matches (above)
