= 2020 Recopa Sudamericana =

CONMEBOL Recopa Sudamericana 2020
- Event: Recopa Sudamericana
Independiente del Valle	Flamengo
(Ecuador)	(Brazil)
2	5
- (on aggregate)

First leg
Independiente del Valle	Flamengo
2	2
- Date: 19 February 2020
- Venue: Estadio Olímpico Atahualpa, Quito
- Referee: Leodán González (Uruguay)
- Attendance: 15,031

Second leg
Flamengo	Independiente del Valle
3	0
- Date: 26 February 2020
- Venue: Maracanã, Rio de Janeiro
- Referee: Fernando Rapallini (Argentina)
- Attendance: 69,986

The 2020 CONMEBOL Recopa Sudamericana (Portuguese: CONMEBOL Recopa Sul-Americana de 2020) was the 28th edition of the CONMEBOL Recopa Sudamericana (also referred to as the Recopa Sudamericana), the football competition organized by CONMEBOL between the winners of the previous season's two major South American club tournaments, the Copa Libertadores and the Copa Sudamericana.

The competition was contested in two-legged home-and-away format between Brazilian team Flamengo, the 2019 Copa Libertadores champions, and Ecuadorian team Independiente del Valle, the 2019 Copa Sudamericana champions. The first leg was hosted by Independiente del Valle at the Estadio Olímpico Atahualpa in Quito, Ecuador on 19 February 2020, while the second leg was hosted by Flamengo on 26 February 2020 at the Maracanã in Rio de Janeiro, Brazil.

Flamengo won 5–2 on aggregate to claim their first Recopa Sudamericana title.

== Teams ==
Team	Qualification	Previous app.
(Brazil) Flamengo	2019 Copa Libertadores champions	0 (Debut)
(Ecuador) Independiente del Valle	2019 Copa Sudamericana champions	0 (Debut)

Bold indicates winning years

== Venues ==
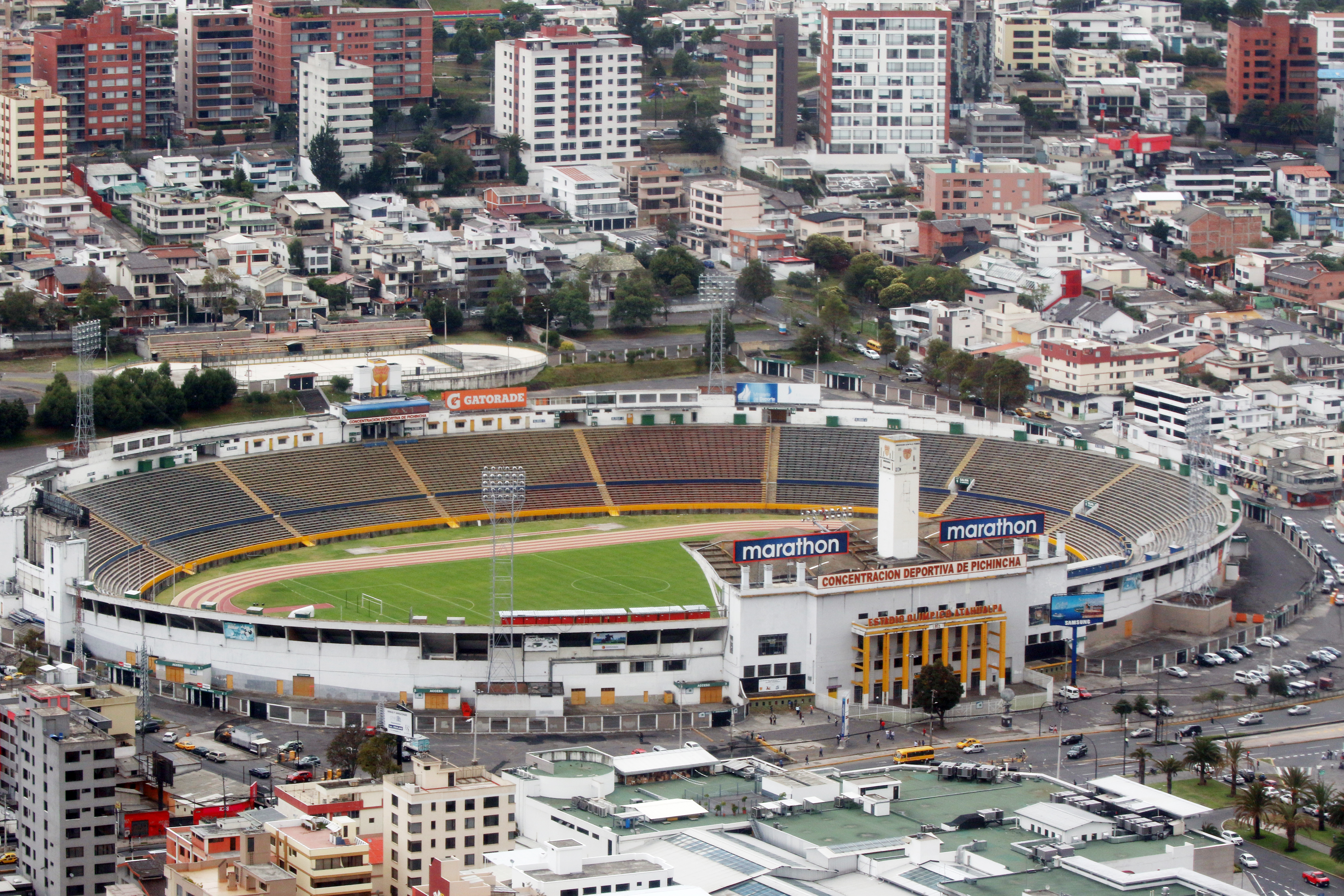
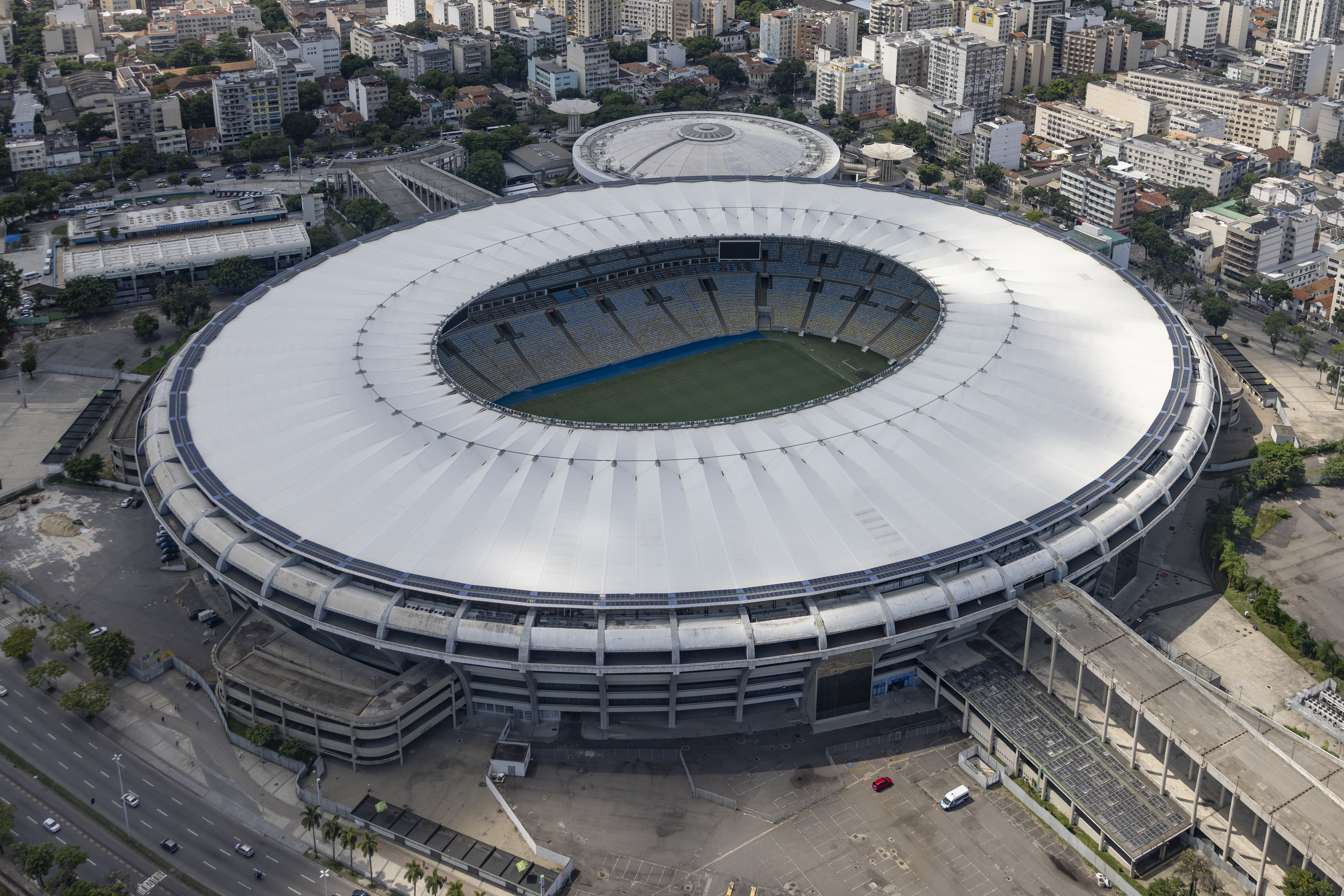
Estadio Olímpico Atahualpa in Quito (left), and Maracanã in Rio de Janeiro, venues for the series.

== Format ==
The Recopa Sudamericana was played on a home-and-away two-legged basis, with the Copa Libertadores champions hosting the second leg. If tied on aggregate, the away goals rule would not be used, and 30 minutes of extra time would be played. If still tied after extra time, the penalty shoot-out would be used to determine the winner (Regulations Article 17).

== Matches ==
=== First leg ===
19 February 2020
20:30 UTC−5
First leg

Independiente del Valle (Ecuador)	2–2	(Brazil) Flamengo
Murillo 20'; Pellerano 90+1' (pen.)	Report	Bruno Henrique 65'; Pedro 85'

Estadio Olímpico Atahualpa, Quito
Attendance: 15,031
Referee: Leodán González (Uruguay)

**Independiente del Valle**	**Flamengo**

GK	30	(Ecuador) Jorge Pinos
RB	11	(Ecuador) Jhon Jairo Sánchez
CB	5	(Argentina) Richard Schunke
CB	2	(Ecuador) Luis Segovia
LB	15	(Ecuador) Beder Caicedo	(yellow card) 45+4'
CM	16	(Argentina) Cristian Pellerano (c)	(yellow card) 23'
CM	8	(Argentina) Lorenzo Faravelli		(substituted off) 79'
RW	23	(Ecuador) Fernando Guerrero	(yellow card) 48'	(substituted off) 61'
AM	21	(Ecuador) Alan Franco
LW	18	(Ecuador) Jacob Murillo
CF	7	(Panama) Gabriel Torres		(substituted off) 72'
Substitutes:
GK	1	(Ecuador) Wellington Ramírez
GK	25	(Ecuador) Hamilton Piedra
DF	3	(Argentina) Pablo Alvarado
DF	4	(Ecuador) Anthony Landázuri
DF	13	(Ecuador) Angello Peralta
DF	17	(Ecuador) Ángelo Preciado		(substituted on) 72'
MF	10	(Ecuador) Efrén Mera		(substituted on) 79'
MF	14	(Spain) Dani Nieto
FW	9	(Ecuador) Alejandro Cabeza	(yellow card) 86'	(substituted on) 61'
FW	19	(Ecuador) Johao Chávez
Manager:
(Spain) Miguel Ángel Ramírez

GK	1	(Brazil) Diego Alves
RB	13	(Brazil) Rafinha	(yellow card) 90+1'
CB	3	(Brazil) Rodrigo Caio		(substituted off) 84'
CB	2	(Brazil) Gustavo Henrique	(yellow card) 87'
LB	16	(Brazil) Filipe Luís	(yellow card) 78'
CM	5	(Brazil) Willian Arão
CM	8	(Brazil) Gerson	(yellow card) 19'
RW	7	(Brazil) Éverton Ribeiro
AM	10	(Brazil) Diego (c)		(substituted off) 46'
LW	14	(Uruguay) Giorgian De Arrascaeta
CF	27	(Brazil) Bruno Henrique		(substituted off) 68'
Substitutes:
GK	12	(Brazil) César
DF	6	(Brazil) Renê
DF	20	(Brazil) Matheus Dantas
DF	26	(Brazil) Matheus Thuler		(substituted on) 84'
DF	30	(Brazil) João Lucas
MF	15	(Brazil) Vinícius Souza
MF	18	(Brazil) Thiago Maia
FW	11	(Brazil) Vitinho		(substituted on) 46'
FW	19	(Brazil) Michael
FW	21	(Brazil) Pedro		(substituted on) 68'
FW	23	(Brazil) Pedro Rocha
FW	29	(Brazil) Lincoln
Manager:
(Portugal) Jorge Jesus

Assistant referees:
Nicolás Tarán (Uruguay)
Richard Trinidad (Uruguay)
Fourth official:
Kevin Ortega (Peru)
Video assistant referee:
Esteban Ostojich (Uruguay)
Assistant video assistant referees:
Víctor Carrillo (Peru)
Alexander Guzmán (Colombia)

Match rules:

- 90 minutes.
- Twelve named substitutes, of which up to three may be used.

=== Second leg ===
26 February 2020
21:30 UTC−3
Second leg

Flamengo (Brazil)	3–0	(Ecuador) Independiente del Valle
Gabriel Barbosa 19'; Gerson 62', 89'	Report

Maracanã, Rio de Janeiro
Attendance: 69,986
Referee: Fernando Rapallini (Argentina)

**Flamengo**	**Independiente del Valle**

GK	1	(Brazil) Diego Alves
RB	13	(Brazil) Rafinha
CB	2	(Brazil) Gustavo Henrique	(yellow card) 88'
CB	4	(Brazil) Léo Pereira
LB	16	(Brazil) Filipe Luís
RM	7	(Brazil) Éverton Ribeiro (c)		(substituted off) 88'
CM	5	(Brazil) Willian Arão	(red card) 23'
CM	8	(Brazil) Gerson	(yellow card) 15'
LM	14	(Uruguay) Giorgian De Arrascaeta		(substituted off) 75'
CF	9	(Brazil) Gabriel Barbosa
CF	21	(Brazil) Pedro		(substituted off) 27'
Substitutes:
GK	12	(Brazil) César
DF	6	(Brazil) Renê
DF	20	(Brazil) Matheus Dantas
DF	26	(Brazil) Matheus Thuler
DF	30	(Brazil) João Lucas
MF	10	(Brazil) Diego
MF	18	(Brazil) Thiago Maia		(substituted on) 27'
MF	25	(Paraguay) Robert Piris Da Motta
FW	11	(Brazil) Vitinho		(substituted on) 75'
FW	19	(Brazil) Michael		(substituted on) 88'
FW	23	(Brazil) Pedro Rocha
FW	29	(Brazil) Lincoln
Manager:
(Portugal) Jorge Jesus

GK	30	(Ecuador) Jorge Pinos
RB	17	(Ecuador) Ángelo Preciado
CB	5	(Argentina) Richard Schunke
CB	2	(Ecuador) Luis Segovia		(substituted off) 66'
LB	15	(Ecuador) Beder Caicedo		(substituted off) 55'
CM	16	(Argentina) Cristian Pellerano (c)
CM	8	(Argentina) Lorenzo Faravelli		(substituted off) 75'
RM	11	(Ecuador) Jhon Jairo Sánchez
AM	21	(Ecuador) Alan Franco	(yellow card) 79'
LM	18	(Ecuador) Jacob Murillo
CF	7	(Panama) Gabriel Torres
Substitutes:
GK	1	(Ecuador) Wellington Ramírez
GK	25	(Ecuador) Hamilton Piedra
DF	3	(Argentina) Pablo Alvarado
DF	4	(Ecuador) Anthony Landázuri
MF	10	(Ecuador) Efrén Mera
MF	14	(Spain) Dani Nieto		(substituted on) 75'
MF	23	(Ecuador) Fernando Guerrero		(substituted on) 55'
FW	9	(Ecuador) Alejandro Cabeza	(red card) 86'	(substituted on) 66'
FW	19	(Ecuador) Johao Chávez
Manager:
(Spain) Miguel Ángel Ramírez

Assistant referees:
Diego Bonfá (Argentina)
Gabriel Chade (Argentina)
Fourth official:
Facundo Tello (Argentina)
Video assistant referee:
Mauro Vigliano (Argentina)
Assistant video assistant referees:
Piero Maza (Chile)
Juan Belatti (Argentina)

**Match rules**

- 90 minutes.
- 30 minutes of extra time if tied on aggregate (away goals rule not applied).
- Penalty shoot-out if still tied on aggregate after extra time.
- Twelve named substitutes.
- Maximum of three substitutions, with a fourth allowed in extra time.

== See also ==
- 2020 Copa Libertadores final
- 2020 Copa Sudamericana final
