= Jefferson Orejuela =

Ecuadorian footballer (born 1993)

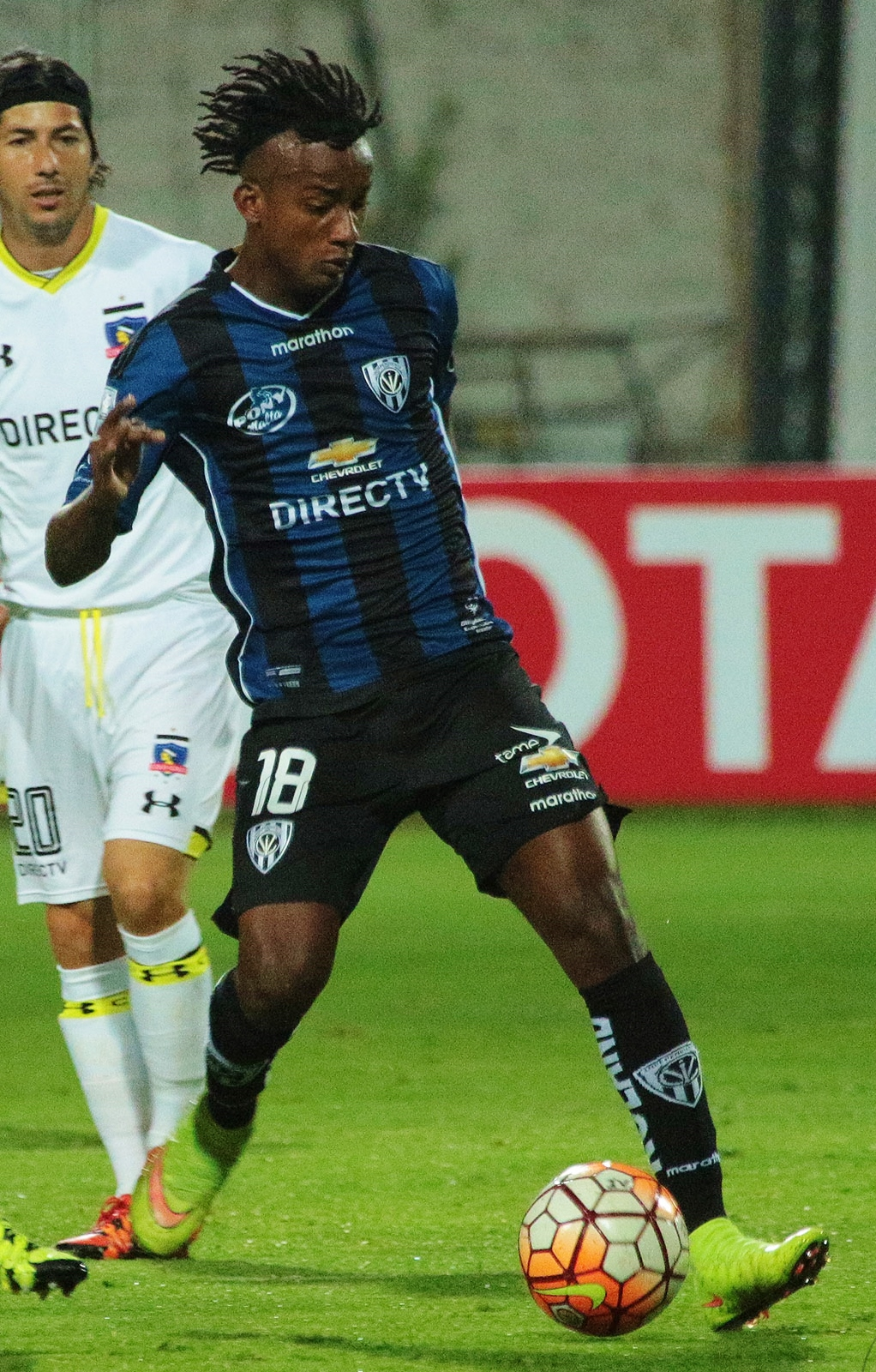
- Orejuela with Independiente DV in 2016

Personal information
- Full name: Jefferson Gabriel Orejuela Izquierdo
- Date of birth: 14 February 1993 (age 33)
- Place of birth: San Lorenzo, Ecuador
- Height: 1.79 m (5 ft 10 in)
- Position: Midfielder

Team information
- Current team: Cajamarca
- Number: 18

Youth career
- 2009–2010: Caribe Junior
- 2010: Norte América
- 2010–2011: Independiente DV

Senior career*
Years	Team	Apps	(Gls)
2012–2016	Independiente DV	155	(5)
2017–2019	Fluminense	21	(0)
2018–2019	→ LDU Quito (loan)	67	(0)
2020–2021	Querétaro	4	(0)
2020	→ Barcelona S.C. (loan)	16	(0)
2021	→ Emelec (loan)	20	(0)
2022	Guayaquil City	10	(0)
2024	Vinotinto	30	(0)
2025	Huracán Buceo		
2025	Fénix	2	(0)
2026	Paysandú		
2026–	Cajamarca	5	(0)

International career^{‡}
2016–	Ecuador	20	(0)
- * Club domestic league appearances and goals as of 13 March 2026 ‡ National team caps and goals as of 8 November 2019

Jefferson Gabriel Orejuela Izquierdo (born 14 February 1993) is an Ecuadorian professional footballer who plays as a central midfielder for Peruvian Primera División club Cajamarca.

== Career statistics ==
As of 13 March 2026.

Club	Season	League		Cup		Continental		Total	
Club	Season	Apps	Goals	Apps	Goals	Apps	Goals	Apps	Goals
Independiente DV	2012	24	1	—		0	0	24	1
Independiente DV	2013	30	1	—		4	0	34	1
Independiente DV	2014	25	1	—		7	0	32	1
Independiente DV	2015	39	1	—		2	0	41	1
Independiente DV	2016	37	1	—		16	1	53	2
Independiente DV	Total	155	5	0	0	29	1	184	6
Fluminense	2017	21	0	7	0	7	0	35	0
LDU Quito	2018	38	0	—		6	0	44	0
LDU Quito	2019	29	0	—		9	0	38	0
LDU Quito	Total	67	0	0	0	15	0	82	0
Barcelona S.C.	2020	16	0	—		3	0	19	0
Emelec	2021	20	0	1	0	7	0	28	0
Guayaquil City	2022	10	0	—		—		10	0
Vinotinto	2024	30	0	3	0	—		33	0
Huracán Buceo	2025	0	0	0	0	—		0	0
Fénix	2025	2	0	0	0	—		2	0
Cajamarca	2026	5	0	0	0	—		5	0
Career total		326	5	11	0	61	1	398	6

== Honours ==
LDU Quito

- Ecuadorian Serie A: 2018
- Copa Ecuador: 2019

Barcelona

- Ecuadorian Serie A: 2020

Cuniburo

- Ecuadorian Serie B: 2024
