= Aníbal Leguizamón =

Argentine footballer

Personal information
- Full name: Aníbal Andrés Leguizamón Espínola
- Date of birth: 10 January 1992 (age 34)
- Place of birth: Bernal Oeste, Argentina
- Height: 1.86 m (6 ft 1 in)
- Position: Centre-back

Team information
- Current team: Emelec
- Number: 2

Youth career
- Arsenal de Sarandí

Senior career*
Years	Team	Apps	(Gls)
2013–2014	Sportivo Barracas	12	(0)
2015–2017	Argentino	72	(4)
2017–2018	Defensores de Belgrano	25	(5)
2018–2020	Arsenal de Sarandí	21	(1)
2019–2020	→ Emelec (loan)	12	(0)
2020–2024	Emelec	113	(5)
2024–2026	Belgrano	24	(1)
2026–	Emelec	2	(0)
- * Club domestic league appearances and goals as of 17:12, 12 March 2026 (UTC)

Aníbal Andrés Leguizamón Espínola (born 10 January 1992), known as Aníbal Leguizamón, is an Argentine professional footballer who plays as a centre-back for Ecuadorian Serie A club Emelec.

== Career ==
Leguizamón had a youth spell with Arsenal de Sarandí, before beginning his senior career with Torneo Argentino B's Sportivo Barracas. In 2015, Leguizamón joined Argentino of Torneo Federal A. After four goals in seventy-two fixtures across two years, Leguizamón left Argentino in June 2017 after agreeing to sign for Defensores de Belgrano. He went on to score five goals against Gimnasia y Esgrima (2), Unión de Sunchales, Sarmiento and Estudiantes. On 20 June 2018, Leguizamón joined Primera B Nacional ex-club Arsenal de Sarandí. His professional debut arrived on 15 September during a defeat to Instituto.

In June 2019, Leguizamón headed to Ecuador with Serie A's Emelec on loan. He made his bow on 13 July against Fuerza Amarilla, scoring an own-goal within the first minute prior to coming off injured after seventeen. Upon returning from injury, Leguizamón made a total of twelve appearances across his twelve-month temporary spell and ended it as club captain. On 17 June 2020, Emelec activated their purchase option for Leguizamón.

On 21 August 2024, Leguizamón returned to Argentina to join Belgrano, signing a contract until 2026.

== Personal life ==
Leguizamón is the nephew of former footballers Darío Espínola and Oscar Espínola.

== Career statistics ==
As of 1 July 2020.

Club statistics
Club	Season	League			Cup		League Cup		Continental		Other		Total	
Club	Season	Division	Apps	Goals	Apps	Goals	Apps	Goals	Apps	Goals	Apps	Goals	Apps	Goals
Sportivo Barracas	2013–14	Torneo Argentino B	12	0	0	0	—		—		0	0	12	0
Defensores de Belgrano	2017–18	Torneo Federal A	25	5	3	0	—		—		6 (Note: Appearance(s) in the Torneo Federal A play-offs)	0	34	5
Arsenal de Sarandí	2018–19	Primera B Nacional	21	1	1	0	—		—		0	0	22	1
Emelec (loan)	2019	Serie A	8	0	2	1	—		—		0	0	10	1
Emelec (loan)	2020	Serie A	4	0	0	0	—		2 (Note: Appearance(s) in the Copa Sudamericana)	0	0	0	6	0
Emelec	2020	Serie A	0	0	0	0	—		0	0	0	0	0	0
Emelec	Total		12	0	2	1	—		2	0	0	0	16	1
Career total			70	6	6	1	—		2	0	6	0	84	7

== Honours ==
Arsenal de Sarandí

- Primera B Nacional: 2018–19
