= Édison Realpe =

Ecuadorian footballer (1996–2019)

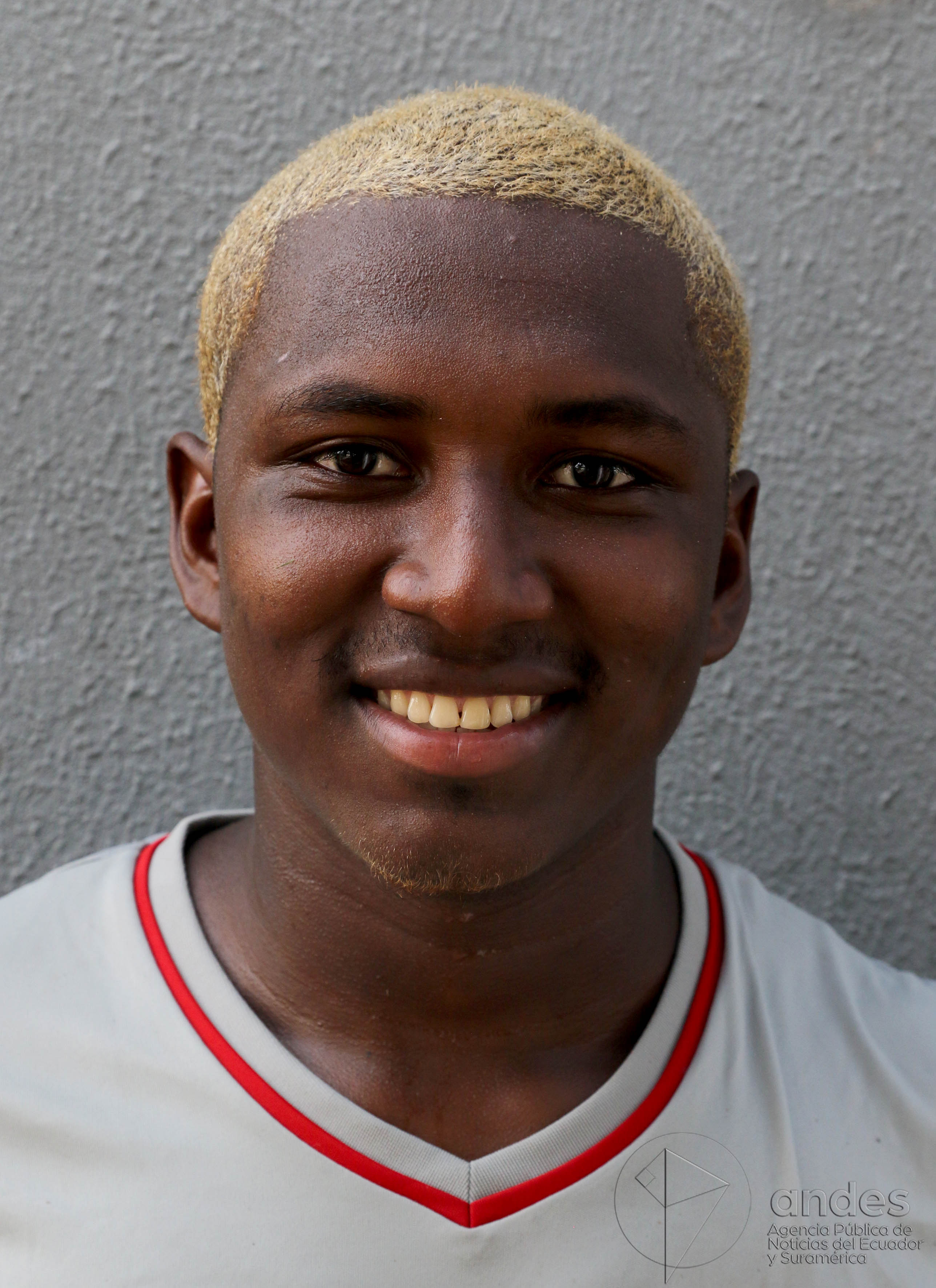
- Realpe in 2016

Personal information
- Full name: Édison Gabriel Realpe Solís
- Date of birth: 13 April 1996
- Place of birth: Esmeraldas, Ecuador
- Date of death: 22 December 2019 (aged 23)
- Place of death: Esmeraldas, Ecuador
- Position: Defender

Youth career
- 2012: Barcelona SC
- 2013: Clan Juvenil
- 2013: Guayaquil City

Senior career*
Years	Team	Apps	(Gls)
2014–2018	Guayaquil City	92	(0)
2018	→ L.D.U. Quito (loan)	15	(0)
2019	L.D.U. Quito	8	(0)
Total		115	(0)

International career
2013	Ecuador U17	3	(0)
2015	Ecuador U20	2	(0)
- * Club domestic league appearances and goals as of July 26, 2019

Édison Gabriel Realpe Solís (13 April 1996 – 22 December 2019) was an Ecuadorian footballer who played for L.D.U. Quito. He died in a car accident in Ecuador at the age of 23.

== Club career ==
Realpe began his career with Guayaquil City in 2014.

On 31 January 2018, Realpe was loaned out to L.D.U. Quito for the 2018 season. After the loan spell ended, he signed permanently for the club.

== Career statistics ==
As of November 2, 2019

Club	Season	League		Cup		International		Total	
Club	Season	Apps	Goals	Apps	Goals	Apps	Goals	Apps	Goals
Guayaquil City	2014	36	0	—	—	—	—	36	0
Guayaquil City	2015	9	0	—	—	—	—	9	0
Guayaquil City	2016	24	0	—	—	—	—	24	0
Guayaquil City	2017	23	0	—	—	—	—	23	0
Guayaquil City	Total	92	0	—	—	—	—	92	0
L.D.U. Quito	2018	15	0	—	—	1	0	16	0
L.D.U. Quito	2019	8	0	3	0	0	0	11	0
L.D.U. Quito	Total	23	0	3	0	1	0	27	0
Career total		115	0	3	0	1	0	119	0

== Honours ==
LDU Quito

- Ecuadorian Serie A: 2018
- Copa Ecuador: 2019
