= Leonel Nazareno =

Ecuadorian footballer (born 1994)

Personal information
- Full name: Leonel Romario Nazareno Delgado
- Date of birth: 5 August 1994 (age 32)
- Place of birth: Quinindé, Ecuador
- Height: 1.94 m (6 ft 4 1/2 in)
- Position: Goalkeeper

Team information
- Current team: Libertad
- Number: 45

Youth career
- 2010–2015: L.D.U. Quito

Senior career*
Years	Team	Apps	(Gls)
2016–2020	L.D.U. Quito	29	(0)
2022–2023	Cumbayá	26	(0)
2025–	Libertad	10	(0)
- * Club domestic league appearances and goals as of 20 August 2025

Leonel Nazareno is an Ecuadorian football player who plays as a goalkeeper for his club Libertad.

== Early life ==
Leonel at age 16 almost ruminated on a career in boxing and basketball, but chose to play football instead. As second-tallest player in his team, he said his tall stature was an advantage, especially in sports.

== Career ==
Due to starting goalkeeper Daniel Viteri not being able to play, Leonel Nazareno made his senior team debut in a game where the opposition was S.D. Aucas.

== Honours ==
LDU Quito

- Ecuadorian Serie A: 2018
- Copa Ecuador: 2019
- Supercopa Ecuador: 2020
