= Darío Espínola =

Argentine footballer

Personal information
- Full name: Ludovino Darío Espínola Alegre
- Date of birth: 15 September 1973 (age 53)
- Place of birth: Posadas, Argentina
- Height: 1.82 m (6 ft 0 in)
- Position: Right back

Team information
- Current team: Arsenal de Sarandí (interim)

Youth career
- Argentino de Quilmes

Senior career*
| Years | Team | Apps | (Gls) |
| 1992–1993 | Argentino de Quilmes | | |
| 1993–2010 | Arsenal de Sarandí | 406 | (15) |
| 2010–2011 | Defensa y Justicia | 25 | (0) |

Managerial career
- 2016–: Arsenal de Sarandí (reserves)
- 2021: Arsenal de Sarandí (interim)
- 2023: Arsenal de Sarandí (interim)
- 2023–: Arsenal de Sarandí (interim)
- * Club domestic league appearances and goals

Ludovino Darío Espínola Alegre, known as Darío Espínola, is an Argentine football manager and former player who played as a right back. He is the current interim manager of Arsenal de Sarandí.

He is nicknamed "Cafu" after the famous Brazilian rightback.

== Career ==
Espínola started his playing career in 1992 with Argentino de Quilmes. In 1993, he joined Arsenal de Sarandí where he remained for 16 years, making him one of the club's longest serving players and the player with the 2nd most appearances in the history of the club with over 400 games in all competitions, behind Carlos Ruiz. The highlights of his career were the club's promotion to the Argentine Primera División in 2002 and the victory on the 2007 Copa Sudamericana.

In 2010 Espínola left Arsenal and joined second division side Defensa y Justicia.

== Personal life ==
Espínola is the brother of Oscar Espínola and uncle of Aníbal Leguizamón.

== Honours ==
| Season | Club | Title |
|---|---|---|
| 2007 | Arsenal de Sarandí | Copa Sudamericana |
