= Romario Caicedo =

Ecuadorian footballer (born 1990)

Personal information
- Full name: Romario Javier Caicedo Ante
- Date of birth: 23 May 1990 (age 36)
- Place of birth: Eloy Alfaro, Ecuador
- Height: 1.84 m (6 ft 0 in)
- Position: Midfielder

Team information
- Current team: Emelec
- Number: 14

Senior career*
Years	Team	Apps	(Gls)
2010–2016	Olmedo	158	(23)
2016–2017	Fuerza Amarilla	37	(3)
2017–	Emelec	270	(20)

International career^{‡}
2017–	Ecuador	2	(0)
- * Club domestic league appearances and goals as of 22 March 2026 ‡ National team caps and goals as of 14 November 2022

Romario Javier Caicedo Ante (born 23 May 1990) is an Ecuadorian footballer who plays for C.S. Emelec.

Having joined Emelec in 2017 from Fuerza Amarilla S.C. he has since signed a contract extension to stay at Emelec until 2025.

He was capped by the Ecuador national football team in a friendly against Trinidad and Tobago.

== Honours ==
Olmedo

- Ecuadorian Serie B: 2013

Emelec

- Ecuadorian Serie A: 2017
