= Nicolás Freire =

Argentine footballer

Personal information
- Full name: Nicolás Omar Freire Gomez
- Date of birth: 18 February 1994 (age 32)
- Place of birth: Santa Lucía, Argentina
- Height: 1.87 m (6 ft 2 in)
- Position: Centre-back

Team information
- Current team: Libertad

Youth career
- –2012: CAI
- 2012–2013: Argentinos Juniors

Senior career*
Years	Team	Apps	(Gls)
2013–2017	Argentinos Juniors	93	(4)
2017–2019	Torque	0	(0)
2017–2018	→ PEC Zwolle (loan)	18	(1)
2018	→ Palmeiras (loan)	0	(0)
2019	→ L.D.U. Quito (loan)	7	(3)
2019–2026	Pumas UNAM	119	(5)
2023–2024	→ Olympiacos (loan)	4	(0)
2024	→ Inter Miami (loan)	10	(0)
2025–2026	→ Independiente (loan)	11	(1)
2026–	Libertad	0	(0)
- * Club domestic league appearances and goals as of 17:36, 6 June 2026 (UTC)

Nicolás Omar Freire Gomez (born 18 February 1994) is an Argentine professional footballer who plays as a centre-back for APF División de Honor club Libertad.

== Career ==
Freire is a youth exponent from CAI and Argentinos Juniors. He joined the Argentinos first-team in July 2012, making his debut during the 2012–13 season.

In 2017, Freire left Argentinos to join Uruguayan Segunda División side Torque. He was immediately loaned out to PEC Zwolle of the Eredivisie.

On 26 June 2018 Freire was loaned to Palmeiras for a one-year deal.

Freire joined Major League Soccer club Inter Miami on a season-long loan on 23 January 2024. On 18 May he suffered a season-ending anterior cruciate ligament (ACL) injury.

On 1 January 2025, Freire would come back to Argentina joining Independiente for a season-long loan.

== Personal life ==
Born in Argentina, Freire is of Spanish descent and holds dual citizenship.

== Honours ==
Palmeiras

- Campeonato Brasileiro Série A: 2018

L.D.U. Quito

- Copa Ecuador: 2019

Inter Miami

- Supporters' Shield: 2024
