= Oscar Espínola =

Paraguayan footballer (born 1976)

Personal information
- Date of birth: 10 May 1976 (age 50)
- Place of birth: Guarape, Paraguay
- Height: 1.82 m (6 ft 0 in)
- Position: Defender

Senior career*
Years	Team	Apps	(Gls)
1995–2003	Arsenal de Sarandí	158	(13)
2003	UA Maracaibo	6	(0)
2004	Universidad de Concepción	3	(0)
2004	Chacarita Juniors	9	(0)
2005–2006	Oriente Petrolero	48	(4)
2006	Potosí	14	(0)
2007	Destroyers	32	(6)
2008	Deportes Quindío	5	(1)
2008–2009	CD Morón	17	(0)
2011–2012	Gimnasia y Esgrima de (CDU)	14	(0)
2015–2017	Argentino de Quilmes	48	(1)
Total		354	(25)
- * Club domestic league appearances and goals

Oscar Espínola (born 10 May 1976) is a Paraguayan/Argentine footballer who last played for Argentino de Quilmes of the Tercera División Argentina.

== Teams ==
- (Argentina) Arsenal de Sarandí 1995–2003
- (Venezuela) UA Maracaibo 2003
- (Chile) Universidad de Concepción 2004
- (Argentina) Chacarita Juniors 2004
- (Bolivia) Oriente Petrolero 2005–2006
- (Bolivia) Real Potosí 2006
- (Bolivia) Destroyers 2007
- (Colombia) Deportes Quindío 2008
- (Argentina) CD Morón 2008–2009
- (Argentina) Gimnasia y Esgrima (CDU) 2011–2012
- (Argentina) Argentino de Quilmes 2015–2017

== Personal life ==
Espínola is the brother of Darío Espínola and uncle of Aníbal Leguizamón.
