= Ignacio Avilés =

Uruguayan-Chilean footballer (born 1992)

Personal information
- Full name: Ignacio Lautaro Avilés Rodríguez
- Date of birth: May 23, 1992 (age 34)
- Place of birth: Montevideo, Uruguay
- Height: 1.80 m (5 ft 11 in)
- Position: Midfielder

Youth career
- Danubio

Senior career*
Years	Team	Apps	(Gls)
2011–2014	Danubio	13	(0)
2014	→ Miramar Misiones (loan)	8	(0)
2014–2016	Villa Española	50	(0)
2017	Progreso	24	(0)
2018–2019	Fuerza Amarilla	13+	(1+)
2020–2021	San Marcos	24	(0)
2021	Cerrito	21	(1)
2022–2023	Unión San Felipe	47	(0)
2024	Colón FC	22	(0)
2025	Durazno	–	(–)
2025	Africando SC	–	(–)

International career^{‡}
2009	Uruguay U17	7	(0)
- * Club domestic league appearances and goals as of 22 February 2024 ‡ National team caps and goals as of 9 November 2009

Ignacio Lautaro Avilés Rodríguez (born May 23, 1992), is an Uruguayan–Chilean footballer who plays as a midfielder.

== Club career ==
After playing for clubs in his native country, on 2018 he joined Ecuadorian Serie B side Fuerza Amarilla, getting promotion to 2019 Serie A and being immediately relegated to 2020 Serie B. So, on 2020 he moved to Chile using his dual nationality and joined Primera B side San Marcos de Arica.

In 2021 he returned to his native country and joined Cerrito, which was recently promoted to Uruguayan Primera División.

In 2022–23, he played for Chilean club Unión San Felipe.

In 2024, he returned to Uruguay and signed with Colón FC in the second level.

== International career ==
He represented Uruguay U17 at the 2009 South American U-17 Championship – where Uruguay reached the third place – and at the 2009 FIFA U-17 World Cup.

== Personal life ==
Due to his father is Chilean, he holds dual nationality – Uruguayan and Chilean – along with his younger brother Joaquín, who is a professional footballer that has taken part in a training microcycle of Chile U20.
