= 2019 Copa Ecuador =

Copa de la FEF 2019

Tournament details
- Country: Ecuador
- Dates: 10 November 2018 – 16 November 2019
- Teams: 48

Final positions
- Champions: LDU Quito (1st title)
- Runners-up: Delfín

Tournament statistics
- Matches played: 98
- Goals scored: 252 (2.57 per match)
- Top goal scorer(s): Rodrigo Aguirre; Alexis Domínguez (4 goals each)

The 2019 Copa Ecuador was the second edition of the Copa Ecuador, Ecuador's domestic football cup. It began with the first round on 10 November 2018 and concluded with its double-legged final on 10 and 16 November 2019. LDU Quito were the winners, beating Delfín on away goals after tying 3–3 on aggregate score. They would have qualified for the 2020 Copa Sudamericana, but since they had already qualified for international competition through their league performance as well as the runners-up and both semifinalists, the berth was reallocated to the ninth-placed team of the league, El Nacional.

== Format ==
The competition involved 48 teams and was divided into seven rounds. The first round was played by 22 teams from the provincial associations (20 provincial champions and 2 invitees) and 2 amateur teams, which were drawn into 12 two-legged ties. The 12 winners qualified for the second round, where they were drawn into six two-legged ties with the winners advancing to the third round.

In the third round, the six winners from the previous round were joined by the 16 Serie A and 10 Serie B teams, who played in 16 two-legged ties with the winners advancing to the round of 16, from where the competition advanced to the quarterfinals, semifinals, and final.

== Prizes ==
The champions of this edition earned the right to compete in the 2020 Copa Sudamericana, taking the Ecuador 4 berth. In case the champions were already qualified for the Copa Libertadores or Copa Sudamericana through their league performance, the berth would be transferred to the runners-up, the semifinalists, or the next best team of the league not yet qualified for either competition.

== Schedule ==
| Round | Draw date | First leg | Second leg |
|---|---|---|---|
| First round | 30 October 2018 | 10–14 November 2018 | 16–21 November 2018 |
| Second round | 30 October 2018 | 23–28 November 2018 | 1–5 December 2018 |
| Third round | 2 April 2019 | 24 April – 9 May 2019 | 14 May – 19 June 2019 |
| Round of 16 | 2 April 2019 | 2–17 July 2019 | 23 July – 8 August 2019 |
| Quarterfinals | 2 April 2019 | 14 August – 8 September 2019 | 18–25 September 2019 |
| Semifinals | 2 April 2019 | 2–23 October 2019 | 30 October 2019 |
| Finals | 2 April 2019 | 10–16 November 2019 | |

== Teams ==
48 clubs took part in this edition of the Copa Ecuador: 16 from the Serie A, 8 from the Serie B, 20 from the Segunda Categoría, 2 amateur teams and Deportivo Quito and Everest, both invited by the Ecuadorian Football Federation based on their historical records.

=== Serie A ===
- América de Quito
- Aucas
- Barcelona
- Delfín
- Deportivo Cuenca
- El Nacional
- Emelec
- Fuerza Amarilla
- Guayaquil City
- Independiente del Valle
- LDU Quito
- Macará
- Mushuc Runa
- Olmedo
- Técnico Universitario
- Universidad Católica

=== Serie B ===
- Clan Juvenil
- Gualaceo
- LDU Loja
- LDU Portoviejo
- Manta
- Orense
- Puerto Quito
- Santa Rita

=== Segunda Categoría ===
- Águilas
- Alianza Cotopaxi (Note: Alianza Cotopaxi and Duros del Balón (later renamed as Independiente Juniors and Atlético Porteño, respectively) received byes to the third round following their promotion to Serie B at the end of the 2018 season.)
- Alianza de Guano
- América de Ambato
- Anaconda
- Atlético Portoviejo
- Audaz Octobrino
- Brasilia
- Chicos Malos
- Deportivo Morona
- Dunamis
- Duros del Balón
- ESPOLI
- Imbabura
- Insutec
- La Gloria
- Mineros
- San Francisco
- Toreros
- Valle Catamayo

=== Amateur teams ===
- San Pedro
- Spartak

=== Invited teams ===
- Deportivo Quito
- Everest

== First round ==
- Teams entering this round: 20 teams from Segunda Categoría, 2 amateur teams and 2 invited teams.

| Team 1 | Agg. | Team 2 | 1st leg | 2nd leg |
West Zone
| Águilas | 1–3 | Brasilia | 0–2 | 1–1 |
| Duros del Balón | 0–2 | Toreros | 0–1 | 0–1 |
| San Francisco | 4–4 (a) | Audaz Octobrino | 4–3 | 0–1 |
| Valle Catamayo | 2–12 | La Gloria | 1–9 | 1–3 |
| Everest | 2–6 | Insutec | 0–3 | 2–3 |
| San Pedro | 1–8 | Atlético Portoviejo | 0–2 | 1–6 |
East Zone
| Dunamis | 4–3 | Chicos Malos | 3–1 | 1–2 |
| ESPOLI | 2–2 (3–4 p) | Anaconda | 2–0 | 0–2 |
| Alianza Cotopaxi | 5–4 | Imbabura | 3–0 | 2–4 |
| Alianza de Guano | 6–1 | Deportivo Morona | 2–0 | 4–1 |
| América de Ambato | 2–2 (a) | Deportivo Quito | 2–1 | 0–1 |
| Mineros | 4–0 | Spartak | 2–0 | 2–0 |

Source: FEF

== Second round ==
| Team 1 | Agg. | Team 2 | 1st leg | 2nd leg |
West Zone
| Brasilia | 0–1 | Toreros | 0–0 | 0–1 |
| Audaz Octobrino | 3–3 (6–7 p) | La Gloria | 2–1 | 1–2 |
| Insutec | 6–3 | Atlético Portoviejo | 4–3 | 2–0 |
East Zone
| Anaconda | 5–2 | Dunamis | 3–1 | 2–1 |
| Alianza Cotopaxi | 1–5 | Alianza de Guano | 1–3 | 0–2 |
| Deportivo Quito | 3–1 | Mineros | 2–0 | 1–1 |

Source: FEF

Note: Deportivo Quito qualified for the third round, however they were excluded from the competition due to their suspension for failing to pay its creditors. They were replaced by Mineros, as the next best team in the aggregate table of the competition.

== Third round ==
The third round of the competition was held from 24 April to 19 June 2019, with teams in Serie A and Serie B entering at this stage. The draw for this stage of the competition was held on 2 April 2019.

| Team 1 | Agg. | Team 2 | 1st leg | 2nd leg |
|---|---|---|---|---|
| LDU Quito | 5–0 | La Gloria | 5–0 | 0–0 |
| Mineros | 1–3 | Barcelona | 1–1 | 0–2 |
| Olmedo | 2–3 | Alianza de Guano | 1–0 | 1–3 |
| Santa Rita | 4–1 | Fuerza Amarilla | 1–0 | 3–1 |
| Guayaquil City | 7–3 | Clan Juvenil | 6–1 | 1–2 |
| Anaconda | 1–5 | El Nacional | 1–1 | 0–4 |
| Aucas | 4–0 | Toreros | 2–0 | 2–0 |
| Independiente del Valle | 1–1 (a) | Orense | 1–1 | 0–0 |
| Atlético Porteño | 2–5 | Macará | 1–2 | 1–3 |
| Independiente Juniors | 3–1 | Universidad Católica | 2–0 | 1–1 |
| Técnico Universitario | 5–1 | LDU Loja | 3–0 | 2–1 |
| Gualaceo | 0–2 | Deportivo Cuenca | 0–1 | 0–1 |
| América de Quito | 6–2 | LDU Portoviejo | 4–0 | 2–2 |
| Manta | 0–6 | Mushuc Runa | 0–2 | 0–4 |
| Emelec | 4–0 | Puerto Quito | 2–0 | 2–0 |
| Insutec | 1–2 | Delfín | 1–2 | 0–0 |

== Bracket ==
Round of 16
Guayaquil City | 0 | 0 | 0 (4)
Aucas (p) | 0 | 0 | 0 (5)
Alianza de Guano | 0 | 1 | 1
LDU Quito | 0 | 5 | 5
Macará | 2 | 0 | 2
Técnico Universitario | 1 | 2 | 3
América de Quito | 0 | 2 | 2
Emelec | 2 | 2 | 4
Orense | 1 | 0 | 1
El Nacional (a) | 1 | 0 | 1
Barcelona (a) | 1 | 1 | 2
Santa Rita | 0 | 2 | 2
Independiente Juniors (p) | 1 | 1 | 2 (3)
Deportivo Cuenca | 1 | 1 | 2 (2)
Delfín | 2 | 0 | 2
Mushuc Runa | 0 | 1 | 1

Quarterfinals
Aucas | 0 | 0 | 0 (2)
LDU Quito (p) | 0 | 0 | 0 (4)
Técnico Universitario | 1 | 0 | 1
Emelec | 0 | 2 | 2
El Nacional | 1 | 0 | 1
Barcelona (a) | 1 | 0 | 1
Independiente Juniors | 2 | 0 | 2
Delfín | 3 | 1 | 4

Semifinals
LDU Quito (p) | 2 | 0 | 2 (5)
Emelec | 0 | 2 | 2 (4)
Barcelona | 4 | 0 | 4
Delfín (a) | 1 | 3 | 4

Finals
LDU Quito (a) | 2 | 1 | 3
Delfín | 0 | 3 | 3

== Round of 16 ==
| Team 1 | Agg. | Team 2 | 1st leg | 2nd leg |
|---|---|---|---|---|
| Alianza de Guano | 1–5 | LDU Quito | 0–0 | 1–5 |
| Guayaquil City | 0–0 (4–5 p) | Aucas | 0–0 | 0–0 |
| Macará | 2–3 | Técnico Universitario | 2–1 | 0–2 |
| América de Quito | 2–4 | Emelec | 0–2 | 2–2 |
| Barcelona | 2–2 (a) | Santa Rita | 1–0 | 1–2 |
| Orense | 1–1 (a) | El Nacional | 1–1 | 0–0 |
| Independiente Juniors | 2–2 (3–2 p) | Deportivo Cuenca | 1–1 | 1–1 |
| Delfín | 2–1 | Mushuc Runa | 2–0 | 0–1 |

== Quarterfinals ==
| Team 1 | Agg. | Team 2 | 1st leg | 2nd leg |
|---|---|---|---|---|
| Aucas | 0–0 (2–4 p) | LDU Quito | 0–0 | 0–0 |
| Técnico Universitario | 1–2 | Emelec | 1–0 | 0–2 |
| El Nacional | 1–1 (a) | Barcelona | 1–1 | 0–0 |
| Independiente Juniors | 2–4 | Delfín | 2–3 | 0–1 |

== Semifinals ==
| Team 1 | Agg. | Team 2 | 1st leg | 2nd leg |
|---|---|---|---|---|
| LDU Quito | 2–2 (5–4 p) | Emelec | 2–0 | 0–2 |
| Barcelona | 4–4 (a) | Delfín | 4–1 | 0–3 |

== Finals ==
10 November 2019
16:00

| LDU Quito | 2–0 | Delfín |
|---|---|---|
| Aguirre 54' (pen.); Chicaiza 78' |

Estadio Rodrigo Paz Delgado, Quito
Referee: Luis Quiroz

16 November 2019
15:00

| Delfín | 3–1 | LDU Quito |
|---|---|---|
| López 3'; Garcés 74', 90' (pen.) | | Aguirre 44' |

Estadio Jocay, Manta
Referee: Roddy Zambrano

Tied 3–3 on aggregate, LDU Quito won on away goals.

Champions

1st title

== Top goalscorers ==
| Rank | Name | Club | Goals |
|---|---|---|---|
| 1 | (Uruguay) Rodrigo Aguirre | LDU Quito | 4 |
| 1 | (Argentina) Alexis Domínguez | Independiente Juniors | 4 |
| 3 | (Ecuador) Daniel Angulo | Emelec | 3 |
| 3 | (Ecuador) Carlos Garcés | Delfín | 3 |
| 3 | (Ecuador) José Lugo | Alianza de Guano | 3 |
| 3 | (Colombia) Cristian Martínez Borja | LDU Quito | 3 |
| 3 | (Ecuador) Jorge Luis Palacios | Mushuc Runa | 3 |
| 3 | (Ecuador) Jacson Pita | Deportivo Cuenca | 3 |

Source: FEF
