= Bruno Vides =

Argentine footballer

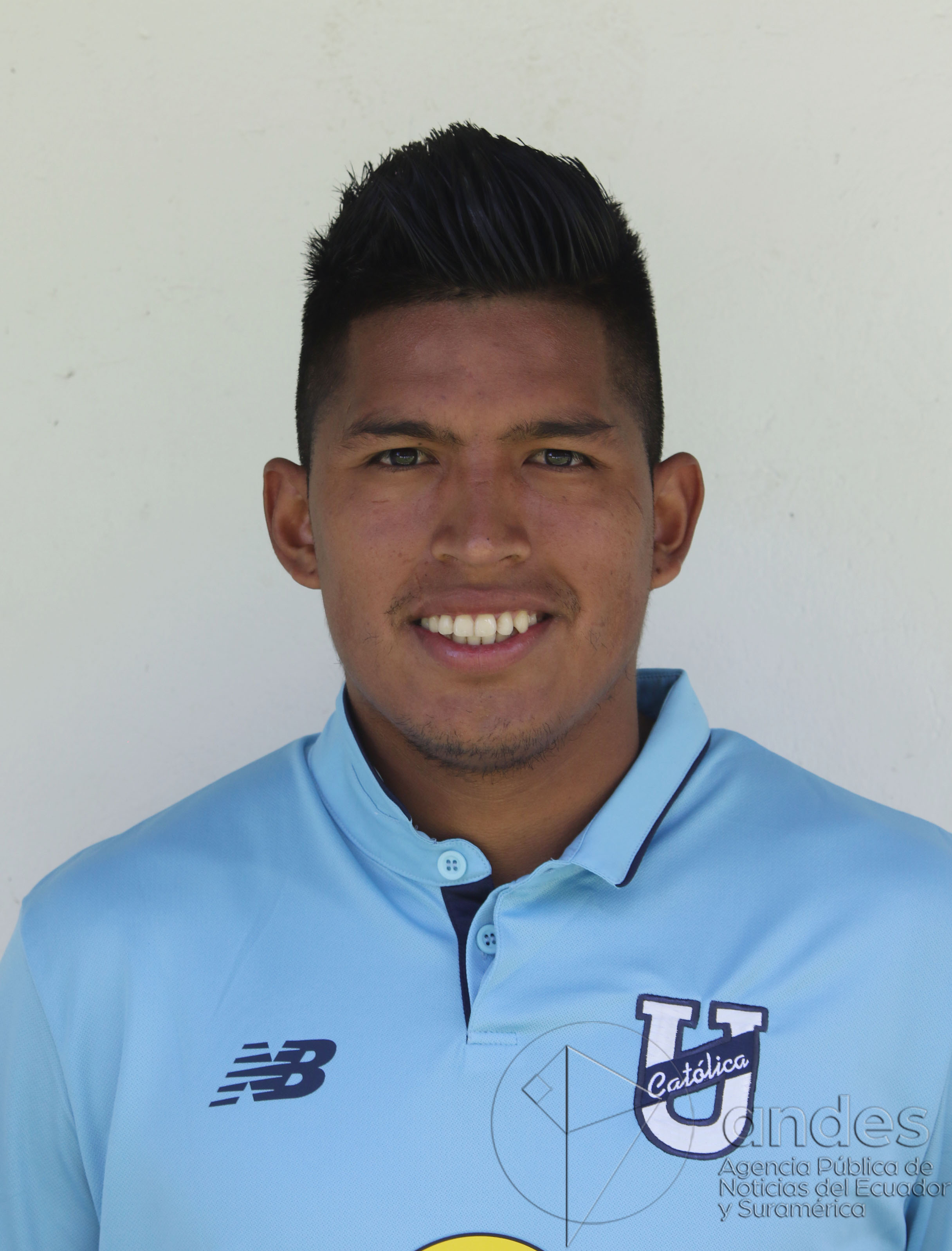
- Bruno Vides with Universidad Católica in 2016

Personal information
- Full name: Bruno Leonel Vides
- Date of birth: 20 February 1993 (age 33)
- Place of birth: Salta, Argentina
- Height: 1.78 m (5 ft 10 in)
- Position: Forward

Youth career
- Juventud Antoniana
- Lanús

Senior career*
Years	Team	Apps	(Gls)
2011–2019	Lanús	31	(2)
2014–2015	→ Deportes Copiapó (loan)	33	(15)
2015–2016	→ Universidad Católica (loan)	32	(18)
2016	→ Sarmiento de Junín (loan)	6	(0)
2017	→ Emelec (loan)	36	(12)
2019–2021	Universidad Católica	49	(20)
2021	Orense	10	(2)
2022	Huracán	2	(0)
2022	Danubio	5	(0)
2024	Cumbayá	16	(8)
2025	GV San José	11	(4)
2025	Zamora	13	(2)
2026	Unión San Felipe	8	(1)
- * Club domestic league appearances and goals as of 29 October 2026

Bruno Leonel Vides (born 20 February 1993) is an Argentine footballer who plays as a forward.

== Career ==
On 23 December 2025, Vides signed with Chilean club Unión San Felipe. He was released in October 2026 after an incident in a training.

== Titles ==
- Lanús 2013 (Copa Sudamericana)
