= Pablo Alvarado =

Argentine footballer

Personal information
- Full name: Pablo Andrés Alvarado
- Date of birth: 27 February 1986 (age 40)
- Place of birth: El Calafate, Argentina
- Height: 1.80 m (5 ft 11 in)
- Position: Centre back

Team information
- Current team: Palestino
- Number: 2

Youth career
- C.A.I
- San Lorenzo

Senior career*
Years	Team	Apps	(Gls)
2005–2016	San Lorenzo	75	(2)
2009	→ Belgrano (loan)	27	(0)
2014–2016	→ Racing Club (loan)	11	(0)
2016	→ Olimpo (loan)		
2016–2017	Godoy Cruz	11	(0)
2017	Defensa y Justicia	12	(0)
2018–2020	Unión La Calera	49	(2)
2020	→ Independiente del Valle (loan)	12	(0)
2021–	Palestino	14	(0)

International career
2003	Argentina U17	11	(0)
- * Club domestic league appearances and goals as of 30 August 2021

Pablo Andrés Alvarado (born 27 February 1986 in El Calafate, Santa Cruz) is an Argentine footballer who plays as a defender for Palestino.

== Career ==
Alvarado came through the youth system at C.A.I in Comodoro Rivadavia before being signed by San Lorenzo in 2004.

Alvarado has established himself as a regular first team player for San Lorenzo, demonstrating great versatility by playing in defence, on the right wing and in central midfield. In 2007, he helped the club win the Clausura tournament.

== Honours ==
San Lorenzo

- Argentine Primera División: 2007 Clausura, 2013 Inicial

== International career ==
Alvarado represented the Argentina national under-17 football team, but has yet to receive a call up to a more senior level.
