= José Ayoví =

Ecuadorian footballer (born 1991)

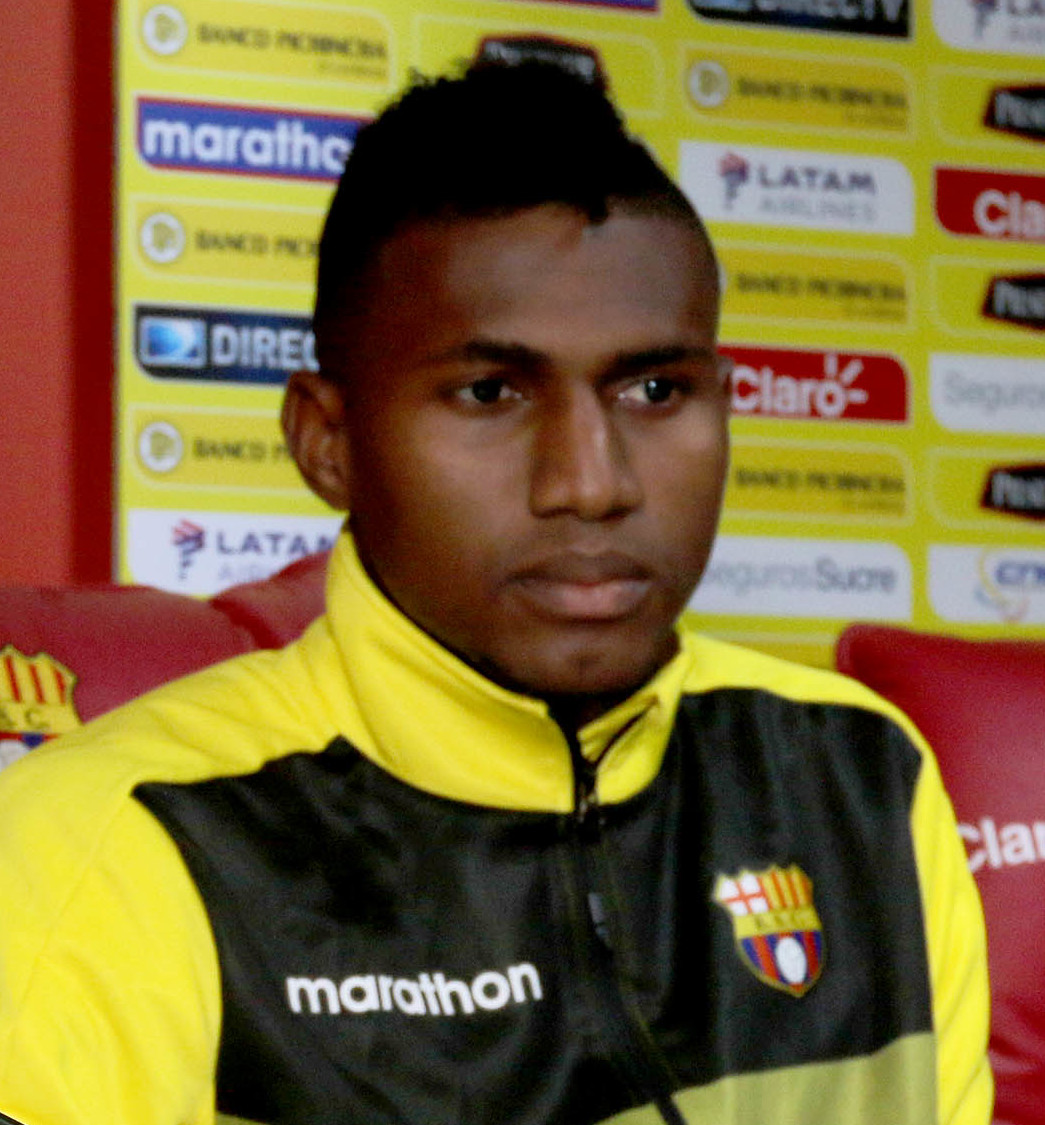

Personal information
- Full name: José Manuel Ayoví Plata
- Date of birth: 6 December 1991 (age 34)
- Place of birth: Atacames, Ecuador
- Height: 1.88 m (6 ft 2 in)
- Position: Forward

Youth career
- 2006–2008: Tacito OrtizUrriola
- 2009: Norte América

Senior career*
Years	Team	Apps	(Gls)
2009	Municipal Cañar	3	(1)
2010–2011	Independiente del Valle	49	(8)
2012–2013	Barcelona	53	(5)
2014	Dorados de Sinaloa	9	(0)
2015	→ Club Tijuana (loan)	6	(0)
2015–2018	Cafetaleros	54	(3)
2016	→ Chiapas (loan)	11	(0)
2017	→ Barcelona (loan)	37	(3)
2018	→ Barcelona (loan)	8	(1)
2019–2021	LDU Quito	33	(3)
2020	→ Guayaquil City (loan)	20	(0)
2021	Mushuc Runa	28	(3)
2022	Comunicaciones	6	(0)
2023–2025	Shijiazhuang Gongfu	77	(8)
- * Club domestic league appearances and goals as of 11:41, 18 February 2022 (UTC)

José Manuel Ayoví Plata (born December 6, 1991) is an Ecuadorian professional footballer.

== Club career ==
On 10 March 2023, Ayoví joined China League One club Shijiazhuang Gongfu. On 29 February 2024, Ayoví a new two-year contract extension with Shijiazhuang Gongfu.

== Honours ==
Cafetaleros de Tapachula

- Ascenso MX: Clausura 2018
