= Rodrigo Aguirre =

Uruguayan footballer (born 1994)

Personal information
- Full name: Rodrigo Sebastián Aguirre Soto
- Date of birth: 1 October 1994 (age 32)
- Place of birth: Montevideo, Uruguay
- Height: 1.82 m (6 ft 0 in)
- Position: Striker

Team information
- Current team: Tigres UANL
- Number: 17

Youth career
- Liverpool Montevideo

Senior career*
Years	Team	Apps	(Gls)
2011–2014	Liverpool Montevideo	57	(16)
2014–2019	Udinese	17	(1)
2014–2015	→ Empoli (loan)	1	(0)
2016	→ Perugia (loan)	17	(3)
2016–2017	→ Lugano (loan)	9	(1)
2017	→ Nacional (loan)	26	(13)
2018–2019	→ Botafogo (loan)	22	(1)
2019–2022	LDU Quito	42	(17)
2021–2022	→ Necaxa (loan)	38	(12)
2022–2024	Monterrey	59	(8)
2024–2026	America	51	(15)
2026–	Tigres UANL	19	(4)

International career^{‡}
2010–2011	Uruguay U17	23	(4)
2012–2013	Uruguay U20	18	(1)
2012	Uruguay U23	1	(0)
2024–	Uruguay	15	(5)
Medal record
Representing Uruguay
Men's Football
South American U-20 Championship
Third place	2013 Argentina
FIFA U-17 World Cup
Runner-up	2011 Mexico
South American U-17 Championship
Runner-up	2011 Ecuador
- * Club domestic league appearances and goals as of 6 September 2026 ‡ National team caps and goals as of 18 November 2026

Rodrigo Sebastián Aguirre Soto (born 1 October 1994) is a Uruguayan professional footballer who plays as a striker for Liga MX club Tigres UANL and the Uruguay national team.

== Club career ==
=== Early career ===
Aguirre, born and raised in Montevideo, started playing football at a young age. At twelve, he joined Liverpool Montevideo, where he signed his first contract and began his professional career.

He made his debut in 2011, playing three matches in the Apertura Tournament. He gradually earned more playing time, scoring his first goal in the 2012 Copa Sudamericana against Envigado.

=== Europe ===
In April 2014, Udinese paid around €4 million for the 19-year-old striker on a five-year contract. He was loaned to Empoli for the 2014-15 Serie A season, where injuries limited him to two appearances. Back at Udinese, he struggled for playing time, scoring only one goal. In 2016, he was loaned to Perugia (Serie B) and later to Lugano (Swiss Super League).

=== Return to South America ===
In January 2017, he joined Nacional on a six-month loan, where he rediscovered his form. His loan was extended, and in July he scored the winning goal in the Torneo Intermedio final against Defensor Sporting. A meniscus injury ended his year, and his loan expired on 31 December.

In January 2018, Aguirre joined Botafogo on loan. After fifteen scoreless games, he scored his only goal for the club against Sport Recife. He was named to ESPN Brasil's "Bola de Tata" (worst performers) for the Brasileirão. His loan was terminated in January 2019.

Shortly after leaving Botafogo, he signed with LDU Quito, where he went on to capture the Copa Ecuador and the Supercopa de Ecuador.

=== Mexico ===
In January 2021, Aguirre moved to Mexico to join Necaxa on loan. His performances earned him a permanent move to Monterrey in June 2022. Two years later, he signed with Club América, where he secured his first title in Mexican football, the Apertura 2024 championship. In February 2026, Aguirre was transferred to Tigres UANL.

== International career ==
=== Youth ===
As a youth international, Aguirre was part of Uruguayan squads at the 2011 South American Under-17 Football Championship, 2011 FIFA U-17 World Cup and the 2013 South American Youth Football Championship.

=== Senior ===
On 15 November 2024, Aguirre made his debut in a World Cup qualifier match against Colombia. He was featured in the starting line-up and scored his first goal during the second half in the 60th minute of the match. On 31 May 2026, he was named in Uruguay's 26-man squad for the 2026 FIFA World Cup.

== Career statistics ==
=== International ===
As of match played on 17 November 2026

Appearances and goals by national team and year
National team	Year	Apps	Goals
Uruguay	2024	2	1
Uruguay	2025	7	2
Uruguay	2026	6	2
Total		15	5

Scores and results list Uruguay's goal tally first, score column indicates score after each Aguirre goal.

List of international goals scored by Rodrigo Aguirre
No.	Date	Venue	Opponent	Score	Result	Competition
1	15 November 2024	Estadio Centenario, Montevideo, Uruguay	Colombia	2–1	3–2	2026 FIFA World Cup qualification
2	10 June 2025	Estadio Centenario, Montevideo, Uruguay	Venezuela	1–0	2–0	2026 FIFA World Cup qualification
3	4 September 2025	Estadio Centenario, Montevideo, Uruguay	Peru	1–0	3–0	2026 FIFA World Cup qualification
4	6 October 2026	Salt Lake Stadium, Kolkata, India	India	6–1	6–1	Friendly
5	17 November 2026	Estadio Domingo Burgueño, Maldonado, Uruguay	Dominican Republic	1–0	5–0	Friendly

== Honours ==
Botafogo

- Campeonato Carioca: 2018

Liga de Quito

- Copa Ecuador: 2019
- Supercopa Ecuador: 2020

América

- Liga MX: Apertura 2024
- Campeones Cup: 2024

Uruguay U17

- 2011 FIFA U-17 World Cup: Runner-Up
- 2011 South American Under-17 Football Championship: Runner-Up
