= Alexis Domínguez =

Argentine footballer

Personal information
- Full name: Alexis Andrés Domínguez Ansorena
- Date of birth: 30 October 1996 (age 30)
- Place of birth: Villa de Mayo, Argentina
- Height: 1.85 m (6 ft 1 in)
- Position: Centre-forward

Team information
- Current team: Quilmes

Youth career
- San Lorenzo

Senior career*
Years	Team	Apps	(Gls)
2016–2018	San Lorenzo	0	(0)
2016	→ Gimnasia Mendoza (loan)	1	(0)
2016–2017	→ Univ. San Martín (loan)	25	(3)
2018	Guayaquil City	14	(3)
2019	Independiente Juniors	34	(11)
2020	Estudiantes BA	7	(1)
2021–2026	Tristán Suárez	36	(15)
2021–2022	→ Gimnasia LP (loan)	14	(1)
2023–2024	→ Barracas Central (loan)	57	(7)
2025	→ Aldosivi (loan)	10	(0)
2026–	Quilmes	8	(2)
- * Club domestic league appearances and goals as of 17:48, 18 April 2026 (UTC)

Alexis Andrés Domínguez Ansorena (born 30 October 1996) is an Argentine professional footballer who plays as a centre-forward for Quilmes.

== Career ==
San Lorenzo were Domínguez's first senior club. On 1 January 2016, Domínguez joined Gimnasia y Esgrima on loan in Torneo Federal A. He made one appearance, versus Gutiérrez on 13 April, before returning to San Lorenzo. In the following August, Domínguez was loaned to Peruvian Primera División side Universidad San Martín. His professional debut arrived on 24 August against Ayacucho, which was followed by his first goal weeks later during a win over Alianza Lima. In total, he scored three times in twenty-five games across the 2016 and 2017 Peruvian Primera División campaigns.

On 17 July 2018, Domínguez completed a move to Guayaquil City of the Ecuadorian Serie A. He made his debut versus Universidad Católica on 24 July, playing sixty-eight minutes of a goalless draw. He departed on 31 December 2018, having netted three goals in fourteen Serie A fixtures. In February 2019, Domínguez remained in Ecuador to sign for Serie B's Independiente Juniors. In his opening six months, the centre-forward scored thirteen goals in twenty-three matches in all competitions. Domínguez left at the end of 2019, subsequently returning to Argentina with Primera B Nacional's Estudiantes.

In February 2021, Domínguez moved to Tristán Suárez. In July 2021, Domínguez joined Gimnasia La Plata on a 18-month loan deal for a fee around $2.750.000, with a purchase option of 60% of the pass for $275,000.

== Career statistics ==
As of 29 June 2020.

Club statistics
Club	Season	League			Cup		League Cup		Continental		Other		Total	
Club	Season	Division	Apps	Goals	Apps	Goals	Apps	Goals	Apps	Goals	Apps	Goals	Apps	Goals
San Lorenzo	2016	Argentine Primera División	0	0	0	0	—		0	0	0	0	0	0
San Lorenzo	2016–17	Argentine Primera División	0	0	0	0	—		0	0	0	0	0	0
San Lorenzo	2017–18	Argentine Primera División	0	0	0	0	—		0	0	0	0	0	0
San Lorenzo	Total		0	0	0	0	—		0	0	0	0	0	0
Gimnasia y Esgrima (loan)	2016	Torneo Federal A	1	0	0	0	—		—		0	0	1	0
Universidad San Martín (loan)	2016	Peruvian Primera División	11	2	—		—		—		0	0	11	2
Universidad San Martín (loan)	2017	Peruvian Primera División	14	1	—		—		—		0	0	14	1
Universidad San Martín (loan)	Total		25	3	—		—		—		0	0	25	3
Guayaquil City	2018	Serie A	14	3	0	0	—		—		0	0	14	3
Independiente Juniors	2019	Serie B	34	11	5	4	—		—		0	0	39	15
Estudiantes	2019–20	Primera B Nacional	6	1	0	0	—		—		0	0	6	1
Career total			80	18	5	4	—		0	0	0	0	85	22
