= José Luis Cazares =

Ecuadorian footballer (born 1991)

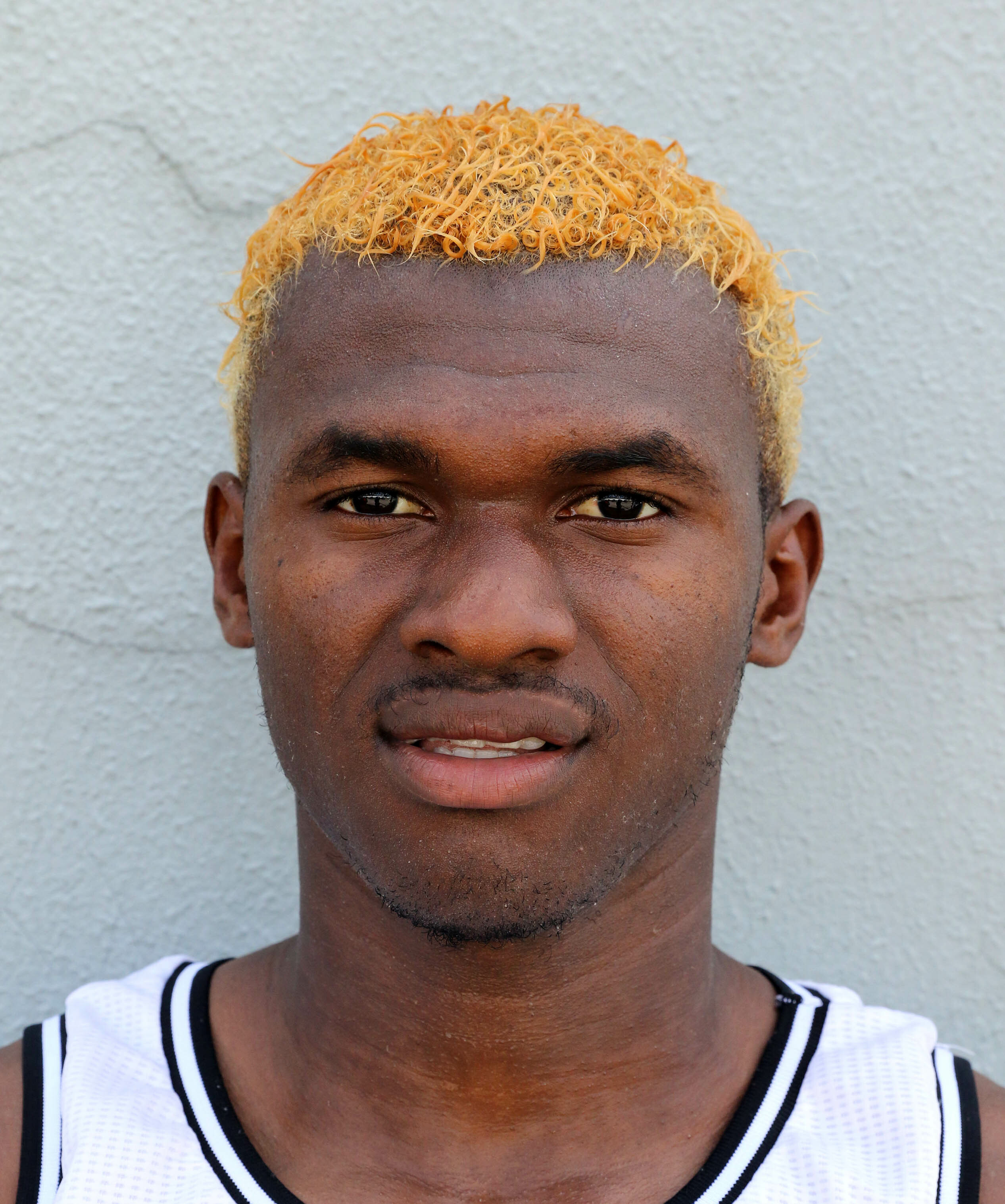

Personal information
- Full name: José Luis Cazares Quiñónez
- Date of birth: 14 May 1991 (age 35)
- Place of birth: Guayaquil, Ecuador
- Height: 1.74 m (5 ft 9 in)
- Position: Midfielder

Team information
- Current team: Club Deportivo Macará
- Number: 16

Youth career
- 2008–2009: Guayaquil City

Senior career*
Years	Team	Apps	(Gls)
2010–2016	Guayaquil City	278	(13)
2017–2018	Macará	71	(0)
2019	LDU Quito	10	(0)
2020	S.D. Aucas	0	(0)
2021–2022	9 de Octubre	0	(0)
2023	ADT	0	(0)
2024–	Técnico Universitario	0	(0)
- * Club domestic league appearances and goals as of September 1, 2019

José Luis Cazares Quiñónez (born 14 May 1991) is an Ecuadorian footballer who plays for Club Deportivo Macará.

== Club career ==
He began his career with Guayaquil City in 2010.

== Career statistics ==
As of September 1, 2019

Club	Season	League		Cup		International		Total	
Club	Season	Apps	Goals	Apps	Goals	Apps	Goals	Apps	Goals
Guayaquil City	2010	38	2	—	—	—	—	38	2
Guayaquil City	2011	38	2	—	—	—	—	38	2
Guayaquil City	2012	42	1	—	—	—	—	42	1
Guayaquil City	2013	42	0	—	—	—	—	42	0
Guayaquil City	2014	41	3	—	—	—	—	41	3
Guayaquil City	2015	42	5	—	—	—	—	42	5
Guayaquil City	2016	35	0	—	—	—	—	35	0
Guayaquil City	Total	278	13	—	—	—	—	278	13
Macará	2017	35	0	—	—	—	—	35	0
Macará	2018	36	0	—	—	2	0	38	0
Macará	Total	71	0	—	—	2	0	73	0
L.D.U. Quito	2019	10	0	2	0	2	0	14	0
Career total		359	13	2	0	4	0	365	13
