= Geovanny Nazareno =

Ecuadorian footballer (born 1988)

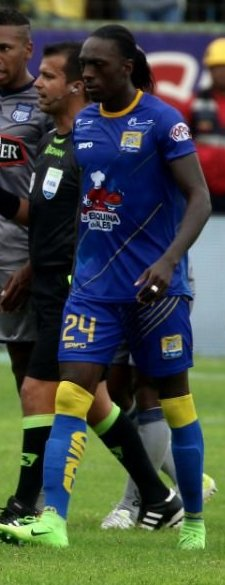

Personal information
- Full name: Geovanny Enrique Nazareno Simisterra
- Date of birth: 17 January 1988 (age 38)
- Place of birth: Nueva Loja, Sucumbíos, Ecuador
- Height: 1.77 m (5 ft 10 in)
- Position: Left wing back

Team information
- Current team: Club 9 de Octubre

Youth career
- 2005–2006: Barcelona SC

Senior career*
Years	Team	Apps	(Gls)
2005–2015	Barcelona SC	192	(6)
2006	→ Santa Rosa (loan)	9	(3)
2007	→ CS Patria (loan)	3	(0)
2008	→ Deportivo Quito (loan)	20	(0)
2015–2016	Zacatecas	19	(0)
2016–2017	Emelec	8	(0)
2017–2020	Delfín	3	(0)
2021	Deportivo Cuenca	2	(0)
2022–	Club 9 de Octubre	0	(0)

International career^{‡}
2008–	Ecuador	5	(0)
- * Club domestic league appearances and goals as of 16 March 2017 (UTC) ‡ National team caps and goals as of 12 February 2013

Geovanny Enrique Nazareno Simisterra (born January 17, 1988) is an Ecuadorian footballer currently playing for Club 9 de Octubre.

== Club career ==
Nazareno started with Caribe Junior. He was noticed by Barcelona and was transferred there permanently. In the 2008 season, Nazareno was loaned out to Deportivo Quito. He played in the Copa Sudamericana 2008 and the Copa Pilsener 2008 with them. However, in mid-November, Nazareno had signed two contracts with Dep. Quito and Barcelona. He was then sent to go back to Barcelona and play for them. He scored his first goal with Barcelona in a 5–0 win against LDU de Portoviejo.

== International career ==
Giovanny has been called up to a friendly match against Mexico on November 12, 2008.
