= Jacob Murillo =

Ecuadorian footballer (born 1993)

Personal information
- Full name: Jacob Israel Murillo Moncada
- Date of birth: 31 March 1993 (age 33)
- Place of birth: Chambo, Ecuador
- Height: 1.73 m (5 ft 8 in)
- Position: Winger

Team information
- Current team: Náutico
- Number: 16

Youth career
- 2005: Union del Carmen
- 2005: Selección de Chimborazo
- 2006–2007: Union del Carmen
- 2007: Selección de Chimborazo
- 2008–2010: Union del Carmen

Senior career*
Years	Team	Apps	(Gls)
2010–2016	Olmedo	209	(38)
2017	→ Delfín (loan)	33	(7)
2018	→ Estudiantes (LP) (loan)	4	(0)
2019	LDU Quito	14	(2)
2020–2021	Independiente del Valle	53	(11)
2021–	Náutico	1	(0)

International career^{‡}
2013	Ecuador U20	6	(0)
2017	Ecuador	2	(1)
- * Club domestic league appearances and goals as of 7 December 2019 ‡ National team caps and goals as of 30 May 2019

Jacob Israel Murillo Moncada (born 31 March 1993) is an Ecuadorian footballer who plays for Náutico as a winger.

== International goals ==
Scores and results list Ecuador's goal tally first.

#	Date	Venue	Opponent	Score	Result	Competition
1	26 July 2017	Estadio George Capwell, Guayaquil, Ecuador	Trinidad and Tobago	3–1	3–1	Friendly

== Honours ==
Olmedo

- Serie B: 2013

LDU Quito

- Copa Ecuador: 2019

Independiente del Valle

- Serie A: 2021
