= Estadio 9 de Mayo =

Multi-use stadium in Machala, Ecuador

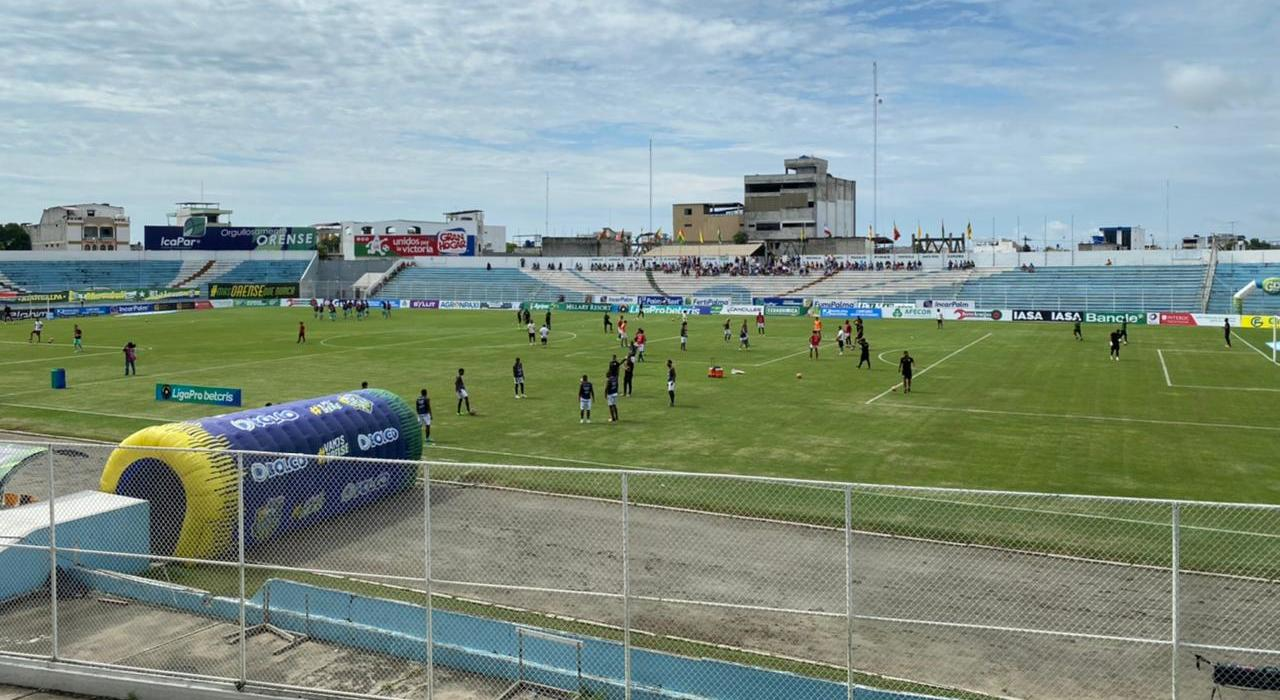
- Interactive map of Estadio 9 de Mayo
- Location: Machala, Ecuador
- Coordinates: 03°15′16″S 79°57′45″W
- Owner: Sports Federation of El Oro
- Capacity: 16,500
- Surface: grass

Construction
- Opened: May 9, 1939
- Renovated: 1970-1974; 1993
- Expanded: 1993

Tenants
- Audaz Octubrino; Fuerza Amarilla; Orense

Estadio 9 de Mayo is a multi-use stadium in Machala, Ecuador. It is currently used mostly for football matches and is the home stadium of Audaz Octubrino, Fuerza Amarilla and Orense. The stadium holds 16,500 spectators and opened in 1939.

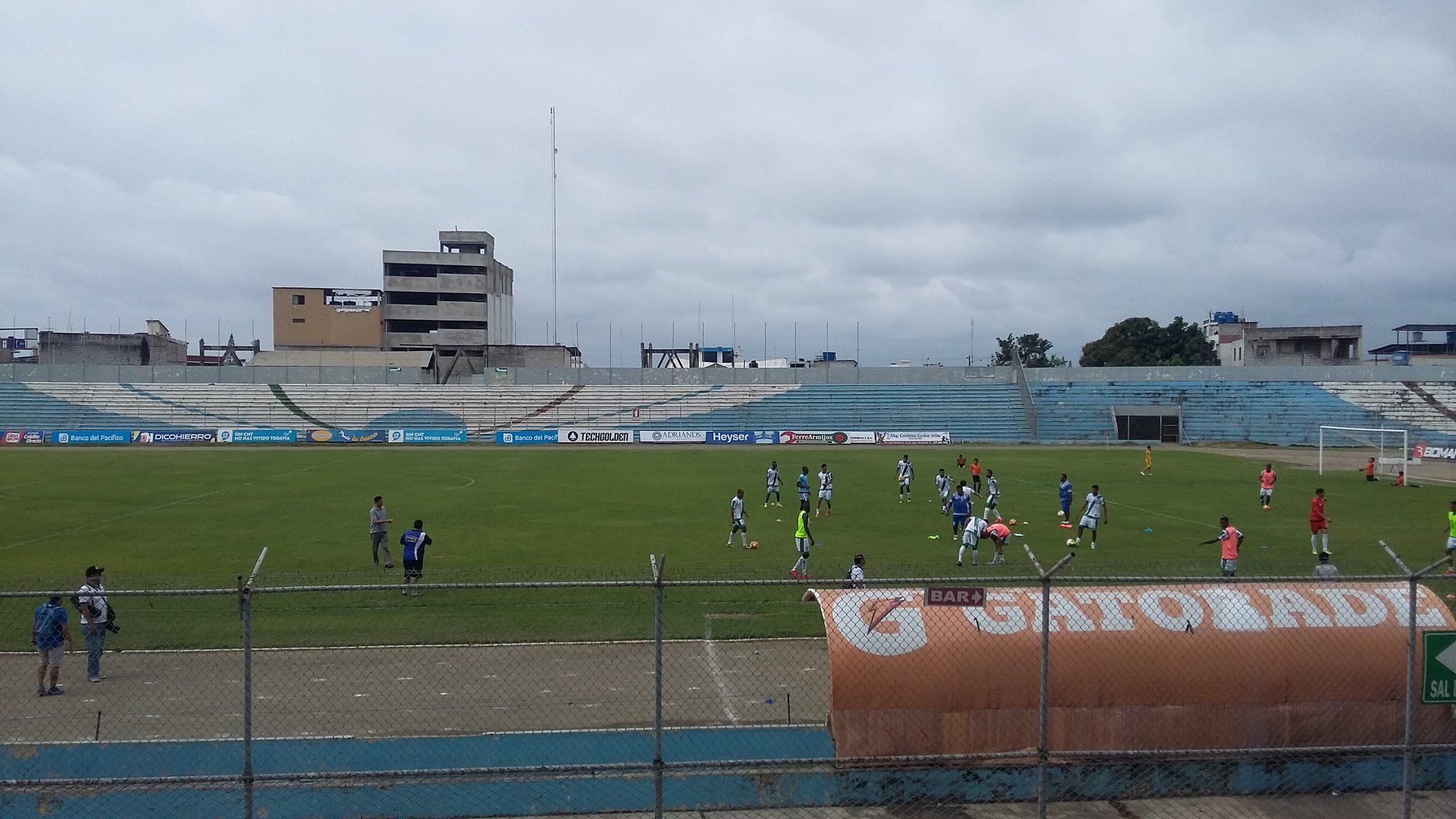
View from the tribunes
