= Andrés Chicaiza =

Ecuadorian footballer (born 1992)

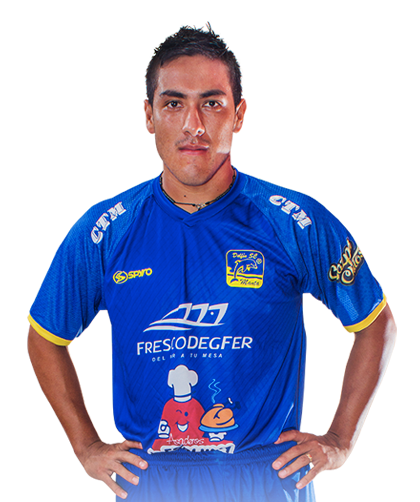
- Chicaiza with Delfín in 2017

Personal information
- Full name: Luis Andrés Chicaiza Morales
- Date of birth: 3 April 1992 (age 34)
- Place of birth: Otavalo, Ecuador
- Height: 1.72 m (5 ft 8 in)
- Position: Midfielder

Team information
- Current team: Delfín
- Number: 10

Youth career
- 2015–2017: Imbabura
- 2010–2011: El Nacional
- 2011: Mushuc Runa

Senior career*
Years	Team	Apps	(Gls)
2012	Mushuc Runa	14	(0)
2013	Imbabura	30	(8)
2014	LDU Quito	0	(0)
2015	Olmedo	22	(7)
2016	Técnico Universitario	36	(14)
2017–2018,2022–	Delfín	75	(20)
2019–	LDU Quito	26	(0)
2020	→ Universidad Católica (loan)	6	(2)
2021	→ Deportivo Cuenca (loan)	0	(0)

International career^{‡}
2019–	Ecuador	2	(0)
- * Club domestic league appearances and goals as of 21:00, 22 August 2020 (UTC) ‡ National team caps and goals as of June 24, 2019

Luis Andrés Chicaiza Morales (born 3 April 1992) is an Ecuadorian footballer who plays for Delfín on loan from Liga de Quito.

== Club career ==
He began his career with Mushuc Runa in 2012.

== International ==
He made his Ecuador national football team debut on 1 June 2019, in a friendly against Venezuela, as a starter.

== Career statistics ==
As of December 11, 2019

Club	Season	League		Cup		International		Total	
Club	Season	Apps	Goals	Apps	Goals	Apps	Goals	Apps	Goals
Mushuc Runa	2012	14	0	—	—	—	—	14	0
Mushuc Runa	Total	14	0	—	—	—	—	14	0
Imbabura	2013	30	8	—	—	—	—	30	8
Imbabura	Total	30	8	—	—	—	—	30	8
L.D.U. Quito	2014	0	0	—	—	—	—	0	0
L.D.U. Quito	Total	0	0	—	—	—	—	0	0
Olmedo	2015	22	7	—	—	—	—	22	7
Olmedo	Total	22	7	—	—	—	—	22	7
Técnico Universitario	2016	36	14	—	—	—	—	36	14
Técnico Universitario	Total	36	14	—	—	—	—	36	14
Delfín	2017	33	5	—	—	—	—	33	5
Delfín	2018	42	15	—	—	6	2	48	17
Delfín	Total	75	20	—	—	6	2	81	22
L.D.U. Quito	2019	26	0	8	3	6	1	40	4
L.D.U. Quito	Total	26	0	8	3	6	1	40	4
Career total		203	49	8	3	12	3	223	55
