= Daniel Angulo =

Ecuadorian footballer (born 1986)

Personal information
- Full name: Daniel Patricio Angulo Arroyo
- Date of birth: November 16, 1986 (age 39)
- Place of birth: Esmeraldas, Ecuador
- Height: 1.80 m (5 ft 11 in)
- Position: Forward

Youth career
- 2002: Esmeraldas Petrolero

Senior career*
Years	Team	Apps	(Gls)
2003	Deportivo Amistad	8	(3)
2005	Norte América	14	(6)
2006	Huracán	13	(10)
2007	Valencia	15	(7)
2008	Grecia	12	(7)
2008	Técnico Universitario	4	(0)
2009	Aucas	3	(0)
2010	Grecia	36	(15)
2011	Imbabura SC	10	(2)
2011	Rocafuerte	11	(4)
2012–2015	Independiente del Valle	107	(44)
2015–2016	Santa Fe	8	(1)
2016	LDU Quito	27	(6)
2017	Deportivo Pasto	5	(0)
2017–2018	CSA	5	(0)
2018	El Nacional	34	(6)
2019	Emelec	22	(6)
2020	R&F	0	(0)
2020–2021	Orense	26	(4)
2021–2022	Atlético Santo Domingo		

International career
2014–2015	Ecuador	4	(0)
- * Club domestic league appearances and goals as of 21:25, 7 February 2023 (UTC)

Daniel Patricio Angulo Arroyo (born 16 November 1986) is an Ecuadorian footballer who plays as a forward for Ecuadorian Serie A club Orense.

== Honours ==
Santa Fe

- Copa Sudamericana (1): 2015

CSA

- Campeonato Brasileiro Série C (1): 2017
- Campeonato Alagoano (1): 2018
