= Sergio López (footballer, born 1989) =

Argentine footballer

Personal information
- Full name: Sergio Daniel López
- Date of birth: 4 January 1989 (age 37)
- Place of birth: Lomas de Zamora, Argentina
- Height: 1.75 m (5 ft 9 in)
- Position: Midfielder

Team information
- Current team: Aucas

Senior career*
Years	Team	Apps	(Gls)
2000–2002	Temperley	92	(11)
2011–2014	Godoy Cruz	16	(1)
2013	→ Palestino (loan)	43	(12)
2015–2016	Unión Española	40	(5)
2016–2017	Deportes Temuco	21	(3)
2017–2018	Once Caldas	34	(6)
2018	Gimnasia de Mendoza	2	(0)
2019	Delfín	29	(9)
2020–	Aucas	26	(10)
2021	→ Barcelona SC (loan)	0	(0)
- * Club domestic league appearances and goals as of 22:12, 20 February 2021 (UTC)

Sergio Daniel López (born 4 January 1989) is an Argentine footballer currently playing for Ecuadorian team Aucas.
