= Fuerza Amarilla S.C. =

Ecuadorian football club

Fuerza Amarilla
- Full name: Club Deportivo Especializado Fuerza Amarilla Sporting Club
- Nicknames: La Banana Mecánica; La Avispa de Machala; El Mortífero; El Tractor Amarillo; Aurinegros; Carbonero; La Máquina Amarilla; La Fuerza de Dios
- Founded: 23 December 1999; 26 years ago
- Dissolved: 29 April 2022
- Ground: 9 de Mayo; Machala, Ecuador
- Capacity: 16,456
- Chairman: Marcos Abelardo Andrade
Home colours	Away colours	Third colours

Club Deportivo Especializado Fuerza Amarilla Sporting Club was an Ecuadorian football club based in Machala, Ecuador. Founded on 23 December 1999, the club played in the Ecuadorian Serie A. Its home games are played at Estadio 9 de Mayo, which has a capacity of 16,456 seats.

The club has participated in a CONMEBOL competition once, in the 2017 Copa Sudamericana. In that tournament, they were drawn in the first stage with Chilean club O'Higgins and beat them 2–1 on aggregate, after having a 1–0 deficit. In the next stage, they were eliminated by Colombian club Santa Fe 2–1 on aggregate.

== Honours ==
- Serie B
  - Runners-up (1): 2015
