= 2018 Liga Deportiva Universitaria de Quito season =

L.D.U. Quito
2018 season
- President: Guillermo Romero
- Manager: Pablo Repetto
- Stadium: Estadio Rodrigo Paz Delgado
- Serie A: Champions (11th title)
- Conmebol Sudamericana: Round of 16
- Top goalscorer: League: Juan Luis Anangonó (16 goals); All: Juan Luis Anangonó (19 goals)
- Highest home attendance: 35,804; (April 29 v. Emelec)
- Lowest home attendance: 2,541; (October 3 v. Universidad Católica)
- Average home league attendance: 14,305
Home colours	Away colours	Third colours

Liga Deportiva Universitaria de Quito's 2018 season was the club's 88th year of existence, the 65th year in professional football, and the 57th in the top level of professional football in Ecuador.

== Club ==
=== Personnel ===
President: Guillermo Romero
Honorary President: Rodrigo Paz
President of the Executive Commission: Esteban Paz
President of the Football Commission: Patricio Torres
Sporting manager: Santiago Jácome

=== Coaching staff ===
Manager: Pablo Repetto
Assistant manager: Óscar Quagliatta, Franklin Salas
Physical trainer: Roberto Teixeira
Goalkeeper trainer: Luis Preti

=== Kits ===
Supplier: Puma
Sponsor(s): Chevrolet, Discover, Pilsener

Home
Home
alternate 1
Home 2
Home 2
alternate 1
Home 2
alternate 2

Home 3
Home 3
alternate 1
Home 3
alternate 2
Away
Away
alternate 1
Third

Type	Shirt	Shorts	Socks	Additional information
Home	White	White	White	
Home alternate 1	White	Blue	White	Worn on September 19 (vs Deportivo Cali)
Home 2	White with black sleeves	Black	Black	Special edition Copa Libertadores 10th anniversary kit; worn on July 15 (vs Deportivo Cuenca) and July 29 (vs Emelec)
Home 2 alternate 1	White with black sleeves	Grey	Grey	Worn on July 21 (vs Delfín)
Home 2 alternate 2	White with black sleeves	Black	White	Worn on August 4 (vs El Nacional)
Home 3	White with red diagonal band	Blue	Blue	Special edition Club Universitario 100th anniversary kit; worn on October 20 (vs Deportivo Cuenca), November 5 (vs Guayaquil City), November 24 (vs El Nacional), November 28 (vs Aucas) and December 16 (vs Emelec)
Home 3 alternate 1	White with red diagonal band	White	White	Worn on December 2 and December 12 (vs Emelec)
Home 3 alternate 2	White with red diagonal band	Blue	White	Worn on December 8 (vs Delfín)
Away	Grey	Grey	Grey	
Away alternate 1	Grey	Grey	White	Worn on September 15 (vs Macará)
Third	Blue	Blue	Blue	

== Squad information ==
Num	Pos	Nat.	Player	Age	Since	App	Goals	Notes
1	GK	ECU	Leonel Nazareno	23	2015	22	0	
2	DF	ARG	Hernán Pellerano	33	2018	0	0	
4	DF	ECU	Horacio Salaberry	30	2017	33	3	
5	MF	ECU	Jefferson Intriago	21	2014	108	1	
6	DF	ECU	Aníbal Chalá	21	2017	19	0	
7	MF	ECU	Édison Vega	27	2016	71	1	
8	FW	ECU	Djorkaeff Reasco	18	2016	8	2	
9	FW	URU	Gastón Rodríguez	25	2018	0	0	
10	MF	ECU	Jonathan Borja	23	2018	0	0	
11	MF	ECU	Anderson Julio	21	2016	35	4	
12	GK	ECU	Erik Viveros	21	2017	0	0	
13	MF	ECU	Jordy Alcívar	18	2018	0	0	
14	DF	ECU	José Quintero	27	2015	93	8	
15	DF	ECU	Franklin Guerra	25	2018	0	0	
16	MF	ECU	Julio Angulo	27	2018	0	0	
17	FW	ECU	Juan Luis Anangonó	28	2016	69	22	Previously with the club in '14
18	MF	ECU	Jefferson Orejuela	24	2018	0	0	
19	FW	COL	Cristian Martínez	29	2018	0	0	
20	DF	ECU	Christian Cruz	25	2018	0	0	
21	DF	ECU	Andersson Ordóñez	23	2018	0	0	
22	GK	ARG	Adrián Gabbarini	32	2018	0	0	
23	MF	ECU	Fernando Guerrero	28	2018	35	1	Previously with the club from '16–'17
24	DF	ECU	Kevin Minda	19	2018	0	0	
25	DF	ECU	Édison Realpe	21	2018	0	0	
26	MF	ECU	Jhojan Julio	19	2016	30	3	
27	MF	ECU	Édgar Villena	20	2018	0	0	
28	MF	ECU	William Ocles	19	2017	1	1	
29	DF	ECU	Gregori Anangonó	19	2018	0	0	
30	DF	ECU	Renny Folleco	20	2018	0	0	

Note: Caps and goals are of the national league and are current as of the beginning of the season.

=== Winter transfers ===
Players In
Name	Nat	Pos	Age	Moving from
Adrián Gabbarini	ARG	GK	32	Olimpo (Argentina) (loan)
Gregori Anangonó	ECU	DF	19	Promoted from reserve team
Christian Cruz	ECU	DF	25	Guayaquil City (Ecuador) (loan)
Renny Folleco	ECU	DF	20	Promoted from reserve team
Franklin Guerra	ECU	DF	25	El Nacional (Ecuador)
Kevin Minda	ECU	DF	19	Promoted from reserve team
Andersson Ordóñez	ECU	DF	23	Eintracht Frankfurt (Germany) (loan)
Hernán Pellerano	ARG	DF	33	Olimpia (Paraguay) (loan)
Édison Realpe	ECU	DF	21	Guayaquil City (Ecuador) (loan)
Jordy Alcívar	ECU	MF	18	Promoted from reserve team
Jonathan Borja	ECU	MF	23	El Nacional (Ecuador) (loan)
Fernando Guerrero	ECU	MF	28	Chapecoense (Brazil) (loan)
Jefferson Orejuela	ECU	MF	24	Fluminense (Brazil) (loan)
Édgar Villena	ECU	MF	20	Promoted from reserve team
Gastón Rodríguez	URU	FW	25	Peñarol (Uruguay) (loan)

Players Out
Name	Nat	Pos	Age	Moving to
Daniel Viteri	ECU	GK	36	Orense SC (Ecuador)
Norberto Araujo	ECU	DF	39	Retired
Luis Cangá	ECU	DF	22	Delfín (Ecuador)
Édison Carcelén	ECU	DF	25	The Strongest (Bolivia)
John Narváez	ECU	DF	26	Melgar (Peru)
Henry Quiñónez	ECU	DF	24	Aucas (Ecuador)
Jonathan Betancourt	ECU	MF	22	Barcelona SC (Ecuador)
Álex Bolaños	ECU	MF	32	Delfín (Ecuador)
Sherman Cárdenas	COL	MF	28	Atlético Bucaramanga (Colombia)
Francisco Cevallos	ECU	MF	22	Lokeren (Belgium)
Jonathan González	ECU	MF	22	León (Mexico) (loan return)
Fernando Hidalgo	ECU	MF	32	Aucas (Ecuador)
Ronie Carrillo	ECU	FW	21	Universidad Católica (Ecuador)

=== Summer transfers ===
Players In
Name	Nat	Pos	Age	Moving from
Julio Angulo	ECU	MF	28	Club Tijuana (Mexico)
Cristian Martínez	COL	FW	30	América de Cali (Colombia)

Players Out
Name	Nat	Pos	Age	Moving to
Lucas Tagliapietra	BRA	DF	27	Al-Batin (Saudi Arabia)
Hernán Barcos	ARG	FW	34	Cruzeiro (Brazil)

== Competitions ==
Competition	Started round	Final position / round	First match	Last match
Serie A	First Stage	Champions	February 18	December 16
Copa Sudamericana	First Stage	Round of 16	April 10	September 19

=== Pre-season friendlies ===
January 27 Noche Blanca	L.D.U. Quito	1–0	Deportes Tolima	Quito
20:30 UTC−05:00	Barcos 62' (pen.)			Stadium: Estadio Rodrigo Paz Delgado; Attendance: 27,000; Referee: Vinicio Espinel

February 11 Tripleta de Confraternidad Seguros Sucre	El Nacional	3–4	L.D.U. Quito	Quito
14:15 UTC−05:00	Angulo 6'; Balda 59' (pen.); Gracia 68'		Barcos 23', 29'; A. Julio 26'; Borja 41'	Stadium: Estadio Olímpico Atahualpa; Attendance: 22,163; Referee: Diego Lara

=== Other friendlies ===
February 28	L.D.U. Quito	2–2 (3–2 p)	Phoenix Rising FC	Quito
19:30 UTC−05:00	Rodríguez 3'; Alcívar (yellow card) 41'; Anangonó 52'	Report	Drogba 55'; Farrell 83'	Stadium: Estadio Rodrigo Paz Delgado; Referee: Carlos Orbe
	Penalties
	Anangonó (penalty missed); Reasco (penalty scored); Salaberry (penalty scored); Alcívar (penalty missed); Barcos (penalty scored)		(penalty scored) Cortez; (penalty missed) Awako; (penalty missed) Riggi; (penalty scored) Johnson; (penalty missed) Fernández

=== Serie A ===
The 2018 season was Liga's 57th season in the Serie A and their 17th consecutive. The format was identical to the previous season.

==== First stage ====
Pos	Team	Pld	W	D	L	GF	GA	GD	Pts	Qualification
1	LDU Quito	22	14	4	4	32	18	+14	46	Qualification to Third stage and Copa Libertadores group stage
2	Barcelona	22	13	6	3	41	21	+20	45	
3	Universidad Católica	22	11	5	6	40	28	+12	38	
4	Emelec	22	11	4	7	34	27	+7	37	
5	Delfín	22	10	3	9	35	34	+1	33	

Source: FEF, Soccerway
Rules for classification: 1) Points, 2) Goal difference, 3) Goals for, 4) Away goals for, 5) Goals against, 6) Head-to-head record, 7) Penalty shootout.
If a penalty shootout is not possible: 7) Drawing of lots or playoff game.

Results summary

Overall								Home						Away					
Pld	W	D	L	GF	GA	GD	Pts	W	D	L	GF	GA	GD	W	D	L	GF	GA	GD
22	14	4	4	32	18	+14	46	8	2	1	20	9	+11	6	2	3	12	9	+3

Results by round

Round	1	2	3	4	5	6	7	8	9	10	11	12	13	14	15	16	17	18	19	20	21	22
Ground	A	H	A	H	H	A	H	A	H	A	H	A	H	A	H	A	H	A	A	H	A	H
Result	L	W	W	D	W	W	W	L	W	W	W	W	W	L	W	W	D	W	D	W	D	L
Position	11	6	4	4	4	3	2	3	2	2	2	1	1	1	1	1	1	1	1	1	1	1

Updated to match(es) played on July 15, 2018. Source: Competitive matches
A = Away; H = Home; W = Win; D = Draw; L = Loss

February 18 Round 1	Deportivo Cuenca	2–1	L.D.U. Quito	Cuenca
12:00 UTC−05:00	De La Cruz (yellow card) 18'; Rojas 55'; Cucco (yellow card) 62'; Bonfigli 75'	Report	Cruz (yellow card) 32'; A. Julio 51', (yellow card) 80'; Orejuela (yellow card) 62'; Ordóñez (yellow card) 87'	Stadium: Estadio Alejandro Serrano Aguilar; Attendance: 9,477; Referee: Daniel Salazar

February 26 Round 2	L.D.U. Quito	2–1	Guayaquil City	Quito
19:30 UTC−05:00	J. Julio 8'; Ordóñez (yellow card) 41'; Rodríguez 77'	Report	Dorregaray (yellow card) 25', (goal) 62' (pen.); García (yellow card) 82'	Stadium: Estadio Rodrigo Paz Delgado; Attendance: 8,322; Referee: Juan Carlos Albarracín

March 4 Round 3	Universidad Católica	1–2	L.D.U. Quito	Quito
12:00 UTC−05:00	Calderón 31'; Obando (yellow card) 67'; Mercado (yellow card) 83'	Report	J. Julio 2', (yellow card) 74'; Barcos 76'; Quintero (yellow card) 83'	Stadium: Estadio Olímpico Atahualpa; Attendance: 8,544; Referee: Luis Quiroz

March 11 Round 4	L.D.U. Quito	1–1	Aucas	Quito
12:00 UTC−05:00	Realpe (yellow card) 26'; Barcos (yellow card) 79'; Quintero (yellow card) 80'; Anangonó 90+3'	Report	Rizotto (yellow card) 13'; Valencia 64'; Lara (yellow card) 79'	Stadium: Estadio Rodrigo Paz Delgado; Attendance: 29,628; Referee: Omar Ponce

March 17 Round 5	L.D.U. Quito	4–0	Técnico Universitario	Quito
16:00 UTC−05:00	Barcos 34', 83'; Vélez 42' (o.g.); Rodríguez (yellow card) 45'; Quintero 79'	Report	Vélez (yellow card) 39'; Mora (yellow card) 39'; Armas (yellow card) 66'	Stadium: Estadio Rodrigo Paz Delgado; Attendance: 9,276; Referee: Carlos Orbe

March 25 Round 6	Emelec	0–1	L.D.U. Quito	Guayaquil
16:30 UTC−05:00	Guagua (yellow card) 34'	Report	Guerra (yellow card) 4'; Barcos 12', (yellow card) 44'; A. Julio (yellow card) 43' (yellow-red card) 44'; Gabbarini (yellow card) 66'	Stadium: Estadio George Capwell; Attendance: 27,079; Referee: Vinicio Espinel

April 1 Round 7	L.D.U. Quito	2–1	Independiente del Valle	Quito
12:00 UTC−05:00	Realpe (yellow card) 17'; Quintero (yellow card) 19'; Barcos 42' (pen.); Ordóñez (yellow card) 59'; Anangonó 81'	Report	Schunke (yellow card) 31'; Pellerano 45+1', (yellow card) 68'; León (yellow card) 56'	Stadium: Estadio Rodrigo Paz Delgado; Attendance: 24,015; Referee: Roddy Zambrano

April 14 Round 9	L.D.U. Quito	1–0	El Nacional	Quito
18:00 UTC−05:00	Batalla 7' (o.g.); Barcos (yellow card) 85'	Report	Montaño (yellow card) 28'; Garcés (yellow card) 78'	Stadium: Estadio Rodrigo Paz Delgado; Attendance: 18,134; Referee: Daniel Salazar

April 18 Round 8 (Postponed)	Delfín	2–1	L.D.U. Quito	Manta
19:30 UTC−05:00	Godoy (yellow card) 23'; Chicaiza 26'; Garcés 64'; Ortíz (yellow card) 85'	Report	Intriago (yellow card) 57'; Rodríguez (yellow card) 69', (goal) 73'; J. Julio (yellow card) 81'; Cruz (yellow card) 90+3'	Stadium: Estadio Jocay; Referee: Diego Lara

April 22 Round 10	Macará	0–1	L.D.U. Quito	Ambato
12:00 UTC−05:00	Miers (yellow card) 87'; Arboleda (red card) 90+4'	Report	Cruz (yellow card) 31'; Ordóñez (yellow card) 42'; Barcos 90'; Intriago (red card) 90+3'; Guerrero (yellow card) 90+3'	Stadium: Estadio Bellavista; Attendance: 10,272; Referee: Vinicio Espinel

April 29 Round 11	L.D.U. Quito	2–1	Barcelona SC	Quito
12:30 UTC−05:00	Quintero (yellow card) 8'; Ordóñez (yellow card) 30'; Guerrero 32'; A. Julio (yellow card) 40'; Orejuela (yellow card) 44'; Barcos 54' (pen.)	Report	Pineida (yellow card) 2'; Caicedo (yellow card) 45+1'; Dinenno (yellow card) 57'; Nahuelpán 69', (yellow card) 89'	Stadium: Estadio Rodrigo Paz Delgado; Attendance: 33,236; Referee: Luis Quiroz

May 4 Round 12	Barcelona SC	0–1	L.D.U. Quito	Guayaquil
19:45 UTC−05:00	Pineida (yellow card) 20'; Velasco (yellow card) 51'; Caicedo (yellow card) 58'	Report	Vega (yellow card) 20'; J. Julio (yellow card) 29'; Anangonó (yellow card) 58', (goal) 61'; Guerrero (yellow card) 77'; Gabbarini (yellow card) 80'	Stadium: Estadio Monumental Banco Pichincha; Attendance: 18,539; Referee: Omar Ponce

May 14 Round 13	L.D.U. Quito	2–1	Macará	Quito
19:15 UTC−05:00	J. Julio 25'; Intriago (yellow card) 59'; Barcos 71'; Quintero (yellow card) 84'	Report	Miers (yellow card) 10'; Arboleda (yellow card) 50'; Feraud (yellow card) 60'; Tévez 88'; Quiñónez (yellow card) 90+1'	Stadium: Estadio Rodrigo Paz Delgado; Attendance: 9,563; Referee: Roddy Zambrano

May 20 Round 14	El Nacional	2–1	L.D.U. Quito	Quito
12:00 UTC−05:00	Villalva 28'; Quiñónez (yellow card) 47'; Parrales 84' (pen.)	Report	Guerra (yellow card) 32'; A. Julio 45'	Stadium: Estadio Olímpico Atahualpa; Attendance: 20,117; Referee: Carlos Orbe

May 28 Round 15	L.D.U. Quito	3–0	Delfín	Quito
19:15 UTC−05:00	Luzarraga 21' (o.g.); Ordóñez (yellow card) 48'; Guerrero 69'; Rodríguez 74'	Report	Patta (yellow card) 49'; Piñatares (yellow card) 72'; Godoy (yellow card) 84'	Stadium: Estadio Rodrigo Paz Delgado; Attendance: 8,539; Referee: Juan Carlos Albarracín

June 2 Round 16	Independiente del Valle	2–3	L.D.U. Quito	Quito
12:00 UTC−05:00	Cangá (yellow card) 28'; Cabeza 45'; Mera 57'	Report	Orejuela (yellow card) 20'; Guerrero (yellow card) 28'; Barcos 34' (pen.); Ordóñez (yellow card) 71'; Rodríguez (yellow card) 86', (goal) 89'; Anangonó 88'	Stadium: Estadio Olímpico Atahualpa; Referee: Daniel Salazar

June 9 Round 17	L.D.U. Quito	1–1	Emelec	Quito
18:30 UTC−05:00	Quintero (yellow card) 43'; Rodríguez 60', (yellow card) 66'; Cruz (yellow card) 74'	Report	Mejía (yellow card) 20'; Lastra (yellow card) 20'; Johnson (yellow card) 35'; Pinillo (yellow card) 70'; Preciado 78' (pen.), (yellow card) 83'; Dreer (yellow card) 85'	Stadium: Estadio Rodrigo Paz Delgado; Attendance: 16,250; Referee: José Luis Espinel

June 15 Round 18	Técnico Universitario	0–1	L.D.U. Quito	Ambato
20:00 UTC−05:00	Mina (yellow card) 18'; Mora (yellow card) 27' (yellow-red card) 58'; Castro (yellow card) 80'; Hurtado (red card) 88'; Caicedo (yellow card) 90+3'	Report	A. Julio 5'; Orejuela (yellow card) 27'; Ordóñez (yellow card) 77' (yellow-red card) 78'; Intriago (yellow card) 90+6'	Stadium: Estadio Bellavista; Attendance: 7,181; Referee: Vinicio Espinel

June 23 Round 19	Aucas	0–0	L.D.U. Quito	Quito
15:30 UTC−05:00	Rizotto (yellow card) 18'; Hidalgo (yellow card) 21'; Hurtado (yellow card) 55'; Romero (yellow card) 86'	Report	Quintero (yellow card) 14'; J. Julio (yellow card) 30'; Barcos (yellow card) 88'	Stadium: Estadio Gonzalo Pozo Ripalda; Attendance: 9,816; Referee: Carlos Orbe

July 2 Round 20	L.D.U. Quito	2–1	Universidad Católica	Quito
19:15 UTC−05:00	Guerra 23'; A. Julio (yellow card) 57', (goal) 74'; Barcos (yellow card) 60'; Quintero (yellow card) 80'	Report	Martínez (yellow card) 21'; Oña (yellow card) 59'; De Los Santos 67'; Calderón (yellow card) 78'; Cifuente (yellow card) 90+3'	Stadium: Estadio Rodrigo Paz Delgado; Attendance: 17,500; Referee: Omar Ponce

July 7 Round 21	Guayaquil City	0–0	L.D.U. Quito	Guayaquil
16:00 UTC−05:00	Cabezas (yellow card) 32'; Quiñónez (yellow card) 55'	Report	Salaberry (yellow card) 24'; Vega (yellow card) 24'; Quintero (yellow card) 68'; Rodríguez (yellow card) 82'	Stadium: Estadio Christian Benítez Betancourt; Attendance: 3,162; Referee: Roddy Zambrano

July 15 Round 22	L.D.U. Quito	0–2	Deportivo Cuenca	Quito
15:00 UTC−05:00	Guerrero (yellow card) 32'; Realpe (yellow card) 55'; A. Julio (yellow card) 57'; Vega (yellow card) 64'	Report	Rojas (yellow card) 27', (goal) 69'; Cucco (yellow card) 31'; Cangá (yellow card) 42'; Carabalí (yellow card) 44'; De La Cruz 46', (yellow card) 74'; Heras (yellow card) 77'	Stadium: Estadio Rodrigo Paz Delgado; Attendance: 7,947; Referee: Franklin Congo

==== Second stage ====
Pos	Team	Pld	W	D	L	GF	GA	GD	Pts	Qualification
1	Emelec	22	12	5	5	35	17	+18	41	Qualification to Third stage and Copa Libertadores group stage
2	Macará	22	10	8	4	31	24	+7	38	
3	LDU Quito	22	9	10	3	32	19	+13	37	
4	Delfín	22	9	9	4	34	22	+12	36	
5	Barcelona	22	9	8	5	28	21	+7	35	

Source: FEF, Soccerway
Rules for classification: 1) Points, 2) Goal difference, 3) Goals for, 4) Away goals for, 5) Goals against, 6) Head-to-head record, 7) Penalty shootout.
If a penalty shootout is not possible: 7) Drawing of lots or playoff game.

Results summary

Overall								Home						Away					
Pld	W	D	L	GF	GA	GD	Pts	W	D	L	GF	GA	GD	W	D	L	GF	GA	GD
22	9	10	3	32	19	+13	37	6	5	0	15	4	+11	3	5	3	17	15	+2

Results by round

Round	1	2	3	4	5	6	7	8	9	10	11	12	13	14	15	16	17	18	19	20	21	22
Ground	A	H	A	H	H	A	H	A	H	A	H	A	H	A	H	A	H	A	A	H	A	H
Result	L	W	D	D	D	W	W	D	W	L	D	D	D	W	W	D	W	L	W	W	D	D
Position	11	7	7	7	7	5	5	4	2	4	4	5	5	3	1	4	3	3	2	2	2	3

Updated to match(es) played on December 8, 2018. Source: Competitive matches
A = Away; H = Home; W = Win; D = Draw; L = Loss

July 21 Round 1	Delfín	2–0	L.D.U. Quito	Manta
15:30 UTC−05:00	Riveros 55'; Garcés 76' (pen.)	Report		Stadium: Estadio Jocay; Attendance: 175; Referee: Vinicio Espinel

July 29 Round 2	L.D.U. Quito	2–1	Emelec	Quito
16:00 UTC−05:00	Quintero (yellow card) 16'; J. Julio (yellow card) 66'; Borja 70'; Anangonó 90+3'	Report	Johnson (yellow card) 51'; Rojas 53', (yellow card) 54' (yellow-red card) 63'; Quintero (yellow card) 55'	Stadium: Estadio Rodrigo Paz Delgado; Attendance: 9,595; Referee: Omar Ponce

August 4 Round 3	El Nacional	2–2	L.D.U. Quito	Quito
15:30 UTC−05:00	Gracia (yellow card) 39'; Ordóñez 62' (pen.); Segovia (yellow card) 64'; Parrales 90', (yellow card) 90'	Report	Anangonó 47'; Salaberry (yellow card) 67'; Guerrero 73'; Rodríguez (yellow card) 75'	Stadium: Estadio Olímpico Atahualpa; Attendance: 7,981; Referee: Roberto Sánchez

August 13 Round 4	L.D.U. Quito	1–1	Aucas	Quito
19:15 UTC−05:00	Quintero 26', (yellow card) 60'; Guerrero (yellow card) 35'; Rodríguez (yellow card) 73'; Nazareno (red card) 90+5'	Report	H. Quiñónez 4'; Hidalgo (yellow card) 15' (yellow-red card) 45'; J. Quiñónez (yellow card) 29'; León (yellow card) 46'; Romero (yellow card) 68'	Stadium: Estadio Rodrigo Paz Delgado; Attendance: 11,807; Referee: José Luis Espinel

August 18 Round 5	L.D.U. Quito	1–1	Técnico Universitario	Quito
15:30 UTC−05:00	Quintero (yellow card) 18'; Anangonó 42'	Report	Patiño (yellow card) 20'; Jauch 35'; Chavasco (yellow card) 54'; Marret (yellow card) 62'	Stadium: Estadio Rodrigo Paz Delgado; Attendance: 6,415; Referee: Juan Carlos Albarracín

August 25 Round 6	Guayaquil City	1–4	L.D.U. Quito	Guayaquil
16:00 UTC−05:00	Frascarelli (yellow card) 16'; Caicedo (yellow card) 62'; Bustamante (yellow card) 76'; Perlaza 86'	Report	J. Julio 16'; A. Julio 38', 56'; Guerrero (yellow card) 45'; Pellerano 69'	Stadium: Estadio Christian Benítez Betancourt; Attendance: 1,139; Referee: Luis Quiroz

August 29 Round 7	L.D.U. Quito	1–0	Independiente del Valle	Quito
16:30 UTC−05:00	J. Julio (yellow card) 55'; Anangonó 75'	Report	Mera (yellow card) 38'; Pellerano (yellow card) 45+1'; León (yellow card) 58'; Preciado (yellow card) 87'	Stadium: Estadio Rodrigo Paz Delgado; Attendance: 8,203; Referee: Guillermo Guerrero

September 2 Round 8	Deportivo Cuenca	2–2	L.D.U. Quito	Cuenca
12:00 UTC−05:00	Carabalí 51'; Rodríguez (yellow card) 57'; Pita (yellow card) 65'; Bonfigli 89'; Bedoya (yellow card) 90+1'	Report	Vega (yellow card) 11'; J. Julio 26'; Anangonó 28'; Intriago (yellow card) 52'; Realpe (yellow card) 64' (yellow-red card) 66'	Stadium: Estadio Alejandro Serrano Aguilar; Attendance: 6,878; Referee: Roddy Zambrano

September 15 Round 10	Macará	3–2	L.D.U. Quito	Ambato
15:00 UTC−05:00	Quiñónez 6', (yellow card) 59'; Corozo 45+1'; De Jesús (yellow card) 54'; Tévez (yellow card) 65', (goal) 83'; Cazares (red card) 90+4'	Report	Anangonó 16'; J. Julio (yellow card) 33'; A. Julio 56'; Guerra (yellow card) 73'; Pellerano (yellow card) 74'; Rodríguez (red card) 90+4'	Stadium: Estadio Bellavista; Attendance: 8,923; Referee: Luis Quiroz

September 23 Round 11	L.D.U. Quito	0–0	Barcelona SC	Quito
12:00 UTC−05:00		Report	Torres (yellow card) 15'; Esterilla (yellow card) 43'; Caicedo (yellow card) 90+3'	Stadium: Estadio Rodrigo Paz Delgado; Attendance: 14,174; Referee: Carlos Orbe

September 30 Round 12	Barcelona SC	1–1	L.D.U. Quito	Guayaquil
16:30 UTC−05:00	Arroyo 16', (yellow card) 38'; Alemán (yellow card) 55'; Mendoza (red card) 56'; Pineida (yellow card) 63'; Esterilla (yellow card) 77'; Nahuelpan (yellow card) 90+4'	Report	J. Julio (yellow card) 37'; Anangonó (yellow card) 38', (goal) 69'; Cruz (yellow card) 43'; Quintero (yellow card) 86'	Stadium: Estadio Monumental Banco Pichincha; Attendance: 20,463; Referee: Vinicio Espinel

October 3 Round 9 (Postponed)	L.D.U. Quito	1–0	Universidad Católica	Quito
19:15 UTC−05:00	Vega (yellow card) 45+5'; Rodríguez 74'; Angulo (yellow card) 90+4'	Report	Galíndez (red card) 28'; Martínez (yellow card) 68'; Cifuente (yellow card) 88'	Stadium: Estadio Rodrigo Paz Delgado; Attendance: 2,541; Referee: Diego Lara

October 7 Round 13	L.D.U. Quito	0–0	Macará	Quito
16:30 UTC−05:00	Quintero (yellow card) 25'; Cruz (yellow card) 82'; Guerrero (yellow card) 90+2'	Report	Arboleda (yellow card) 21'; Lucas (yellow card) 73'	Stadium: Estadio Rodrigo Paz Delgado; Attendance: 15,045; Referee: Omar Ponce

October 13 Round 14	Universidad Católica	0–1	L.D.U. Quito	Quito
18:30 UTC−05:00	Chalá (yellow card) 43'; Godoy (yellow card) 59'; Cifuente (yellow card) 73'	Report	Cruz (yellow card) 30'; Realpe (yellow card) 53'; Anangonó 85'	Stadium: Estadio Olímpico Atahualpa; Attendance: 3,978; Referee: Guillermo Guerrero

October 20 Round 15	L.D.U. Quito	1–0	Deportivo Cuenca	Quito
18:10 UTC−05:00	Pellerano (yellow card) 45'; Anangonó (yellow card) 45+2'; A. Julio (yellow card) 79'; Intriago 84'; Rodríguez (yellow card) 85'	Report	Larrea (yellow card) 36'; Cangá (yellow card) 47' (yellow-red card) 90+2'; Bagüí (yellow card) 69'	Stadium: Estadio Rodrigo Paz Delgado; Attendance: 6,955; Referee: Roberto Sánchez

October 28 Round 16	Independiente del Valle	1–1	L.D.U. Quito	Quito
15:00 UTC−05:00	Preciado (yellow card) 12'; Pellerano (yellow card) 28'; Franco (yellow card) 32', (goal) 69'; Méndez (yellow card) 40'	Report	Pellerano (yellow card) 28'; Quintero (yellow card) 73'; A. Julio 79'	Stadium: Estadio Olímpico Atahualpa; Attendance: 5,061; Referee: Diego Lara

November 5 Round 17	L.D.U. Quito	4–1	Guayaquil City	Quito
19:15 UTC−05:00	Anangonó 31', 53', 61'; Martínez 78'; Cruz (yellow card) 89'	Report	Humanante (yellow card) 84'; Perlaza 90+1'	Stadium: Estadio Rodrigo Paz Delgado; Attendance: 4,428; Referee: Luis Quiroz

November 10 Round 18	Técnico Universitario	2–1	L.D.U. Quito	Ambato
17:15 UTC−05:00	Marret (yellow card) 40'; Mina (yellow card) 46'; Valencia 86'; Patiño (yellow card) 89'; Prieto 90+1'; Pinos (yellow card) 90+8'	Report	Vega (red card) 29'; Quintero 45+2', (yellow card) 49'; Gabbarini (yellow card) 76'; Rodríguez (yellow card) 90+8'	Stadium: Estadio Bellavista; Attendance: 5,532; Referee: Guillermo Guerrero

November 24 Round 20	L.D.U. Quito	4–0	El Nacional	Quito
12:00 UTC−05:00	J. Julio 6'; Intriago (yellow card) 27', (goal) 60' (pen.); A. Julio (yellow card) 36'; Guerrero 56', (red card) 89'; Gabbarini (yellow card) 88'; Anangonó 89'	Report	Garcés (yellow card) 10'; Carabalí (yellow card) 18'; Angulo (yellow card) 25'; Quiñónez (yellow card) 61'; Montaño (red card) 89'	Stadium: Estadio Rodrigo Paz Delgado; Attendance: 9,138; Referee: Roddy Zambrano

November 28 Round 19 (Postponed)	Aucas	1–3	L.D.U. Quito	Quito
16:15 UTC−05:00	Romero (yellow card) 40'; Quiñónez (yellow card) 56'; Vivar 83'	Report	Intriago 8' (pen.); Pellerano (yellow card) 61' (yellow-red card) 72'; Rodríguez (yellow card) 69'; A. Julio 70', 76', (yellow card) 86'; Orejuela (yellow card) 78'	Stadium: Estadio Gonzalo Pozo Ripalda; Attendance: 1,882; Referee: Vinicio Espinel

December 2 Round 21	Emelec	0–0	L.D.U. Quito	Guayaquil
12:00 UTC−05:00	Mejía (yellow card) 62'; Johnson (yellow card) 81'	Report	Intriago (yellow card) 86'; Quintero (yellow card) 81'	Stadium: Estadio George Capwell; Attendance: 31,376; Referee: Luis Quiroz

December 8 Round 22	L.D.U. Quito	0–0	Delfín	Quito
12:00 UTC−05:00	Quintero (yellow card) 23'; Guerra (yellow card) 55'	Report	Cangá (yellow card) 45+1'; Piñatares (yellow card) 73'	Stadium: Estadio Rodrigo Paz Delgado; Attendance: 22,502; Referee: Omar Ponce

==== Finals ====
Standings
Pos	Team	Pld	W	D	L	GF	GA	GD	Pts	Result
1	L.D.U. Quito	2	1	1	0	2	1	+1	4	Champions (11th title)
2	Emelec	2	0	1	1	1	2	−1	1	

Results summary

Overall								Home						Away					
Pld	W	D	L	GF	GA	GD	Pts	W	D	L	GF	GA	GD	W	D	L	GF	GA	GD
2	1	1	0	2	1	+1	4	1	0	0	1	0	+1	0	1	0	1	1	0

Results by round

Round	1	2
Ground	A	H
Result	D	W

Updated to match(es) played on December 16, 2018. Source: Competitive matches
A = Away; H = Home; W = Win; D = Draw; L = Loss

December 12 Finals	Emelec	1–1	L.D.U. Quito	Guayaquil
20:00 UTC−05:00	Mejía (yellow card) 44'; Angulo 45', (yellow card) 78'; Rojas (yellow card) 45'; Arroyo (yellow card) 76'	Report	Guerrero (yellow card) 45'; A. Julio 59'; Quintero (yellow card) 87'; Realpe (yellow card) 87'; Intriago (yellow card) 90+3'	Stadium: Estadio George Capwell; Referee: Carlos Orbe

December 16 Finals	L.D.U. Quito	1–0	Emelec	Quito
12:00 UTC−05:00	A. Julio 10'; Intriago (yellow card) 77'; Gabbarini (yellow card) 89'	Report	Arroyo (yellow card) 35'; Caicedo (yellow card) 45'; Quiñónez (yellow card) 64'; Mejía (yellow card) 77' (yellow-red card) 90+2'	Stadium: Estadio Rodrigo Paz Delgado; Attendance: 35,804; Referee: Luis Quiroz

=== CONMEBOL Sudamericana ===
L.D.U. Quito qualified to the 2018 CONMEBOL Sudamericana—their 11th participation in the continental tournament—as the 8th place of the 2017 Serie A. They entered the competition in the first stage.

==== CONMEBOL Sudamericana squad ====
No.	Pos.	Nation	Player
1	GK	ECU	Leonel Nazareno
2	DF	ARG	Hernán Pellerano
4	DF	ECU	Horacio Salaberry
5	MF	ECU	Jefferson Intriago
6	DF	ECU	Aníbal Chalá
7	MF	ECU	Édison Vega (captain)
8	FW	ECU	Djorkaeff Reasco
9	FW	URU	Gastón Rodríguez
10	MF	ECU	Jonathan Borja
11	MF	ECU	Anderson Julio
12	GK	ECU	Erik Viveros
13	MF	ECU	Jordy Alcívar
14	DF	ECU	José Quintero
15	DF	ECU	Franklin Guerra

No.	Pos.	Nation	Player
16	MF	ECU	Julio Angulo
17	FW	ECU	Juan Luis Anangonó
18	MF	ECU	Jefferson Orejuela
20	DF	ECU	Christian Cruz
21	DF	ECU	Andersson Ordóñez
22	GK	ARG	Adrián Gabbarini
23	MF	ECU	Fernando Guerrero
24	DF	ECU	Kevin Minda
25	DF	ECU	Édison Realpe
26	MF	ECU	Jhojan Julio
27	MF	ECU	Édgar Villena
28	MF	ECU	William Ocles
29	DF	ECU	Gregori Anangonó
30	DF	ECU	Renny Folleco

Overall								Home						Away					
Pld	W	D	L	GF	GA	GD	Pts	W	D	L	GF	GA	GD	W	D	L	GF	GA	GD
6	3	0	3	8	7	+1	9	3	0	0	6	2	+4	0	0	3	2	5	−3

==== First stage ====
April 10 First Stage	L.D.U. Quito (Ecuador)	2–1	(Bolivia) Guabirá	Quito, Ecuador
17:15 UTC−05:00	Rodríguez 27'; Barcos 41'	Report	Ribera (yellow card) 10'; Pizarro 59'; Chávez (yellow card) 75'; Amarilla (yellow card) 84'; Áñez (yellow card) 89'	Stadium: Estadio Rodrigo Paz Delgado; Attendance: 15,366; Referee: Piero Maza (Chile)

May 8 First Stage	Guabirá (Bolivia)	3–2	(Ecuador) L.D.U. Quito	Montero, Bolivia
18:15 UTC−04:00	Aguirre (yellow card) 2'; Michelli (yellow card) 18'; Castillo 27'; Hoyos 70'; Montenegro 76', (yellow card) 77'	Report	Anangonó 58'; Guerra (yellow card) 63'; A. Julio (yellow card) 66'; Quintero (yellow card) 75'; Barcos 82'; Guerrero (yellow card) 85'	Stadium: Estadio Gilberto Parada; Referee: Leodán González (Uruguay)

Tied 4–4 on aggregate, LDU Quito won on away goals and advanced to the second stage.

==== Second stage ====
July 25 Second Stage	L.D.U. Quito (Ecuador)	3–1	(Brazil) Vasco da Gama	Quito, Ecuador
17:30 UTC−05:00	Anangonó 8', 87'; J. Julio 20', (yellow card) 78'; Guerrero (yellow card) 34'	Report	Ricardo Graça (yellow card) 5'; Thiago Galhardo 54' (pen.); Silva (yellow card) 76'	Stadium: Estadio Rodrigo Paz Delgado; Attendance: 8,286; Referee: Juan Soto (Venezuela)

August 9 Second Stage	Vasco da Gama (Brazil)	1–0	(Ecuador) L.D.U. Quito	Rio de Janeiro, Brazil
19:30 UTC−03:00	Breno (yellow card) 8'; Yago Pikachu (yellow card) 18'; Luiz Gustavo (yellow card) 18'; Thiago Galhardo 86'	Report	Gabbarini (yellow card) 37'; Guerrero (yellow card) 50'; Intriago (yellow card) 74'; Orejuela (yellow card) 88'	Stadium: Estádio São Januário; Attendance: 18,943; Referee: Mario Díaz de Vivar (Paraguay)

LDU Quito won 3–2 on aggregate and advanced to the round of 16 (Match H).

==== Round of 16 ====
August 22 Round of 16	L.D.U. Quito (Ecuador)	1–0	(Colombia) Deportivo Cali	Quito, Ecuador
19:45 UTC−05:00	A. Julio 24'	Report	Cabrera (yellow card) 37'; Benedetti (yellow card) 48'	Stadium: Estadio Rodrigo Paz Delgado; Attendance: 16,409; Referee: Esteban Ostojich (Uruguay)

September 19 Round of 16	Deportivo Cali (Colombia)	1–0 (3–1 p)	(Ecuador) L.D.U. Quito	Palmira, Colombia
19:45 UTC−05:00	Cabrera (yellow card) 9'; Giraldo (yellow card) 29'; Rosero (yellow card) 40' (yellow-red card) 60'; Sand 44'; Pérez (yellow card) 75'	Report	Vega (yellow card) 20'; Realpe (yellow card) 89'	Stadium: Estadio Deportivo Cali; Referee: Diego Haro (Peru)
	Penalties
	Pérez (penalty scored); Torres (penalty scored); Giraldo (penalty missed); Caicedo (penalty missed); Sand (penalty scored)		(penalty missed) Guerrero; (penalty missed) Rodríguez; (penalty missed) Orejuela; (penalty scored) Cruz

Tied 1–1 on aggregate, Deportivo Cali won on penalties and advanced to the quarterfinals.

== Player statistics ==
Num	Pos	Player	App	Goal	Yellow card	Red card	App	Goal	Yellow card	Red card	App	Goal	Yellow card	Red card
Num	Pos	Player	Serie A				Copa Sudamericana				Total			
1	GK	Leonel Nazareno	3	—	—	1	—	—	—	—	3	—	—	1
2	DF	Hernán Pellerano	22	1	3	1	3	—	—	—	25	1	3	1
4	DF	Horacio Salaberry	11	—	2	—	2	—	—	—	13	—	2	—
5	MF	Jefferson Intriago	39	3	8	1	4	—	1	—	43	3	9	1
6	DF	Aníbal Chalá	13	—	—	—	3	—	—	—	16	—	—	—
7	MF	Édison Vega	32	—	5	1	4	—	1	—	36	—	6	1
8	FW	Djorkaeff Reasco	5	—	—	—	—	—	—	—	5	—	—	—
9	FW	Gastón Rodríguez	38	6	10	1	6	1	—	—	44	7	10	1
10	MF	Jonathan Borja	25	1	—	—	5	—	—	—	30	1	—	—
11	MF	Anderson Julio	45	12	7	1	6	1	1	—	51	13	8	1
12	GK	Erik Viveros	1	—	—	—	—	—	—	—	1	—	—	—
13	MF	Jordy Alcívar	2	—	—	—	—	—	—	—	2	—	—	—
14	DF	José Quintero	39	3	19	—	5	—	1	—	44	3	20	—
15	DF	Franklin Guerra	44	1	4	—	6	—	1	—	50	1	5	—
16	MF	Julio Angulo	13	—	1	—	2	—	—	—	15	—	1	—
17	FW	Juan Luis Anangonó	35	16	3	—	5	3	—	—	40	19	3	—
18	MF	Jefferson Orejuela	38	—	5	—	6	—	1	—	44	—	6	—
19	FW	Cristian Martínez	15	1	—	—	—	—	—	—	15	1	—	—
20	DF	Christian Cruz	38	—	8	—	3	—	—	—	41	—	8	—
21	DF	Andersson Ordóñez	18	—	7	1	2	—	—	—	20	—	7	1
22	GK	Adrián Gabbarini	42	—	5	—	6	—	1	—	48	—	6	—
23	MF	Fernando Guerrero	39	4	8	1	5	—	3	—	44	4	11	1
24	DF	Kevin Minda	5	—	—	—	—	—	—	—	5	—	—	—
25	DF	Édison Realpe	15	—	5	1	1	—	1	—	16	—	6	1
26	MF	Jhojan Julio	44	6	8	—	6	1	1	—	50	7	9	—
27	MF	Édgar Villena	—	—	—	—	—	—	—	—	—	—	—	—
28	MF	William Ocles	2	—	—	—	—	—	—	—	2	—	—	—
29	DF	Gregori Anangonó	—	—	—	—	—	—	—	—	—	—	—	—
30	DF	Renny Folleco	—	—	—	—	—	—	—	—	—	—	—	—
16	FW	Hernán Barcos	20	9	5	—	2	2	—	—	22	11	5	—
Totals			—	63	113	9	—	8	12	0	—	71	125	9

As of December 16, 2018

Note: Players in italics left the club mid-season.

== Team statistics ==
	Total	Home	Away
Total Games played	52	26	26
Total Games won	27	18	9
Total Games drawn	15	7	8
Total Games lost	10	1	9
Games played (Serie A)	46	23	23
Games won (Serie A)	24	15	9
Games drawn (Serie A)	15	7	8
Games lost (Serie A)	7	1	6
Games played (CONMEBOL Sudamericana)	6	3	3
Games won (CONMEBOL Sudamericana)	3	3	
Games drawn (CONMEBOL Sudamericana)			
Games lost (CONMEBOL Sudamericana)	3		3
Biggest win (Serie A)	4–0 vs Técnico Universitario; 4–0 vs El Nacional	4–0 vs Técnico Universitario; 4–0 vs El Nacional	4–1 vs Guayaquil City
Biggest loss (Serie A)	0–2 vs Deportivo Cuenca; 0–2 vs Delfín	0–2 vs Deportivo Cuenca	0–2 vs Delfín
Biggest win (CONMEBOL Sudamericana)	3–1 vs Vasco da Gama	3–1 vs Vasco da Gama	
Biggest loss (CONMEBOL Sudamericana)	2–3 vs Guabirá; 0–1 vs Vasco da Gama; 0–1 vs Deportivo Cali		2–3 vs Guabirá; 0–1 vs Vasco da Gama; 0–1 vs Deportivo Cali
Clean sheets	20	12	8
Goals scored	74	42	32
Goals conceded	45	15	30
Goal difference	+29	+27	+2
Average GF per game	1.42	1.62	1.23
Average GA per game	0.87	0.58	1.15
Yellow cards	125	52	73
Red cards	9	2	7
Most appearances	(Ecuador) Anderson Julio (51)	(Ecuador) Franklin Guerra (25) (Ecuador) Anderson Julio (25)	(Ecuador) Anderson Julio (26) (Ecuador) Jhojan Julio (26)
Most minutes played	(Argentina) Adrián Gabbarini (4320)	(Ecuador) Franklin Guerra (2186)	(Argentina) Adrián Gabbarini (2250)
Top scorer	(Ecuador) Juan Luis Anangonó (19)	(Ecuador) Juan Luis Anangonó (11)	(Ecuador) Anderson Julio (10)
Worst discipline	(Ecuador) Fernando Guerrero (1) (red card) (11) (yellow card)	(Ecuador) Fernando Guerrero (1) (red card) (4) (yellow card)	(Ecuador) Jefferson Intriago (1) (red card) (6) (yellow card) (Uruguay) Gastón Rodríguez (1) (red card) (6) (yellow card)
Penalties for	5/6 (83.33%)	3/4 (75%)	2/2 (100%)
Penalties against	6/11 (54.55%)	3/6 (50%)	3/5 (60%)
League Points	87/138 (63.04%)	52/69 (75.36%)	35/69 (50.72%)
Winning rate	51.92%	69.23%	34.62%

As of December 16, 2018
Source: See Competitive matches (above)
