= 2018 Barcelona Sporting Club season =

Ecuadorian football club season

Barcelona SC
2018 season
- President: José Francisco Cevallos
- Manager: Guillermo Almada
- Stadium: Monumental Banco Pichincha
- Serie A: 3rd
- C. Sudamericana: First stage
- Top goalscorer: League: Juan Ignacio Dinenno (16); All: Juan Ignacio Dinenno (17)
- Highest home attendance: 51.937 v. Emelec
- Lowest home attendance: 3.195 v. Guayaquil City
- Biggest win: Barcelona 5–1 El Nacional
- Biggest defeat: Emelec 2–0 Barcelona Barcelona 0–2 Emelec
Home colours	Away colours	Third colours

The 2018 season was Barcelona Sporting Club's 93rd in existence and the club's 60th consecutive season in the top flight of Ecuadorian football.

== Competitions ==
=== Overview ===
Competition	First match	Last match	Starting round	Final position	Record							
Competition	First match	Last match	Starting round	Final position	Pld	W	D	L	GF	GA	GD	Win %
LigaPro	16 February 2018	8 December 2018	First stage - Matchday 1	3rd place	44	22	14	8	69	42	+27	50.00
Copa Sudamericana	20 February 2018	7 March 2018	First stage	First stage	2	0	1	1	1	2	−1	0.00
Total					46	22	15	9	70	44	+26	47.83

Last updated: 8 December 2018
Source: Soccerway

=== Serie A ===
==== First stage ====
===== Standings =====
Pos	Team	Pld	W	D	L	GF	GA	GD	Pts	Qualification
1	LDU Quito	22	14	4	4	32	18	+14	46	Qualification to Third stage and Copa Libertadores group stage
2	Barcelona	22	13	6	3	41	21	+20	45	
3	Universidad Católica	22	11	5	6	40	28	+12	38	
4	Emelec	22	11	4	7	34	27	+7	37	
5	Delfín	22	10	3	9	35	34	+1	33	
6	Independiente del Valle	22	9	4	9	30	27	+3	31	

Source: FEF, Soccerway
Rules for classification: 1) Points, 2) Goal difference, 3) Goals for, 4) Away goals for, 5) Goals against, 6) Head-to-head record, 7) Penalty shootout.
If a penalty shootout is not possible: 7) Drawing of lots or playoff game.

===== Matches =====
16 February 2018 1	Barcelona	3-2	Universidad Católica	Guayaquil
19:30 ECT	Nahuelpán 16' (pen.); Esterilla 74'; Dinenno 89'	Report	Cifuente 34', 70'	Stadium: Monumental Banco Pichincha; Attendance: 18.687; Referee: Jefferson Macías

25 February 2018 2	Técnico Universitario	0–1	Barcelona	Ambato
12:00 ECT			Caicedo 22'	Stadium: Bellavista; Referee: Omar Ponce

2 March 2018 3	Barcelona	0–0	Independiente del Valle	Guayaquil
19:30 ECT				Stadium: Monumental Banco Pichincha; Attendance: 23.182; Referee: Carlos Orbe

11 March 2018 4	Delfín	0–1	Barcelona	Manta
19:30 ECT			Díaz 66'	Stadium: Jocay

18 March 2018 5	Barcelona	5–1	El Nacional	Guayaquil
17:00 ECT	M. Caicedo 1'; Esterilla 4'; Dinenno 38'; Díaz 79'; Nahuelpan 82'		Parrales 50'	Stadium: Monumental Banco Pichincha; Referee: Vinicio Espinel

25 March 2018 6	Aucas	1–1	Barcelona	Quito
12:00 ECT				Stadium: Gonzalo Pozo Ripalda; Referee: Daniel Salazar

==== Aggregate table ====
Pos	Team	Pld	W	D	L	GF	GA	GD	Pts	Qualification
1	LDU Quito (C)	44	23	14	7	64	37	+27	83	Qualification to Copa Libertadores group stage
2	Barcelona	44	22	14	8	69	42	+27	80	Qualification to Copa Libertadores second stage
3	Emelec	44	23	9	12	69	44	+25	78	Qualification to Copa Libertadores group stage
4	Delfín	44	19	12	13	69	56	+13	69	Qualification to Copa Libertadores first stage
5	Universidad Católica	44	19	8	17	69	60	+9	65	Qualification to Copa Sudamericana first stage
6	Macará	44	17	14	13	56	53	+3	65	Qualification to Copa Sudamericana first stage
7	Independiente del Valle	44	18	10	16	61	51	+10	64	Qualification to Copa Sudamericana first stage

Source: FEF
Rules for classification: 1) Points, 2) Goal difference, 3) Goals for, 4) Away goals for, 5) Goals against, 6) Head-to-head record, 7) Penalty shootout.
If a penalty shootout is not possible: 7) Drawing of lots or playoff game.
(C) Champions

=== Copa Sudamericana ===
==== First stage ====
20 February 2018 First leg	Barcelona (Ecuador)	0–0	(Paraguay) General Díaz	Guayaquil, Ecuador
19:30 UTC−5		Report		Stadium: Estadio Monumental Banco Pichincha, Guayaquil; Referee: Michael Espinoza (Peru)

7 March 2018 Second leg	General Díaz (Paraguay)	2–1 (2–1 agg.)	(Ecuador) Barcelona	Luque, Paraguay
19:15 UTC−3	Espinoza 48'; Leichtweis 71' (pen.)	Report	Dinenno 60'	Stadium: Estadio Feliciano Cáceres, Luque (Note: General Díaz played their home match at Estadio Feliciano Cáceres, Luque, instead of their regular stadium Estadio General Adrián Jara, Luque.); Referee: Patricio Loustau (Argentina)

- General Díaz won 2–1 on aggregate and advanced to the second stage.
