= Fernando Guerrero (Ecuadorian footballer) =

Ecuadorian footballer (born 1989)

Personal information
- Full name: Fernando Alexander Guerrero Vásquez
- Date of birth: 30 September 1989 (age 37)
- Place of birth: Quito, Ecuador
- Height: 1.71 m (5 ft 7 in)
- Position: Left winger

Team information
- Current team: Cienciano
- Number: 23

Youth career
- Real Madrid

Senior career*
| Years | Team | Apps | (Gls) |
| 2007–2009 | Real Madrid B | | |
| 2008 | → L.D.U. Loja (loan) | 4 | (0) |
| 2008 | → Emelec (loan) | 5 | (1) |
| 2009–2014 | Independiente del Valle | 196 | (40) |
| 2009–2010 | → Burnley (loan) | 7 | (0) |
| 2011–2012 | → Villarreal B (loan) | 7 | (0) |
| 2015–2016 | Leones Negros | 39 | (3) |
| 2016–2017 | → L.D.U. Quito (loan) | 35 | (1) |
| 2017 | → Chapecoense (loan) | 2 | (0) |
| 2018 | → L.D.U. Quito (loan) | 39 | (4) |
| 2019–2020 | CS Emelec | 22 | (1) |
| 2020–2021 | Independiente del Valle | 20 | (1) |
| 2022– | Cienciano del Cusco | 29 | (4) |

International career^{‡}
| 2007– | Ecuador | 5 | (0) |
- * Club domestic league appearances and goals as of 19:51, 23 July 2020 (UTC) ‡ National team caps and goals as of 11 September 2018

Fernando Alexander Guerrero Vásquez (born 30 September 1989) is an Ecuadorian footballer who plays for Cienciano del Cusco.

== Club career ==
Considered by many to be one of the future forwards of the Ecuador national team, he emigrated to Spain as a child and began working his ranks up Real Madrid's youth system. His father, ex-footballer Jose Fernando Guerrero, used to play for El Nacional. On 10 December 2007, it was announced that Real Madrid had reached an agreement with Emelec on a loan deal.

=== Burnley FC ===
==== 2009–10 season ====
On Wednesday 15 July 2009, it was confirmed that Guerrero was to join Burnley on trial after impressing manager Owen Coyle whilst playing for Castilla. He will link up with them as they prepare to fly out to the US as part of their pre-season training. On 16 July 2009, the day Burnley were set to fly out to America, Coyle publicly said that he would be willing to pay up to £2,000,000 to get his man if he impresses during the trial. In his first trial game for Burnley, Guerrero scored and won a penalty for the side. Burnley's manager Owen Coyle and winger Chris Eagles praised him for his determination, speed and game style. Coyle also hinted to Sky Sports that was set to offer Guerrero a deal with the club after the game against Portland Timbers was the last game of the United States tour. On 6 August 2009 it was announced that Guerrero would spend the 2009/10 season with Burnley on loan. Burnley will also have the opportunity to purchase Guerrero if he is successful at the club for a reported fee of 2 million euros. He made his league debut in Burnley's Premiership opener against Stoke City.

=== Independiente del Valle ===
==== 2010–2011 seasons ====
On 5 March 2010, Guerrero returned to his parent club Independiente del Valle after his departure from Burnley. In June 2011, he travelled to Mexico for spend a test in Puebla, the one that he did not pass. Fernando was loaned to Villarreal B, having scored 13 goals in 59 league matches with Independiente del Valle.

==== 2012–2013 seasons ====
On 2012 Guerrero returned from his loan from Spain. His first league goal for the 2012 season was on 14 April, in a 2–0 away win against Tecnico Universitario. Later throughout the month of November 2012, Guerrero scored 3 goals in 3 separate matches against Macara, Emelec and Deportivo Cuenca. He scored 4 goals in 33 matches, which helped Independiente del Valle reach for the first time ever a spot in international football, a first round berth for the 2013 Copa Sudamericana.

2013 Would prove to be his break-through season, scoring his first goals of the 2013 season on 16 February in an emphatic 5–2 away win against Ecuadorian giants Barcelona SC. A week later he scored against Macara in a 3–0 home win. On 9 March he scored his fourth against Deportivo Cuenca in a 2–1 home win. On June Guerrero scored his fifth and sixth goals of the season against Barcelona SC and Manta. On 28 July he scored his eighth, against Macara. A week later against Universidad Catolica he scored in a 3–2 home win. On 9 August Guerrero scored a double to give Independiente del Valle their first historic international victory, winning 2–0 away against Deportivo Anzoátegui.

=== CS Emelec ===
On 2 January 2019, Guerrero joined C.S. Emelec.

== International career ==
Guerrero has played with the Ecuador national team at U-20 level. He increased his talent and technique greatly during the South American Youth Football Championship while playing for his country. Days later, he received his first call up with the national team on 21 January 2007 in a friendly against Sweden. This was where he received his first cap for the national team.

== Honours ==
LDU Quito

- Ecuadorian Serie A: 2018

Independiente del Valle

- Ecuadorian Serie A: 2021
