= Diego Scotti =

Uruguayan footballer (born 1977)

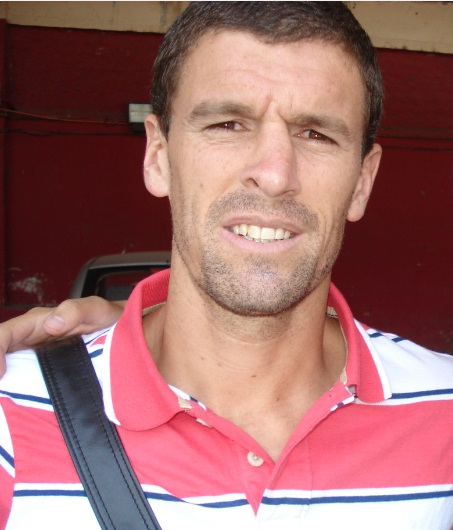

Personal information
- Full name: Diego Martín Scotti Ponce De León
- Date of birth: 14 January 1977 (age 49)
- Place of birth: Montevideo, Uruguay
- Height: 1.81 m (5 ft 11 in)
- Position: Defensive midfielder

Senior career*
Years	Team	Apps	(Gls)
1998–2000	Nacional	28	(5)
2001–2002	Gimnasia La Plata	43	(1)
2002	Tianjin Teda	9	(0)
2003	Nacional	16	(0)
2004–2005	Gimnasia La Plata	29	(1)
2005–2006	Olimpia	30	(0)
2006	Montevideo Wanderers	15	(0)
2007	Audax Italiano	54	(3)
2008–2009	Newell's Old Boys	14	(0)
2009	Racing de Montevideo	15	(0)
2010	Córdoba	19	(0)
2010	Miramar Misiones	12	(4)
2011–2015	Unión Española	127	(11)
2015–2016	Montevideo Wanderers	27	(3)
2017–2019	Boston River	90	(2)
- * Club domestic league appearances and goals

Diego Martín Scotti Ponce de León (born 14 January 1977 in Montevideo) is an Uruguayan retired footballer.

Scotti has had an extensive career in South America and China he has played for: Nacional, Montevideo Wanderers and Racing de Montevideo in Uruguay, Tianjin Teda F.C. in China, Olimpia in Paraguay, Audax Italiano in Chile.

He has also played in Argentina for Gimnasia y Esgrima de La Plata and Newell's Old Boys. His older brother Andrés Scotti currently plays in Uruguay for Nacional de Montevideo. He primarily played as a defensive midfielder but could also play as a centre back.

== Club career ==
Scotti began his career at Nacional de Montevideo in 1998, winning the league title two years later. In January 2001, he was transferred to Gimnasia La Plata of Argentina. Scotti completed his move to Tianjin Teda for play in the Chinese Super League. After of his pass for China, he returned to Nacional in December 2003, once returning, now to Gimnasia. In 2005, he was transferred to Olimpia, remaining him until 2006, for shortly after signed for Montevideo Wanderers.

=== Audax and Newell's ===
In January 2007, Scotti joined Audax Italiano, signing a one-year contract. His Audax debut came on 28 January against Cobresal, playing the 90 minutes in a 2–1 victory. Scotti's first goals in the team was scored on a twice against Santiago Wanderers. He and his teammates achieved a very good football level under the coach Raul Toro, finishing thirds in positions table. In the next semester, he had many protagonism in the team, playing all matches, scoring goals and exhibiting good skills.

His Audax performances, made that he was signed by Newell's Old Boys in January 2008, returning of this form to Argentina, after of play for Gimnasia y Esgrima de La Plata. However, he only played 14 games and in 2009, he was released of the club. Shortly after, Scotti signed for Racing de Montevideo. In 2010, he joined Córdoba of the Spanish Second Division before shortly after returning to his country to play in Miramar Misiones.

=== Unión Española ===
On 31 January 2010, Scotti's transfer to Unión Española of the Primera División was announced; he signed a one-year contract with the Chilean club for play the Copa Libertadores and the national league. He made his Unión debut as a 71st-minute substitution for Leandro Delgado, in the 1–0 win over Bolívar for the playoffs round of the Libertadores. He had a highlighted participation in the 2–1 loss against Colo-Colo for the national tournament, being one of Unión's best players in the game.

=== Boston River ===
On 5 July 2015, Diego Scotti signed for Montevideo Wanderers, with whom he played for only one year, as he then joined Boston River in 2016, where he stayed until he retired in 2019. On 15 May 2018, he scored a brace to help his team to a 3–0 win over Jaguares de Córdoba in the 2018 Copa Sudamericana first stage, becoming, at the age of 41 years, 3 months, and 27 days, the oldest player to ever score in the Copa Sudamericana, a record that has since been broken by Richard Pellejero, who scored a brace in the 2019 Copa Sudamericana at the age of 43 years and 31 days.

== Honours ==
=== Club ===
Unión Española

- Primera División de Chile (1): 2013 Transición
- Supercopa de Chile (1): 2013
