= 2018 Copa Sudamericana first stage =

1st stage of the 2018 Copa Sudamericana

The 2018 Copa Sudamericana first stage was played from 13 February to 23 May 2018. A total of 44 teams competed in the first stage to decide 22 of the 32 places in the second stage of the 2018 Copa Sudamericana.

== Draw ==
The draw for the first stage was held on 20 December 2017, 20:00 PYST (UTC−3), at the CONMEBOL Convention Centre in Luque, Paraguay. For the first stage, the teams were divided into two pots according to their geographical zones:

- Pot A (South Zone): 22 teams from Argentina, Bolivia, Chile, Paraguay, and Uruguay
- Pot B (North Zone): 22 teams from Brazil, Colombia, Ecuador, Peru, and Venezuela

The 44 teams were drawn into 22 ties (E1–E22) between a team from Pot A and a team from Pot B, with the teams from Pot B hosting the second leg in odd-numbered ties, and the teams from Pot A hosting the second leg in even-numbered ties. This distribution ensured that teams from the same association could not be drawn into the same tie.

First stage draw
Pot A (South Zone)	Pot B (North Zone)
(Argentina) San Lorenzo; (Argentina) Lanús; (Argentina) Newell's Old Boys; (Argentina) Defensa y Justicia; (Argentina) Colón; (Argentina) Rosario Central; (Bolivia) Blooming; (Bolivia) Guabirá; (Bolivia) San José; (Bolivia) Nacional Potosí; (Chile) Unión Española; (Chile) Everton; (Chile) Audax Italiano; (Chile) Deportes Temuco; (Paraguay) Sol de América; (Paraguay) General Díaz; (Paraguay) Sportivo Luqueño; (Paraguay) Nacional; (Uruguay) Cerro; (Uruguay) Boston River; (Uruguay) Rampla Juniors; (Uruguay) Danubio	(Brazil) Atlético Mineiro; (Brazil) Botafogo; (Brazil) Atlético Paranaense; (Brazil) Bahia; (Brazil) São Paulo; (Brazil) Fluminense; (Colombia) Independiente Medellín; (Colombia) América de Cali; (Colombia) Deportivo Cali; (Colombia) Jaguares; (Ecuador) Barcelona; (Ecuador) El Nacional; (Ecuador) Deportivo Cuenca; (Ecuador) LDU Quito; (Peru) UTC; (Peru) Sport Huancayo; (Peru) Sport Rosario; (Peru) Sporting Cristal; (Venezuela) Mineros de Guayana; (Venezuela) Estudiantes de Mérida; (Venezuela) Caracas; (Venezuela) Zamora

Notes

1. ^{†} Drawn as Bolivia 3 (San José) and Bolivia 4 (Nacional Potosí).
2. ^{‡} The identity of the team Chile 1 was not known at the time of the draw.

== Format ==
In the first stage, each tie was played on a home-and-away two-legged basis. If tied on aggregate, the away goals rule would be used. If still tied, extra time would not be played, and the penalty shoot-out would be used to determine the winner (Regulations Article 27).

The 22 winners of the first stage advanced to the second stage to join the 10 teams transferred from the Copa Libertadores (two best teams eliminated in the third stage of qualifying and eight third-placed teams in the group stage).

== Matches ==
The first legs were played on 13, 15, 20–22 February, 10–12 and 18 April, and the second legs were played on 6–8 March, 8–10 and 23 May 2018.

Team 1	Agg.	Team 2	1st leg	2nd leg
Everton (Chile)	2–2 (a)	(Venezuela) Caracas	1–2	1–0
Estudiantes de Mérida (Venezuela)	1–3	(Chile) Deportes Temuco	1–1	0–2
Lanús (Argentina)	5–4	(Peru) Sporting Cristal	4–2	1–2
Deportivo Cali (Colombia)	5–3	(Uruguay) Danubio	3–0	2–3
San Lorenzo (Argentina)	1–0	(Brazil) Atlético Mineiro	1–0	0–0
LDU Quito (Ecuador)	4–4 (a)	(Bolivia) Guabirá	2–1	2–3
Nacional (Paraguay)	0–0 (4–3 p)	(Venezuela) Mineros de Guayana	0–0	0–0
Sport Rosario (Peru)	0–2	(Uruguay) Cerro	0–0	0–2
Sol de América (Paraguay)	3–3 (a)	(Colombia) Independiente Medellín	2–0	1–3
Barcelona (Ecuador)	1–2	(Paraguay) General Díaz	0–0	1–2
Sportivo Luqueño (Paraguay)	2–2 (5–6 p)	(Ecuador) Deportivo Cuenca	2–0	0–2
UTC (Peru)	2–4	(Uruguay) Rampla Juniors	2–0	0–4
Defensa y Justicia (Argentina)	3–1	(Colombia) América de Cali	0–1	3–0
Atlético Paranaense (Brazil)	4–2	(Argentina) Newell's Old Boys	3–0	1–2
Unión Española (Chile)	0–3	(Peru) Sport Huancayo	0–0	0–3
Jaguares (Colombia)	2–4	(Uruguay) Boston River	2–1	0–3
Rosario Central (Argentina)	0–1	(Brazil) São Paulo	0–0	0–1
El Nacional (Ecuador)	4–3	(Bolivia) San José	3–2	1–1
Blooming (Bolivia)	1–4	(Brazil) Bahia	1–0	0–4
Zamora (Venezuela)	0–3	(Argentina) Colón	0–2	0–1
Audax Italiano (Chile)	2–3	(Brazil) Botafogo	1–2	1–1
Fluminense (Brazil)	3–2	(Bolivia) Nacional Potosí	3–0	0–2

=== Match E1 ===
22 February 2018
21:30 UTC−3

Everton (Chile)	1–2	(Venezuela) Caracas
Cuevas 73' (pen.)	Report	Arrieta 75'; Pernía 90'

Estadio Sausalito, Viña del Mar
Attendance: 8,646
Referee: Luis Quiroz (Ecuador)

6 March 2018
20:45 UTC−4

Caracas (Venezuela)	0–1	(Chile) Everton
	Report	Madrid 63'

Estadio Metropolitano de Cabudare, Cabudare (Note: Caracas played their home match at Estadio Metropolitano de Cabudare, Cabudare, instead of their regular stadium Estadio Olímpico de la UCV, Caracas.)
Attendance: 1,500
Referee: Raphael Claus (Brazil)

Tied 2–2 on aggregate, Caracas won on away goals and advanced to the second stage.

=== Match E2 ===
18 April 2018 (Note: The Estudiantes de Mérida v Deportes Temuco match was originally scheduled on 10 April 2018, 20:30 local time, but was re-scheduled to 18 April 2018, 18:15 local time due to the suspension of operations by Copa Airlines in Venezuela.)
18:15 UTC−4

Estudiantes de Mérida (Venezuela)	1–1	(Chile) Deportes Temuco
Herrera 73'	Report	Ábalos 88'

Estadio Metropolitano de Mérida, Mérida
Attendance: 7,000
Referee: Ivo Méndez (Bolivia)

9 May 2018
19:15 UTC−3

Deportes Temuco (Chile)	2–0	(Venezuela) Estudiantes de Mérida
Riquero 5'; Canío 90+2' (pen.)	Report

Estadio Municipal Germán Becker, Temuco
Attendance: 10,075
Referee: Gustavo Murillo (Colombia)

Deportes Temuco won 3–1 on aggregate and advanced to the second stage.

=== Match E3 ===
21 February 2018
19:15 UTC−3

Lanús (Argentina)	4–2	(Peru) Sporting Cristal
Vides 15'; Acosta 28'; Silva 31' (pen.); Di Renzo 85'	Report	Herrera 21', 52' (pen.)

Estadio Ciudad de Lanús, Lanús
Attendance: 10,000
Referee: Gery Vargas (Bolivia)

7 March 2018
19:45 UTC−5

Sporting Cristal (Peru)	2–1	(Argentina) Lanús
Herrera 7' (pen.); Calcaterra 90+2'	Report	García Guerreño 85'

Estadio Nacional, Lima (Note: Sporting Cristal played their home match at Estadio Nacional, Lima, instead of their regular stadium Estadio Alberto Gallardo, Lima.)
Attendance: 25,000
Referee: Anderson Daronco (Brazil)

Lanús won 5–4 on aggregate and advanced to the second stage.

=== Match E4 ===
10 April 2018
19:30 UTC−5

Deportivo Cali (Colombia)	3–0	(Uruguay) Danubio
Sand 14'; Delgado 54'; Benedetti 69'	Report

Estadio Deportivo Cali, Palmira
Attendance: 19,562
Referee: Alexis Herrera (Venezuela)

8 May 2018
21:45 UTC−3

Danubio (Uruguay)	3–2	(Colombia) Deportivo Cali
Sosa 3'; Ceppelini 77'; J. Rodríguez 85'	Report	Benedetti 54'; Delgado 55'

Estadio Luis Franzini, Montevideo (Note: Danubio played their home match at Estadio Luis Franzini, Montevideo, instead of their regular stadium Estadio Jardines del Hipódromo, Montevideo.)
Attendance: 4,000
Referee: Mauro Vigliano (Argentina)

Deportivo Cali won 5–3 on aggregate and advanced to the second stage.

=== Match E5 ===
11 April 2018
19:15 UTC−3

San Lorenzo (Argentina)	1–0	(Brazil) Atlético Mineiro
Gudiño 39'	Report

Estadio Pedro Bidegain, Buenos Aires
Attendance: 20,000
Referee: Leodán González (Uruguay)

8 May 2018
21:45 UTC−3

Atlético Mineiro (Brazil)	0–0	(Argentina) San Lorenzo
	Report

Estádio Independência, Belo Horizonte
Attendance: 13,517
Referee: Julio Bascuñán (Chile)

San Lorenzo won 1–0 on aggregate and advanced to the second stage.

=== Match E6 ===
10 April 2018
17:15 UTC−5

LDU Quito (Ecuador)	2–1	(Bolivia) Guabirá
Rodríguez 26'; Barcos 40'	Report	Pizarro 58'

Estadio Rodrigo Paz Delgado, Quito
Attendance: 6,000
Referee: Piero Maza (Chile)

8 May 2018
18:15 UTC−4

Guabirá (Bolivia)	3–2	(Ecuador) LDU Quito
Castillo 26'; Hoyos 69'; Montenegro 75'	Report	Anangonó 57'; Barcos 81'

Estadio Gilberto Parada, Montero
Attendance: 11,000
Referee: Leodán González (Uruguay)

Tied 4–4 on aggregate, LDU Quito won on away goals and advanced to the second stage.

=== Match E7 ===
15 February 2018
19:15 UTC−3

Nacional (Paraguay)	0–0	(Venezuela) Mineros
	Report

Estadio Defensores del Chaco, Asunción (Note: Nacional played their home match at Estadio Defensores del Chaco, Asunción, instead of their regular stadium Estadio Arsenio Erico, Asunción.)
Attendance: 2,000
Referee: Silvio Trucco (Argentina)

8 March 2018
18:15 UTC−4

Mineros (Venezuela)	0–0	(Paraguay) Nacional
	Report
Penalties
Gómez (penalty scored); Faría (penalty scored); Hurtado (penalty scored); Machado (penalty missed); Ortiz (penalty missed); Pol (penalty missed)	3–4	(penalty scored) Salgueiro; (penalty missed) Dávalos; (penalty missed) Espínola; (penalty scored) Villagra; (penalty scored) Bareiro; (penalty scored) Santana

Estadio Cachamay, Puerto Ordaz
Attendance: 3,000
Referee: Ricardo Marques (Brazil)

Tied 0–0 on aggregate, Nacional won on penalties and advanced to the second stage.

=== Match E8 ===
20 February 2018
17:15 UTC−5

Sport Rosario (Peru)	0–0	(Uruguay) Cerro
	Report

Estadio Rosas Pampa, Huaraz
Attendance: 8,000
Referee: Andrés Rojas (Colombia)

7 March 2018
19:15 UTC−3

Cerro (Uruguay)	2–0	(Peru) Sport Rosario
López 65'; Zazpe 73'	Report

Estadio Luis Tróccoli, Montevideo
Attendance: 3,000
Referee: Éber Aquino (Paraguay)

Cerro won 2–0 on aggregate and advanced to the second stage.

=== Match E9 ===
12 April 2018
20:30 UTC−4

Sol de América (Paraguay)	2–0	(Colombia) Independiente Medellín
Zeballos 21', 49'	Report

Estadio Luis Alfonso Giagni, Villa Elisa
Attendance: 10,000
Referee: Michael Espinoza (Peru)

10 May 2018
19:45 UTC−5

Independiente Medellín (Colombia)	3–1	(Paraguay) Sol de América
Pertúz 20'; Cano 69' (pen.); Caicedo 76'	Report	Villagra 14'

Estadio Atanasio Girardot, Medellín
Attendance: 17,630
Referee: Raphael Claus (Brazil)

Tied 3–3 on aggregate, Sol de América won on away goals and advanced to the second stage.

=== Match E10 ===
20 February 2018
19:30 UTC−5

Barcelona (Ecuador)	0–0	(Paraguay) General Díaz
	Report

Estadio Monumental Isidro Romero Carbo, Guayaquil
Attendance: 15,000
Referee: Michael Espinoza (Peru)

7 March 2018
19:15 UTC−3

General Díaz (Paraguay)	2–1	(Ecuador) Barcelona
Espinoza 48'; Leichtweis 71' (pen.)	Report	Dinenno 60'

Estadio Feliciano Cáceres, Luque (Note: General Díaz played their home match at Estadio Feliciano Cáceres, Luque, instead of their regular stadium Estadio General Adrián Jara, Luque.)
Attendance: 2,000
Referee: Patricio Loustau (Argentina)

General Díaz won 2–1 on aggregate and advanced to the second stage.

=== Match E11 ===
13 February 2018
19:15 UTC−3

Sportivo Luqueño (Paraguay)	2–0	(Ecuador) Deportivo Cuenca
Armoa 19'; Bareiro 34'	Report

Estadio Feliciano Cáceres, Luque
Attendance: 15,000
Referee: Jorge Baliño (Argentina)

7 March 2018
19:45 UTC−5

Deportivo Cuenca (Ecuador)	2–0	(Paraguay) Sportivo Luqueño
Rojas 73'; Bonfigli 81'	Report
Penalties
Bonfigli (penalty scored); Quiñónez (penalty scored); Rojas (penalty scored); Porozo (penalty scored); Bedoya (penalty scored); Preciado (penalty scored)	6–5	(penalty scored) Dos Santos; (penalty scored) Riveros; (penalty scored) Medina; (penalty scored) Leguizamón; (penalty scored) Orsini; (penalty missed) Matto

Estadio Alejandro Serrano Aguilar, Cuenca
Attendance: 10,000
Referee: Gustavo Murillo (Colombia)

Tied 2–2 on aggregate, Deportivo Cuenca won on penalties and advanced to the second stage.

=== Match E12 ===
13 February 2018
17:15 UTC−5

UTC (Peru)	2–0	(Uruguay) Rampla Juniors
Ponce 33'; Cardoza 61'	Report

Estadio Miguel Grau, Callao (Note: UTC played their home match at Estadio Miguel Grau, Callao, instead of their regular stadium Estadio Héroes de San Ramón, Cajamarca.)
Attendance: 1,000
Referee: Dewson Freitas (Brazil)

8 March 2018
19:15 UTC−3

Rampla Juniors (Uruguay)	4–0	(Peru) UTC
Lalinde 13'; Olivera 21'; Igor Paim 59'; Rigoleto 83'	Report

Estadio Luis Franzini, Montevideo (Note: Rampla Juniors played their home match at Estadio Luis Franzini, Montevideo, instead of their regular stadium Estadio Olímpico, Montevideo.)
Attendance: 1,500
Referee: Carlos Orbe (Ecuador)

Rampla Juniors won 4–2 on aggregate and advanced to the second stage.

=== Match E13 ===
15 February 2018
21:30 UTC−3

Defensa y Justicia (Argentina)	0–1	(Colombia) América de Cali
	Report	Martínez Borja 43' (pen.)

Estadio Norberto Tomaghello, Gobernador Costa
Attendance: 10,000
Referee: Wilton Sampaio (Brazil)

8 March 2018
19:45 UTC−5

América de Cali (Colombia)	0–3	(Argentina) Defensa y Justicia
	Report	Márquez 13'; Miranda 64'; Fernández 83'

Estadio Pascual Guerrero, Cali
Attendance: 18,000
Referee: Ulises Mereles (Paraguay)

Defensa y Justicia won 3–1 on aggregate and advanced to the second stage.

=== Match E14 ===
12 April 2018
19:15 UTC−3

Atlético Paranaense (Brazil)	3–0	(Argentina) Newell's Old Boys
Pablo 9'; Nikão 30'; Guilherme 36'	Report

Arena da Baixada, Curitiba
Attendance: 11,010
Referee: Gery Vargas (Bolivia)

10 May 2018
19:15 UTC−3

Newell's Old Boys (Argentina)	2–1	(Brazil) Atlético Paranaense
Leal 36', 65'	Report	Nikão 85'

Estadio Marcelo Bielsa, Rosario
Attendance: 40,000
Referee: Carlos Orbe (Ecuador)

Atlético Paranaense won 4–2 on aggregate and advanced to the second stage.

=== Match E15 ===
15 February 2018
21:30 UTC−3

Unión Española (Chile)	0–0	(Peru) Sport Huancayo
	Report

Estadio Santa Laura, Independencia
Attendance: 3,602
Referee: Omar Ponce (Ecuador)

8 March 2018
19:45 UTC−5

Sport Huancayo (Peru)	3–0	(Chile) Unión Española
Trujillo 20'; Monsalvo 49'; Valverde 78'	Report

Estadio Huancayo, Huancayo
Attendance: 4,000
Referee: Jesús Valenzuela (Venezuela)

Sport Huancayo won 3–0 on aggregate and advanced to the second stage.

=== Match E16 ===
10 April 2018
17:15 UTC−5

Jaguares (Colombia)	2–1	(Uruguay) Boston River
Rojas 69' (pen.), 75'	Report	Mastriani 54'

Estadio Jaraguay, Montería
Attendance: 4,000
Referee: Fernando Echenique (Argentina)

10 May 2018
19:15 UTC−3

Boston River (Uruguay)	3–0	(Colombia) Jaguares
Scotti 41', 53'; Pereyra 46'	Report

Estadio Luis Franzini, Montevideo (Note: Boston River played their home match at Estadio Luis Franzini, Montevideo, instead of their regular stadium Estadio Parque Artigas, Las Piedras.)
Attendance: 1,000
Referee: Raúl Orosco (Bolivia)

Boston River won 4–2 on aggregate and advanced to the second stage.

=== Match E17 ===
12 April 2018
21:30 UTC−3

Rosario Central (Argentina)	0–0	(Brazil) São Paulo
	Report

Estadio Gigante de Arroyito, Rosario
Attendance: 40,000
Referee: Víctor Carrillo (Peru)

9 May 2018
21:45 UTC−3

São Paulo (Brazil)	1–0	(Argentina) Rosario Central
Diego Souza 60'	Report

Estádio do Morumbi, São Paulo
Attendance: 33,862
Referee: Éber Aquino (Paraguay)

São Paulo won 1–0 on aggregate and advanced to the second stage.

=== Match E18 ===
22 February 2018
17:15 UTC−5

El Nacional (Ecuador)	3–2	(Bolivia) San José
Segovia 25'; Balda 37' (pen.); Angulo 69'	Report	Saucedo 22'; Ramallo 50'

Estadio Olímpico Atahualpa, Quito
Attendance: 7,000
Referee: Ulises Mereles (Paraguay)

6 March 2018
18:15 UTC−4

San José (Bolivia)	1–1	(Ecuador) El Nacional
Saucedo 58'	Report	Parrales 79'

Estadio Jesús Bermúdez, Oruro
Attendance: 20,000
Referee: José Argote (Venezuela)

El Nacional won 4–3 on aggregate and advanced to the second stage.

=== Match E19 ===
11 April 2018
20:45 UTC−4

Blooming (Bolivia)	1–0	(Brazil) Bahia
L. Vaca 49'	Report

Estadio Ramón Tahuichi Aguilera, Santa Cruz de la Sierra
Attendance: 10,000
Referee: Luis Quiroz (Ecuador)

23 May 2018 (Note: The Bahia v Blooming match was originally scheduled for 8 May 2018, 19:15 local time, but was re-scheduled to 23 May 2018, 21:45 local time, due to a clash with Bahia's round of 16 first leg in the 2018 Copa do Brasil.)
21:45 UTC−3

Bahia (Brazil)	4–0	(Bolivia) Blooming
Zé Rafael 26', 76'; Elton 50'; Júnior Brumado 90+2'	Report

Arena Fonte Nova, Salvador
Attendance: 10,073
Referee: Juan Soto (Venezuela)

Bahia won 4–1 on aggregate and advanced to the second stage.

=== Match E20 ===
13 February 2018
20:30 UTC−4

Zamora (Venezuela)	0–2	(Argentina) Colón
	Report	Correa 5'; Vera 85'

Estadio Agustín Tovar, Barinas
Attendance: 5,000
Referee: Arnaldo Samaniego (Paraguay)

6 March 2018
21:45 UTC−3

Colón (Argentina)	1–0	(Venezuela) Zamora
Conti 69'	Report

Estadio Brigadier General Estanislao López, Santa Fe
Attendance: 30,000
Referee: Jonhatan Fuentes (Uruguay)

Colón won 3–0 on aggregate and advanced to the second stage.

=== Match E21 ===
12 April 2018
19:15 UTC−3

Audax Italiano (Chile)	1–2	(Brazil) Botafogo
Santos 41'	Report	Brenner 71'; Rodrigo Pimpão 90'

Estadio San Carlos de Apoquindo, Las Condes (Note: Audax Italiano played their home match at Estadio San Carlos de Apoquindo, Las Condes, instead of their regular stadium Estadio Bicentenario de La Florida, La Florida.)
Attendance: 2,187
Referee: Andrés Rojas (Colombia)

9 May 2018
21:45 UTC−3

Botafogo (Brazil)	1–1	(Chile) Audax Italiano
Matheus Fernandes 57'	Report	Cabrera 84'

Estádio Olímpico Nilton Santos, Rio de Janeiro
Attendance: 8,970
Referee: Michael Espinoza (Peru)

Botafogo won 3–2 on aggregate and advanced to the second stage.

=== Match E22 ===
11 April 2018
21:45 UTC−3

Fluminense (Brazil)	3–0	(Bolivia) Nacional Potosí
Pablo Dyego 72'; Gum 81'; Pedro 88' (pen.)	Report

Estádio do Maracanã, Rio de Janeiro
Attendance: 6,892
Referee: Nicolás Gallo (Colombia)

10 May 2018
20:45 UTC−4

Nacional Potosí (Bolivia)	2–0	(Brazil) Fluminense
Reina 50', 60' (pen.)	Report

Estadio Víctor Agustín Ugarte, Potosí
Attendance: 5,000
Referee: Esteban Ostojich (Uruguay)

Fluminense won 3–2 on aggregate and advanced to the second stage.
