= Jefferson Intriago =

Ecuadorian footballer (born 1996)

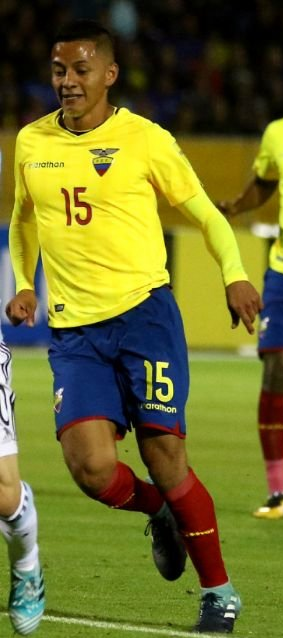
- Intriago with Ecuador in 2017

Personal information
- Full name: Jefferson Alfredo Intriago Mendoza
- Date of birth: 4 June 1996 (age 30)
- Place of birth: Junín, Ecuador
- Height: 1.72 m (5 ft 7 1/2 in)
- Position: Midfielder

Team information
- Current team: Barcelona de Guayaquil
- Number: 35

Youth career
- 2008–2010: JGHC
- 2010–2013: LDU Quito

Senior career*
Years	Team	Apps	(Gls)
2014–2019	LDU Quito	161	(6)
2019–2021	Juárez	61	(3)
2022–2026	Mazatlán	91	(1)
2026–	Barcelona de Guayaquil	0	(0)

International career^{‡}
2013	Ecuador U17	4	(0)
2015	Ecuador U20	4	(0)
2017–	Ecuador	8	(0)
- * Club domestic league appearances and goals as of 9 January 2026 ‡ National team caps and goals as of 16 June 2019

Jefferson Alfredo Intriago Mendoza (born 4 June 1996) is an Ecuadorian professional footballer who plays as a midfielder for LigaPro Serie A club Barcelona de Guayaquil.

== Club career ==
He began his career with LDU Quito in 2014.

== International career ==
Intriago made his international debut for Ecuador on 5 October 2017, against Chile.

== Career statistics ==
=== Club ===
As of match played 9 January 2026.

Club	Division	League			Cup		Continental		Total	
Club	Division	Season	Apps	Goals	Apps	Goals	Apps	Goals	Apps	Goals
LDU Quito	Ecuadorian Serie A	2014	33	0	—		—		33	0
LDU Quito	Ecuadorian Serie A	2015	27	1	—		4	0	31	1
LDU Quito	Ecuadorian Serie A	2016	17	0	—		0	0	17	0
LDU Quito	Ecuadorian Serie A	2017	33	0	—		6	0	39	0
LDU Quito	Ecuadorian Serie A	2018	39	3	—		4	0	43	3
LDU Quito	Ecuadorian Serie A	2019	12	2	0	0	6	0	18	2
LDU Quito	Total		161	6	0	0	20	0	181	6
Juárez	Liga MX	2019-20	23	1	4	0	—		27	1
Juárez	Liga MX	2020-21	25	0	—		—		25	0
Juárez	Liga MX	2021-22	13	2	—		—		13	2
Juárez	Total		61	3	4	0	0	0	65	3
Mazatlán	Liga MX	2021-22	18	0	—		—		18	0
Mazatlán	Liga MX	2022-23	27	0	—		—		27	0
Mazatlán	Liga MX	2023-24	28	1	—		3	0	31	1
Mazatlán	Liga MX	2024-25	16	0	—		—		16	0
Mazatlán	Liga MX	2025-26	2	0	—		—		2	0
Mazatlán	Total		91	1	0	0	3	0	94	1
Career total			313	10	4	0	23	0	340	10

== Honours ==
LDU Quito

- Ecuadorian Serie A: 2018
