= Franco López (Uruguayan footballer) =

Uruguayan association football player

Personal information
- Full name: Franco Sebastián López Taborda
- Date of birth: 20 October 1992 (age 34)
- Place of birth: Paysandú, Uruguay
- Height: 1.72 m (5 ft 8 in)
- Position: Forward

Team information
- Current team: Paysandú

Youth career
- Centenario Uruguayo

Senior career*
Years	Team	Apps	(Gls)
2013–2016	El Tanque Sisley	42	(9)
2017–2021	Cerro	97	(14)
2021	Racing Montevideo	2	(0)
2022–2024	Progreso	59	(24)
2024	Deportes Tolima	8	(1)
2025	Unión La Calera	11	(0)
2025	Progreso	14	(5)
2026	Cerro Largo	0	(0)
2026–	Paysandú	0	(0)
- * Club domestic league appearances and goals as of 25 January 2026

Franco Sebastián López Taborda (born 20 October 1992) is a Uruguayan footballer who plays as a forward for Uruguayan Segunda División club Paysandú.

He has played over 140 games in the Uruguayan Primera División for El Tanque Sisley, Cerro and Progreso, in addition to over 50 in the Uruguayan Segunda División for El Tanque Sisley, Racing Club and Progreso.

== Club career ==
=== El Tanque Sisley ===
Born in Paysandú, López began his professional career at El Tanque Sisley. He made his debut in the Uruguayan Primera División on 14 February 2015, playing the final three minutes of a 1–0 home win over Montevideo Wanderers as a substitute for Facundo Barceló. He played seven games over the season, all from the bench, and scored once on 7 June in a 4–2 win at Atenas in the last game of the campaign; the result kept his team in the top flight at the expense of the opponents.

In 2016, López contributed 8 goals in 12 games as they won promotion back as champions of the Uruguayan Segunda División, including two on 16 October in a 3–2 win at Deportivo Maldonado.

=== Cerro ===
In January 2017, López transferred to fellow top-flight club Cerro. On 14 May, his team won 3–2 at Peñarol to end that team's unbeaten season in the 14th game; he was sent off in added time after coming on as a late substitute.

López scored on his continental debut on 7 March 2018, opening a 2–0 win over Peru's Sport Rosario in the Copa Sudamericana first stage second leg. He scored six goals in the domestic season, including two on 13 May in a 2–2 home draw with Nacional.

=== Racing Club and Progreso ===
Following Cerro's relegation, López signed for Racing Club de Montevideo ahead of the 2021 Uruguayan Segunda División season.

The next season he transferred to Progreso in the same league, contributing 14 goals to their promotion as runners-up in 2023. This included a hat-trick on 10 March in a 5–0 home win over Atenas in the second game of the season.

=== Deportes Tolima ===
After scoring 10 goals in 17 games for Progreso, making him the second highest scorer by that point in the Uruguayan Primera División, López transferred to Deportes Tolima in the Colombian Categoría Primera A in June 2024.

=== Unión La Calera ===
In January 2025, López moved to Chile and joined Unión La Calera.

=== Back to Uruguay ===
Back to Uruguay in the second half of 2025, López joined Progreso. Following Progreso, he signed with Cerro Largo, but he ended his contract and switched to Paysandú in January 2026.

== Career statistics ==
=== Club ===
As of match played 15 September 2024

Appearances and goals by club, season and competition
Club	Season	League			Continental		Total	
Club	Season	Division	Apps	Goals	Apps	Goals	Apps	Goalsx
El Tanque Sisley	2014-15	Uruguayan Primera División	7	1	—		7	1
El Tanque Sisley	2015-16	Uruguayan Primera División	23	0	—		23	0
El Tanque Sisley	2016	Uruguayan Segunda División	12	8	—		12	8
El Tanque Sisley	Total		42	9	—		42	9
Cerro	2017	Uruguayan Primera División	26	4	0	0	26	4
Cerro	2018	Uruguayan Primera División	30	6	3 (Note: Appearance(s) in Copa Sudamericana)	1	33	7
Cerro	2019	Uruguayan Primera División	11	1	—		11	1
Cerro	2020	Uruguayan Primera División	30	3	—		30	3
Cerro	Total		97	14	3	1	100	15
Racing Club	2021	Uruguayan Segunda División	1	0	—		1	0
Progreso	2022	Uruguayan Segunda División	9	0	—		9	0
Progreso	2023	Uruguayan Segunda División	33	14	—		33	14
Progreso	2024	Uruguayan Primera División	17	10	—		17	10
Progreso	Total		59	24	—		59	24
Deportes Tolima	2024	Categoría Primera A	3	1	—		3	1
Career Total			202	48	3	1	205	49

== Honours ==
El Tanque Sisley

- Uruguayan Segunda División: 2016
