= Jonathan Borja =

Ecuadorian footballer (born 1994)

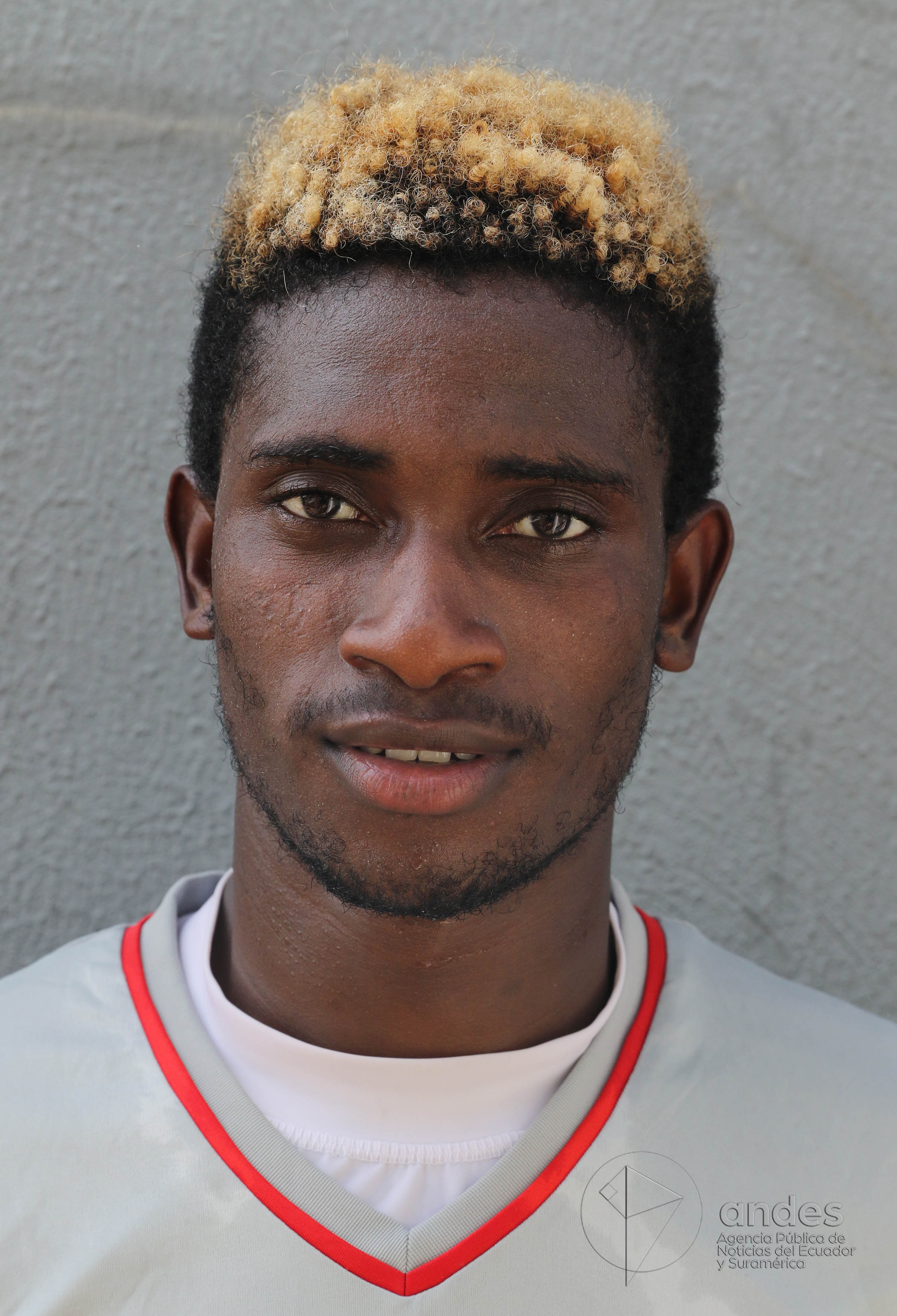

Personal information
- Full name: Jonathan Darwin Borja Colorado
- Date of birth: 5 April 1994 (age 32)
- Place of birth: Ibarra, Ecuador
- Height: 1.78 m (5 ft 10 in)
- Position: Midfielder

Team information
- Current team: El Nacional
- Number: 10

Youth career
- 2008: Valle del Chota
- 2010–2013: Universidad Católica
- 2012: → Deportivo Quito (loan)

Senior career*
Years	Team	Apps	(Gls)
2012	→ Deportivo Quevedo (loan)	8	(0)
2013	→ América de Quito (loan)	7	(3)
2014	Deportivo Quito	5	(0)
2015–2017	América de Quito	7	(1)
2015	→ LDU Loja (loan)	13	(3)
2016	→ Guayaquil City (loan)	1	(0)
2016	→ Aucas (loan)	16	(1)
2017–2022	El Nacional	33	(9)
2018–2019	→ LDU Quito (loan)	25	(1)
2020–2021	→ Cruz Azul (loan)	4	(0)
2022	Always Ready	5	(1)
2023	Mushuc Runa	15	(1)
2024–	El Nacional	22	(3)

International career^{‡}
2019–	Ecuador	1	(0)
- * Club domestic league appearances and goals as of 2 March 2025 ‡ National team caps and goals as of 6 September 2019

Jonathan Darwin Borja Colorado (born 5 April 1994) is an Ecuadorian footballer who plays for El Nacional in the Ecuadorian Serie A.

== Club career ==
He began his career with Deportivo Quevedo in 2012.

== Career statistics ==
As of December 8, 2018

Club	Season	League		International		Total	
Club	Season	Apps	Goals	Apps	Goals	Apps	Goals
Deportivo Quevedo	2012	8	0	—	—	8	0
Deportivo Quevedo	Total	8	0	—	—	8	0
América de Quito	2013	7	3	—	—	7	3
América de Quito	Total	7	3	—	—	7	3
Deportivo Quito	2014	5	0	—	—	5	0
Deportivo Quito	Total	5	0	—	—	5	0
América de Quito	2015	7	1	—	—	7	1
América de Quito	Total	7	1	—	—	7	1
L.D.U. Loja	2015	13	3	—	—	13	3
L.D.U. Loja	Total	13	3	—	—	13	3
Guayaquil City	2016	1	0	—	—	1	0
Guayaquil City	Total	1	0	—	—	1	0
Aucas	2016	16	1	—	—	16	1
Aucas	Total	16	1	—	—	16	1
El Nacional	2017	33	9	1	0	34	9
El Nacional	Total	33	9	1	0	34	9
L.D.U. Quito	2018	25	1	5	0	30	1
L.D.U. Quito	Total	25	1	5	0	30	1
Career total		115	18	6	0	121	18

== Honours ==
LDU Quito

- Ecuadorian Serie A: 2018
