= Julio Angulo =

Ecuadorian footballer (born 1990)

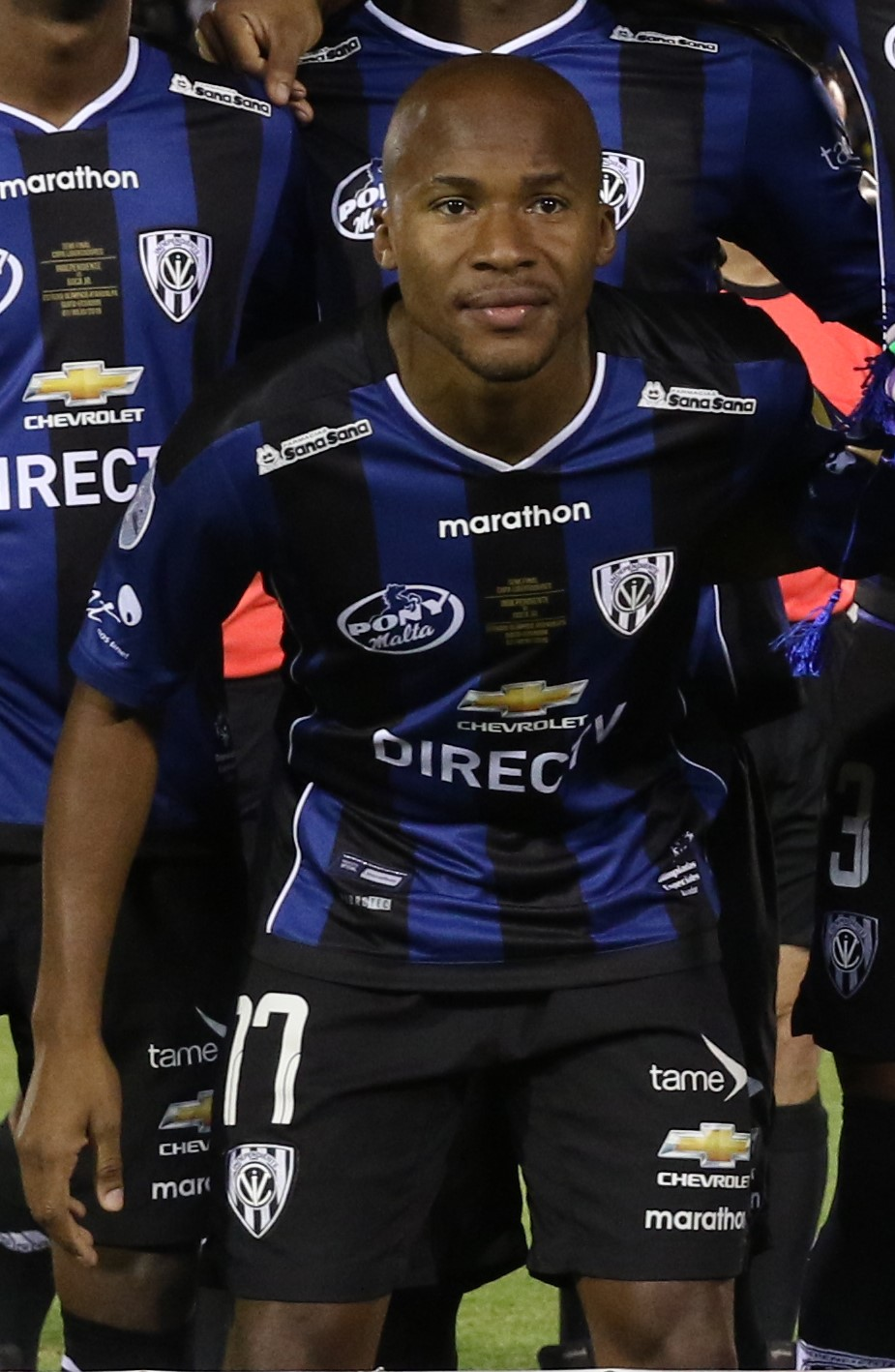
- Angulo in 2016

Personal information
- Full name: Julio Eduardo Angulo Medina
- Date of birth: May 28, 1990 (age 36)
- Place of birth: Guayaquil, Ecuador
- Height: 1.80 m (5 ft 11 in)
- Position: Attacking midfielder

Youth career
- 2004–2009: Barcelona SC

Senior career*
| Years | Team | Apps | (Gls) |
| 2009–2010 | Barcelona SC | 14 | (0) |
| 2011–2013 | Deportivo Cuenca | 62 | (5) |
| 2013–2016 | Independiente del Valle | 105 | (9) |
| 2016–2018 | Huracán | 27 | (0) |
| 2018 | → Club Tijuana (loan) | 5 | (0) |
| 2018–2019 | LDU Quito | 25 | (1) |
| 2020 | Mushuc Runa | 27 | (5) |
| 2021–2022 | Orense | 0 | (0) |
- * Club domestic league appearances and goals as of 20:20, 21 December 2020 (UTC)

Julio Eduardo Angulo Medina (born May 28, 1990) is an Ecuadorian footballer. He currently plays as a forward.

== Club career ==
Angulo began his career as a professional footballer at Barcelona SC. The club's new head coach Benito Floro requested his presence for the motivated project called La Renovacion.

== Honours ==
Independiente del Valle

- Copa Libertadores Runner Up (1): 2016

LDU Quito

- Ecuadorian Serie A: 2018
