= Andrés Pérez (footballer, born 1980) =

Colombian footballer

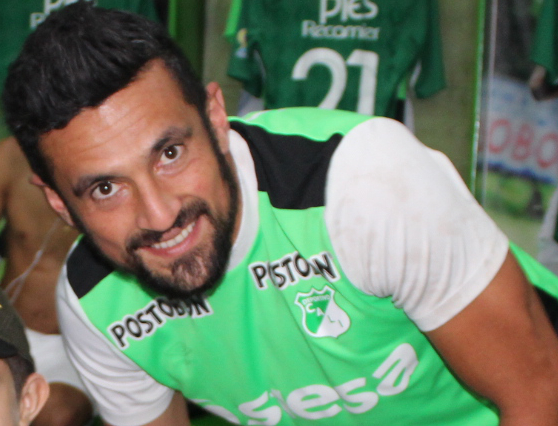
- Andrés Pérez in 2016

Personal information
- Full name: Andrés Eduardo Pérez
- Date of birth: September 5, 1980 (age 46)
- Place of birth: Bogotá, Colombia
- Height: 1.78 m (5 ft 10 in)
- Position: Midfielder

Senior career*
| Years | Team | Apps | (Gls) |
| 1999 | Real Cartagena | 10 | (0) |
| 1999–2004 | Millonarios | 201 | (6) |
| 2004–2005 | Quilmes | 31 | (1) |
| 2005–2006 | San Lorenzo | 11 | (2) |
| 2006–2007 | Arsenal de Sarandí | 5 | (1) |
| 2007–2008 | Millonarios | 30 | (1) |
| 2009–2018 | Deportivo Cali | 239 | (11) |
| 2019–2021 | Independiente Santa Fe | 52 | (1) |

International career
| 2001–2004 | Colombia | 4 | (0) |
- * Club domestic league appearances and goals as of 15:07, 29 December 2021 (UTC)

Andrés Eduardo Pérez (born 9 September 1980) is a retired Colombian footballer who played as a midfielder.
