= Daniel Giraldo =

Colombian footballer (born 1992)

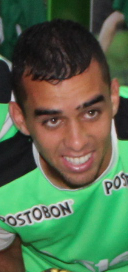

Personal information
- Full name: Daniel Eduardo Giraldo Cárdenas
- Date of birth: 1 July 1992 (age 34)
- Place of birth: Cali, Colombia
- Height: 1.78 m (5 ft 10 in)
- Position: Midfielder

Team information
- Current team: Deportivo Cali
- Number: 8

Youth career
- Deportivo Cali

Senior career*
| Years | Team | Apps | (Gls) |
| 2009–2018 | Deportivo Cali | 85 | (1) |
| 2014–2015 | → Olhanense (loan) | 36 | (1) |
| 2019 | Deportivo Pasto | 26 | (0) |
| 2019–2021 | Santa Fe | 68 | (5) |
| 2021 | Millonarios | 20 | (2) |
| 2022 | Atlético Junior | 43 | (2) |
| 2023–2024 | Millonarios | 77 | (2) |
| 2025 | Juventude | 24 | (0) |
| 2026– | Deportivo Cali | 13 | (0) |

International career^{‡}
| 2022– | Colombia | 1 | (0) |
- * Club domestic league appearances and goals as of 15 December 2025 ‡ National team caps and goals as of 12:01, 19 January 2022 (UTC)

Daniel Eduardo Giraldo Cárdenas (born 1 July 1992) is a Colombian footballer who plays for Deportivo Cali.

== International career ==
Giraldo made his debut for the Colombia national team on 16 January 2022 in a 2–1 home win over Honduras.

== Career statistics ==
| Club | Division | Season | League | | National cup | | Europe | | Total | |
| Club | Division | Season | Apps | Goals | Apps | Goals | Apps | Goals | Apps | Goals |
|---|---|---|---|---|---|---|---|---|---|---|
| Deportivo Cali | Categoría Primera A | 2009 | 0 | 0 | 1 | 0 | – | | 1 | 0 |
| Deportivo Cali | Categoría Primera A | 2010 | 0 | 0 | 1 | 0 | – | | 1 | 0 |
| Deportivo Cali | Categoría Primera A | 2011 | 7 | 0 | 7 | 0 | 1 | 0 | 15 | 0 |
| Deportivo Cali | Categoría Primera A | 2012 | 2 | 0 | 6 | 0 | – | | 8 | 0 |
| Deportivo Cali | Categoría Primera A | 2013 | 7 | 0 | 8 | 1 | – | | 15 | 1 |
| Deportivo Cali | Categoría Primera A | 2016 | 26 | 1 | 4 | 0 | 1 | 0 | 31 | 1 |
| Deportivo Cali | Categoría Primera A | 2017 | 23 | 0 | 9 | 0 | 2 | 0 | 34 | 0 |
| Deportivo Cali | Categoría Primera A | 2018 | 20 | 0 | 2 | 0 | 8 | 0 | 30 | 0 |
| Deportivo Cali | Total | | 85 | 1 | 38 | 1 | 12 | 0 | 135 | 2 |
| Olhanense | Segunda Liga | 2014-15 | 24 | 1 | 3 | 0 | – | | 27 | 1 |
| Olhanense | LigaPro | 2015-16 | 12 | 0 | 1 | 0 | – | | 13 | 0 |
| Olhanense | Total | | 36 | 1 | 4 | 0 | 0 | 0 | 40 | 1 |
| Deportivo Pasto | Categoría Primera A | 2019 | 26 | 0 | – | | – | | 26 | 0 |
| Santa Fe | Categoría Primera A | 2019 | 24 | 0 | 2 | 0 | – | | 26 | 0 |
| Santa Fe | Categoría Primera A | 2020 | 25 | 4 | 1 | 0 | – | | 26 | 4 |
| Santa Fe | Categoría Primera A | 2021 | 19 | 1 | – | | 6 | 1 | 25 | 2 |
| Santa Fe | Total | | 68 | 5 | 3 | 0 | 6 | 1 | 77 | 6 |
| Atlético Junior | Categoría Primera A | 2022 | 43 | 2 | 7 | 0 | 7 | 0 | 57 | 2 |
| Millonarios | Categoría Primera A | 2021 | 20 | 2 | 1 | 0 | – | | 21 | 2 |
| Millonarios | Categoría Primera A | 2023 | 41 | 1 | 7 | 0 | 10 | 0 | 58 | 1 |
| Millonarios | Categoría Primera A | 2024 | 36 | 1 | 4 | 0 | 6 | 0 | 46 | 1 |
| Millonarios | Total | | 97 | 4 | 12 | 0 | 16 | 0 | 125 | 4 |
| Career total | | | 280 | 12 | 52 | 1 | 34 | 1 | 366 | 14 |

== Honours ==
Deportivo Cali

- Copa Colombia: 2010

Millonarios

- Categoría Primera A: 2023–I
- Superliga Colombiana: 2024
