= Gastón Rodríguez (footballer, born 1992) =

Uruguayan footballer (born 1992)

Personal information
- Full name: Gastón Rodríguez Maeso
- Date of birth: 23 March 1992 (age 34)
- Place of birth: Montevideo, Uruguay
- Height: 1.87 m (6 ft 1 1/2 in)
- Position: Forward

Team information
- Current team: Union Comercio

Youth career
- Club 3 de Abril
- Danubio
- Montevideo Wanderers

Senior career*
Years	Team	Apps	(Gls)
2011–2016	Montevideo Wanderers	121	(43)
2016–2019	Peñarol	56	(7)
2018	→ LDU Quito (loan)	38	(6)
2020–2022	Racing	0	(0)
2020–2021	→ Avaí (loan)	26	(7)
2021	→ Deportivo Cali (loan)	17	(6)
2022	Atenas	12	(0)
2022	Liverpool	13	(3)
2023	Blooming	26	(10)
2024	Cobreloa	10	(1)
2024	Cerro	9	(1)
2024-2025	Manama Club	2	(2)
2025	Guabirá	7	(1)
2026-	Union Comercio	0	(0)
- * Club domestic league appearances and goals as of 15 September 2025

Gastón Rodríguez Maeso (born 23 March 1992) is a Uruguayan footballer who plays for Union Comercio.

== Club career ==
Gastón started playing football at Club 3 de Abril. He later moved to Danubio F.C., before joining Montevideo Wanderers at the age of 15, where his older brother, Maxi Rodríguez, at the time also was playing.

In 2024, he moved to Chile and joined Cobreloa in the top division.

== Honours ==
LDU Quito

- Ecuadorian Serie A: 2018
