= Jhonny Quiñónez =

Ecuadorian footballer (born 1998)

Personal information
- Full name: Jhonny Raúl Quiñónez Ruiz
- Date of birth: 11 June 1998 (age 28)
- Place of birth: Quito, Ecuador
- Height: 1.82 m (6 ft 0 in)
- Position: Midfielder

Team information
- Current team: Barcelona SC (on loan from Independiente)
- Number: 28

Senior career*
Years	Team	Apps	(Gls)
2016–2023	Aucas	151	(29)
2019	→ Willem II (loan)	5	(0)
2024–	Independiente	11	(1)
2025–	→ Barcelona SC (loan)	19	(1)

International career^{‡}
2017	Ecuador U20	1	(0)
2019–	Ecuador	3	(1)
- * Club domestic league appearances and goals as of 20 August 2025 ‡ National team caps and goals as of 26 January 2022

Jhonny Raúl Quiñónez Ruiz (born 11 June 1998) is an Ecuadorian footballer who plays as a midfielder for Barcelona SC, on loan from Independiente.

== Club career ==
On 30 August 2019, Quiñónez signed with Willem II from Ecuador. On 15 September 2019, Quiñónez made his professional debut with Willem II in a 4–1 Eredivisie loss to Heracles.

== International career ==
He made his debut for the Ecuador national football team on 13 October 2019 in a friendly against Argentina.

=== International ===
As of 28 March 2023

Ecuador
Year	Apps	Goals
2019	1	0
2021	2	1
Total	3	1

List of international goals scored by Jhonny Quiñónez
No.	Date	Venue	Opponent	Score	Result	Competition
1	27 October 2021	Bank of America Stadium, Charlotte, United States	Mexico	1–0	3–2	Friendly
