= Marlon Mejía =

Ecuatorian footballer (born 1994)

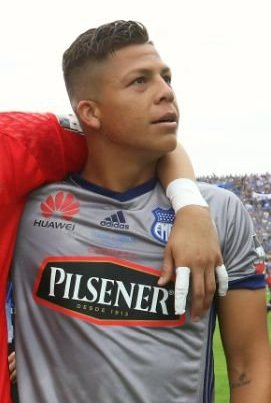
- Mejía with Emelec in 2017

Personal information
- Full name: Marlon Mauricio Mejía Díaz
- Date of birth: 21 September 1994 (age 32)
- Place of birth: Guayaquil, Ecuador
- Height: 1.80 m (5 ft 11 in)
- Position: Defender

Team information
- Current team: Guayaquil City
- Number: 26

Youth career
- –2011: Emelec

Senior career*
Years	Team	Apps	(Gls)
2012–2015	Emelec B		
2016–2022	Emelec	115	(3)
2016	→ Rocafuerte (loan)	12	(1)

International career^{‡}
2010–2011	Ecuador U-17	9	(0)
2014	Ecuador U-20	4	(0)
2021–	Ecuador	1	(0)
- * Club domestic league appearances and goals as of 5 November 2021 ‡ National team caps and goals as of 27 October 2021

Marlon Mauricio Mejía Díaz, known as Marlon Mejía (born 21 September 1994) is an Ecuadorian professional football player. He plays for Guayaquil City F.C.

== International career ==
He represented Ecuador at the 2011 FIFA U-17 World Cup.

He made his debut for the Ecuador national football team on 27 October 2021 in a friendly against Mexico.

== Career statistics ==
=== Club ===
As of 29 October 2024

Club	Division	League			Cup		Continental		Total	
Club	Division	Season	Apps	Goals	Apps	Goals	Apps	Goals	Apps	Goals
Rocafuerte	Segunda Categoría	2016	12	1	—		—		12	1
Emelec	Serie A	2016	2	0	—		—		2	0
Emelec	Serie A	2017	17	0	—		2	0	19	0
Emelec	Serie A	2018	35	0	—		5	0	40	0
Emelec	Serie A	2019	12	1	4	1	5	0	21	2
Emelec	Serie A	2020	19	1	—		4	0	23	1
Emelec	Serie A	2021	17	0	1	0	5	0	23	0
Emelec	Serie A	2022	13	1	2	0	2	0	17	1
Emelec	Total		115	3	7	1	23	0	145	4
Orense	Serie A	2023	6	0	0	0	—		6	0
Guayaquil City	Serie A	2023	6	0	0	0	—		6	0
Guayaquil City	Serie B	2024	31	1	3	0	—		34	1
Guayaquil City	Total		37	1	3	0	0	0	40	1
Career total			170	5	10	1	23	0	203	6

== Honours ==
Emelec

- Ecuadorian Serie A: 2013, 2014, 2015, 2017
