= Darío Tempesta =

Argentine footballer and manager

Personal information
- Full name: Osvaldo Darío Tempesta
- Date of birth: 15 February 1960 (age 66)
- Place of birth: Berisso, Argentina
- Position: Left back

Youth career
- Gimnasia La Plata

Senior career*
Years	Team	Apps	(Gls)
1980–1988	Gimnasia La Plata	108	(0)
1989–1990	Aldosivi	3	(0)

Managerial career
- 1997–1999: Cipolletti
- 1999–2000: Gimnasia y Tiro
- 2000–2001: Olimpo
- 2003–2004: Aldosivi
- 2004–2005: Guillermo Brown
- 2007: Guillermo Brown
- 2008–2009: Patronato
- 2010: Racing Córdoba
- 2010–2011: Sportivo Desamparados
- 2011: Central Córdoba
- 2012: Guillermo Brown
- 2012–2013: Douglas Haig
- 2013: Alvarado
- 2013–2014: Juventud Unida
- 2015: San Martín (T)
- 2016: El Tanque Sisley
- 2017: Aucas
- 2018: LDU Portoviejo
- 2018: Aucas
- 2020: América de Quito
- 2020–2021: Aucas
- * Club domestic league appearances and goals

Osvaldo Darío Tempesta (born 15 February 1960) is an Argentine football manager and former player who played as a left back.

== Career ==
Born in Berisso, Tempesta played the most of his playing career with Gimnasia La Plata. In 1990, after one year at Aldosivi, he retired at the age of 30.

After working as a youth coordinator at Gimnasia y Esgrima La Plata, Tempesta started his managerial career in 1997, with Primera B Nacional side Cipolletti. He was subsequently in charge of fellow league team Gimnasia y Tiro, suffering relegation in 2000.

For the 2000–01 season, Tempesta was in charge of Olimpo. He was named at the helm of Aldosivi in the Torneo Argentino A in 2003, but resigned in February 2004, after alleging "personal problems".

In 2008, after two different stints at Guillermo Brown, Tempesta was appointed manager of Patronato. He was named in charge of Racing de Córdoba in February 2010, but moved to Sportivo Desamparados in May.

Tempesta took over Central Córdoba in 2011, but resigned in July of that year. He returned to Brown in March 2012, before moving to Douglas Haig in November.

On 5 March 2013, Tempesta was named Alvarado manager. In June 2013, he took over Juventud Unida, but resigned on 27 October 2014.

On 9 January 2015, Tempesta was appointed in charge of San Martín de Tucumán. He resigned on 31 May, and subsequently moved abroad to take over Uruguayan Primera División side El Tanque Sisley.

On 3 April 2017, Tempesta moved to Ecuador to work at Aucas. After achieving promotion from the Serie B with the club, he left, and was appointed in charge of LDU Portoviejo in June 2018.

Tempesta left LDU in July 2018, and returned to Aucas on 2 September. He left in December, and spent a year without a club before joining América de Quito in January 2020.

On 14 June 2020, Tempesta returned to Aucas for a third spell.
