= Anderson Julio =

Ecuadorian footballer (born 1996)

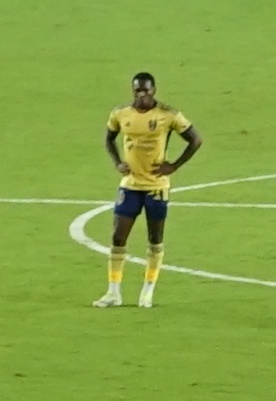
- Julio with Real Salt Lake in 2024

Personal information
- Full name: Anderson Andrés Julio Santos
- Date of birth: 31 May 1996 (age 30)
- Place of birth: Pimampiro, Ecuador
- Height: 1.80 m (5 ft 11 in)
- Positions: Winger; forward

Team information
- Current team: FC Dallas
- Number: 11

Youth career
- 2008–2009: Valle del Chota
- 2010–2015: L.D.U. Quito

Senior career*
Years	Team	Apps	(Gls)
2016–2019	L.D.U. Quito	109	(23)
2020–2021	Atlético San Luis	20	(0)
2021–2024	Real Salt Lake	111	(25)
2025–	FC Dallas	12	(4)

International career^{‡}
2023–	Ecuador	1	(0)
- * Club domestic league appearances and goals as of 04:25, 30 November 2024 (UTC) ‡ National team caps and goals as of 16:57, 12 June 2023 (UTC)

Anderson Andrés Julio Santos (born 31 May 1996) is an Ecuadorian professional footballer who plays as a forward for Major League Soccer club FC Dallas.

== Club career ==
He began his career with L.D.U. Quito in 2016.

=== Real Salt Lake ===
Julio was loaned to the Major League Soccer side Real Salt Lake on 12 March 2021. He scored a brace in his debut for the club on 24 April 2021, in a 2–1 road win against Minnesota United. San Luis and Real Salt Lake came to an agreement on a transfer and Julio joined the Major League Soccer side full time on 28 April 2022, signing a three-year deal. Julio won Goal of the Matchday for Matchday 16 on 29 May 2024.

=== FC Dallas ===
Julio was traded to Major League Soccer team FC Dallas on 23 December 2024 for defender Sam Junqua and up to $500,000 in General Allocation Money (GAM). In his debut game for the side on 22 February 2024 against the Houston Dynamo, he scored the game-winning goal, his first for FC Dallas.

== Career statistics ==
As of December 15, 2019

Club	Season	League		Continental		Cup		Other		Total	
Club	Season	Apps	Goals	Apps	Goals	Apps	Goals	Apps	Goals	Apps	Goals
L.D.U. Quito	2016	14	2	—	—	—	—	—	—	14	2
L.D.U. Quito	2017	21	2	3	0	—	—	2	0	26	2
L.D.U. Quito	2018	45	12	6	1	—	—	—	—	51	13
L.D.U. Quito	2019	29	7	9	3	5	0	—	—	43	10
L.D.U. Quito	Total	109	23	18	4	5	0	2	0	134	27
Career total		109	23	18	4	5	0	2	0	134	27

=== International ===
As of 20 June 2023

Ecuador
Year	Apps	Goals
2023	1	0
Total	1	0

== Honours ==
LDU Quito

- Ecuadorian Serie A: 2018
- Copa Ecuador: 2019
