= Roberto Garcés =

Ecuadorian footballer (born 1993)

Personal information
- Full name: Roberto Daniel Garcés Salazar
- Date of birth: 7 June 1993 (age 33)
- Place of birth: Quito, Ecuador
- Height: 1.78 m (5 ft 10 in)
- Position: Midfielder

Team information
- Current team: Emelec
- Number: 25

Youth career
- 2011–2012: Aucas

Senior career*
Years	Team	Apps	(Gls)
2013–2015	Aucas	55	(0)
2015	Deportivo Quito	0	(0)
2016–2018	El Nacional	109	(2)
2019	LDU Quito	0	(0)
2019	Independiente del Valle	19	(1)
2020–2021	Macará	1	(0)
2022–	Emelec	45	(0)
2023	→ Libertad (loan)	27	(5)
- * Club domestic league appearances and goals as of 20 August 2025

Roberto Daniel Garcés Salazar (born 7 June 1993) is an Ecuadorian footballer who plays for C.S. Emelec.

== Club career ==
He began his career with Aucas in 2013.

== Career statistics ==
As of December 8, 2018

Club	Season	League		International		Total	
Club	Season	Apps	Goals	Apps	Goals	Apps	Goals
Aucas	2013	17	0	—	—	17	0
Aucas	2014	38	0	—	—	38	0
Aucas	2015	0	0	—	—	0	0
Aucas	Total	55	0	—	—	55	0
Deportivo Quito	2015	0	0	—	—	0	0
Deportivo Quito	Total	0	0	—	—	0	0
El Nacional	2016	33	1	—	—	33	1
El Nacional	2017	37	1	2	0	39	1
El Nacional	2018	39	0	4	0	43	0
El Nacional	Total	109	2	6	0	115	2
L.D.U. Quito	2019	0	0	0	0	0	0
L.D.U. Quito	Total	0	0	0	0	0	0
Career total		164	2	6	0	170	2
