= Didier Delgado =

Colombian footballer (born 1992)

Personal information
- Full name: Didier Delgado Delgado
- Date of birth: 25 July 1992 (age 34)
- Place of birth: Istmina, Colombia
- Height: 1.81 m (5 ft 11 in)
- Position: Right-back

Youth career
- Deportes Tolima

Senior career*
Years	Team	Apps	(Gls)
2013–2017	Deportes Tolima	117	(4)
2017–2019	Deportivo Cali	57	(4)
2019–2020	Independiente Medellín	20	(1)
2021	Ionikos	1	(0)
- * Club domestic league appearances and goals as of 7 November 2021

Didier Delgado Delgado (born 25 July 1992) is a Colombian professional footballer who plays as a right-back.

== Honours ==
Deportes Tolima

- Copa Colombia: 2014

Independiente Medellín

- Copa Colombia: 2019
