= Juan Manuel Tévez =

Argentine footballer

Personal information
- Full name: Juan Manuel Tévez
- Date of birth: 28 August 1987 (age 39)
- Place of birth: Buenos Aires, Argentina
- Height: 1.86 m (6 ft 1 in)
- Position: Forward

Team information
- Current team: Cusco FC
- Number: 11

Youth career
- Guillermo Brown

Senior career*
Years	Team	Apps	(Gls)
2008–2015	Guillermo Brown	138	(37)
2013–2014	→ Talleres (loan)	20	(2)
2014–2015	→ Unión La Calera (loan)	21	(6)
2016	Coquimbo Unido	15	(6)
2017–2018	Macará	86	(35)
2019–2022	Aucas	59	(13)
2020–2021	→ Universidad Católica (loan)	58	(10)
2023	Gimnasia de Jujuy	34	(6)
2024–	Cusco FC	72	(22)
- * Club domestic league appearances and goals as of 1 December 2025

Juan Manuel Tévez (born August 28, 1987, in Puerto Belgrano (Buenos Aires), Argentina) is an Argentine footballer who plays as a forward for Cusco FC in the Peruvian Primera División.

== Teams ==
- (Argentina) Guillermo Brown 2008–2013
- (Argentina) Talleres de Córdoba 2013–2014
- (Chile) Unión La Calera 2014–2015
- (Argentina) Guillermo Brown 2015
- (Chile) Coquimbo Unido 2016
- (Ecuador) Macará 2017–2018
- (Ecuador) Aucas 2019
- (Ecuador) Universidad Católica 2020–2021
- (Ecuador) Aucas 2022
- (Argentina) Gimnasia de Jujuy 2023

== Honours ==
Aucas

- Ecuadorian Serie A: 2022
