= 2018 Ecuadorian Serie A =

Copa Lubricantes Havoline
- Season: 2018
- Dates: 16 February – 16 December 2018
- Champions: LDU Quito (11th title)
- Copa Libertadores: LDU Quito; Emelec; Barcelona; Delfín
- Copa Sudamericana: Universidad Católica; Macará; Independiente del Valle
- Matches: 266
- Goals: 688 (2.59 per match)
- Top goalscorer: Jhon Cifuente (37 goals)
- Biggest home win: Macará 6–1 Guayaquil City (2 December)
- Biggest away win: Guayaquil City 0–3 Emelec (5 March); El Nacional 0–3 Delfín (7 July); Macará 0–3 Técnico Universitario (24 August); Guayaquil City 1–4 LDU Quito (25 August); Guayaquil City 1–4 Emelec (24 November)
- Highest scoring: Técnico Universitario 4–5 U. Católica (24 September)

The 2018 Campeonato Ecuatoriano de Fútbol Serie A (officially known as the Campeonato Ecuatoriano - Copa Lubricantes Havoline 2018 for sponsorship reasons) was the 60th season of the Serie A, Ecuador's top tier football league. Emelec were the defending champions. First stage winners LDU Quito defeated second stage winners and defending champions Emelec 2–1 on aggregate in the final (third stage) to win their eleventh domestic title.

== Teams ==
Twelve teams competed in the 2018 Serie A season, ten of whom took part in the previous season. Clan Juvenil and Fuerza Amarilla were relegated from the Serie A after accumulating the fewest points during the 2017 season. They were replaced by Técnico Universitario and Aucas, the 2017 Serie B winner and runner-up, respectively. Técnico Universitario were in their 25th top-flight appearance and their first one since 2012, while Aucas returned to the Serie A for their 37th appearance after just one season in the second tier.

=== Stadia and locations ===
Locations of the 2018 Serie A teams.

Team	Home city	Stadium	Capacity
Aucas	Quito	Gonzalo Pozo Ripalda	21,689
Barcelona	Guayaquil	Monumental Banco Pichincha	57,267
Delfín	Manta	Jocay	17,834
Deportivo Cuenca	Cuenca	Banco del Austro Alejandro Serrano Aguilar	18,549
El Nacional	Quito	Olímpico Atahualpa	35,258
Emelec	Guayaquil	Banco del Pacífico Capwell	38,963
Guayaquil City	Guayaquil	Christian Benítez Betancourt^{a}	10,152
Independiente del Valle	Sangolquí	Rumiñahui	7,233
LDU Quito	Quito	Rodrigo Paz Delgado	41,575
Macará	Ambato	Bellavista	16,467
Técnico Universitario	Ambato	Bellavista	16,467
Universidad Católica	Quito	Olímpico Atahualpa	35,258

a: Guayaquil City played its home matches between February and early-June at Estadio Monumental Banco Pichincha and Estadio George Capwell in Guayaquil due to remodeling works at Estadio Christian Benítez Betancourt.

=== Personnel and kits ===
Team	Manager	Kit manufacturer	Shirt sponsor
Aucas	(Argentina) Darío Tempesta	Umbro	CNT; Banco del Pacífico
Barcelona	(Uruguay) Guillermo Almada	Marathon	Pilsener
Delfín	(Argentina) Fabián Bustos	Spyro	La Esquina de Ales
Deportivo Cuenca	(Venezuela) Richard Páez	Joma	Chubb Seguros
El Nacional	(Uruguay) Eduardo Favaro	Lotto	Aceros ANDEC; Banco General Rumiñahui
Emelec	(Argentina) Mariano Soso	Adidas	Electrocables
Guayaquil City	(Ecuador) Pool Gavilánez	Astro	DirecTV
Independiente del Valle	(Spain) Ismael Rescalvo	Marathon	Chevrolet; DirecTV
LDU Quito	(Uruguay) Pablo Repetto	Puma	Chevrolet
Macará	(Ecuador) Paúl Vélez	Boman	Cooperativa San Francisco Ltda.
Técnico Universitario	(Argentina) Fabián Frías	Boman	Cooperativa San Francisco Ltda.
Universidad Católica	(Colombia) Santiago Escobar	Umbro	Discover Card

=== Managerial changes ===
Team	Outgoing manager	Manner of departure	Date of vacancy	Position in table	Incoming manager	Date of appointment
First stage
Deportivo Cuenca	(Argentina) Gabriel Schürrer	Resigned	9 December 2017	Pre-season	(Argentina) Aníbal Biggeri	9 December 2017
Independiente del Valle	(Colombia) Alexis Mendoza	Sacked	9 December 2017	Pre-season	(Argentina) Gabriel Schürrer	12 December 2017
Delfín	(Uruguay) Guillermo Sanguinetti	Sacked	15 April 2018	9th	(Argentina) Fabián Bustos	15 April 2018
Deportivo Cuenca	(Argentina) Aníbal Biggeri	Sacked	17 April 2018	11th	(Uruguay) Juan Ramón Silva (caretaker)	17 April 2018
Deportivo Cuenca	(Uruguay) Juan Ramón Silva	End of caretaker tenure	27 April 2018	11th	(Uruguay) Guillermo Sanguinetti	30 April 2018
Emelec	(Uruguay) Alfredo Arias	Resigned	19 May 2018	4th	(Ecuador) Javier Klimowicz (caretaker)	22 May 2018
Emelec	(Ecuador) Javier Klimowicz	End of caretaker tenure	27 May 2018	4th	(Argentina) Mariano Soso	28 May 2018
Deportivo Cuenca	(Uruguay) Guillermo Sanguinetti	Signed by Santa Fe	11 June 2018	11th	(Uruguay) Juan Ramón Silva (caretaker)	11 June 2018
Deportivo Cuenca	(Uruguay) Juan Ramón Silva	End of caretaker tenure	20 June 2018	11th	(Venezuela) Richard Páez	21 June 2018
Independiente del Valle	(Argentina) Gabriel Schürrer	Mutual consent	28 June 2018	6th	(Ecuador) Álvaro Carcelén (caretaker)	28 June 2018
Independiente del Valle	(Ecuador) Álvaro Carcelén	End of caretaker tenure	30 June 2018	6th	(Spain) Ismael Rescalvo	1 July 2018
Second stage
Técnico Universitario	(Ecuador) Patricio Hurtado	Sacked	23 July 2018	12th	(Argentina) Fabián Frías	24 July 2018
Aucas	(Argentina) Luis Soler	Sacked	30 August 2018	11th	(Argentina) Darío Tempesta	1 September 2018

== First stage ==
The First stage began on February 16 and is scheduled to end on July 16.

Pos	Team	Pld	W	D	L	GF	GA	GD	Pts	Qualification
1	LDU Quito	22	14	4	4	32	18	+14	46	Qualification to Third stage and Copa Libertadores group stage
2	Barcelona	22	13	6	3	41	21	+20	45	
3	Universidad Católica	22	11	5	6	40	28	+12	38	
4	Emelec	22	11	4	7	34	27	+7	37	
5	Delfín	22	10	3	9	35	34	+1	33	
6	Independiente del Valle	22	9	4	9	30	27	+3	31	
7	Aucas	22	6	11	5	25	18	+7	29	
8	Macará	22	7	6	9	25	29	−4	27	
9	El Nacional	22	6	5	11	24	35	−11	23	
10	Deportivo Cuenca	22	5	7	10	21	33	−12	22	
11	Guayaquil City	22	3	7	12	15	28	−13	16	
12	Técnico Universitario	22	3	6	13	15	39	−24	15	

Source: FEF, Soccerway
Rules for classification: 1) Points, 2) Goal difference, 3) Goals for, 4) Away goals for, 5) Goals against, 6) Head-to-head record, 7) Penalty shootout.
If a penalty shootout is not possible: 7) Drawing of lots or playoff game.

=== Results ===
Home \ Away	AUC	BAR	DEL	CUE	NAC	EME	GUA	IDV	LDQ	MAC	TEC	CAT
Aucas	—	1–1	0–0	4–0	3–0	2–0	1–1	3–1	0–0	0–1	1–1	0–1
Barcelona	1–1	—	5–1	2–0	5–1	3–1	0–2	0–0	0–1	4–1	2–0	3–2
Delfín	1–1	0–1	—	4–2	1–3	3–1	1–0	2–1	2–1	1–1	3–1	5–2
Deportivo Cuenca	1–1	0–1	2–1	—	0–0	2–0	1–1	1–2	2–1	1–1	1–1	1–1
El Nacional	1–2	2–2	0–3	1–0	—	1–2	3–1	1–2	2–1	1–2	3–2	0–0
Emelec	1–0	2–2	2–1	4–1	1–0	—	2–1	2–1	0–1	2–0	3–0	2–3
Guayaquil City	2–2	0–1	0–1	1–0	2–1	0–3	—	0–1	0–0	0–2	0–0	1–1
Independiente del Valle	1–0	2–2	0–1	3–1	0–1	0–2	1–1	—	2–3	2–0	3–0	2–1
LDU Quito	1–1	2–1	3–0	0–2	1–0	1–1	2–1	2–1	—	2–1	4–0	2–1
Macará	1–1	0–1	2–1	1–1	2–0	2–2	2–0	1–3	0–1	—	1–1	1–2
Técnico Universitario	0–1	0–1	3–2	0–1	2–2	1–1	1–0	2–1	0–1	0–2	—	0–2
Universidad Católica	2–0	2–3	3–1	3–1	1–1	2–0	2–1	1–1	1–2	3–1	4–0	—

Source: FEF, Soccerway
Legend: Blue = home team win; Yellow = draw; Red = away team win.

== Second stage ==
The Second stage began on July 20 and ended on December 8.

Pos	Team	Pld	W	D	L	GF	GA	GD	Pts	Qualification
1	Emelec	22	12	5	5	35	17	+18	41	Qualification to Third stage and Copa Libertadores group stage
2	Macará	22	10	8	4	31	24	+7	38	
3	LDU Quito	22	9	10	3	32	19	+13	37	
4	Delfín	22	9	9	4	34	22	+12	36	
5	Barcelona	22	9	8	5	28	21	+7	35	
6	Independiente del Valle	22	9	6	7	31	24	+7	33	
7	Aucas	22	10	3	9	25	25	0	33	
8	Universidad Católica	22	8	3	11	29	32	−3	27	
9	Técnico Universitario	22	8	3	11	33	38	−5	27	
10	Deportivo Cuenca	22	6	5	11	23	31	−8	23	
11	El Nacional	22	3	7	12	29	47	−18	16	
12	Guayaquil City	22	3	5	14	19	49	−30	14	

Source: FEF, Soccerway
Rules for classification: 1) Points, 2) Goal difference, 3) Goals for, 4) Away goals for, 5) Goals against, 6) Head-to-head record, 7) Penalty shootout.
If a penalty shootout is not possible: 7) Drawing of lots or playoff game.

=== Results ===
Home \ Away	AUC	BAR	DEL	CUE	NAC	EME	GUA	IDV	LDQ	MAC	TEC	CAT
Aucas	—	0–0	2–0	1–3	3–2	0–1	1–0	1–1	1–3	2–1	3–0	0–1
Barcelona	3–1	—	2–2	2–1	3–1	1–0	0–1	2–0	1–1	1–1	2–1	2–0
Delfín	1–0	1–0	—	3–0	5–1	2–1	3–0	1–1	2–0	0–0	1–1	1–2
Deportivo Cuenca	0–1	1–1	0–1	—	2–0	0–2	0–0	0–1	2–2	1–1	1–3	2–1
El Nacional	1–2	0–0	3–3	3–1	—	1–1	1–1	1–1	2–2	1–2	1–2	1–3
Emelec	2–0	2–0	1–1	1–0	3–1	—	3–0	0–0	0–0	3–1	3–0	3–1
Guayaquil City	0–2	3–4	0–2	1–1	1–0	1–4	—	1–2	1–4	1–1	2–3	2–1
Independiente del Valle	0–1	1–0	3–1	2–3	4–2	3–1	4–0	—	1–1	0–1	1–1	1–3
LDU Quito	1–1	0–0	0–0	1–0	4–0	2–1	4–1	1–0	—	0–0	1–1	1–0
Macará	2–1	1–0	1–1	2–1	2–2	1–1	6–1	2–1	3–2	—	0–3	1–2
Técnico Universitario	3–0	1–2	2–1	1–2	1–3	1–2	3–2	0–2	2–1	0–1	—	4–5
Universidad Católica	0–2	2–2	2–2	1–2	1–2	1–0	0–0	1–2	0–1	0–1	2–0	—

Source: FEF, Soccerway
Legend: Blue = home team win; Yellow = draw; Red = away team win.

== Third stage ==
LDU Quito and Emelec qualified to the Finals (Third stage) by being the First stage and Second stage winners, respectively. The winners were the Serie A champions and earned the Ecuador 1 berth in the 2019 Copa Libertadores, and the losers were the Serie A runners-up and earned the Ecuador 2 berth in the 2019 Copa Libertadores. By having the greater number of points in the aggregate table, LDU Quito played the second leg at home.

12 December 2018
20:00 UTC−5

Emelec	1–1	LDU Quito
Angulo 45+1'	Report	A. Julio 59'

Estadio George Capwell, Guayaquil
Referee: Carlos Orbe

16 December 2018
12:00 UTC−5

LDU Quito	1–0	Emelec
A. Julio 10'	Report

Estadio Rodrigo Paz Delgado, Quito
Referee: Luis Quiroz

LDU Quito won 2–1 on aggregate.

Campeonato Ecuatoriano de Fútbol
2018 Serie A champions

11th title

== Aggregate table ==
Pos	Team	Pld	W	D	L	GF	GA	GD	Pts	Qualification
1	LDU Quito (C)	44	23	14	7	64	37	+27	83	Qualification to Copa Libertadores group stage
2	Barcelona	44	22	14	8	69	42	+27	80	Qualification to Copa Libertadores second stage
3	Emelec	44	23	9	12	69	44	+25	78	Qualification to Copa Libertadores group stage
4	Delfín	44	19	12	13	69	56	+13	69	Qualification to Copa Libertadores first stage
5	Universidad Católica	44	19	8	17	69	60	+9	65	Qualification to Copa Sudamericana first stage
6	Macará	44	17	14	13	56	53	+3	65	Qualification to Copa Sudamericana first stage
7	Independiente del Valle	44	18	10	16	61	51	+10	64	Qualification to Copa Sudamericana first stage
8	Aucas	44	16	14	14	50	43	+7	62	Qualification to Copa Sudamericana playoff
9	Deportivo Cuenca	44	11	12	21	44	64	−20	45	
10	Técnico Universitario	44	11	9	24	48	77	−29	42	
11	El Nacional	44	9	12	23	53	82	−29	39	
12	Guayaquil City	44	6	12	26	34	77	−43	30	

Source: FEF
Rules for classification: 1) Points, 2) Goal difference, 3) Goals for, 4) Away goals for, 5) Goals against, 6) Head-to-head record, 7) Penalty shootout.
If a penalty shootout is not possible: 7) Drawing of lots or playoff game.
(C) Champions

== Copa Sudamericana playoff ==
The Copa Sudamericana playoff was played between:

- Aucas (Aggregate table 4th best team not qualified for 2019 Copa Libertadores)
- Mushuc Runa (2018 Serie B champions)

The winners qualified for the 2019 Copa Sudamericana first stage.

11 December 2018
12:00 UTC−5

Mushuc Runa	1–0	Aucas
Fábio Renato 88'	Report

Estadio Mushuc Runa, Ambato
Referee: Marlon Vera

15 December 2018
12:00 UTC−5

Aucas	2–2	Mushuc Runa
Montaño 72'; Govea 86'	Report	Estupiñán 42'; Rivas 70'

Estadio Gonzalo Pozo Ripalda, Quito
Referee: Vinicio Espinel

Mushuc Runa won 3–2 on aggregate.

== Top goalscorers ==
Rank	Name	Club	Goals
1	(Ecuador) Jhon Cifuente	Universidad Católica	37
2	(Ecuador) Brayan Angulo	Emelec	29
3	(Ecuador) Edson Montaño	Aucas	25
4	(Ecuador) Carlos Garcés	Delfín	19
5	(Argentina) Juan Manuel Tévez	Macará	18
6	(Ecuador) Juan Anangonó	LDU Quito	16
6	(Ecuador) Luis Chicaiza	Delfín	16
6	(Argentina) Juan Dinenno	Barcelona	16
9	(Ecuador) Diego Armas	Técnico Universitario	13
10	(Ecuador) Anderson Julio	LDU Quito	12

Source: FEF
