= 2012 Barcelona Sporting Club season =

Ecuadorian football club season

Barcelona Sporting Club's 2012 season was the club's 87th year of existence, the 59th year in professional football, and the 54th in the top level of professional football in Ecuador.

== Competitions ==
=== Pre-season friendlies ===
January 15	Barcelona	1–1	Aucas	Quito
13:00	N. Mina 18'	Report	G. Figueroa 46'	Stadium: Est. del Aucas; Attendance: 8,000; Referee: Diego Lara

January 18	Barcelona	4–1	U. Católica	Quito
	N. Mina 18'; D. Díaz 16' (pen.); 55'; J. Perlaza 29'		Player ? 50'	Stadium: Casa de la Selección

January 18	Barcelona	1–0	U. Católica	Quito
	J. Ayoví 18'			Stadium: Casa de la Selección; Attendance: Sin; Referee: Sin especificar

January 21	Barcelona	3–1	Ferroviarios	Guayaquil
	N. Mina; P. Lugüercio		B. Tobar	Stadium: Est. Monumental Banco Pichincha; Attendance: Sin; Referee: Sin especificar

January 22	Deportivo Quevedo	3–0	Barcelona	Quevedo
	P. Quiñónez 56'; C. Arboleda 68'; J. Contreras 71'			Stadium: Est. 7 de Octubre

January 24	Barcelona	3–1	Orense S.C.	Machala
19:30	N. Mina 7'; J. Campos 13'; E. Montaño 82'		Jugador ?	Stadium: Est. 9 de Mayo

January 28 Noche; Amarilla	Barcelona	1–1	Santa Fé	Guayaquil
	D. Díaz 70' (pen.)	Report	D. Cabrera 20'	Stadium: Est. Monumental Banco Pichincha; Attendance: c. 65,000; Referee: Daniel Salazar

February 1	Barcelona	0–0	Millonarios	Portoviejo
				Stadium: Est. Reales Tamarindos; Referee: Alfredo Intriago

February 7	Rocafuerte	2–1	Barcelona	Guayaquil
	K. Arroyo; A. Angulo	Report	M. Oyola	Stadium: Complejo de Rocafuerte F.C.

=== Serie A ===
==== First stage ====
February 5 Round 1	Barcelona	3–1	Deportivo Cuenca	Guayaquil
16:30	P. Lugüercio 5'; N. Mina 81'; 90'	Report	B. Cano 56'	Stadium: Est. Monumental Banco Pichincha; Attendance: 34.042; Referee: Roddy Zambrano

February 12 Round 2	Técnico Universitario	1–1	Barcelona	Ambato
13:00	J. Campos 6' (a.g.)	Report	N. Mina 73'	Stadium: Est. Bellavista; Attendance: 15,839; Referee: José Espinel

February 26 Round 3	Barcelona	0 - 0	Liga de Loja	Guayaquil
16:00		Report		Stadium: Est. Monumental Banco Pichincha; Attendance: 17,271; Referee: Diego Lara

March 28 Round 4	El Nacional	0–2	Barcelona	Quito
	López (yellow card) 52'; Minda (yellow card) 63'; Chila (yellow card) 82'	Summary	Quiñónez (yellow card) 40'; Mina 60' (yellow card) 61'; Matamoros (yellow card) 75' (goal) 83'	Stadium: Est. Olímpico Atahualpa; Referee: Daniel Salazar

March 4 Round 5	Barcelona	1–1	Independiente	Guayaquil
16:10	M. Oyola 4'	Report	V. Angulo 12'	Stadium: Est. Monumental Banco Pichincha; Attendance: 15,903; Referee: Omar Ponce

April 19 Round 6	Barcelona	1–1	Emelec	Guayaquil
	Diaz (yellow card) 45'; Mina 53' (pen.); Ibarra (yellow card) 57'; Matarmoros (yellow card) 80'	Summary	Valencia 19' (yellow card) 45'; Quiñónez (yellow card) 45'; Dreer (yellow card) 45+3'; Quiñónez (yellow card) 52'; Gaibor (yellow card) 65'	Stadium: Est. Monumental Banco Pichincha; Referee: Alfredo Intriago

March 18 Round 7	Macará	1–0	Barcelona	Ambato
	O. Guerra 63'	Report		Stadium: Est. Bellavista; Attendance: 9,202; Referee: Alfredo Intriago

March 24 Round 8	Barcelona	4–0	Olmedo	Guayaquil
	L. Caicedo 12'; 44'; 48'; N. Mina 89' (pen.)	Report		Stadium: Est. Monumental Banco Pichincha; Attendance: 6,939; Referee: José Espinel

April 1 Round 9	Manta FC	0–1	Barcelona	Manta
	Gómez (yellow card) 25'; Klever Andrade (yellow card) 30'; Carlos Garces (yellow card) 87'; Miña (yellow card) 90'	Summary	Quiñónez (yellow card) 11'; Perlaza 15'; Diaz (yellow card) 30'; Amaya (yellow card) 85'	Stadium: Est. Jocay; Referee: Diego Lara

April 8 Round 10	Barcelona	1–1	Liga de Quito	Guayaquil
	Mina 3' (pen.); Quiñónez (yellow card) 53'; Oyola (yellow card) 72'; Diaz (yellow card) 73'	Summary	Elvis Bone (yellow card) 29'; Luna (yellow card) 58'; Calderón (yellow card) 66'; Méndez (yellow card) 78'; Bieler 90'	Stadium: Est. Monumental Banco Pichincha; Referee: Carlos Vera

April 14 Round 11	Deportivo Quito	3–0	Barcelona	Quito
	Escalada 36'; Vaca 43'; Arroyo (yellow card) 50'; Elizaga (yellow card) 67'; Barahona (yellow card) 82'; Acosta (yellow card) 81' (goal) 90+3'	Summary	Campos (yellow card) 85'	Stadium: Est. Olímpico Atahualpa; Referee: Samuel Haro

April 22 Round 12	Barcelona	0–0	Deportivo Quito	Guayaquil
	Amaya (yellow card) 17'; Saucedo (yellow card) 85'	Summary	Bolaños (yellow card) 31'	Stadium: Est. Monumental Banco Pichincha; Referee: Oscar Ponze

April 29 Round 13	Liga de Quito	2–2	Barcelona	Quito
	José Francisco Cevallos, Jr. 16'; Calderón 57'; Luna (yellow card) 59'; Nahuelpan (yellow card) 74'	Summary	Mina 45+1'; Erazo 61'; Caicedo (yellow card) 76'; Campos (yellow card) 84'; Jose Ayovi (yellow card) 87'	Stadium: Est. Casa Blanca; Referee: Jose Luis Espinel

6 May Round 14	Barcelona	4–0	Manta FC	Guayaquil
	Quiñónez 26', 85'; Saucedo (yellow card) 31'; Mina 39' (pen.); Campos (yellow card) 44'; Luis García Anchundia 54'; Oyola (yellow card) 83'	Report	Christian Márquez (yellow card) 31'; Jéfferson Sierra (yellow card) 34'; Éder Valencia (yellow card) 37'	Stadium: Est. Monumental Banco Pichincha; Referee: Robinson Galarza

May 13 Round 15	Olmedo	0–2	Barcelona	Riobamba
	Dennis Corozo (yellow card) 74'	Report	Quiñónez 6'; Ibarra (yellow card) 56'; Mina 82'	Stadium: Est. Olímpico

May 20 Round 16	Barcelona	4–1	Macará	Guayaquil
	Quiñónez (yellow card) 19'; Jose Ayovi 26'; Díaz (yellow card) 61'; Amaya 63'; Mina 70'; Matamoros 84'; Lugüercio (yellow card) 89'	Report	Bryan Rodríguez (yellow card) 26'; Frańcisco Mendoza (red card) 27'; Jhonny Baldeón (yellow card) 45'; Carlos Quìntero 58'	Stadium: Est. Monumental Banco Pichincha

June 14 Round 17	Emelec	0–1	Barcelona	Guayaquil
	Achilier (yellow card) 43'; Valencia (yellow card) 50'; Mondaini (yellow card) 68'	Report	Caicedo (yellow card) 38'; Mina 49' (yellow card) 50'; Banguera (yellow card) 63'	Stadium: Est. George Capwell; Referee: Omar Ponce

May 24 Round 18	Independiente	0–2	Barcelona	Sangolquí
	Balbuena (red card) 39'; Guerrero (red card) 45'; Andi Caicedo (yellow card) 68'	Report	Mina 10'; Jose Ayovi 33'; Matamoros (yellow card) 61'	Stadium: Est. Rumiñahui; Referee: Alfredo Intriago

June 17 Round 19	Barcelona	1–2	El Nacional	Guayaquil
	Perlaza (yellow card) 14' (yellow-red card) 29'; Erazo 40'; Caicedo (yellow card) 57'; Banguera (yellow card) 68'; Saucedo (yellow card) 77'	Report	Batioja (yellow card) 21'; Caicedo 22'; Juan Luis Anangonó 51' (yellow card) 81'; Ricardo Iván López (yellow card) 79'	Stadium: Est. Monumental Banco Pichincha; Referee: Daniel Salazar

June 23 Round 20	Liga de Loja	0–0	Barcelona	Loja
	Cristian Quiñónez (yellow card) 7'; José Antonio Aguirre (yellow card) 15'; Jonny Uchuari (yellow card) 80'	Report	Saucedo (yellow card) 36'; Campos (yellow card) 45'; Matamoros (yellow card) 86'	Stadium: Est. Reina del Cisne; Referee: Carlos Vera

July 1 Round 21	Barcelona	3–0	Técnico	Guayaquil
	Campos (yellow card) 30'; Caicedo 35' (yellow card) 63'; Díaz 75' (yellow card) 76'; Jose Ayovi 80'	Report	Camacho (yellow card) 16'; Luìs Santana (yellow card) 47'	Stadium: Est. Monumental Banco Pichincha; Referee: Alfredo Intriago

July 8 Round 22	Deportivo Cuenca	1–0	Barcelona	Cuenca
	Cano 14'	Report		Stadium: Est. Alejandro Serrano Aguilar; Attendance: 19.532; Referee: José Luis Espinel

==== Second stage ====
July 15 Round 1	Olmedo	1–2	Barcelona	Riobamba
12:00	S. Souza 35'	Report	J. Ladines 40'; N. Mina 77'	Stadium: Est. Olímpico; Attendance: 11.984; Referee: Roberto Almant

July 21 Round 2	Barcelona	4–0	Macará	Guayaquil
18:00	N. Mina 15'; 37'; 76'; 90+1'	Report		Stadium: Est. Monumental Banco Pichincha; Attendance: 17.877; Referee: Roddy Zambrano

July 29 Round 4	Barcelona	1–0	Deportivo Quito	Guayaquil
16:30	H. Matamoros 70' (pen.)	Report		Stadium: Est. Monumental Banco Pichincha; Attendance: 22.566; Referee: Daniel Salazar

August 1 Round 3	Manta FC	1–1	Barcelona	Machala
19:30	A. Sánchez 17'	Report	J. Ferreyra 12'	Stadium: Est. 9 de Mayo; Attendance: 12.568; Referee: Samuel Haro

August 5 Round 5	Liga de Quito	2–2	Barcelona	Quito
11:30	C. Bieler 59'; 90+3'	Report	D. Díaz 56'; 80'	Stadium: Est. Casa Blanca; Attendance: 17.725; Referee: Carlos Vera

August 12 Round 6	Emelec	1–2	Barcelona	Guayaquil
17:00	E. Corozo 85'	Report	D. Díaz 67'; N. Mina 83'	Stadium: Est. George Capwell; Attendance: 15.975; Referee: Diego Lara

August 19 Round 7	Barcelona	0–1	Técnico Universitario	Guayaquil
16:30		Report	A. Colón 22'	Stadium: Est. Monumental Banco Pichincha; Attendance: 32.959; Referee: Carlos Orbe

August 24 Round 8	Deportivo Cuenca	1–2	Barcelona	Cuenca
20:00	M. Castillo 51'	Report	N. Mina 20'; M. Oyola 69'	Stadium: Est. Alejandro Serrano Aguilar; Attendance: 13.375; Referee: Omar Ponce

September 15 Round 10	Independiente	1–1	Barcelona	Quito
13:15	D. Samaniego 77' (pen.)	Report	B. De La Torre 85'	Stadium: Est. Olímpico Atahualpa; Attendance: 10903; Referee: Diego Lara

September 23 Round 12	El Nacional	2–1	Barcelona	Quito
12:00	E. Preciado 58'; M. Caicedo 73'	Report	M. Banguera 90+4' (pen.)	Stadium: Est. Olímpico Atahualpa; Attendance: 20.721; Referee: José Espinel

September 30 Round 13	Barcelona	2–2	Independiente	Guayaquil
16:30	M. Arroyo 46'; 72'	Report	D. Angulo 56'; E. Balbuena 88'	Stadium: Est. Monumental Banco Pichincha; Attendance: 17.883; Referee: Robinson Galarza

October 3 Round 14	Liga de Loja	0–1	Barcelona	Loja
20:00		Report	R. Revoredo 30'	Stadium: Est. Reina del Cisne; Attendance: 11.592; Referee: Diego Lara

October 21 Round 15	Barcelona	4–1	Deportivo Cuenca	Guayaquil
17:00	D. Díaz 20'; H. Matamoros 36'; M. Arroyo 58'; N. Mina 62'	Report	J. Angulo 73'	Stadium: Est. Monumental Banco Pichincha; Attendance: 16.374; Referee: Miguel Hidalgo

October 28 Round 16	Técnico Universitario	3–2	Barcelona	Ambato
12:00	J. Perlaza 48' (a.g.); J. Arraya 55'; A. Colón 68'	Report	N. Mina 9'; M. Arroyo 84' (pen.)	Stadium: Est. Bellavista; Attendance: 8.839; Referee: Roddy Zambrano

November 4 Round 17	Barcelona	5–0	Emelec	Guayaquil
15:00	D. Díaz 38'; 62'; N. Mina 45+1'; 47'; M. Arroyo 58' (pen.)	Report		Stadium: Est. Monumental Banco Pichincha; Attendance: 34.336; Referee: Omar Ponce

November 7 Round 9	Barcelona	1–1	Liga de Loja	Guayaquil
19:30	H. Matamoros 37'	Report	F. Renato 42' (pen.)	Stadium: Est. Monumental Banco Pichincha; Attendance: 7.396; Referee: José Espinel

November 11 Round 18	Barcelona	1–0	Liga de Quito	Guayaquil
17:00	J. Ayoví 45+1'	Report		Stadium: Est. Monumental Banco Pichincha; Attendance: 28.539; Referee: Daniel Salazar

November 14 Round 11	Barcelona	3–1	El Nacional	Guayaquil
19:30	N. Mina 14'; 81'; J. Amaya 25'	Report	D. Bone 46'	Stadium: Est. Monumental Banco Pichincha; Attendance: 19.824; Referee: Roddy Zambrano

November 18 Round 19	Deportivo Quito	0–2	Barcelona	Quito
12:00		Report	N. Mina 12'; M. Arroyo 90+2'	Stadium: Est. Olímpico Atahualpa; Attendance: 23.234; Referee: Carlos Vera

November 21 Round 20	Barcelona	0–0	Manta FC	Guayaquil
19:30		Report		Stadium: Est. Monumental Banco Pichincha; Attendance: 29.634; Referee: Carlos Orbe

November 25 Round 21	Macará	0–2	Barcelona	Ambato
12:00		Report	J. Amaya 46'; N. Mina 76'	Stadium: Est. Bellavista; Attendance: 16.468; Referee: Omar Ponce

December 2 Round 22	Barcelona	3–1	Olmedo	Guayaquil
12:00	N. Mina 67' (pen.); 75'; J. Amaya 82'	Report	A. Vinueza 77'	Stadium: Est. Monumental Banco Pichincha; Attendance: 41.555; Referee: José Espinel
