= 2012 in Ecuadorian football =

Football in Ecuador
- Season: 2012

The 2012 season was the 90th season of competitive football in Ecuador.

== Clubs in international competition ==
Team	2012 Copa Libertadores	2012 Copa Sudamericana
Barcelona	N/A	Eliminated in the Round of 16
Deportivo Quito	Eliminated in the Round of 16	Eliminated in the Round of 16
El Nacional	Eliminated in the First Stage	N/A
Emelec	Eliminated in the Round of 16	Eliminated in the Round of 16
LDU Loja	N/A	Eliminated in the Round of 16

=== Barcelona ===
==== Copa Sudamericana ====
First Stage: Match G12 standings
Team	Pld	W	D	L	GF	GA	GD	Pts
(Ecuador) Barcelona	2	1	1	0	5	1	+4	4
(Venezuela) Deportivo Táchira	2	0	1	1	1	5	−4	1

July 25	Deportivo Táchira (Venezuela)	0–0	(Ecuador) Barcelona	San Cristóbal, Venezuela
20:00 UTC−04:30		Report		Stadium: Estadio Polideportivo de Pueblo Nuevo; Referee: Adrián Vélez (Colombia)

August 8	Barcelona (Ecuador)	5–1	(Venezuela) Deportivo Táchira	Guayaquil, Ecuador
17:15 UTC−05:00	Perlaza 14'; Quiñónez 32'; Oyola 43' (pen.); Matamoros 51'; De la Torre 64'	Report	González 80' (pen.)	Stadium: Estadio Monumental Isidro Romero Carbo; Referee: Néstor Pitana (Argentina)

Second Stage: Match O9 standings
Team	Pld	W	D	L	GF	GA	GD	Pts
(Ecuador) Barcelona	2	1	1	0	4	3	+1	4
(Chile) Cobreloa	2	0	1	1	3	4	−1	1

August 28	Cobreloa (Chile)	0–0	(Ecuador) Barcelona	Calama, Chile
18:15 UTC−04:00		Report		Stadium: Estadio Municipal de Calama; Referee: Julio Quintana (Paraguay)

September 19	Barcelona (Ecuador)	4–3	(Chile) Cobreloa	Guayaquil, Ecuador
18:15 UTC−05:00	Arroyo 6', 23'; Campos 17'; Díaz 73'	Report	Díaz 8'; Abarca 40'; Troncoso 55'	Stadium: Estadio Monumental Isidro Romero Carbo; Referee: Martín Vázquez (Uruguay)

Round of 16: Match H standings
Team	Pld	W	D	L	GF	GA	GD	Pts
(Brazil) Grêmio	2	2	0	0	3	1	+2	6
(Ecuador) Barcelona	2	0	0	2	1	3	−2	0

September 26	Barcelona (Ecuador)	0–1	(Brazil) Grêmio	Guayaquil, Ecuador
20:00 UTC−05:00		Report	Werley 44'	Stadium: Estadio Monumental Isidro Romero Carbo; Referee: Georges Buckley (Peru)

October 24	Grêmio (Brazil)	2–1	(Ecuador) Barcelona	Porto Alegre, Brazil
22:00 UTC−02:00	Perlaza 66' (o.g.); Zé Roberto 90+1'	Report	Mina 54'	Stadium: Estádio Olímpico Monumental; Referee: Patricio Loustau (Argentina)

=== Deportivo Quito ===
==== Copa Liberatores ====
Second Stage: Group 7 standings
Team	Pld	W	D	L	GF	GA	GD	Pts
(Argentina) Vélez Sársfield	6	4	0	2	10	6	+4	12
(Ecuador) Deportivo Quito	6	3	1	2	11	4	+7	10
(Uruguay) Defensor Sporting	6	3	0	3	6	7	−1	9
(Mexico) Guadalajara	6	1	1	4	2	12	−10	4

February 7	Guadalajara (Mexico)	1–1	(Ecuador) Deportivo Quito	Estadio Omnilife, Zapopan
20:15 UTC−06:00	Arellano 90+2'	Report	Alustiza 7'	Referee: Juan Soto (Venezuela)

February 14	Defensor Sporting (Uruguay)	2–0	(Ecuador) Deportivo Quito	Montevideo, Uruguay
20:00 UTC−02:00	Alemán 22' (pen.); Callorda 78'	Report		Stadium: Estadio Luis Franzini; Referee: Heber Lopes (Brazil)

March 7	Deportivo Quito (Ecuador)	3–0	(Argentina) Vélez Sársfield	Quito, Ecuador
17:45 UTC−05:00	Alustiza 45+3' (pen.); F. Martínez 47'; Saritama 70'	Report		Stadium: Estadio Olímpico Atahualpa; Referee: José Buitrago (Colombia)

March 22	Vélez Sársfield (Argentina)	1–0	(Ecuador) Deportivo Quito	Buenos Aires, Argentina
19:45 UTC−03:00	J. Martínez 89'	Report		Stadium: José Amalfitani Stadium; Referee: Wilson Seneme (Brazil)

April 10	Deportivo Quito (Ecuador)	2–0	(Uruguay) Defensor Sporting	Quito, Ecuador
16:30 UTC−05:00	Checa 36'; Bevacqua 63'	Report		Stadium: Estadio Olímpico Atahualpa; Referee: Víctor Hugo Carrillo (Peru)

April 17	Deportivo Quito (Ecuador)	5–0	(Mexico) Guadalajara	Quito, Ecuador
18:15 UTC−05:00	Alustiza 17', 27', 70', 86'; F. Martínez 64'	Report		Stadium: Estadio Olímpico Atahualpa; Referee: Wilmar Roldán (Colombia)

Round of 16: Match D standings
Team	Pld	W	D	L	GF	GA	GD	Pts
Universidad de Chile	2	1	0	1	7	4	+3	3
(Ecuador) Deportivo Quito	2	1	0	1	4	7	−3	3

May 3	Deportivo Quito (Ecuador)	4–1	Universidad de Chile	Quito, Ecuador
19:15 UTC−05:00	Alustiza 30', 56'; Checa 45'; Martínez 82'	Report	Rodríguez 36'	Stadium: Estadio Olímpico Atahualpa; Referee: Francisco Chacón (Mexico)

May 10	Universidad de Chile	6–0	(Ecuador) Deportivo Quito	Santiago, Chile
21:00 UTC−04:00	Fernándes 20', 27'; Díaz 35'; Mena 56'; Henríquez 70', 73'	Report		Stadium: Estadio Nacional Julio Martínez Prádanos; Referee: Néstor Pitana (Argentina)

==== Copa Sudamericana ====
First Stage: Match G14 standings
Team	Pld	W	D	L	GF	GA	GD	Pts
(Ecuador) Deportivo Quito	2	2	0	0	4	2	+2	6
(Peru) León de Huánuco	2	0	0	2	2	4	−2	0

August 1	Deportivo Quito (Ecuador)	1–0	(Peru) León de Huánuco	Quito, Ecuador
17:30 UTC−05:00	Cambindo 63' (o.g.)	Report		Stadium: Estadio Olímpico Atahualpa; Referee: José Buitrago (Colombia)

August 23	León de Huánuco (Peru)	2–3	(Ecuador) Deportivo Quito	Huánuco, Peru
14:00 UTC−05:00	Vásquez 10'; Quina 45+1'	Report	Bevacqua 12', 64'; Saritama 25' (pen.)	Stadium: Estadio Heraclio Tapia; Referee: Antonio Arias (Paraguay)

Second Stage: Match O13 standings
Team	Pld	W	D	L	GF	GA	GD	Pts
(Ecuador) Deportivo Quito	2	2	0	0	5	2	+3	6
(Bolivia) Aurora	2	0	0	2	2	5	−3	0

August 30	Deportivo Quito (Ecuador)	2–1	(Bolivia) Aurora	Quito, Ecuador
17:15 UTC−05:00	Checa 37'; Lorca 38'	Report	Da Silva 60'	Stadium: Estadio Olímpico Atahualpa; Referee: Julio Bascuñán (Chile)

September 18	Aurora (Bolivia)	1–3	(Ecuador) Deportivo Quito	Cochabamba, Bolivia
19:15 UTC−04:00	Olmedo 64'	Report	Bevacqua 14', 59'; Checa 35'	Stadium: Estadio Félix Capriles, Cochabamba; Referee: Ricardo Marques (Brazil)

Round of 16: Match D standings
Team	Pld	W	D	L	GF	GA	GD	Pts
(Argentina) Tigre	2	1	0	1	4	2	+2	3
(Ecuador) Deportivo Quito	2	1	0	1	2	4	−2	3

September 25	Deportivo Quito (Ecuador)	2–0	(Argentina) Tigre	Quito, Ecuador
17:15 UTC−05:00	Lorca 52'; Vila 85'	Report		Stadium: Estadio Olímpico Atahualpa; Referee: Adrián Vélez (Colombia)

October 25	Tigre (Argentina)	4–0	(Ecuador) Deportivo Quito	Victoria, Argentina
21:45 UTC−03:00	Maggiolo 10'; Díaz 77' (pen.); Donatti 85'; Botta 88'	Report		Stadium: Estadio José Dellagiovanna; Referee: Sandro Ricci (Brazil)

=== El Nacional ===
==== Copa Libertadores ====
First Stage: Match G4 standings
Team	Pld	W	D	L	GF	GA	GD	Pts
(Paraguay) Libertad	2	1	0	1	4	1	+3	3
(Ecuador) El Nacional	2	1	0	1	1	4	−3	3

January 24	El Nacional (Ecuador)	1–0	(Paraguay) Libertad	Quito, Ecuador
20:30 UTC−05:00	J. L. Anangonó 43'	Report		Stadium: Estadio Olímpico Atahualpa; Referee: Víctor Rivera (Peru)

January 31	Libertad (Paraguay)	4–1	(Ecuador) El Nacional	Asunción, Paraguay
20:00 UTC−03:00	Velázquez 1'; Núñez 29'; Gamarra 34'; Civelli 90+3'	Report	Minda 12'	Stadium: Estadio Dr. Nicolás Léoz; Referee: Sergio Pezzotta (Argentina)

== National teams ==
=== Senior team ===
==== 2014 FIFA World Cup qualification ====
June 2 Matchday 5	Argentina	4–0	Ecuador	Buenos Aires, Argentina
19:30 UTC−3	Agüero 19'; Higuaín 29'; Messi 31'; Di María 76'	Report		Stadium: Estadio Monumental Antonio Vespucio Liberti; Attendance: 50,000; Referee: Víctor Hugo Rivera (Peru)

June 10 Matchday 6	Ecuador	1–0	Colombia	Quito, Ecuador
16:00 UTC−5	Benítez 53'	Report		Stadium: Estadio Olímpico Atahualpa; Attendance: 37,353; Referee: Wilson Seneme (Brazil)

September 7 Matchday 7	Ecuador	1–0	Bolivia	Quito, Ecuador
16:00 UTC−5	Caicedo 73' (pen.)	Report		Stadium: Estadio Olímpico Atahualpa; Attendance: 32,213; Referee: Juan Soto (Venezuela)

September 11 Matchday 8	Uruguay	1–1	Ecuador	Montevideo, Uruguay
18:30 UTC−3	Cavani 66'	Report	Caicedo 7' (pen.)	Stadium: Estadio Centenario; Attendance: 38,000; Referee: Carlos Amarilla (Paraguay)

October 12 Matchday 9	Ecuador	3–1	Chile	Quito, Ecuador
16:00 UTC−5	Caicedo 33', 56' (pen.); Castillo 90+2'	Report	Paredes 25' (o.g.)	Stadium: Estadio Olímpico Atahualpa; Attendance: 32,600; Referee: Héber Lopes (Brazil)

October 16 Matchday 10	Venezuela	1–1	Ecuador	Puerto La Cruz, Venezuela
17:30 UTC−4:30	Arango 5'	Report	Castillo 23'	Stadium: Estadio José Antonio Anzoátegui; Attendance: 35,076; Referee: Néstor Pitana (Argentina)
