= 2016 Barcelona Sporting Club season =

Ecuadorian football club season

Barcelona
2016 season
- President: José Francisco Cevallos
- Manager: Guillermo Almada
- Stadium: Monumental Isidro Romero Carbo
- Serie A: 1st
- Copa Sudamericana: -
Home colours	Away colours	Third colours

Barcelona Sporting Club's 2016 season is the club 91st year of existence, and its 58th participation in the top level of professional football in Ecuador. Barcelona is one of the twelve participating clubs in the top flight of Ecuadorian Football Championship 2016. In addition to the national tournament, the "canarios" are going to play the Copa Sudamericana 2016.

== Pre-season and friendlies ==
Win Draw Loss

January 16	Esmeraldas Petrolero (Ecuador)	0 – 1	(Ecuador) Barcelona	Esmeraldas
20:00 (ECT)			Ismael Blanco 15'	Stadium: Estadio Folke Anderson; Referee: Augusto Aragón

January 21	Delfín (Ecuador)	1 – 1	(Ecuador) Barcelona	Manta
	Maxi Barreiro 25'		Richard Calderón 32'	Stadium: Estadio Jocay

January 22	Deportivo Cuenca (Ecuador)	2 – 0	(Ecuador) Barcelona	Cuenca
2	Christian Oña 64'; Walter Zea 86'			Stadium: Estadio Alejandro Serrano Aguilar

January 24	Aucas (Ecuador)	2 – 1	(Ecuador) Barcelona	Quito
	Esteban Solari 51'; Ayrton Preciado 87'		Ismael Blanco 19'	Stadium: Estadio Gonzalo Pozo Ripalda; Referee: Roddy Zambrano

January 27	Fuerza Amarilla (Ecuador)	0 – 0	(Ecuador) Barcelona	Machala
				Stadium: Estadio 9 de Mayo; Referee: Guillermo Guerrero Alcívar

January 29	Barcelona (Ecuador)	4 – 3	(Peru) Universidad de San Martín	Guayaquil
	Damián Díaz 05', 32'; Ismael Blanco 58'; Cristian Penilla 65'		Álvaro Ampuero 15'; Marcos Rivadero 30'; Junior Ponce 76'	Stadium: Estadio Monumental Isidro Romero Carbo; Referee: Daniel Salazar

== Competitions ==
=== Overview ===
Competition	Record							
Competition	Pld	W	D	L	GF	GA	GD	Win %
Serie A	29	21	2	6	66	25	+41	72.41
Copa Sudamericana	2	0	2	0	2	2	+0	0.00
Total	31	21	4	6	68	27	+41	67.74

Last updated: February 22, 2016
Source: Competitions

=== Serie A ===
==== First stage ====
===== Stage table =====
Pos	Team	Pld	W	D	L	GF	GA	GD	Pts	Qualification
1	Barcelona	22	15	2	5	51	19	+32	47	Third stage and 2017 Copa Libertadores group stage
2	Emelec	22	13	4	5	37	23	+14	43	
3	El Nacional	22	10	6	6	32	28	+4	36	
4	Deportivo Cuenca	22	9	7	6	29	25	+4	34	
5	Independiente del Valle	22	10	4	8	28	28	0	34	

===== Matches =====
Win Draw Loss

February 7 1	El Nacional	2 – 1	Barcelona	Quito
11:15 ECT (UTC-05:00)	Michael Estrada 27'; Pedro Larrea (yellow card) 44'; Michael Chalá (yellow card) 57'; Christian Lara (yellow card) 61', (goal) 83' (pen.)	Report	Oswaldo Minda (yellow card) 12'; Cristian Penilla 13'; Máximo Banguera (yellow card) 82'	Stadium: Olímpico Atahualpa; Attendance: 23,533; Referee: Roddy Zambrano

February 14 2	Barcelona	2 – 1	Delfín	Guayaquil
16:30 ECT (UTC-05:00)	Christian Suárez 11'; Cristian Penilla 43'; Darío Aimar (yellow card) 72'; Gabriel Marques (yellow card) 87'	Report	Pablo Saucedo (yellow card) 45'; Edison Preciado (yellow card) 56'; Cristian Márquez 90+4'	Stadium: Monumental Banco Pichincha; Attendance: 27,013; Referee: Mario Romero

February 17 3	River Ecuador	0 – 3	Barcelona	Guayaquil
19:30 ECT (UTC-05:00)	Jorge Yépez (yellow card) 30'	Report	Darío Aimar 11'; Jonathan Álvez 29' (pen.); Gabriel Marques (yellow card) 39'; Oswaldo Minda (yellow card) 52'; Cristian Penilla 72'; Damián Diaz (yellow card) 86'	Stadium: Christian Benítez; Referee: Omar Ponce

February 21 4	Barcelona	2 – 1	Fuerza Amarilla	Guayaquil
17:00 ECT (UTC-05:00)	Jonathan Álvez (yellow card) 19', (goal) 81'; Ismael Blanco 85', (yellow card) 86'; Richard Calderón (yellow card) 83'; Damian Díaz (yellow card) 86'; Gabriel Marques (yellow card) 90'	Report	Ángel Gracia (yellow card) 24' (yellow-red card) 34'; Koob Hurtado (yellow card) 38'; Wagner Valencia (yellow card) 45+1'; Luis Espinola 67'; Lauro Cazal (yellow card) 86'	Stadium: Monumental Banco Pichincha; Attendance: 41,586; Referee: Carlos Orbe

February 28 5	Universidad Católica	v	Barcelona	Quito
??:?? ECT (UTC-05:00)				Stadium: Olímpico Atahualpa

March 6 6	Barcelona	v	Aucas	Guayaquil
??:?? ECT (UTC-05:00)				Stadium: Monumental Banco Pichincha

March 13 7	Mushuc Runa	v	Barcelona	Ambato
??:?? ECT (UTC-05:00)				Stadium: Estadio Bellavista

March 18 8	Emelec	v	Barcelona	Guayaquil
??:?? ECT (UTC-05:00)				Stadium: Estadio George Capwell

March 27 9	Barcelona	v	Liga de Quito	Guayaquil
??:?? ECT (UTC-05:00)				Stadium: Monumental Banco Pichincha

April 3 10	Deportivo Cuenca	v	Barcelona	Cuenca
??:?? ECT (UTC-05:00)				Stadium: Alejandro Serrano Aguilar

April 10 11	Barcelona	v	Independiente del Valle	Guayaquil
??:?? ECT (UTC-05:00)				Stadium: Monumental Banco Pichincha

April 17 12	Independiente del Valle	v	Barcelona	Sangolquí
??:?? ECT (UTC-05:00)				Stadium: Estadio Rumiñahui

April 24 13	Barcelona	v	Deportivo Cuenca	Guayaquil
??:?? ECT (UTC-05:00)				Stadium: Monumental Banco Pichincha

May 1 14	Liga de Quito	v	Barcelona	Quito
??:?? ECT (UTC-05:00)				Stadium: La Casa Blanca

May 8 15	Barcelona	v	Emelec	Guayaquil
??:?? ECT (UTC-05:00)				Stadium: Monumental Banco Pichincha

May 15 16	Barcelona	v	Mushuc Runa	Guayaquil
??:?? ECT (UTC-05:00)				Stadium: Monumental Banco Pichincha

Juny 26 17	Aucas	v	Emelec	Quito
??:?? ECT (UTC-05:00)				Stadium: Gonzalo Pozo Ripalda

July 3 18	Barcelona	v	Universidad Católica	Guayaquil
??:?? ECT (UTC-05:00)				Stadium: Monumental Banco Pichincha

July 10 19	Fuerza Amarilla	v	Barcelona	Machala
??:?? ECT (UTC-05:00)				Stadium: Estadio 9 de Mayo

July 13 20	Barcelona	v	River Ecuador	Guayaquil
??:?? ECT (UTC-05:00)				Stadium: Monumental Banco Pichincha

July 17 21	Delfín	v	Barcelona	Manta
??:?? ECT (UTC-05:00)				Stadium: Estadio Jocay

July 24 20	Barcelona	v	El Nacional	Guayaquil
??:?? ECT (UTC-05:00)				Stadium: Monumental Banco Pichincha

==== Second stage ====
===== Stage table =====
Pos	Team	Pld	W	D	L	GF	GA	GD	Pts	Qualification
1	Barcelona	22	16	4	2	42	16	+26	52	Third stage and 2017 Copa Libertadores group stage
2	Emelec	22	14	3	5	44	25	+19	45	
3	Universidad Católica	22	8	7	7	29	33	−4	31	
4	Independiente del Valle	22	9	3	10	27	26	+1	30	
5	LDU Quito	22	8	6	8	21	30	−9	30	

==== Aggregate table ====
Pos	Team	Pld	W	D	L	GF	GA	GD	Pts	Qualification or relegation
1	Barcelona	44	31	6	7	93	35	+58	99	Copa Libertadores group stage
2	Emelec	44	27	7	10	81	48	+33	88	Copa Libertadores group stage
3	El Nacional	44	17	14	13	63	58	+5	65	Copa Libertadores second stage
4	Independiente del Valle	44	19	7	18	55	54	+1	64	Copa Libertadores first stage
5	LDU Quito	44	16	13	15	41	53	−12	61	Copa Sudamericana first stage

Updated to match(es) played on 10 December 2016. Source: Ecuafutbol

=== Copa Sudamericana ===
==== First stage ====
10 August 2016	Barcelona (Ecuador)	1–1	(Venezuela) Zamora	Guayaquil
21:15 UTC−5	Vera 53'	Report	Soteldo 81' (pen.)	Stadium: Estadio Monumental Isidro Romero Carbo; Referee: Óscar Rojas (Uruguay)

18 August 2016	Zamora (Venezuela)	1–1 (3–0 p)	(Ecuador) Barcelona	Barinas
18:00 UTC−4	Blanco 86'	Report	M. Caicedo 18'	Stadium: Estadio Agustín Tovar; Referee: Mauro Vigliano (Argentina)
	Penalties
	Blanco (penalty scored); Vargas (penalty scored); Soteldo (penalty scored)		(penalty missed) Oyola; (penalty missed) Velasco; (penalty missed) Esterilla
