= 2012 Campeonato Ecuatoriano de Fútbol Serie A =

Copa Credife Serie A
- Season: 2012
- Champions: Barcelona (14th title)
- Relegated: Olmedo; Técnico Universitario
- 2013 Copa Libertadores: Barcelona; Emelec; LDU Quito
- 2012 Copa Sudamericana: Barcelona; LDU Loja; Emelec
- 2013 Copa Sudamericana: Barcelona; Emelec; LDU Loja; Independiente José Terán
- Matches: 268
- Goals: 626 (2.34 per match)
- Top goalscorer: Narciso Mina (30 goals)
- Biggest home win: LDU Loja 6–0 Técnico Universitario (September 13)
- Biggest away win: Deportivo Quito 0–4 Macará (December 2)
- Highest scoring: Olmedo 4–4 Deportivo Quito (April 25)
- Longest winning run: Barcelona — 5 matches (May 6–June 13)
- Longest unbeaten run: LDU Quito — 9 matches (March 28–May 18); LDU Loja — 9 matches (November 3–December 15)
- Longest winless run: Olmedo — 12 matches (September 19–December 2)
- Longest losing run: Olmedo — 6 matches (April 29–June 13)

The 2012 Campeonato Ecuatoriano de Fútbol de la Serie A (known as the 2012 Copa Credife Serie A for sponsorship reasons) was the 54th season of the Serie A, Ecuador's premier football league. The season began on February 3 and ended in December 2012. Deportivo Quito was the defending champion. They were succeeded by Barcelona, who won their record-breaking 14th title.

== Format ==
On the night of December 6, 2011, the Ecuadorian Football Federation determined that the format for 2012 will the same as the previous season.

== Teams ==
Twelve teams competed in the 2012 Serie A season, ten of whom remained from the previous season. ESPOLI and Imbabura were relegated last season after accumulating the fewest points in the 2011 season aggregate table. They will be replaced by Técnico Universitario and Macará, the 2011 Serie B winner and runner-up, respectively. Both teams from Ambato are making returns to the Serie A. Macará is returning after one season while Técnico Universitario is returning after two.

Locations of the 2012 Serie A teams.

Team	Home city	Home ground	Manager	Captain
Barcelona	Guayaquil	Monumental Banco Pichincha	Gustavo Costas	(Ecuador) Matías Oyola
Deportivo Cuenca	Cuenca	Alejandro Serrano Aguilar	Guillermo Duró	(Paraguay) Miguel Paniagua
Deportivo Quito	Quito	Olímpico Atahualpa	Rubén Darío Insúa	(Ecuador) Luis Saritama
El Nacional	Quito	Olímpico Atahualpa		(Ecuador) Marwin Pita
Emelec	Guayaquil	George Capwell	Gustavo Quinteros	(Ecuador) Pedro Quiñónez
Independiente José Terán	Sangolquí	Rumiñahui	Pablo Repetto	(Ecuador) Daniel Samaniego
LDU Loja	Loja	Federativo Reina del Cisne	Paúl Vélez	(Ecuador) Pedro Larrea
LDU Quito	Quito	Casa Blanca	Edgardo Bauza	(Ecuador) Norberto Araujo
Macará	Ambato	Bellavista	Fabián Bustos	(Ecuador) Cristian Mora
Manta	Manta	Jocay	Armando Osma	(Ecuador) Bolívar Gómez
Olmedo	Riobamba	Olímpico de Riobamba	Roque Alfaro	(Ecuador) Carlos Caicedo
Técnico Universitario	Ambato	Bellavista	José Basualdo	(Ecuador) Christian Gómez

=== Managerial changes ===
Team	Outgoing manager	Manner of departure	Date of vacancy	Replaced by	Date of appointment	Position in table
Pre-season changes
Técnico Universitario	Paúl Vélez	Sacked (Note: The change in managers was announced in early November, but took effect at the end of the previous season.)	November 28, 2011	Fabián Bustos	November 28, 2011	N/A
LDU Loja	Diego Ochoa (Note: Interim manager.)	Replaced	December 4, 2011	Paúl Vélez	December 4, 2011	N/A
Olmedo	Dragan Miranovic	Mutual consent	December 6, 2011	Carlos Calderón	December 6, 2011	N/A
First Stage changes
Olmedo	Carlos Calderón	Resigned	February 12, 2012	Juan Amador Sánchez	February 13, 2012	12th
Barcelona	Luis Zubeldía	Resigned	April 9, 2012	Gustavo Costas	April 11, 2012	4th
El Nacional	Mario Saralegui	Mutual consent	April 9, 2012	Sixto Vizuete	April 10, 2012	8th
Técnico Universitario	Fabián Bustos	Mutual consent	April 13, 2012	Mario Saralegui	April 14, 2012	11th
Olmedo	Juan Amador Sánchez	Mutual consent	April 30, 2012	Óscar Pacheco	June 8, 2012	12th
Deportivo Quito	Carlos Ischia	Sacked	May 14, 2012	Nelson Acosta	May 24, 2012	7th
Técnico Universitario	Mario Saralegui	Resigned	June 18, 2012	José Basualdo	June 26, 2012	11th
Inter-stage changes
Emelec	Marcelo Fleitas	Resigned	July 8, 2012	Gustavo Quinteros	July 6, 2012	N/A
Macará	Homero Valencia	Mutual consent	July 8, 2012	Fabián Bustos	July 9, 2012	N/A
Second Stage changes
Deportivo Quito	Nelson Acosta	Resigned	July 30, 2012	Rubén Darío Insúa	July 31, 2012	12th
Independiente José Terán	Carlos Sevilla	Resigned	September 20, 2012	Pablo Repetto	September 24, 2012	11th
Olmedo	Óscar Pacheco	Resigned	October 1, 2012	Roque Alfaro	October 8, 2012	6th
Deportivo Cuenca	Luis Soler	Mutual consent	October 4, 2012	Guillermo Duró	October 26, 2012	9th
El Nacional	Sixto Vizuete	Sacked	November 8, 2012	Orlando Narváez	November 9, 2012	11th

== First stage ==
The first stage (Spanish: Primera Etapa) began on February 3 and ended on July 8.

=== Standings ===
Pos	Team	Pld	W	D	L	GF	GA	GD	Pts	Qualification
1	Barcelona	22	10	8	4	33	15	+18	38	2013 Copa Libertadores Second Stage, 2012 Copa Sudamericana First Stage and 2013 Copa Sudamericana First Stage
2	LDU Loja	22	10	8	4	25	18	+7	38	2012 Copa Sudamericana First Stage
3	Emelec	22	11	4	7	39	23	+16	37	2012 Copa Sudamericana First Stage
4	Independiente José Terán	22	10	7	5	29	20	+9	37	
5	Deportivo Cuenca	22	11	3	8	24	26	−2	36	
6	LDU Quito	22	8	10	4	32	22	+10	34	
7	Deportivo Quito	22	8	7	7	34	23	+11	31	
8	El Nacional	22	8	5	9	24	34	−10	29	
9	Manta	22	7	6	9	22	23	−1	27	
10	Macará	22	5	6	11	19	33	−14	21	
11	Técnico Universitario	22	4	6	12	18	32	−14	18	
12	Olmedo	22	4	2	16	14	44	−30	14	

=== Results ===
Home \ Away	BAR	CUE	QUI	NAC	EME	IJT	LDL	LDQ	MAC	MAN	OLM	TEC
Barcelona	—	3–1	0–0	1–2	1–1	1–1	0–0	1–1	4–1	4–0	4–0	3–0
Deportivo Cuenca	1–0	—	1–4	1–0	0–3	3–2	1–2	0–0	0–2	2–1	1–0	2–1
Deportivo Quito	3–0	1–3	—	3–0	2–1	0–1	4–1	1–1	3–0	1–2	2–0	0–0
El Nacional	0–2	1–2	2–1	—	2–1	1–2	1–3	1–1	3–1	1–1	2–1	0–0
Emelec	0–1	2–1	2–2	5–0	—	1–1	2–0	3–0	3–2	0–2	5–0	2–1
Independiente José Terán	0–2	1–2	0–0	3–0	2–1	—	1–0	2–2	1–0	0–2	3–0	4–1
LDU Loja	0–0	1–0	1–0	0–0	2–0	0–0	—	1–0	2–2	2–1	2–1	4–1
LDU Quito	2–2	1–2	0–0	3–2	2–0	1–1	2–2	—	3–0	2–0	5–0	2–1
Macará	1–0	0–0	1–0	1–2	0–2	0–2	1–1	0–2	—	1–1	3–1	2–0
Manta	0–1	0–0	1–2	1–1	0–0	3–0	1–0	0–1	1–1	—	3–1	1–0
Olmedo	0–2	1–0	4–4	0–1	0–2	0–0	0–1	2–0	2–0	1–0	—	0–3
Técnico Universitario	1–1	0–1	2–1	1–2	2–3	0–2	0–0	1–1	0–0	2–1	1–0	—

Updated to match(es) played on July 8, 2012. Source:
Legend: Blue = home team win; Yellow = draw; Red = away team win.

== Second stage ==
The second stage (Spanish: Segunda Etapa) began on July 13 and ended on December 2.

=== Standings ===
Pos	Team	Pld	W	D	L	GF	GA	GD	Pts	Qualification
1	Barcelona	22	13	6	3	42	19	+23	45	2013 Copa Libertadores Second Stage and 2013 Copa Sudamericana First Stage
2	Emelec	22	11	4	7	28	26	+2	37	
3	LDU Quito	22	9	8	5	26	20	+6	35	
4	Independiente José Terán	22	9	4	9	22	25	−3	31	
5	Técnico Universitario	22	8	7	7	27	34	−7	31	
6	Manta	22	8	6	8	27	22	+5	30	
7	Macará	22	9	2	11	27	29	−2	29	
8	LDU Loja	22	7	6	9	28	29	−1	27	
9	Deportivo Cuenca	22	7	6	9	20	23	−3	27	
10	Deportivo Quito	22	6	7	9	14	25	−11	25	
11	El Nacional	22	5	8	9	24	28	−4	23	
12	Olmedo	22	5	6	11	22	27	−5	21	

=== Results ===
Home \ Away	BAR	CUE	QUI	NAC	EME	IJT	LDL	LDQ	MAC	MAN	OLM	TEC
Barcelona	—	4–1	1–0	3–1	5–0	2–2	1–1	1–0	4–0	0–0	3–1	0–1
Deportivo Cuenca	1–2	—	0–0	1–0	1–0	2–1	2–0	3–1	0–0	1–1	1–1	1–3
Deportivo Quito	0–2	1–1	—	1–0	2–0	2–0	0–0	0–0	0–4	0–1	2–0	0–0
El Nacional	2–1	1–1	0–1	—	3–0	0–2	0–1	0–0	2–1	2–1	1–1	2–2
Emelec	1–2	1–0	3–0	2–1	—	2–1	3–1	2–2	3–0	1–0	1–0	2–1
Independiente José Terán	1–1	1–0	2–2	1–1	2–0	—	2–0	1–0	0–3	1–0	1–0	1–2
LDU Loja	0–1	1–0	0–1	2–2	2–2	2–1	—	1–2	2–1	1–2	2–1	6–0
LDU Quito	2–2	0–2	3–0	3–1	1–0	1–0	2–2	—	1–2	1–0	0–0	2–2
Macará	0–2	2–0	2–1	2–1	0–1	0–1	0–2	0–2	—	4–2	1–0	2–0
Manta	1–1	2–0	4–1	1–1	0–2	0–1	1–1	1–2	1–0	—	2–1	4–0
Olmedo	1–2	0–2	2–0	0–0	1–1	2–0	2–1	0–1	3–2	1–1	—	4–1
Técnico Universitario	3–2	1–0	0–0	1–3	1–1	3–0	3–0	0–0	1–1	0–2	2–1	—

Updated to match(es) played on December 2, 2012. Source:
Legend: Blue = home team win; Yellow = draw; Red = away team win.

== Aggregate table ==
Pos	Team	Pld	W	D	L	GF	GA	GD	Pts	Qualification or relegation
1	Barcelona	44	23	14	7	75	34	+41	83	2013 Copa Libertadores Second Stage and 2013 Copa Sudamericana First Stage
2	Emelec	44	22	8	14	67	49	+18	74	Second-Place Playoffs
3	LDU Quito	44	17	18	9	58	42	+16	69	Second-Place Playoffs
4	Independiente José Terán	44	19	11	14	51	45	+6	68	Fourth-Place Playoffs
5	LDU Loja	44	17	14	13	53	47	+6	65	Fourth-Place Playoffs
6	Deportivo Cuenca	44	18	9	17	44	49	−5	63	
7	Manta	44	15	12	17	49	45	+4	57	
8	Deportivo Quito	44	14	14	16	48	48	0	56	
9	El Nacional	44	13	13	18	48	62	−14	52	
10	Macará	44	14	8	22	46	62	−16	50	
11	Técnico Universitario	44	12	13	19	45	66	−21	49	Relegated to the Serie B
12	Olmedo	44	9	8	27	36	71	−35	35	Relegated to the Serie B

== Third stage ==
The Third Stage (Spanish: Tercera Etapa) began on December 9 and ended on December 16. It consisted of two playoffs.

=== Fourth-place playoffs ===
Independiente José Terán and LDU Loja played in the fourth-place playoff. By having the greater number of points in the aggregate table, Independiente José Terán will play the second leg at home.

Having won both matches, Independiente José Terán earned the Ecuador 3 berth in the 2013 Copa Sudamericana; LDU Loja earned the Ecuador 4 berth.

Pos	Team	Pld	W	D	L	GF	GA	GD	Pts	Qualification
1	LDU Loja	2	2	0	0	2	0	+2	6	2013 Copa Sudamericana First Stage
2	Independiente José Terán	2	0	0	2	0	2	−2	0	2013 Copa Sudamericana First Stage

December 8, 2012
19:00 UTC−05:00

LDU Loja	1–0	Independiente José Terán
Feraud 8'	Report

Estadio Federativo Reina del Cisne, Loja
Attendance: 707
Referee: Diego Lara

December 15, 2012
11:00 UTC−05:00

Independiente José Terán	0–1	LDU Loja
	Report	León 73'

Estadio Rumiñahui, Sangolquí
Attendance: 422
Referee: Miguel Hidalgo

=== Second-place playoffs ===
Emelec and LDU Quito played the second-place playoff. By having the greater number of points in the aggregate table, Emelec will play the second leg at home.

Having won both matches, Emelec won the Ecuador 2 berth for the 2013 Copa Libertadores and the 2013 Copa Sudamericana. LDU Quito earned the Ecuador 3 berth for the 2013 Copa Libertadores.

Pos	Team	Pld	W	D	L	GF	GA	GD	Pts	Qualification
1	Emelec	2	2	0	0	3	1	+2	6	2013 Copa Libertadores Second Stage and 2013 Copa Sudamericana First Stage
2	LDU Quito	2	0	0	2	1	3	−2	0	2013 Copa Libertadores First Stage

December 9, 2012
11:30 UTC−05:00

LDU Quito	1–2	Emelec
Vitti 45+1'	Report	de Jesús 31'; Mondaini 67'

Estadio Casa Blanca, Quito
Attendance: 14,466
Referee: Omar Ponce

December 16, 2012
17:00 UTC−05:00

Emelec	1–0	LDU Quito
de Jesús 78'	Report

Estadio George Capwell, Guayaquil
Attendance: 13,243
Referee: José Luis Espinel

=== Finals ===
Since Barcelona won both the first stage and second stage, the finals were not played, and Barcelona were crowned champions. They earned the Ecuador 1 berth in the 2013 Copa Libertadores and the Ecuador 1 berth in the 2013 Copa Sudamericana.

== Top goalscorers ==
Rank	Player	Nationality	Club	Goals
1	Narciso Mina	Ecuadorian	Barcelona	30
2	Claudio Bieler	Ecuadorian	LDU Quito	20
3	Fábio Renato	Brazilian	LDU Loja	16
4	Marlon de Jesús	Ecuadorian	Emelec	13
4	Carlos Luis Quintero	Ecuadorian	Macará	13
4	Enner Valencia	Ecuadorian	Emelec	13
7	Ariel Nahuelpan	Argentine	LDU Quito	11
7	Daniel Samaniego	Ecuadorian	Independiente José Terán	11
9	Byron Cano	Ecuadorian	Deportivo Cuenca	10
9	Alex Colón	Ecuadorian	Técnico Universitario	10
9	Luciano Figueroa	Argentine	Emelec	10
9	Marcos Mondaini	Argentine	Emelec	10

Updated as of games played on December 16, 2012.

=== Hat tricks ===
Player	For	Against	Result	Date
(Ecuador) Claudio Bieler	LDU Quito	Olmedo	5–0	February 12, 2012
(Ecuador) Alex Colón	Técnico Universitario	Olmedo	0–3	February 24, 2012
(Ecuador) Luis Caicedo	Barcelona	Olmedo	4–0	March 23, 2012
(Ecuador) Claudio Bieler	LDU Quito	El Nacional	3–2	March 31, 2012
(Brazil) Fábio Renato	LDU Loja	El Nacional	1–3	July 1, 2012
(Argentina) Marcos Mondaini	Emelec	Olmedo	5–0	July 8, 2012
(Ecuador) Narciso Mina^{4}	Barcelona	Macará	4–0	July 21, 2012
(Ecuador) Christian Márquez	Manta	Técnico Universitario	4–0	November 18, 2012
(Ecuador) Carlos Luis Quintero	Macará	Deportivo Quito	0–4	December 2, 2012

- ^{4} Player scored 4 goals.
