= Luis Caicedo =

Luis Caicedo may refer to:

- Luis Caicedo (footballer, born 1979), Ecuadorian football midfielder
- Luis Caicedo (footballer, born 1992), Ecuadorian football centre-back for L.D.U. Quito
- Luis Caicedo (footballer, born 1996), Colombian football midfielder for New England Revolution
