= Dennys Quiñónez =

Ecuadorian footballer (born 1992)

Dennys Quiñonez
Personal information
- Full name: Dennys Andres Quiñonez Espinoza
- Date of birth: 12 March 1992 (age 34)
- Place of birth: Guayaquil, Ecuador
- Height: 1.78 m (5 ft 10 in)
- Position: Centre midfielder

Team information
- Current team: Olmedo

Youth career
- 2004–2009: Barcelona

Senior career*
Years	Team	Apps	(Gls)
2010–2011	Barcelona	57	(0)
2012–2013	El Nacional	58	(1)
2014–2016	Deportivo Quito	11	(0)
2016–2017	Aucas	24	(0)
2017	LDU Portoviejo		
2018	Deportivo Cuenca	11	(0)
2019–	Olmedo	7	(0)

International career^{‡}
2010–	Ecuador U-20	20	(0)
2011–	Ecuador	3	(0)
- * Club domestic league appearances and goals as of 6 August 2018 ‡ National team caps and goals as of 28 June 2011

Dennys Quiñonez (born 12 March 1992) is an Ecuadorian footballer who plays as midfielder. He currently plays for Olmedo of the Ecuador Serie A.

== Club career ==
Quiñonez rose in the youth ranks of Barcelona and is considered a future prospect. Quiñonez has been a regular starter since the 2010 season along with others Barcelona's future prospect like Brayan de la Torre and Christian Cruz.

== International career ==
Quiñonez is a member and captain of the Ecuador Under-20 national team. On 12 February 2011 the Ecuador Under-20 qualify to the 2011 FIFA U-20 World Cup. Quiñonez got his first senior cap on 21 April 2011 against Argentina.
