= Miguel Ibarra (footballer, born 1984) =

Ecuadorian footballer

Personal information
- Full name: Washington Miguel Ibarra Tixe
- Date of birth: August 9, 1984 (age 42)
- Place of birth: New York City, United States
- Height: 1.75 m (5 ft 9 in)
- Position: Defender

Youth career
- 2000–2004: ESPOLI

Senior career*
Years	Team	Apps	(Gls)
2003–2009	ESPOLI	162	(6)
2010–2014	Universidad Católica	25	(2)
2011–2012	→ Barcelona (loan)	49	(0)
2013	→ Deportivo Quito (loan)	30	(0)
2014–2016	Aucas	67	(2)
2016–2017	Delfín	26	(0)

International career^{‡}
2009	Ecuador	4	(0)
- * Club domestic league appearances and goals as of 6 April 2017 ‡ National team caps and goals as of 16 May 2010

Washington Miguel Ibarra Tixe (born August 9, 1984, in New York City) is an Ecuadorian professional footballer. He formerly played for Barcelona and Quito-based club Universidad Católica.

== Club career ==
Ibarra began his career in the youth ranks of ESPOLI. In 2003, he made his debut with the senior side and was an important player for the club appearing in 162 league matches during his six seasons with the Quito side. In 2010, he signed with Universidad Católica and the attack minded right back made 25 league appearances and scored 2 goals with his new club.

For the 2011 season Ibarra was sent on loan to Ecuador's Barcelona Sporting Club. In 2012 his loan period was extended and he helped the club in capturing its 12th Serie A title. In 2013, he was sent on loan to Deportivo Quito where he made 30 league appearances. In January 2014 Ibarra went on trial with Major League Soccer side New York Red Bulls.

== International career ==
Ibarra was first called up for the Ecuador national team in 2009 for 2010 World Cup qualifiers against Brazil and Paraguay, but did not play. He earned his first cap for the national team starting against El Salvador on May 27, 2009.

== Honors ==
Barcelona

- Serie A (1): 2012

Aucas

- Serie B (1): 2014
