= Alan Sánchez (footballer, born 1985) =

Argentine footballer

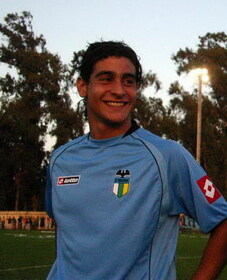
- Sánchez with O'Higgins in 2007

Personal information
- Full name: Alan Sánchez
- Date of birth: 23 November 1985 (age 40)
- Place of birth: Buenos Aires, Argentina
- Height: 1.77 m (5 ft 10 in)
- Position: Midfielder

Team information
- Current team: Estudiantes (assistant)

Senior career*
Years	Team	Apps	(Gls)
2004–2006	Platense	40	(7)
2007	O'Higgins	17	(2)
2007–2010	Huracán	41	(3)
2010–2011	Boca Unidos	34	(1)
2011–2012	Levadiakos	6	(0)
2012–2013	Manta	27	(6)
2013	Platense	10	(1)
2013–2014	Macará	16	(1)
2014	Juventud Antoniana	10	(0)
2015	Racing de Olavarría	9	(0)
2015	Manta	31	(3)
2016	Gutiérrez	5	(0)
2017–2019	Acassuso	64	(3)
2020	Guillermo Brown	0	(0)
2021–2022	Chicago de Bariloche	1	(1)
Total		311	(27)

Managerial career
- 2024–: Estudiantes (assistant)
- * Club domestic league appearances and goals

Alan Sánchez (born November 23, 1985) is a former Argentine footballer who played as a midfielder.

== Coaching career ==
In 2024, Sánchez joined the technical staff of Estudiantes de La Plata as an assistant coach.

== Personal life ==
He is the son of the Argentine coach Juan Amador Sánchez.
