= Edgar Balbuena =

Paraguayan footballer (born 1980)

Personal information
- Full name: Edgar Gabriel Balbuena Adorno
- Date of birth: 20 November 1980 (age 45)
- Place of birth: Capiatá, Paraguay
- Height: 1.80 m (5 ft 11 in)
- Position: Defender

Team information
- Current team: Juan Aurich
- Number: 3

Senior career*
Years	Team	Apps	(Gls)
1998	Tacuary		
1999–2002	Cerro Porteño		
2002	Tacuary		
2003	Estudiantes	12	(0)
2004–2005	Olimpia		
2005–2009	Libertad		
2009–2010	Corinthians	11	(0)
2010–2011	Juan Aurich	42	(3)
2012–2013	Independiente José Terán	52	(2)
2013–	Juan Aurich	77	(13)
- * Club domestic league appearances and goals

Edgar Gabriel Balbuena Adorno or, simply, Edgar Balbuena (born 20 November 1980 in Capiatá) is a Paraguayan footballer. He currently plays for Juan Aurich in the Peruvian Primera Division.
