= Michael Quiñónez =

Ecuadorian footballer (born 1984)

Personal information
- Full name: Michael Jackson Quiñónez Cabeza
- Date of birth: June 21, 1984 (age 42)
- Place of birth: Guayaquil, Guayas, Ecuador
- Height: 1.78 m (5 ft 10 in)
- Position: Attacking midfielder

Team information
- Current team: L.D.U. Portoviejo

Senior career*
Years	Team	Apps	(Gls)
2000	Club Social Deportivo Talleres	69	(1)
2001–2007	ESPOLI	69	(10)
2003	→ Deportivo Quevedo (loan)	69	(0)
2008	Santos	69	(2)
2009–2010	El Nacional	61	(10)
2010–2011	Deportivo Quito	23	(2)
2012–2014	Barcelona	75	(3)
2015–2016	LDU Quito	29	(3)
2016–2017	Mushuc Runa	28	(2)
2017	Aucas	7	(2)
2018–	LDU Portoviejo	1	(0)

International career
2009–2011	Ecuador	5	(1)
- * Club domestic league appearances and goals as of July 16, 2017

Michael Jackson Quiñónez Cabeza (born June 21, 1984 in Guayaquil, Guayas), is an Ecuadorian football attacking midfielder who plays for L.D.U. Portoviejo.

== Club career ==
Quiñónez played for Ecuadorian clubs Quevedo and Espoli before moving to Santos. Santos signed him in February 2008, along with Colombian Mauricio Molina. He made his debut on February 13, 2008, starting against Cúcuta Deportivo of Colombia in the 2008 Copa Libertadores. Michael Quiñónez scored his first goal for Santos on April 1, 2008, when his club beat Bolivian club San José 7–0 for the Copa Libertadores.

On January 6, 2009, he signed for 13-time Ecuadorian champions El Nacional.

== International career ==
Despite his attention-gaining move to Brazilian football in 2008, Quiñonez was not noticed by national team coach Sixto Vizuete until March 2009, when he was called up for a friendly game against El Salvador. He made his debut as a left-side midfielder in the 3–1 loss to El Salvador. His prolific performances with El Nacional, however, have earned him another chance with the Ecuador national team, and he was called up to the squad to replace injured forward Carlos Tenorio for the extremely important last two 2010 FIFA World Cup qualifying fixtures against Uruguay and Chile.

== Honours ==
Deportivo Quito

- Ecuadorian Serie A: 2011

Barcelona

- Ecuadorian Serie A: 2012
