= Luis Checa =

Ecuadorian footballer (born 1983)

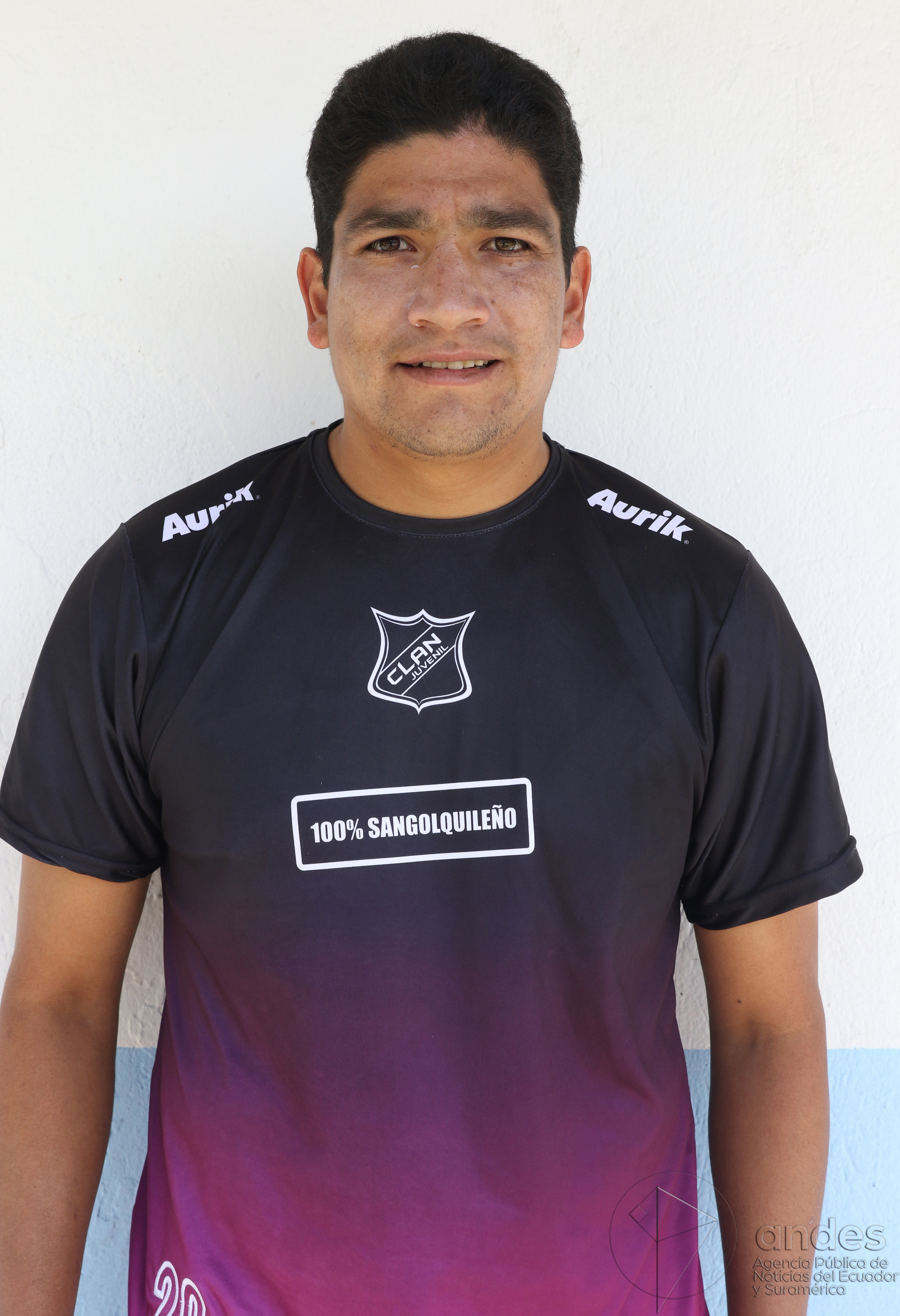

Personal information
- Full name: Luis Armando Checa Villamar
- Date of birth: December 21, 1983 (age 42)
- Place of birth: Ecuador
- Height: 1.82 m (6 ft 0 in)
- Position: Center back

Team information
- Current team: Clan Juvenil

Senior career*
Years	Team	Apps	(Gls)
2001–2005	El Nacional	104	(4)
2006	Deportivo Quito	44	(3)
2007	→ El Nacional (loan)	3	(0)
2007	→ Aucas (loan)	18	(0)
2008–2013	Deportivo Quito	223	(14)
2014–2017	Barcelona	64	(4)
2017–2018	Clan Juvenil	0	(0)

International career^{‡}
2008–2013	Ecuador	8	(0)
- * Club domestic league appearances and goals as of 6 August 2014 ‡ National team caps and goals as of 24 December 2010

Luis Armando Checa Villamar (born December 21, 1983) is an Ecuadorian retired footballer who last time played with CD Clan Juvenil.

== Club career ==
Luis started out at Deportivo Quito where he had a first good season. He had 27 appearances to start out with and attracted last season's champions El Nacional.

In 2007, Luis was awarded a move to Nacional by his impressive defending performances. However, he only had two appearances and former Nacional coach, Ever Hugo Almeida, was not interested in keeping him with the Quito giants. He finished the year playing on loan for Aucas. In 2008, he went back to Deportivo Quito and is still there currently. In December 2008, he helped Deportivo Quito win their third title in history.

=== Copa Sudamericana 2008 ===
Luis helped Dep. Quito qualify for the Copa Sudamericana 2008. He made four appearances and was an important player for Sevilla's team. His team went on to eliminate Universitario de Deportes of Peru in a 2–1 aggregate win. Deportivo Quito then had to play Mexico's San Luis. Unfortunately, Deportivo Quito was eliminated from the tournament in a 5-4 aggregate loss. He scored one of the goals for Deportivo Quito.

== International career ==
Luis has been called up to a friendly against Mexico on November 12, 2008. He is expected to be in the starting line-up for Ecuador. He was recently called up to play a quadrangular friendly tournament in Oman.
