= Brayan de la Torre =

Ecuadorian footballer (born 1991)

Personal information
- Full name: Brayan José de la Torre Martínez
- Date of birth: January 11, 1991 (age 35)
- Place of birth: Guayaquil, Ecuador
- Position: Midfielder

Team information
- Current team: LDU Portoviejo
- Number: 22

Youth career
- 2007 – 2011: Barcelona

Senior career*
Years	Team	Apps	(Gls)
2009–2015	Barcelona	92	(3)
2015–2016	Dorados	3	(0)
2017–2018	Guayaquil City	21	(0)
2018	Técnico Universitario	7	(0)
2018	CD Santa Rita	?	(1)
2019	Fuerza Amarilla	9	(0)
2020–	LDU Portoviejo	1	(0)

International career
2011	Ecuador	1	(0)
- * Club domestic league appearances and goals as of 19:28, 28 May 2020 (UTC)

Brayan José de la Torre Martínez (born January 11, 1991) is an Ecuadorian football midfielder currently playing for L.D.U. Portoviejo in the Ecuadorian Serie A.

== Club career ==
=== Barcelona SC ===
==== 2009-2011 ====
De la Torre rose in the youth ranks of Barcelona and is considered a future prospect. In 2009, De la Trorre had the opportunity to play a match with head coach Benito Floro. In 2010 season, he had the opportunity to play in 6 matches, scoring his first goal in the senior team on a 3–0 home victory against Independiente José Terán. De la Torre has been a regular starter since the 2010 season along with others Barcelona's future prospect like Dennys Quiñónez and Christian Cruz. In the 2011 season, De la Torre's career took a huge step, with the support of then Argentine coach Ruben Dario Insua, gave him more continuity as a starter in the senior team. On April 2, Álex Aguinaga was debuting as the new head coach of Barcelona, he made Brayan played 90 minutes and he scored the winning goal against Independiente José Terán in Sangolquí.

==== 2012 Season ====
On November 28, De La Torre became 2012 Serie A champion with Barcelona SC, after nearly 14 years since Barcelona have won their last league title.

== International career ==
De la Torre is a member of the Ecuador Under-20 national team. On February 12, 2011, the Ecuador Under-20 qualify to the 2011 FIFA U-20 World Cup. On September 6, 2011, De La Torre debuted on the Ecuador national team as a substitute against Costa Rica. Ecuador won the game 4–0.

== Honors ==
=== Club ===
Barcelona SC

- Serie A (1): 2012
