= Marcos Mondaini =

Argentine footballer (born 1985)

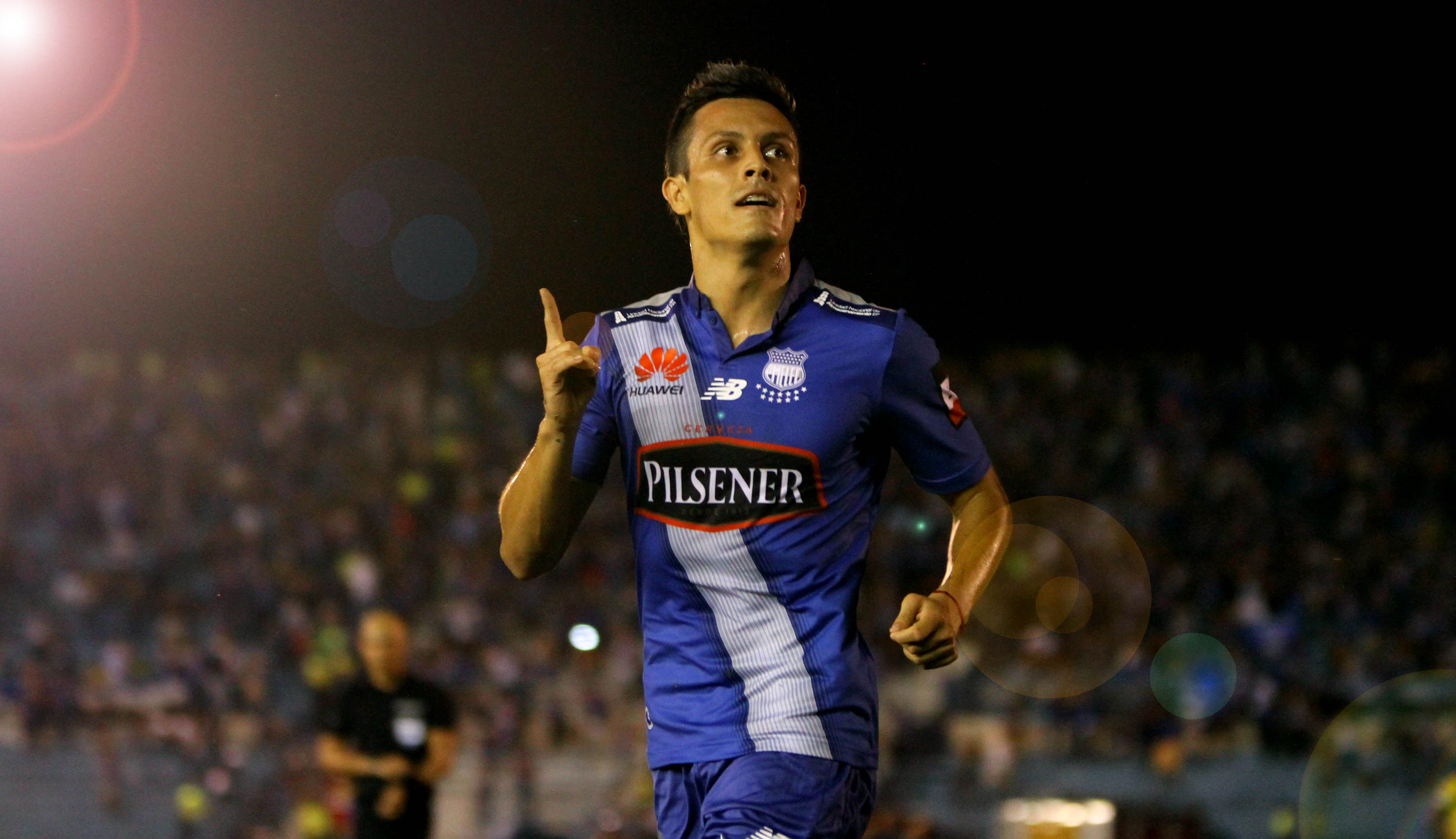
- Mondaini with Emelec, 2015

Personal information
- Full name: Marcos Gustavo Mondaini
- Date of birth: 14 February 1985 (age 41)
- Place of birth: Sáenz Peña, Argentina
- Height: 1.73 m (5 ft 8 in)
- Positions: Winger; attacking midfielder; striker

Team information
- Current team: Rocafuerte

Youth career
- 2002–2004: Boca Juniors

Senior career*
Years	Team	Apps	(Gls)
2004–2010	Boca Juniors	6	(0)
2006–2007	→ Emelec (loan)	41	(12)
2008	→ Barcelona SC (loan)	21	(3)
2009	→ Nacional (loan)	11	(3)
2010	→ Atlético Nacional (loan)	26	(4)
2011	Fénix	0	(0)
2011	→ Chivas USA (loan)	24	(3)
2012–2019	Emelec	227	(37)
2019–2020	Guayaquil City	11	(0)
2020	Rocafuerte	2	(0)
- * Club domestic league appearances and goals

Marcos Gustavo Mondaini (born 14 February 1985) is an Argentine former professional footballer who played as a striker.

== Career ==
=== South America ===
Mondaini began his career in the youth ranks of top Argentine side Boca Juniors, debuting with the first team during the 2004 Apertura season. While with Boca, Mondaini appeared in six league matches.

Mondaini spent the 2006–07 season on loan with Ecuadorian club Emelec. During his one season with Emelec he appeared in 41 matches and scored 12 goals. After the season, he was recognized as the top player in Ecuador's Serie A for 2006. In 2008, he returned to Ecuador to play for Emelec's arch-rival, Barcelona SC. While with Barcelona SC he appeared in 21 matches and scored 3 goals. After returning briefly to Boca, Mondaini was loaned out to Uruguay's Nacional. While with Nacional he helped the club in capturing the 2008–09 league title. He also participated in the 2009 Copa Libertadores for Nacional appearing in seven matches and scoring two goals as the club reached the semi-final stage.

In 2010, he joined Colombia's Atlético Nacional. On 31 July 2010, "The devil", in his debut, scored his first goal for Atlético Nacional in a 3–1 defeat against Deportivo Cali in the third round of the Torneo Finalización of Colombia.

=== United States ===
Mondaini was loaned from Centro Atlético Fénix of the Uruguayan Primera División to C.D. Chivas USA of Major League Soccer on 1 March 2011. He scored his first goal for his new club on 30 April in a 3–0 win over New England Revolution.

On 7 May 2011 he made a tackle from behind with no chance of getting the ball on Real Salt Lake's Javier Morales, sending him off the field with a dislocated ankle and two broken bones. Morales was out for several months. Mondaini received a suspension of four games: 3 games for the tackle plus 1 game for the red card.

After one season in MLS, Mondaini signed with his former Ecuadorian club Emelec in January 2012.

== Career statistics ==
As of March 20, 2015

Club	Season	League		Cup		Continental		Total	
Club	Season	Apps	Goals	Apps	Goals	Apps	Goals	Apps	Goals
Boca Juniors	2004-05	2	0	0	0	0	0	2	0
Boca Juniors	2005 Apertura	0	0	0	0	0	0	0	0
Boca Juniors	Total	2	0	0	0	0	0	2	0
Emelec	2006	41	12	–		0	0	41	12
Emelec	Total	41	12	–		0	0	41	12
Boca Juniors	2007 Clausura	3	0	0	0	1	0	4	0
Boca Juniors	2007 Apertura	0	0	0	0	0	0	0	0
Boca Juniors	Total	3	0	0	0	1	0	4	0
Barcelona SC	2008	21	3	–		0	0	21	3
Barcelona SC	Total	21	3	–		0	0	21	3
Nacional	2009 Clausura	11	3	–		7	2	18	5
Nacional	Total	11	3	–		7	2	18	5
Boca Juniors	2009 Apertura	1	0	0	0	0	0	1	0
Boca Juniors	Total	1	0	0	0	0	0	1	0
Atlético Nacional	2010	38	4	0	0	0	0	38	4
Atlético Nacional	Total	38	4	0	0	0	0	38	4
Fénix	2011 Clausura	0	0	–		0	0	0	0
Chivas USA	2011	24	3	0	0	0	0	24	3
Chivas USA	Total	24	3	0	0	0	0	24	3
Emelec	2012	37	10	–		13	1	50	11
Emelec	2013	41	7	–		12	0	53	7
Emelec	2014	32	6	–		8	1	40	7
Emelec	2015	29	7	–		9	0	38	7
Emelec	Total	139	30	–		42	2	169	32
Career total		270	55	0	0	50	4	329	59

== Honours ==
=== Club ===
Boca Juniors

- Copa Libertadores (1): 2007

Emelec

- Serie A Runner-up (2): 2006, 2012
- Serie A (2): 2013, 2014

=== Individual ===
Emelec

- Serie A Assist Leader (2): 2006, 2012
- Serie A Best Foreign Player: 2006
- Serie A Best Player: 2006
