= Flavio Caicedo =

Ecuadorian footballer (born 1988)

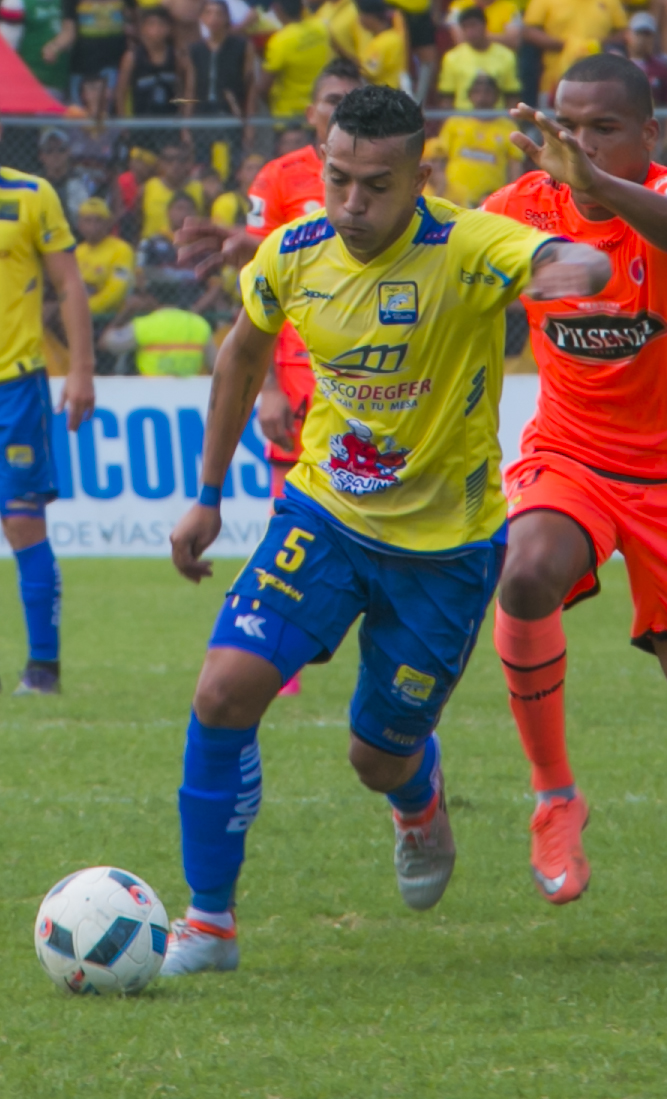

Personal information
- Full name: Flavio David Caicedo Gracia
- Date of birth: 29 February 1988 (age 38)
- Position: Midfielder

Team information
- Current team: River Ecuador

Senior career*
Years	Team	Apps	(Gls)
2006	Manta		
2007–2013	El Nacional	153	(2)
2014–2017	Barcelona	38	(1)
2016–2017	→ Delfín (loan)	33	(0)
2017–	River Ecuador	0	(0)

International career^{‡}
2011–	Ecuador	2	(0)
- * Club domestic league appearances and goals as of 21 September 2011 ‡ National team caps and goals as of 21 September 2011

Flavio David Caicedo Gracia (born 29 February 1988) is an Ecuadorian international footballer who plays for River Ecuador, as a midfielder.

== Career ==
Caicedo has played for El Nacional since 2007.

He made his international debut for Ecuador in 2011.
