= Luis Caicedo (footballer, born 1979) =

Ecuadorian footballer

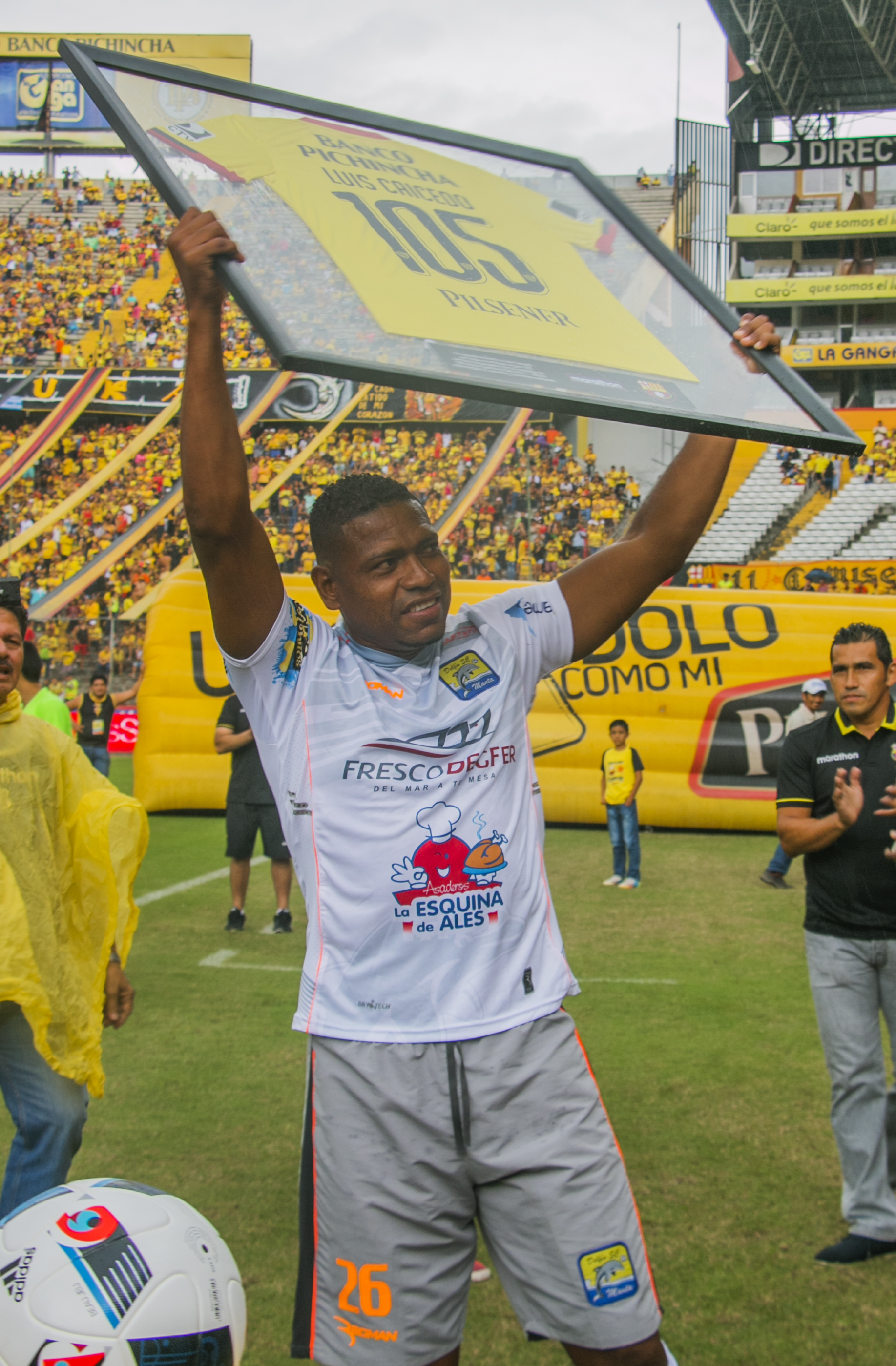

Personal information
- Full name: Luis Andrés Caicedo de la Cruz
- Date of birth: 12 May 1979 (age 47)
- Place of birth: Esmeraldas, Esmeraldas, Ecuador
- Position: Midfielder

Youth career
- 1997–1998: Olimpico
- 1998: → Olmedo (loan)

Senior career*
Years	Team	Apps	(Gls)
1999–2000	Universidad Católica	16	(0)
2000–2009	Olmedo	290	(22)
2010	Macará	36	(4)
2011–2015	Barcelona	99	(12)
2015–2016	LDU Portoviejo	20	(4)
2016	Delfín	5	(1)
2016–2017	Olmedo	15	(1)

International career
2007	Ecuador	16	(0)
- * Club domestic league appearances and goals

Luis Andrés Caicedo de la Cruz (born May 12, 1979) is an Ecuadorian retired footballer.

== Club career ==
Caicedo began his career in Olimpico. However, he only played there for a year and was loaned out to Olmedo. His great skill for center midfield soon impressed Ecuadorian teams when he played for Olmedo on loan for a year.

In April 1999, Caicedo joined Universidad Católica signing for a year. He was soon attracting Olmedo for his good play.

In February 2000, Caicedo signed with Olmedo permanently. He was soon able to consolidate himself as first choice center midfielder for the team. Caicedo scored many goals for Olmedo which made him one of the most important players Olmedo had along with José Luis Perlaza and Omar Ledesma. He is currently the team's top scorer with 7 goals in the Ecuadorian Serie A 2009.

== International career ==
Caicedo was called up by former coach Luis Fernando Suárez to play in the Copa América 2007 for Ecuador in summer 2007. During a training session, he got injured and could not play the tournament. He was replaced by Pedro Quiñónez for the tournament. He also played in the 3–1 friendly match loss to the United States.
