= Pablo Saucedo =

Argentine-born Ecuadorian footballer (born 1982)

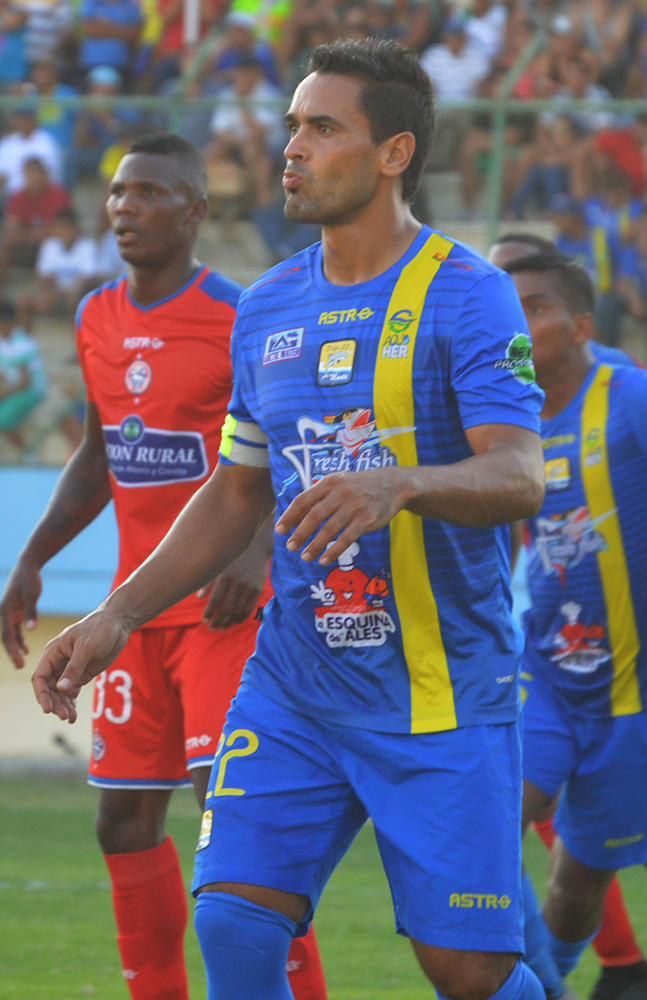

Personal information
- Full name: Pablo Andrés Saucedo
- Date of birth: March 6, 1982 (age 44)
- Place of birth: Moreno, Buenos Aires, Argentina
- Position: Defender

Team information
- Current team: Portoviejo

Senior career*
Years	Team	Apps	(Gls)
2002–2008	Ferro Carril Oeste		
2004	→ São José-PA (loan)		
2004–2005	→ Brown de Adrogué (loan)	20	(1)
2008–2010	Manta FC	46	(3)
2011–2015	Barcelona SC	96	(7)
2015–2017	Delfín	76	(5)
2017–	Portoviejo	0	(0)
- * Club domestic league appearances and goals

Pablo Andrés Saucedo (born March 6, 1982, in Moreno, Buenos Aires) is an Argentine-born Ecuadorian football central defender who plays for Portoviejo.
