= Juan Amador Sánchez =

Argentinian footballer

Personal information
- Date of birth: 26 January 1961 (age 65)
- Place of birth: Totoras, Argentina
- Height: 1.73 m (5 ft 8 in)
- Position: Defender

Senior career*
Years	Team	Apps	(Gls)
1981–1986	Huracán	112	(2)
1986	Boca Juniors	14	(0)
1986–1990	Platense	110	(1)
1990–1992	River Plate	37	(1)
1992–1993	Atlético de Rafaela	34	(0)
1993–1994	Unión	39	(0)
1995–1996	San Martín de Tucumán	14	(1)
1996	Atlético Tucumán	16	(0)
1996–1997	Nueva Chicago	20	(0)
1997–1998	Deportivo Morón	9	(0)
Total		405	(5)

Managerial career
- 2001: San Telmo
- 2003: Haiti
- 2003–2005: Almagro
- 2005: Guaraní
- 2005–2006: Universitario
- 2006: Platense
- 2006–2007: Aucas
- 2007–2008: Atlético de Rafaela
- 2008: Almagro
- 2008–2009: Talleres
- 2010–2011: Boca Unidos
- 2011: Huracán
- 2012: Olmedo
- 2012: Defensores de Belgrano
- 2013–2014: San Martín de Tucumán
- 2014: Chaco For Ever
- 2015: Manta
- 2017: Platense (interim)
- * Club domestic league appearances and goals

Juan Amador Sánchez (born 26 January 1961) is an Argentine football player and manager. A defender, he played for ten clubs during his career, all in his native Argentina.

== Managerial career ==
Sánchez started his managerial career with Club Atlético San Telmo. In 2003, he was appointed head coach of the Haiti national football team, a position he held until 2003. After that, he coached Club Almagro, Club Guaraní, Club Universitario de Deportes, Club Atlético Platense, S.D. Aucas, Atlético de Rafaela, Talleres de Córdoba, Boca Unidos, Club Atlético Huracán, C.D. Olmedo, Defensores de Belgrano, San Martín de Tucumán, Chaco For Ever, and Manta.
