= Alex Colón =

Ecuadorian footballer (born 1986)

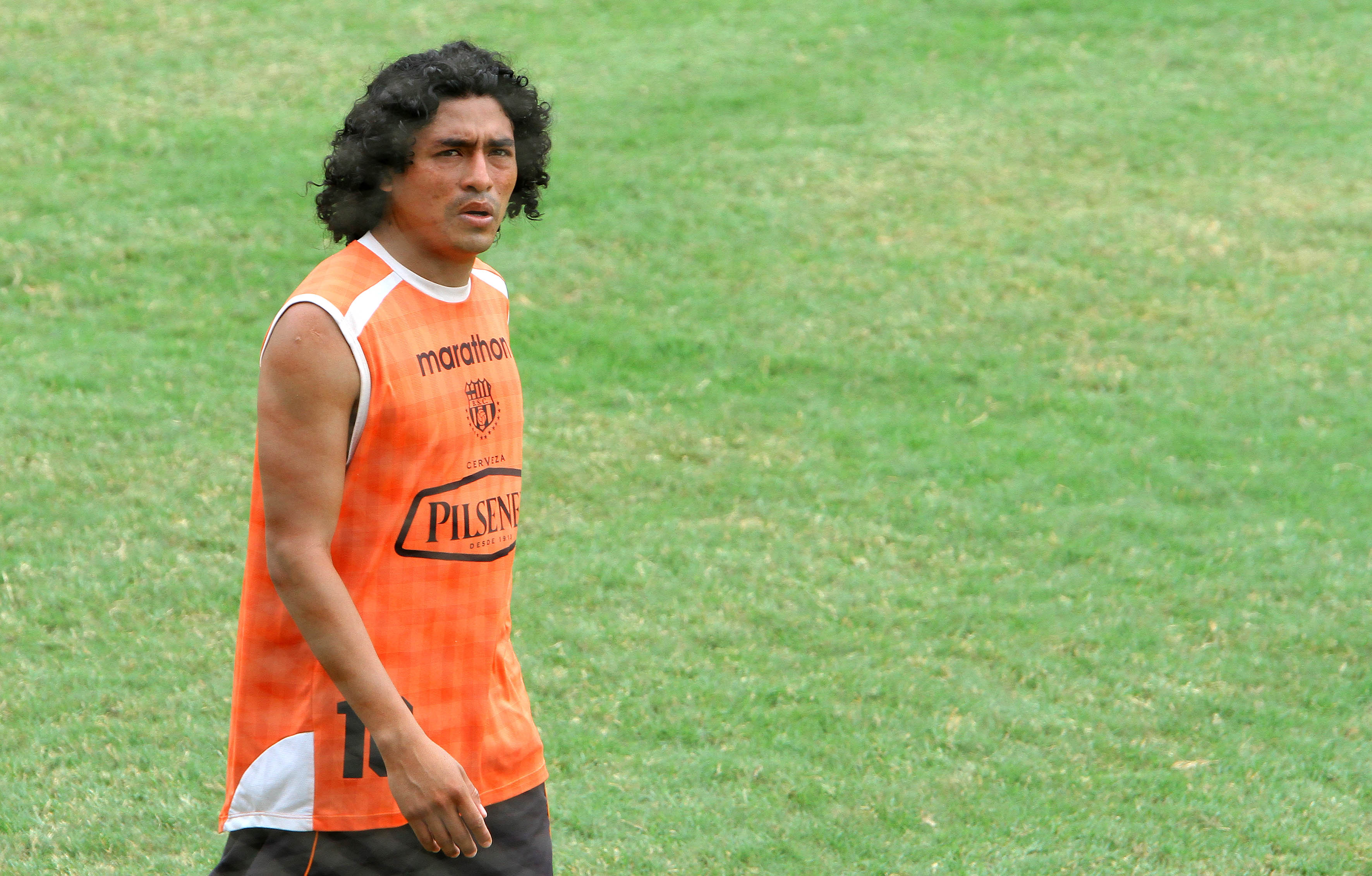

Personal information
- Full name: Alex Patricio Colón Rueda
- Date of birth: November 17, 1986 (age 39)
- Place of birth: Quito, Pichincha, Ecuador
- Height: 1.75 m (5 ft 9 in)
- Position: Attacking midfielder

Team information
- Current team: Club La Union

Youth career
- 2002–2005: LDU Quito

Senior career*
Years	Team	Apps	(Gls)
2010	UT Cotopaxi	40	(16)
2011–2012	Técnico Universitario	79	(21)
2013	Deportivo Quito	39	(12)
2014–2016	Pachuca	15	(0)
2014	→ Zacatecas (loan)	13	(1)
2015	→ Barcelona (loan)	25	(2)
2016	→ Delfín (loan)	9	(0)
2016	→ ESPOLI (loan)		(2)
2017–	Club La Union		
- * Club domestic league appearances and goals as of 24 October 2017

Alex Patricio Colón Rueda (born 17 November 1986 in Quito) is an Ecuadorian professional footballer currently playing for CD La Union in Ecuador.

== Career ==
=== Técnico Universitario ===
==== 2010–2012 ====
Alex's first goal of the 2011 season came on March 20, in a 2–1 home win over River Plate. He later scored 2 goals in the month of April against Deportivo Quevedo and against LDU Portoviejo. Alex would go on to score 2 more goals in the month of May, against Universidad Catolica and LDU Portoviejo once again. He scored 3 goals in July, against Audaz, Grecia and Macara. His final 3 goals of the 2011 Serie B season were against UT Cotopaxi, Valle del Chota and River Plate, the first team he scored against in the current season. He finished his 2011 Serie B season scoring 11 goals.

Alex began his goal-scoring tally for the 2012 Serie A season with amazing fashion, scoring a 3-goal hat-trick against Olmedo in a 3–0 away win. On March 11, he scored the equalizer against his old club and Ecuadorian giants, LDU Quito in a 1–1 home draw. On March 28, Alex scored the winner against Macara, in a 2–1 home win. On May 22, he scored against Ecuadorian giants Emelec, but lost 2–3. He also scored against El Nacional on July 7, but lost 1–2 at home turf. On August 19, he scored the winning goal against Ecuadorian giants and most popular team of the country, Barcelona SC, in a 1–0 away win. On September 30, he scored against LDU Loja, in a 3–0 home win. His final goal of the season came on October 28, once again defeating Barcelona SC 3–2, at home. He ended his 2012 season with impressive displays of football, and scored 10 goals all season. Deportivo Quito and Emelec went on to battle against each other for his transfer, Deportivo Quito being the winner of his transfer.

=== Deportivo Quito ===
==== 2013 ====
Alex Colón signed on for Deportivo Quito, and was given the number 10 shirt. He began the 2013 Serie A season scoring a volleyed long range goal against Deportivo Quevedo, winning 4–1 at home. On February 23, he scored a chip goal against Maximo Banguera, Barcelona's star goalkeeper, winning 1–0 at home. On March 13 Colón scored against Deportivo Cuenca, drawing away a 2–2 score-line. On April 14, he scored another long-range chipped goal against Emelec, winning 3–0 at home. On April 28, he in a 3–0 home win over Manta. On May 4, he scored yet again for the 4th time of the season a well-finished chipped goal against LDU Quito, winning 3–1 away against their city rivals. On 8 May 2013, Colón scored 2 defining goals in a 5–1 win over Deportivo Cuenca, the first one a perfectly placed finish from outside the box, and the second was his brilliance, scoring from the middle of the field, and accurately placed inside the corner of the goal. On June 12, Alex scored a goal in a 2–1 home win over Deportivo Quevedo. On November Alex goes back to his goal-scoring ways, scoring goals against Macara, El Nacional and Independiente del Valle, winning both and drawing on the latter.

=== Pachuca ===
After numerous rumors of Pachuca interest in the midfielder, both parties came to terms and agreed on a transfer.

On January 25, 2014, Colón scored his 1st goal for Pachuca in a 3–1 away win against Club León.

==== Loan to Mineros Zacatecas ====
It was confirmed that Colón would play for Ascenso MX side Mineros de Zacatecas on loan from Pachuca.

== International career ==
Due to Alex Colón's outstanding 2013 season, Ecuador National Team coach Reinaldo Rueda called him up for the 2014 World Cup Qualifier matches against Peru and Argentina.

He made his unofficial debut in a friendly against LDU Quito in a 5–0 thrashing. Colón scored 2 goals coming in as a Sub.

== Honors ==
=== Club ===
Tecnico Universitario

- Ecuadorian Serie B: 2011
