= Narciso Mina =

Ecuadorian football striker (born 1982)

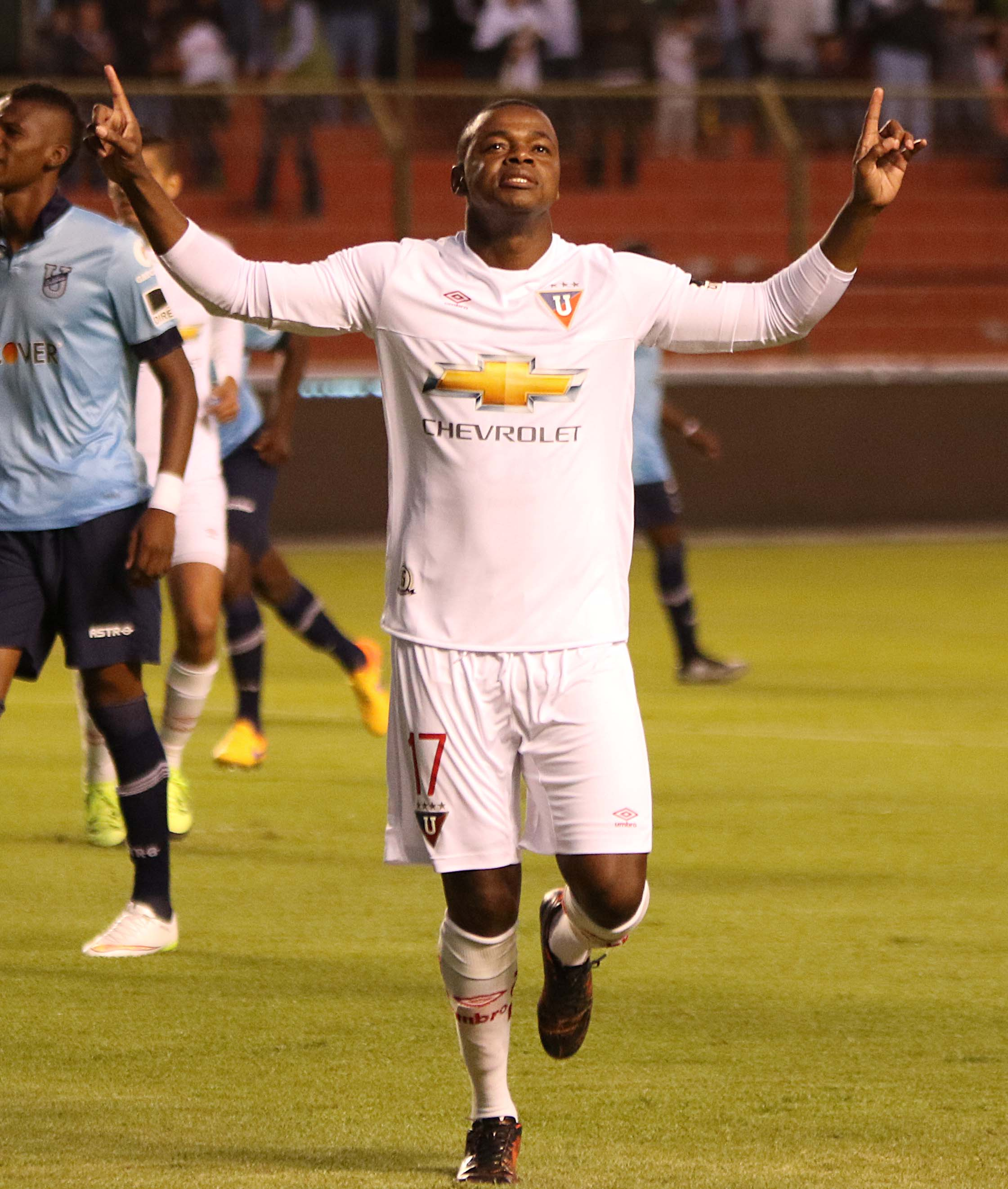

Personal information
- Full name: Narciso Mina Villalba
- Date of birth: 25 November 1982 (age 43)
- Place of birth: San Lorenzo, Ecuador
- Height: 1.72 m (5 ft 7 1/2 in)
- Position: Striker

Team information
- Current team: Clan Juvenil
- Number: 18

Youth career
- 2000–2002: Deportivo Cuenca

Senior career*
Years	Team	Apps	(Gls)
2002–2005	Deportivo Cuenca	34	(4)
2004	→ LDU Cuenca (loan)	19	(26)
2006–2007	LDU Loja	58	(14)
2008	Deportivo Azogues	1	(0)
2008	Manta	38	(25)
2009	Barcelona SC	27	(6)
2010	→ Chornomorets Odesa (loan)	11	(0)
2010	Manta	21	(1)
2011	Independiente	37	(28)
2012	Barcelona SC	43	(30)
2013	América	27	(5)
2014–2016	Atlante	18	(4)
2015–2016	→ LDU Quito (loan)	33	(14)
2016	San Martín de San Juan	0	(0)
2016	Mushuc Runa Sporting Club	12	(2)
2017–	Clan Juvenil	25	(2)

International career
2008–2013	Ecuador	11	(1)
- * Club domestic league appearances and goals as of August 25, 2017

Arrinton Narciso Mina Villalba (born 25 November 1982 in San Lorenzo) is an Ecuadorian football striker who plays for Clan Juvenil.

== Club career ==
He was transferred to Barcelona from former club Manta Fútbol Club and was a regular starter for his club. On 27 October 2009 Huracán signed Mina on loan from Barcelona Guayaquil for one year.

In March joined Chornomorets Odesa in the Ukrainian Premier League on a 3-month loan until the end of the season with an option to prolong his contract based on his performances.

=== Barcelona SC ===
==== 2012 season ====
In 2012, Mina rejoined Barcelona. Mina scored his first two goals in a game against Deportivo Cuenca. He finished the 2012 Ecuadorian Serie A season as top goal-scorer, with thirty goals to his name, the second highest global tally by a South American. His thirty goals was the most scored by a Barcelona player in a single season, which helped Barcelona secure its fourteenth title, not having won a league title since 1997.

=== América ===
==== 2012–13 season ====
On 3 December 2012 Narciso Mina was signed by Mexican club América. He finished the Clausura 2013 scoring one goal against Atlante. He was the top scorer in the Copa MX tournament with eight goals.

==== 2013–14 season ====
Mina scored his first league goal on 3 August in a 3–0 win against Atlas at the Estadio Azteca. He dedicated the goal to former América teammate and national team striker Christian Benítez, who died on 29 July. On 10 August he scored his second goal in three games played against Atlante in a 4–2 win in Cancún. Mina finished the Apertura tournament with five goals, though in his final match against Club León, which was also the league final, he was subbed off after a bad performance in which he missed four goal scoring opportunities. He was booed off the field and replaced by Luis Gabriel Rey.

=== Atlante ===
On 18 December 2013 Mina was sold to Atlante.

=== LDU Quito ===
His first game with Liga Deportiva Universitaria de Quito was against El Nacional, which was the opening game for LDU Quito of the 2015 season, he scored the first goal

== Career statistics ==
As of May 3, 2015

Club	Season	League			Cup		Continental		Total	
Club	Season	Division	Apps	Goals	Apps	Goals	Apps	Goals	Apps	Goals
Deportivo Cuenca	2002	Serie A	11	4	–		0	0	11	4
Deportivo Cuenca	2003	Serie A	10	0	–		0	0	10	0
Deportivo Cuenca	2005	Serie A	13	0	–		0	0	13	0
Deportivo Cuenca	Total		34	4	–		0	0	34	4
LDU Cuenca	2004	Segunda Categoría	19	26	–		–		19	26
LDU Cuenca	Total		19	26	–		–		19	26
LDU Loja	2006	Serie B	32	10	–		–		32	10
LDU Loja	2007	Serie B	26	4	–		–		26	4
LDU Loja	Total		58	14	–		–		58	14
Deportivo Azogues	2008	Serie A	1	0	–		0	0	1	0
Deportivo Azogues	Total		1	0	–		0	0	1	0
Manta	2008	Serie B	38	25	–		–		38	25
Manta	Total		38	25	–		–		38	25
Barcelona SC	2009	Serie A	27	6	–		0	0	27	6
Barcelona SC	Total		27	6	–		0	0	27	6
Chornomorets	2009–10	Premier League	11	0	0	0	0	0	11	0
Chornomorets	Total		11	0	0	0	0	0	11	0
Manta	2010	Serie A	21	1	–		0	0	21	1
Manta	Total		21	1	–		0	0	21	1
Independiente del Valle	2011	Serie A	37	28	–		0	0	37	28
Independiente del Valle	Total		37	28	–		0	0	37	28
Barcelona SC	2012	Serie A	43	30	–		6	1	49	31
Barcelona SC	Total		43	30	–		6	1	49	31
América	2013 Clausura	Liga MX	14	0	8	8	0	0	22	8
América	2013 Apertura	Liga MX	13	5	0	0	1	0	14	5
América	Total		27	5	8	8	1	0	36	13
Atlante	2014 Clausura	Liga MX	7	2	2	0	0	0	9	2
Atlante	2014 Apertura	Ascenso MX	11	2	2	2	0	0	13	4
Atlante	Total		18	4	4	2	0	0	22	6
LDU Quito	2015	Serie A	33	14	–		3	1	36	15
LDU Quito	Total		33	14	–		3	1	36	15
Career total			367	157	12	10	10	2	389	169

== Honours ==
=== Club ===
Barcelona SC

- Serie A: 2012

América

- Liga MX: Clausura 2013

=== Individual ===
- Serie A Golden Shoe (2): 2011, 2012
- Copa MX Golden Shoe: Clausura 2013 Copa MX
