= Damián Díaz =

Ecuadorian footballer (born 1986)

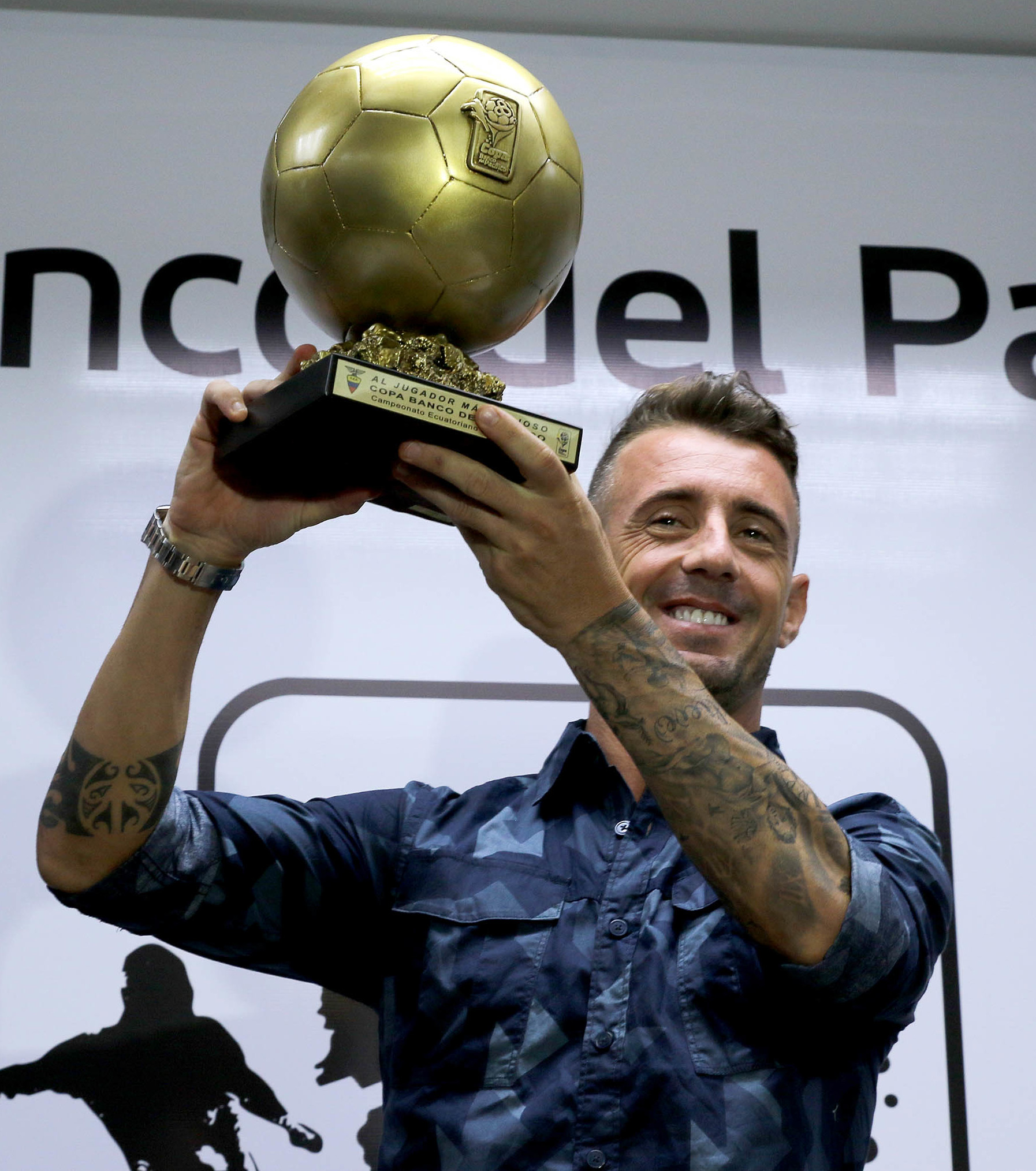
- Díaz in 2017

Personal information
- Full name: Damián Rodrigo Díaz Montero
- Date of birth: 1 May 1986 (age 40)
- Place of birth: Rosario, Argentina
- Height: 1.71 m (5 ft 7 in)
- Position: Attacking midfielder

Team information
- Current team: Guayaquil City
- Number: 10

Youth career
- 1998–2003: Juan XXIII
- 2003–2006: Rosario Central

Senior career*
Years	Team	Apps	(Gls)
2007–2008	Rosario Central	37	(6)
2008–2009	Boca Juniors	7	(0)
2009–2010	Universidad Católica	40	(15)
2010–2011	Colón	35	(6)
2011–2013	Barcelona SC	83	(21)
2013–2015	Al Wahda	52	(15)
2016–2024	Barcelona SC	225	(60)
2024–2025	Banfield	8	(1)
2026–	Guayaquil City	0	(0)

International career^{‡}
2021	Ecuador	4	(0)
- * Club domestic league appearances and goals as of 16:52, 18 July 2025 (UTC) ‡ National team caps and goals as of 28 June 2021

Damián Rodrigo Díaz Montero (Spanish pronunciation: [daˈmjan roˈðriɣo ˈðiaθ], born 1 May 1986), also known as Kitu Díaz, is a professional footballer who plays as an attacking midfielder for Guayaquil City. Born in Argentina, he represents the Ecuador national team.

== Club career ==
=== Rosario Central ===
Díaz began his career at hometown Juan XXIII for then joined the Rosario Central youth ranks. However, after having success at the football academy he signed his first professional contract with The Canallas as a 20-year-old, to finally in 2007, being promoted to the first adult team by then coach Carlos Ischia, who saw in him a lot of talent.

On 8 April, Díaz made his league debut with Rosario in a 2–1 away loss against Godoy Cruz, scoring his side's goal in the 91st minute at Mendoza. However, Díaz scored his second consecutive goal in his second professional game during a 3–0 home victory over Nueva Chicago at Gigante de Arroyito, scoring the second goal of his team on 58th minute.

After a successful 2007–08 season completing 4 goals in 25 games, Díaz was transferred to Boca Juniors, following his coach Carlos Ischia footsteps, who also left the club for Buenos Aires-based team.

=== Boca Juniors ===
After being appointed Boca, Díaz made his official debut in a 4–0 Copa Sudamericana win over last Copa Libertadores champions LDU Quito on 23 September 2008 as an 83rd minute substitution. At La Bombonera team he won the Torneo Apertura (being that his first professional title), which he failed to play it, because he was under the "shadow" of Juan Román Riquelme as the team's playmaker into Ischia's scheme.

In January 2009, he refused go on loan to Greek side Aris Thessaloniki after being taken off the team by Ischia during December of last year, so that he joined the pre-season and played the Torneo de Verano (an Argentine friendly tournament), where played a well role into the starting lineup and made that Ischia shortly after change his decision. On 1 March, Díaz made his league debut during Clausura's fourth week 3–1 home win over Huracán as a starter, being substituted on 46th minute by Nico Gaitán. However, he began to lose importance with Ischia in the team and didn't have a well season again, playing a total of nine games during the year's first half between the league tournament, Copa Libertadores and friendlies (four, two and three games respectively).

=== Universidad Católica ===
On 3 July 2009, Universidad Católica signed Díaz on loan was awarded the number 15 shirt. Díaz arrived as part of Gary Medel's transfer operation to his former club Boca Juniors in a loan barter without purchase option.

==== 2009 season ====
Díaz made his Chilean Primera División début on 27 July 2009, in a 2–0 win over Deportes La Serena at San Carlos de Apoquindo. He scored his first two goals for the club on 23 August, both in a single match against Cobreloa, in where Católica won 2–0 thanks to the goals of Díaz. One month later, he scored his first hat-trick in his career in Católica's 7–0 victory over Curicó Unido. Díaz also scored in the following week against Audax Italiano, match that was won 4–0 by Católica. In that season, Damián was fully consolidated in the position of playmaker at the scheme of Católica's coach, Marco Antonio Figueroa. He was also paired in attack with Juan José Morales and Milovan Mirosevic. The team reached the final against Colo-Colo, but lost 6–4 on aggregate. Following his debut season in the Chilean Primera División, Díaz emerged as one of the league's finest playmakers.

==== 2010 season ====
Díaz began the 2010 season in fine form, scoring the first goal in Católica's 4–0 thrashing of Santiago Morning. In that season, he was playing of great form, but had too much lack of scoring. On 27 March, Díaz scored his second goal in the tournament against Santiago Wanderers in a 4–2 win, which ended a run of 239 minutes of football without a goal. On 14 April, Kitu scored his first goal in the Copa Libertadores, in a 2–0 home win over Flamengo. Due to his successful at Chile, the club of his country Colón de Santa Fe showed interest on him and also came up the possibility of return to Boca Juniors, one of the big teams of Argentina and South America. Despite the possibility of playing in Argentina, one of the best leagues in the world, Díaz was consistent and extended his scoring streak against Ñublense in a game that was won by Católica 4–2, and he was named the man of the match.

Finally, during the break of the league (because it was a long tournament of one year and was played the 2010 FIFA World Cup at South Africa) everything seemed be that Diaz would remain at Católica, but then the player reached an agreement with the club that attempted to sign him Colón and left the club.

=== Colón ===
On 11 June 2010, Colón de Santa Fe signed him for one year, on loan from Boca Juniors.

=== Barcelona Sporting Club ===
==== 2011 season ====
On 11 June 2011, Díaz signed with the Ecuadorian Barcelona. His debut came on 23 July 2011 in a 2–2 away draw against Espoli. In just his third match for Barcelona, Díaz scored his first goal for the club, the only winning goal, in a home win against CD Olmedo on 8 August. His next goal came in a 3–0 home win against Imbabura FC. Díaz' 3rd goal for Barcelona was on 25 September, in a 2–1 home win over Deportivo Cuenca. He then scored a double on 16 October, in a thrilling 3–0 away win over Independiente Jose Teran. His final goal of the season came in Ecuador's Super Clasico, in a 2–0 home win over Emelec on 19 November. He finished the league having played 20 matches, scoring 6 goals and assisted 3 more.

==== 2012 season ====
In 2012 Barcelona signed Díaz to a 4-year contract, when Díaz was being observed by clubs like Cruz Azul and Fluminense . Diaz has helped Barcelona in their road to win Barcelona 14th Ecuadorian Serie A title. Damian Díaz' first match for the 2012 season was a 3–1 home win over Deportivo Cuenca on 5 February. His first goal of the season came several months later, but was an absolute gem, an over-head goal from a cross nearly 40 yards out, was the second goal in a thrilling 3–0 home win over Tecnico Universitario. On 8 July, Damian Díaz, though in a losing 1–0 match against Deportivo Cuenca, it ultimately led to Barcelona ending up finalists for the 2012 League championship final match.

On 5 August, his next goal-scoring feat would come in a 2–2 away draw against LDU Quito, where he scored both goals, both similar goals, dribbling by 2–3 defenders to score in the back of the net. His next goal was from 25 yards out, in a 2–1 away win against Emelec. On 19 September, Díaz scored an over-head goal which turned to be the winning goal in a 4–3 home Copa Sudamericana 2012 match against Cobreloa. His next goal came in a 4–1 home win over Deportivo Cuenca on 21 October. In a vital Ecuadorian Super Clasico home match held on 4 November, Díaz scored 2 goals in a 5–0 win over city rivals Emelec. On 28 November, Díaz became 2012 Serie A champion after SD Quito defeated Emelec 2–0, which helped Barcelona secure their first Ecuadorian league title since 1997, their 14th title in their history.

==== 2013 season ====
His first match of the season was a 1–1 away draw against Deportivo Quevedo on 26 January. His first goal of the season was on Barcelona's Copa Libertadores 2013 debut, a 2–2 away draw against Nacional of Uruguay, he scored the opening goal from long-range. Next he scored in a historically humiliating defeat to Independiente Jose Teran, scoring the 2–1 lead for Barcelona, then Independiente turn the game around in the final ten minutes, defeating Barcelona 5–2. On 6 March, Díaz scored against the Mexican club Toluca in a Copa Libertadores match, drawing 1–1. On 28 April, Damian scored twice against Ecuadorian giants LDU Quito, in a triumphant 3–0 home win.

=== Al Wahda ===
Díaz moved to the Abu Dhabi club Al Wahda, where he played for two years.

=== Return to Barcelona SC ===
In 2016, Díaz returned to Barcelona SC, signing a four-year contract. He played a decisive role in Barcelona's Ecuadorian Serie A titles in 2016 and 2020, earning the Golden Ball as the league's best player in 2016 and later being named best attacking midfielder, scoring the goal of the season, and being selected in the Ideal XI in 2020. Díaz also helped the club secure qualification for the Copa Libertadores on multiple occasions and entered the top 10 all-time goalscorers in Barcelona SC history.

In January 2017, he obtained Ecuadorian citizenship by executive decree. He continued to deliver standout performances in domestic and continental competitions, including an Olympic goal in 2018 and a notable Copa Libertadores campaign in 2021, where he scored twice in a 3–1 win against Santos and received Man of the Match and Team of the Week honors.

=== Banfield ===
In August 2024, Díaz signed for Banfield a contract running until December 2025, with an option to extend for an additional year, marking his return to Argentine football after 11 years.

=== Guayaquil City ===
In January 2026, Díaz joined Guayaquil City.

== International career ==
Born in Argentina, Díaz was nationalized as an Ecuadorian. On 29 March 2021, aged 34, Díaz debuted with the Ecuador national team in a friendly 2–1 win over Bolivia.

== Honours ==
Boca Juniors

- Torneo de Apertura: 2008

Universidad Católica

- Primera División de Chile: 2010

Barcelona SC

- Serie A: 2012, 2016, 2020
