= Pedro Quiñónez =

Ecuadorian footballer (born 1986)

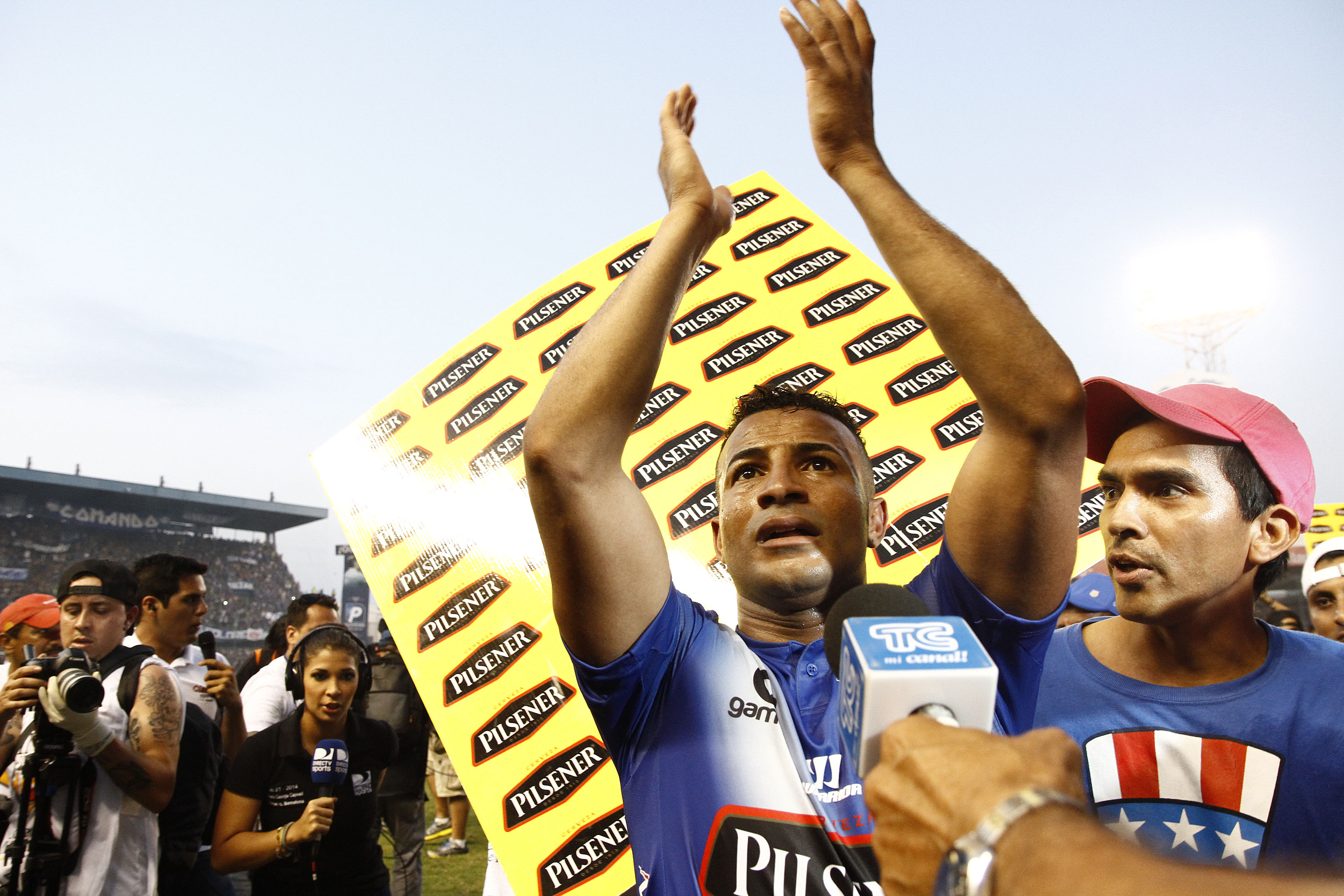

Personal information
- Full name: Pedro Ángel Quiñónez Rodríguez
- Date of birth: 4 March 1986 (age 40)
- Place of birth: Esmeraldas, Ecuador
- Height: 1.72 m (5 ft 8 in)
- Position: Midfielder

Youth career
- 2001–2005: El Nacional

Senior career*
| Years | Team | Apps | (Gls) |
| 2004–2008 | El Nacional | 113 | (10) |
| 2008–2011 | Santos Laguna | 15 | (1) |
| 2010–2011 | → Emelec (loan) | 32 | (0) |
| 2011–2020 | Emelec | 272 | (11) |
| 2020 | El Nacional | 15 | (1) |
| 2021 | Estudiantes | 0 | (0) |

International career
| 2007–2017 | Ecuador | 24 | (0) |
- * Club domestic league appearances and goals as of 09:15, 6 July 2020 (UTC)

Pedro Ángel Quiñónez Rodríguez (born 4 March 1986) is an Ecuadorian footballer.

== Club career ==
Quiñónez signed with El Nacional at the age of 16. He played for the U-16, U-18, and U-20 team before finally getting a senior team cap in 2004. He played at both the senior level and Sub 20 level in 2005, after which he became a full senior team member. In 2005 and 2006, he helped El Nacional win two national championships, tying the club as the most successful team in Ecuador. He is a starting key player and due to his solid performances he was called up to the national team. He can play in many midfield positions as a good option for players needed for a position needed.

On 12 December 2008, Quiñónez signed with Primera Division de Mexico's Santos Laguna from Torreón, Coahuila, for an undisclosed amount.

On 14 January 2010, Quiñónez was transferred on a loan with an option to buy to Ecuadorian giants Emelec. He became a fundamental part of the team during the 2010 season, and his loan was extended until late 2011. In November 2011, Quiñónez was finally bought by Emelec, after paying the transfer to Santos Laguna.

== International career ==
In 2007, he was called up to play in the Copa America 2007 to replace the injured Luis Caicedo, although he was called up he was a non playing member for Ecuador. He played against Mexico on 12 November 2008 in the United States.
