= Hólger Matamoros =

Ecuatorian footballer (born 1985)

Personal information
- Full name: Hólger Eduardo Matamoros Chunga
- Date of birth: 4 January 1985 (age 41)
- Place of birth: Machala, El Oro, Ecuador
- Height: 1.70 m (5 ft 7 in)
- Position: Midfielder

Team information
- Current team: El Nacional
- Number: 7

Senior career*
Years	Team	Apps	(Gls)
2005–2010	Deportivo Cuenca	169	(17)
2011–2013	Barcelona SC	82	(9)
2014–2015	LDU Quito	69	(9)
2016–2019	Emelec	84	(8)
2020–	El Nacional	3	(0)

International career
2009	Ecuador	1	(0)
- * Club domestic league appearances and goals as of 09:09, 6 July 2020 (UTC)

Hólger Eduardo Matamoros Chunga (born 4 January 1985) is an Ecuadorian footballer who plays for C.D. El Nacional.

== Club career ==
=== Club Deportivo Cuenca ===
Matamoros has been playing for Cuenca since 2006. He was part of the squad who participated in the Copa Libertadores 2006. He is known as a key player for Cuenca in recent days. In 2008, he played in the copa libertadores with Lanús, Estudiantes de La Plata, and Danubio F.C. He helped Cuenca achieve a win in the group stage against Estudiantes which finished 1–0 in Ecuador. Although they were eliminated in the group stage, they made a great performance for what was expected from them. Matamoros has recently contributed numerous assists in Cuenca's magnificent run of form in the 2009 Libertadores edition. Placed in Group 2 with Boca Juniors, Deportivo Táchira, and Guaraní, they won all three home games, including a historic 1–0 victory over Boca. They are currently in the Round of 16 with Caracas FC. In the first leg against Caracas, Matamoros played a part in the assist on the final goal that helped win the match 2–1.

=== Barcelona Sporting Club ===
Matamoros played three seasons for BSC.

== International career ==
Matamoros received his first call-up on 4 August 2009, for the upcoming friendly against Jamaica on 12 August 2009, where he made his debut in a 0–0 draw with the Caribbean team.
