= Bolívar Gómez =

Ecuadorian footballer (born 1977)

Personal information
- Full name: Bolívar Efrén Gómez Valencia
- Date of birth: July 31, 1977 (age 49)
- Place of birth: Esmeraldas, Ecuador
- Height: 1.77 m (5 ft 10 in)
- Position: Defender

Team information
- Current team: El Nacional

Senior career*
Years	Team	Apps	(Gls)
1999–2005	El Nacional	156	(1)
2006	Macará	18	(2)
2007–2009	El Nacional	51	(1)
2010–	Manta	91	(1)

International career
1999	Ecuador	1	(0)
- * Club domestic league appearances and goals as of November 16, 2008

Bolívar Efrén Gómez Valencia (born July 31, 1977, in Esmeraldas) is an Ecuadorian football defender. He obtained one international cap for the Ecuador national football team, making his only appearance in 1999.
