= Matías Oyola =

Argentine born Ecuadorian footballer (born 1982)

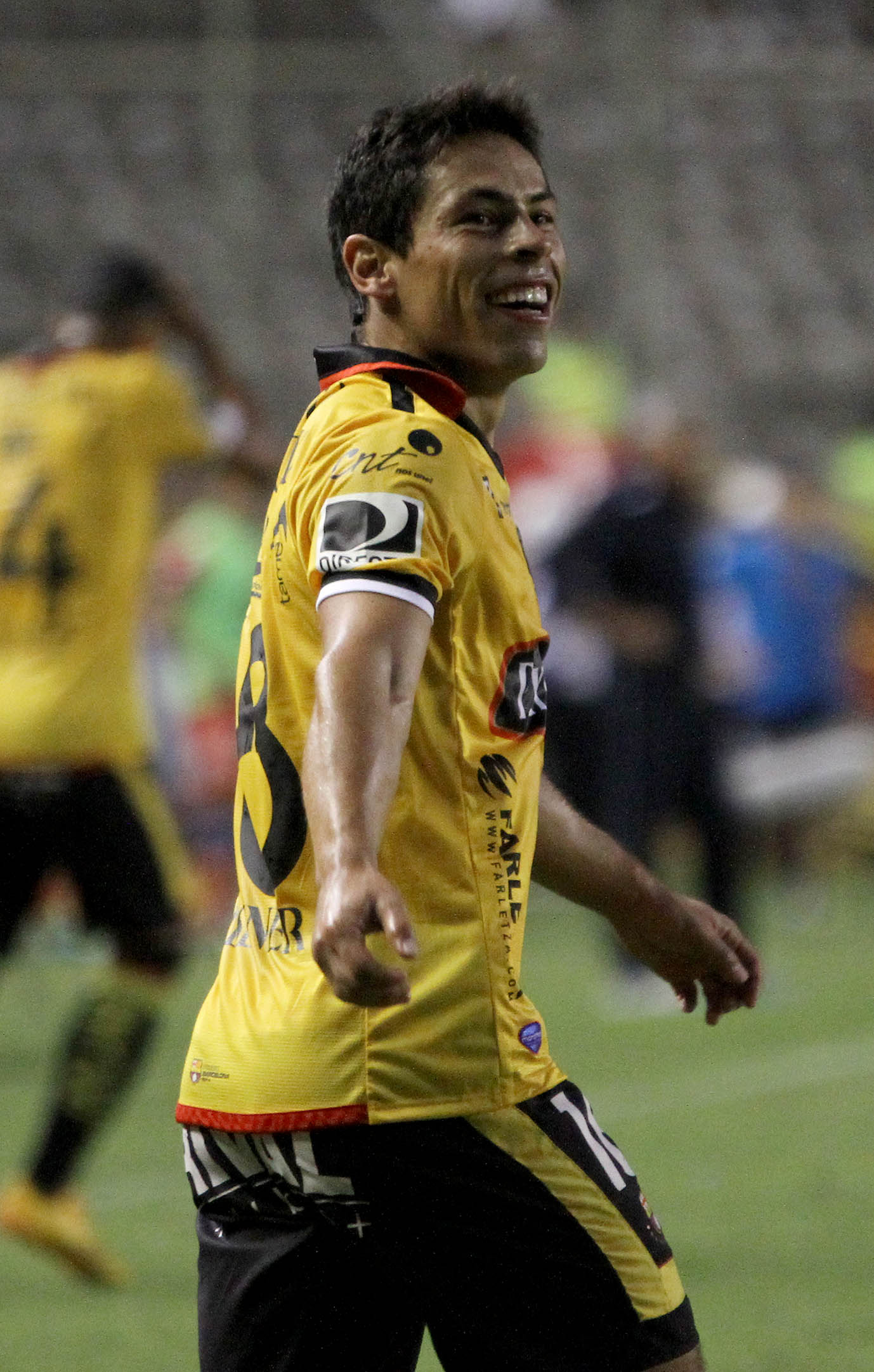

Personal information
- Full name: Matías Damián Oyola
- Date of birth: 15 October 1982 (age 44)
- Place of birth: Río Cuarto, Argentina
- Height: 1.67 m (5 ft 6 in)
- Position: Center midfielder

Youth career
- River Plate

Senior career*
Years	Team	Apps	(Gls)
2002–2007	River Plate	3	(0)
2003–2005	Defensores Belgrano (loan)	62	(8)
2005–2006	Gimnasia de Jujuy (loan)	26	(7)
2007	Belgrano (loan)	17	(3)
2007–2012	Independiente	20	(1)
2008–2009	Colón (loan)	31	(2)
2009–2012	Barcelona SC (loan)	119	(12)
2012–2021	Barcelona SC	241	(20)
2022	Guayaquil City		

International career^{‡}
2016–2017	Ecuador	7	(0)
- * Club domestic league appearances and goals as of 13 December 2015 ‡ National team caps and goals as of 31 August 2017

Matías Oyola (born 15 October 1982 in Río Cuarto) is a retired Argentine born Ecuadorian naturalized football player that used to play as a central midfielder. For the majority of his over 20-year career, he spent it in Ecuador, becoming one of the most acclaimed and important players for Ecuadorian Serie A team Barcelona Sporting Club. Here he spent over 12 years, making him an outstanding fixture, the backbone of the team in the past decade and beginning of the current one for such football institution.

== Club career ==
Oyola came through the youth system at River Plate, in 2003, he was loaned to Defensores de Belgrano of the Argentine 2nd division until 2005.

In 2005, Oyola spent a season with Gimnasia y Esgrima de Jujuy before returning to River Plate in 2006. Oyola only made three first team appearances before his transfer to Belgrano de Córdoba in 2007.

At the end of the 2006–2007 season, Belgrano were relegated and Oyola joined Independiente.

On 7 June 2009, "El Pony" joined the Ecuadorian giant Barcelona for the remainder of the season.

On 5 August 2009, Oyola scored his 1st goal with Barcelona from a splendid free kick.

== International career ==
Oyola was born and raised in Argentina – but he transferred to Ecuador later in his career and got Ecuadorian citizenship. Oyola got his first call up to the senior Ecuador side for 2018 FIFA World Cup qualifiers against Chile and Bolivia in October 2016. Oyola made his debut for Ecuador in a 2–2 tie with the latter, coming on as a sub in the 78th minute.

== Honors ==
Barcelona SC

- Serie A (3): 2012, 2016, 2020
