= José Luis Perlaza =

Ecuadorian footballer (born 1981)

José Perlaza
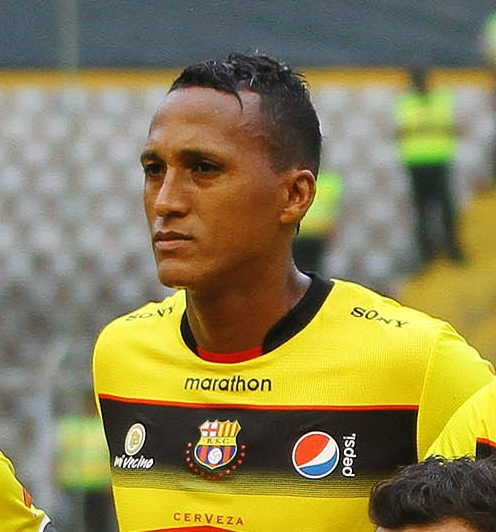
- José Luis Perlaza (2015)

Personal information
- Full name: José Luis Perlaza Napa
- Date of birth: October 6, 1981 (age 45)
- Place of birth: Esmeraldas, Ecuador
- Height: 1.93 m (6 ft 4 in)
- Position: Centre back

Youth career
- 1996–1997: Sport Estudiantes
- 1997–2001: Cinco de Agosto
- 1998: → Calvi F.C. (loan)

Senior career*
Years	Team	Apps	(Gls)
1999	→Audaz Octubrino (loan)	2	(0)
2000	→Olmedo (loan)	17	(1)
2001–2009	Olmedo	227	(8)
2009–2016	Barcelona Ecuador	194	(12)
2016	Mushuc Runa	32	(2)
2017	Olmedo	0	(0)
2018	Liga de Loja	0	(0)
Total		472	(23)

International career
2004–2006	Ecuador	34	(0)
- * Club domestic league appearances and goals

José Luis Perlaza Napa (born October 6, 1981) is an Ecuadoran former footballer who played as a centre back. He was named in the Ecuador national team for the 2006 FIFA World Cup.

== Club career ==
Perlaza started his career at Sport Estudiantes when he was only 15. After Cinco de Agosto bought him, he was loaned out to Calvi F.C., Audaz Octubrino, and Olmedo.

Perlaza had a successful season with Olmedo. He managed to make a good first impression and they bought him for the next season. In Olmedo, Perlaza has played many important games in Copa Libertadores and the Ecuadorian Serie A. He soon became Olmedo's first choice center back due to his tremendous size and skill. Perlaza played 203 games and scored 2 goals total for Olmedo before being transferred out.

In April 2009, Perlaza went on trial for MLS club Toronto FC.

In May 2009, Perlaza joined Ecuadorian team, Barcelona.

== International career ==
Perlaza was part of Ecuador's squad for the 2006 World Cup. Perlaza scored his first goal for Ecuador in an unofficial friendly match against LDU Quito. Ecuador won, 5–0.
