= 2016 Liga Deportiva Universitaria de Quito season =

L.D.U. Quito
2016 season
- President: Carlos Arroyo
- Manager: Claudio Borghi (until March 27); Álvaro Gutiérrez (from April 9 to July 17); Álex Aguinaga (from July 31)
- Stadium: Estadio Casa Blanca
- Serie A: First Stage: 6th Second Stage: 5th Aggregate: 5th
- Copa Libertadores: Second Stage
- Top goalscorer: League: José Cevallos Enríquez (10 goals); All: José Cevallos Enríquez (12 goals)
- Highest home attendance: 21,654; (October 19 v. Barcelona SC)
- Lowest home attendance: 1,813; (November 12 v. Fuerza Amarilla)
- Average home league attendance: 5,257
Home colours	Away colours	Third colours

Liga Deportiva Universitaria de Quito's 2016 season was the club's 86th year of existence, the 63rd year in professional football, and the 55th in the top level of professional football in Ecuador.

== Club ==
=== Personnel ===
President: Carlos Arroyo
Honorary President: Rodrigo Paz
President of the Executive Commission: Esteban Paz
President of the Football Commission: Edwin Ripalda
Vice-President of the Football Commission: Patricio Torres
Sporting manager: Santiago Jácome

=== Coaching staff ===
Manager: Álex Aguinaga
Assistant manager: Pablo Marín, Luis Leguizamón, Franklin Salas
Physical trainer: Javier Solís
Goalkeeper trainer: Luis Preti

=== Kits ===
Supplier: Umbro
Sponsor(s): Chevrolet, Powerade, Discover, DirecTV, Roland

== Squad information ==
Liga's squad for the season is allowed a maximum of four foreign players at any one time, and a maximum of six throughout the season. The jersey numbers in the main table (directly below) refer to the number on their domestic league jersey.

Num	Pos	Nat.	Player	Age	Since	App	Goals	Notes
1	GK	ECU	Leonel Nazareno	21	2015	0	0	
2	DF	ECU	Norberto Araujo (captain)	37	2007	293	2	
3	DF	ECU	John Narváez	25	2016	0	0	
4	DF	ECU	Julio Ayoví	33	2016	0	0	
5	MF	ECU	Jefferson Intriago	19	2014	58	1	
6	MF	ECU	Édison Vega	25	2016	0	0	
7	FW	ECU	Carlos Tenorio	36	2016	61	31	Previously with the club from '01–'03
8	MF	ECU	Fernando Hidalgo	30	2011	209	9	
9	FW	ECU	Daniel Angulo	29	2016	0	0	
10	MF	ECU	José Cevallos Enríquez	20	2014	108	21	Previously with the club from '11–'12
11	MF	ECU	Luis Bolaños	30	2016	156	26	Previously with the club from '02–'05, '07–'08, '11–'12 and '13–'14
12	DF	ECU	José Madrid	27	2013	100	3	
13	DF	ECU	Néicer Reasco	38	2008	546	35	Previously with the club from '97–'00 and '01–'06
14	DF	ECU	José Quintero	25	2015	44	4	
15	MF	ARG	Exequiel Benavídez	26	2016	0	0	
16	FW	PER	Irven Ávila	26	2016	0	0	
17	FW	ECU	Juan Luis Anangonó	27	2016	25	11	Previously with the club in '14
18	MF	ECU	Alejandro Villalva	23	2016	0	0	
19	FW	ECU	Jairo Padilla	24	2016	0	0	
20	MF	ECU	Enrique Vera	36	2013	213	13	Previously with the club from '06–'08, '09–'10 and '11–'12
21	DF	URU	Ramón Arias	23	2016	0	0	
23	MF	ECU	Fernando Guerrero	26	2016	0	0	
24	FW	ECU	Djorkaeff Reasco	17	2016	0	0	
24	MF	ECU	Esteban Dávila	20	2016	0	0	
25	GK	ECU	Daniel Viteri	34	2011	51	0	Previously with the club from '08–'09
26	MF	ECU	Jhojan Julio	18	2016	0	0	
27	DF	ECU	Luis Romero	31	2015	43	2	
28	GK	ECU	José Gabriel Cevallos	17	2016	0	0	
29	MF	ECU	Harold Carcelén	19	2016	0	0	
30	MF	URU	Brahian Alemán	26	2016	0	0	
31	MF	ECU	Anderson Julio	20	2016	0	0	
32	FW	ECU	Hancel Batalla	18	2014	34	1	
33	DF	ECU	Luis Cangá	20	2014	37	2	

Note: Caps and goals are of the national league and are current as of the beginning of the season.

=== Winter transfers ===
Players In
Name	Nat	Pos	Age	Moving from
Julio Ayoví	ECU	DF	33	L.D.U. Loja (Ecuador)
Brahian Alemán	URU	MF	26	Barcelona SC (Ecuador)
Exequiel Benavídez	ARG	MF	26	Atlético San Luis (Mexico)
Edson Puch	CHI	MF	29	Huracán (Argentina)
Édison Vega	ECU	MF	25	Barcelona SC (Ecuador)
Daniel Angulo	ECU	FW	29	Santa Fe (Colombia)
Jairo Padilla	ECU	FW	24	Aucas (Ecuador)
Carlos Tenorio	ECU	FW	36	Bolívar (Bolivia)
Alejandro Villalva	ECU	FW	23	El Nacional (Ecuador)

Players Out
Name	Nat	Pos	Age	Moving to
Andrés Mendoza	ECU	DF	26	TBA
Juan Cavallaro	ARG	MF	21	Estudiantes (Argentina)
Hólger Matamoros	ECU	MF	30	Emelec (Ecuador)
Michael Quiñónez	ECU	MF	31	Mushuc Runa (Ecuador)
Jonny Uchuari	ECU	MF	21	Independiente del Valle (Ecuador)
Jonathan Álvez	URU	FW	27	Barcelona SC (Ecuador)
Narciso Mina	ECU	FW	33	San Martín de San Juan (Argentina)
Miller Castillo	ECU	FW	28	Independiente del Valle (Ecuador)

=== Summer transfers ===
Players In
Name	Nat	Pos	Age	Moving from
Ramón Arias	URU	DF	23	Puebla F.C. (Mexico)
John Narváez	ECU	DF	25	Rocafuerte (Ecuador)
Fernando Guerrero	ECU	MF	26	Club Universidad de Guadalajara (Mexico)
Juan Luis Anangonó	ECU	FW	27	Club Universidad de Guadalajara (Mexico)
Irven Ávila	PER	FW	26	Sporting Cristal (Peru)

Players Out
Name	Nat	Pos	Age	Moving to
Alexander Domínguez	ECU	GK	29	Monterrey (Mexico)
Pervis Estupiñán	ECU	DF	18	Udinese (Italy)
Diego Alberto Morales	ARG	MF	29	Tigre (Argentina)
Edson Puch	CHI	MF	30	Necaxa (Mexico)
Luis Congo	ECU	FW	27	Deportivo Cuenca (Ecuador)

== Competitions ==
Competition	Started round	Final position / round	First match	Last match
Serie A	First Stage	5th	Feb 7	Dec 10
Copa Libertadores	Second Stage	Second Stage	Feb 23	Apr 19

=== Pre-season friendlies ===
January 24 Tarde Blanca	L.D.U. Quito	1–0	América de Cali	Quito
17:15 UTC−05:00	Morales 29'			Stadium: Estadio Rodrigo Paz Delgado; Attendance: 21,527; Referee: Diego Lara

January 31 Noche Escarlata	América de Cali	1–0	L.D.U. Quito	Cali
18:30 UTC−05:00	Lucumí 75'			Stadium: Estadio Olímpico Pascual Guerrero

=== Serie A ===
The 2016 season was Liga's 55th season in the Serie A and their 15th consecutive. The format is identical to the previous season.

==== First stage ====
Pos	Team	Pld	W	D	L	GF	GA	GD	Pts
4	Deportivo Cuenca	22	9	7	6	29	25	+4	34
5	Independiente del Valle	22	10	4	8	28	28	0	34
6	LDU Quito	22	8	7	7	20	23	−3	31
7	Universidad Católica	22	6	10	6	27	27	0	28
8	River Ecuador	22	8	3	11	29	35	−6	27

Overall								Home						Away					
Pld	W	D	L	GF	GA	GD	Pts	W	D	L	GF	GA	GD	W	D	L	GF	GA	GD
22	8	7	7	20	23	−3	31	7	2	2	13	7	+6	1	5	5	7	16	−9

February 7 Round 1	Delfín	2–0	L.D.U. Quito	Manta
12:00 UTC−05:00	Barreiro 59'; Romero 80' (o.g.)	Report		Stadium: Estadio Jocay; Attendance: 3,871; Referee: José Luis Espinel

February 27 Round 5	Fuerza Amarilla	1–0	L.D.U. Quito	Machala
15:00 UTC−05:00	Alonso 16'	Report		Stadium: Estadio 9 de Mayo; Attendance: 12,455; Referee: Roddy Zambrano

March 6 Round 6	L.D.U. Quito	1–1	Universidad Católica	Quito
11:30 UTC−05:00	Angulo 37'	Report	Vides 14'	Stadium: Estadio Rodrigo Paz Delgado; Attendance: 6,639; Referee: José Zambrano

March 13 Round 7	Aucas	0–1	L.D.U. Quito	Quito
12:00 UTC−05:00		Report	Puch 44'	Stadium: Estadio Olímpico Atahualpa; Attendance: 13,247; Referee: Samuel Haro

March 18 Round 8	L.D.U. Quito	1–0	Mushuc Runa	Quito
19:30 UTC−05:00	Puch 75'	Report		Stadium: Estadio Rodrigo Paz Delgado; Attendance: 3,708; Referee: Carlos Orbe

March 23 Round 2 (Postponed)	L.D.U. Quito	0–0	Independiente del Valle	Quito
19:15 UTC−05:00		Report		Stadium: Estadio Rodrigo Paz Delgado; Attendance: 5,012; Referee: José Luis Espinel

March 27 Round 9	Barcelona SC	5–0	L.D.U. Quito	Guayaquil
16:30 UTC−05:00	Velasco 36'; Penilla 43'; Álvez 58'; Esterilla 60', 84'	Report		Stadium: Estadio Monumental Banco Pichincha; Attendance: 25,291; Referee: Daniel Salazar

April 1 Round 10	El Nacional	1–1	L.D.U. Quito	Quito
19:00 UTC−05:00	Lara 68' (pen.)	Report	Alemán 9'	Stadium: Estadio Olímpico Atahualpa; Attendance: 14,903; Referee: Guillermo Guerrero

April 9 Round 11	L.D.U. Quito	0–1	Deportivo Cuenca	Quito
18:15 UTC−05:00		Report	Chalá 42'	Stadium: Estadio Rodrigo Paz Delgado; Attendance: 4,671; Referee: Omar Ponce

April 29 Round 12	Deportivo Cuenca	1–0	L.D.U. Quito	Cuenca
20:00 UTC−05:00	Becerra 70' (pen.)	Report		Stadium: Estadio Alejandro Serrano Aguilar; Attendance: 8,063; Referee: Juan Carlos Albarracín

May 4 Round 13	L.D.U. Quito	1–2	El Nacional	Quito
19:15 UTC−05:00	Angulo 19'	NACIONAL Report	Montaño 38'; Balda 45'	Stadium: Estadio Rodrigo Paz Delgado; Attendance: 4,105; Referee: Carlos Orbe

May 8 Round 14	L.D.U. Quito	2–1	Barcelona SC	Quito
11:30 UTC−05:00	Cangá 56'; Angulo 58'	Report	Vera 32'	Stadium: Estadio Rodrigo Paz Delgado; Attendance: 12,098; Referee: Carlos Vera

May 11 Round 4 (Postponed)	L.D.U. Quito	2–1	River Ecuador	Quito
19:15 UTC−05:00	Cevallos 18'; Lara 73' (o.g.)	Report	Neculman 82' (pen.)	Stadium: Estadio Rodrigo Paz Delgado; Attendance: 2,231; Referee: Edgar Hinostroza

May 15 Round 15	Mushuc Runa	2–2	L.D.U. Quito	Ambato
11:30 UTC−05:00	Quintero 12', 54'	Report	Angulo 8'; Tenorio 90' (pen.)	Stadium: Estadio Bellavista; Attendance: 6,208; Referee: José Zambrano

May 20 Round 16	L.D.U. Quito	2–0	Aucas	Quito
19:30 UTC−05:00	Alemán 36'; Puch 84'	Report		Stadium: Estadio Rodrigo Paz Delgado; Attendance: 6,563; Referee: Roddy Zambrano

June 25 Round 17	Universidad Católica	0–0	L.D.U. Quito	Quito
12:00 UTC−05:00		Report		Stadium: Estadio Olímpico Atahualpa; Attendance: 2,120; Referee: Vinicio Espinel

June 29 Round 3 (Postponed)	Emelec	1–0	L.D.U. Quito	Guayaquil
20:00 UTC−05:00	Mena 77'	Report		Stadium: Estadio Modelo Alberto Spencer Herrera; Attendance: 12,649; Referee: Carlos Orbe

July 3 Round 18	L.D.U. Quito	2–1	Fuerza Amarilla	Quito
11:30 UTC−05:00	Quintero 10', 53'	Report	Cuero 54'	Stadium: Estadio Rodrigo Paz Delgado; Attendance: 2,472; Referee: Samuel Haro

July 8 Round 19	River Ecuador	2–2	L.D.U. Quito	Guayaquil
17:30 UTC−05:00	Giler 19' (pen.); Luna 80'	Report	Tenorio 7'; Alemán 39' (pen.)	Stadium: Estadio Modelo Alberto Spencer Herrera; Referee: Daniel Salazar

July 13 Round 20	L.D.U. Quito	1–0	Emelec	Quito
19:15 UTC−05:00	Cevallos 89'	Report		Stadium: Estadio Rodrigo Paz Delgado; Attendance: 6,199; Referee: Vinicio Espinel

July 17 Round 21	Independiente del Valle	1–1	L.D.U. Quito	Sangolquí
19:00 UTC−05:00	León 28'	Report	Alemán 83'	Stadium: Estadio Rumiñahui; Attendance: 2,852; Referee: Jefferson Macías

July 24 Round 22	L.D.U. Quito	1–0	Delfín	Quito
11:30 UTC−05:00	Angulo 48'	Report		Stadium: Estadio Rodrigo Paz Delgado; Attendance: 3,233; Referee: Juan Carlos Albarracín

==== Second stage ====
Pos	Team	Pld	W	D	L	GF	GA	GD	Pts
3	Universidad Católica	22	8	7	7	29	33	−4	31
4	Independiente del Valle	22	9	3	10	27	26	+1	30
5	LDU Quito	22	8	6	8	21	30	−9	30
6	El Nacional	22	7	8	7	31	30	+1	29
7	Mushuc Runa	22	8	4	10	30	36	−6	28

Overall								Home						Away					
Pld	W	D	L	GF	GA	GD	Pts	W	D	L	GF	GA	GD	W	D	L	GF	GA	GD
22	8	6	8	21	30	−9	30	5	4	2	17	13	+4	3	2	6	4	17	−13

July 31 Round 1	Mushuc Runa	3–0	L.D.U. Quito	Ambato
12:00 UTC−05:00	Quintero 24', 64', 78'	Report		Stadium: Estadio Bellavista; Attendance: 4,928; Referee: Omar Ponce

August 7 Round 2	L.D.U. Quito	2–2	El Nacional	Quito
11:30 UTC−05:00	Cevallos 32'; Anangonó 84'	Report	Lara 26'; Estrada 30'	Stadium: Estadio Rodrigo Paz Delgado; Attendance: 68,36; Referee: José Luis Espinel

August 13 Round 3	River Ecuador	0–1	L.D.U. Quito	Guayaquil
16:00 UTC−05:00		Report	López 50' (o.g.)	Stadium: Estadio Christian Benítez Betancourt; Attendance: 2,391; Referee: Jefferson Macías

August 20 Round 4	L.D.U. Quito	2–1	Emelec	Quito
17:00 UTC−05:00	Cevallos 2', 85'	Report	Guanca 83' (pen.)	Stadium: Estadio Rodrigo Paz Delgado; Attendance: 7,484; Referee: Carlos Vera

August 26 Round 5	Fuerza Amarilla	2–0	L.D.U. Quito	Machala
15:30 UTC−05:00	Ordóñez 64'; Bruno 74'	Report		Stadium: Estadio 9 de Mayo; Attendance: 2,809; Referee: Luis Quiroz

September 10 Round 7	Universidad Católica	0–1	L.D.U. Quito	Quito
12:00 UTC−05:00		Report	Batalla 64'	Stadium: Estadio Olímpico Atahualpa; Attendance: 2,779; Referee: Roddy Zambrano

September 14 Round 6 (Postponed)	L.D.U. Quito	2–1	Independiente del Valle	Quito
19:15 UTC−05:00	Angulo 33'; Tenorio 83'	Report	González 47'	Stadium: Estadio Rodrigo Paz Delgado; Attendance: 3,101; Referee: Daniel Salazar

September 17 Round 8	L.D.U. Quito	2–1	Delfín	Quito
17:00 UTC−05:00	Carcelén 5'; Anangonó 90+1'	Report	Saucedo 14'	Stadium: Estadio Rodrigo Paz Delgado; Attendance: 4,105; Referee: Luis Quiroz

September 21 Round 9	Barcelona SC	2–0	L.D.U. Quito	Guayaquil
19:45 UTC−05:00	Araujo 1' (o.g.); Esterilla 7'	Report		Stadium: Estadio Monumental Banco Pichincha; Attendance: 31,336; Referee: Omar Ponce

September 25 Round 10	Aucas	1–0	L.D.U. Quito	Quito
12:00 UTC−05:00	Carcelén 40'	Report		Stadium: Estadio Gonzalo Pozo Ripalda; Attendance: 8,701; Referee: Mario Romero

September 30 Round 11	L.D.U. Quito	1–2	Deportivo Cuenca	Quito
19:30 UTC−05:00	Cevallos 34' (pen.)	Report	Chalá 39'; Becerra 70'	Stadium: Estadio Rodrigo Paz Delgado; Attendance: 2,046; Referee: José Luis Espinel

October 7 Round 12	Deportivo Cuenca	0–0	L.D.U. Quito	Cuenca
20:00 UTC−05:00		Report		Stadium: Estadio Alejandro Serrano Aguilar; Attendance: 8,648; Referee: Guillermo Guerrero

October 15 Round 13	L.D.U. Quito	2–0	Aucas	Quito
17:00 UTC−05:00	Cevallos 22', 55' (pen.)	Report		Stadium: Estadio Rodrigo Paz Delgado; Attendance: 4,446; Referee: Diego Lara

October 19 Round 14	L.D.U. Quito	1–1	Barcelona SC	Quito
19:15 UTC−05:00	A. Julio 53'	Report	Esterilla 67'	Stadium: Estadio Rodrigo Paz Delgado; Attendance: 21,654; Referee: Roddy Zambrano

October 23 Round 15	Delfín	0–1	L.D.U. Quito	Manta
12:00 UTC−05:00		Report	A. Julio 72'	Stadium: Estadio Jocay; Attendance: 4,000; Referee: Carlos Orbe

October 29 Round 16	L.D.U. Quito	2–2	Universidad Católica	Quito
16:00 UTC−05:00	Anangonó 1'; Guerrero 22'	Report	Arboleda 64'; Escalada 90+1'	Stadium: Estadio Rodrigo Paz Delgado; Attendance: 2,842; Referee: Guillermo Guerrero

November 4 Round 17	Independiente del Valle	1–1	L.D.U. Quito	Sangolquí
16:00 UTC−05:00	Ayoví 90+3'	Report	Cevallos 53'	Stadium: Estadio Rumiñahui; Attendance: 3,013; Referee: José Luis Espinel

November 12 Round 18	L.D.U. Quito	1–1	Fuerza Amarilla	Quito
17:00 UTC−05:00	Cevallos 78'	Report	Wila 33' (pen.)	Stadium: Estadio Rodrigo Paz Delgado; Attendance: 1,813; Referee: Juan Carlos Albarracín

November 19 Round 19	Emelec	3–0	L.D.U. Quito	Guayaquil
16:00 UTC−05:00	Guanca 42' (pen.), 61'; Giménez 68'	Report		Stadium: Estadio George Capwell; Attendance: 18,341; Referee: José Zambrano

November 26 Round 20	L.D.U. Quito	1–0	River Ecuador	Quito
17:00 UTC−05:00	Narváez 69'	Report		Stadium: Estadio Rodrigo Paz Delgado; Attendance: 1,878; Referee: Diego Lara

December 4 Round 21	El Nacional	5–0	L.D.U. Quito	Quito
12:00 UTC−05:00	Mejía 12'; Lara 24'; Estrada 56', 70' (pen.); Garcés 64'	Report		Stadium: Estadio Olímpico Atahualpa; Attendance: 19,037; Referee: Carlos Orbe

December 10 Round 22	L.D.U. Quito	1–2	Mushuc Runa	Quito
16:00 UTC−05:00	Ávila 70'	Report	Patta 39'; Quintero 58'	Stadium: Estadio Rodrigo Paz Delgado; Attendance: 2,509; Referee: Roddy Zambrano

=== Copa Libertadores ===
L.D.U. Quito qualified to the 2016 Copa Libertadores—their 17th participation in the continental tournament—as the runner-up of the 2015 Serie A. They entered the competition in the second stage and were placed in Group 6 with San Lorenzo, Grêmio and Toluca.

==== Copa Libertadores squad ====
No.	Pos.	Nation	Player
1	GK	ECU	Leonel Nazareno
2	DF	ECU	Norberto Araujo (captain)
4	DF	ECU	Julio Ayoví
5	MF	ECU	Jefferson Intriago
6	MF	ECU	Édison Vega
7	FW	ECU	Carlos Tenorio
8	MF	ECU	Fernando Hidalgo
10	MF	ARG	Diego Morales
11	FW	CHI	Edson Puch
12	DF	ECU	José Madrid
13	DF	ECU	Néicer Reasco
14	DF	ECU	José Quintero
15	MF	ARG	Exequiel Benavídez

No.	Pos.	Nation	Player
16	MF	ECU	José Cevallos Enríquez
18	FW	ECU	Alejandro Villalva
19	FW	ECU	Jairo Padilla
20	MF	ECU	Enrique Vera
21	MF	ECU	Luis Bolaños
22	GK	ECU	Alexander Domínguez
23	DF	ECU	Luis Cangá
24	DF	ECU	Pervis Estupiñán
25	GK	ECU	Daniel Viteri
26	MF	ECU	Anderson Julio
27	DF	ECU	Luis Romero
29	FW	ECU	Luis Congo
30	MF	URU	Brahian Alemán

Overall								Home						Away					
Pld	W	D	L	GF	GA	GD	Pts	W	D	L	GF	GA	GD	W	D	L	GF	GA	GD
6	1	1	4	7	12	−5	4	1	0	2	5	5	0	0	1	2	2	7	−5

==== Second stage ====
Pos	Team	Pld	W	D	L	GF	GA	GD	Pts	Qualification
1	(Mexico) Toluca (A)	6	4	1	1	9	5	+4	13	Final stages
2	(Brazil) Grêmio (A)	6	3	2	1	10	6	+4	11	Final stages
3	(Argentina) San Lorenzo	6	0	4	2	5	8	−3	4	
4	(Ecuador) LDU Quito	6	1	1	4	7	12	−5	4	

Source: CONMEBOL
Rules for classification: 1) points; 2) goal difference; 3) goals scored; 4) away goals scored; 5) drawing of lots.
(A) Advanced to the round of 16

February 23 Second Stage	L.D.U. Quito (Ecuador)	2–0	(Argentina) San Lorenzo	Quito, Ecuador
17:30 UTC−05:00	Morales 50', 90+2'	Report		Stadium: Estadio Rodrigo Paz Delgado; Attendance: 19,966; Referee: Jonhatan Fuentes (Uruguay)

March 2 Second Stage	Grêmio (Brazil)	4–0	(Ecuador) L.D.U. Quito	Porto Alegre, Brazil
21:45 UTC−03:00	Maicon 11'; Bolaños 36'; Henrique Almeida 83'; Everton 89'	Report		Stadium: Arena do Grêmio; Attendance: 37,702; Referee: Jesús Valenzuela (Venezuela)

March 10 Second Stage	L.D.U. Quito (Ecuador)	1–2	(Mexico) Toluca	Quito, Ecuador
19:45 UTC−05:00	Hidalgo 47'	Report	Tenorio 41' (o.g.); Uribe 84'	Stadium: Estadio Rodrigo Paz Delgado; Referee: Wilson Lamourox (Colombia)

April 5 Second Stage	Toluca (Mexico)	2–1	(Ecuador) L.D.U. Quito	Toluca, Mexico
19:45 UTC−05:00	Vega 19'; Triverio 62'	Report	Puch 17'	Stadium: Estadio Nemesio Díez; Referee: José Argote (Venezuela)

April 13 Second Stage	L.D.U. Quito (Ecuador)	2–3	(Brazil) Grêmio	Quito, Ecuador
19:45 UTC−05:00	Quintero 46'; Cevallos 77'	Report	Douglas 12'; Bobô 26'; Walace 52'	Stadium: Estadio Rodrigo Paz Delgado; Referee: Roberto Tobar (Chile)

April 19 Second Stage	San Lorenzo (Argentina)	1–1	(Ecuador) L.D.U. Quito	Buenos Aires, Argentina
21:45 UTC−03:00	Ávila 80'	Report	Cevallos 77'	Stadium: Estadio Pedro Bidegain; Referee: Ulises Mereles (Paraguay)

== Player statistics ==
Num	Pos	Player	App	Goal	Yellow card	Red card	App	Goal	Yellow card	Red card	App	Goal	Yellow card	Red card
Num	Pos	Player	Serie A				Copa Libertadores				Total			
1	GF	Leonel Nazareno	2	—	1	—	—	—	—	—	2	—	1	—
2	DF	Norberto Araujo	26	—	2	1	3	—	2	—	29	—	4	1
3	DF	John Narváez	14	1	7	—	—	—	—	—	14	1	7	—
4	DF	Julio Ayoví	12	—	2	—	3	—	1	—	15	—	3	—
5	MF	Jefferson Intriago	17	—	6	—	—	—	—	—	17	—	6	—
6	MF	Édison Vega	33	—	7	2	6	—	—	—	39	—	7	2
7	FW	Carlos Tenorio	22	3	3	—	5	—	1	—	27	3	4	—
8	MF	Fernando Hidalgo	14	—	4	—	4	1	1	—	18	1	5	—
9	FW	Daniel Angulo	27	6	8	—	—	—	—	—	27	6	8	—
10	MF	José Cevallos Enríquez	40	10	6	—	5	2	—	—	45	12	6	—
11	MF	Luis Bolaños	16	—	2	—	2	—	—	—	18	—	2	—
12	DF	José Madrid	11	—	2	—	2	—	2	—	13	—	4	—
13	DF	Néicer Reasco	9	—	1	—	2	—	—	—	11	—	1	—
14	DF	José Quintero	33	2	10	—	5	1	—	—	38	3	10	—
15	MF	Exequiel Benavídez	20	—	4	—	5	—	2	—	25	—	6	—
16	FW	Irven Ávila	13	1	1	—	—	—	—	—	13	1	1	—
17	FW	Juan Luis Anangonó	15	3	1	—	—	—	—	—	15	3	1	—
18	FW	Alejandro Villalva	10	—	1	—	2	—	—	—	12	—	1	—
19	FW	Jairo Padilla	21	—	—	—	5	—	—	—	26	—	—	—
20	MF	Enrique Vera	27	—	7	—	3	—	—	—	30	—	7	—
21	DF	Ramón Arias	18	—	9	1	—	—	—	—	18	—	9	1
23	MF	Fernando Guerrero	20	1	2	1	—	—	—	—	20	1	2	1
24	FW	Djorkaeff Reasco	1	—	—	1	—	—	—	—	1	—	—	1
24	FW	Esteban Dávila	1	—	—	—	—	—	—	—	1	—	—	—
25	GK	Daniel Viteri	29	—	3	1	1	—	—	—	30	—	3	1
26	MF	Jhojan Julio	8	—	1	—	—	—	—	—	8	—	1	—
27	DF	Luis Romero	28	—	8	—	4	—	—	1	32	—	8	1
28	GK	José Gabriel Cevallos	—	—	—	—	—	—	—	—	—	—	—	—
29	MF	Harold Carcelén	6	1	—	—	—	—	—	—	6	1	—	—
30	MF	Brahian Alemán	34	4	13	1	6	—	3	—	40	4	16	1
31	MF	Anderson Julio	14	2	—	—	—	—	—	—	14	2	—	—
32	FW	Hancel Batalla	8	1	—	—	—	—	—	—	8	1	—	—
33	DF	Luis Cangá	17	1	8	—	2	—	—	—	19	1	8	—
10	MF	Diego Alberto Morales	12	—	3	—	6	2	—	—	18	2	3	—
11	MF	Edson Puch	15	3	3	—	5	1	—	—	20	4	3	—
22	GK	Alexander Domínguez	13	—	2	—	5	—	—	—	18	—	2	—
24	DF	Pervis Estupiñán	8	—	2	—	3	—	—	—	11	—	2	—
29	FW	Luis Congo	1	—	—	—	—	—	—	—	1	—	—	—
Totals			—	39	129	8	—	7	12	1	—	46	141	9

As of December 10, 2016

Note: Players in italics left the club mid-season.

== Team statistics ==
	Total	Home	Away
Total Games played	50	25	25
Total Games won	17	13	4
Total Games drawn	14	6	8
Total Games lost	19	6	13
Games played (Serie A)	44	22	22
Games won (Serie A)	16	12	4
Games drawn (Serie A)	13	6	7
Games lost (Serie A)	15	4	11
Games played (Copa Libertadores)	6	3	3
Games won (Copa Libertadores)	1	1	–
Games drawn (Copa Libertadores)	1	–	1
Games lost (Copa Libertadores)	4	2	2
Biggest win (Serie A)	2–0 vs Aucas; 2–0 vs Aucas	2–0 vs Aucas; 2–0 vs Aucas	1–0 vs Aucas; 1–0 vs River Ecuador; 1–0 vs Universidad Católica; 1–0 vs Delfín
Biggest loss (Serie A)	0–5 vs Barcelona SC; 0–5 vs El Nacional	0–1 vs Deportivo Cuenca; 1–2 vs El Nacional; 1–2 vs C.D. Cuenca|Deportivo Cuenca	0–5 vs Barcelona; 0–5 vs El Nacional
Biggest win (Copa Libertadores)	2–0 vs San Lorenzo	2–0 vs San Lorenzo	–
Biggest loss (Copa Libertadores)	0–4 vs Grêmio	1–2 vs Toluca; 2–3 vs Grêmio	0–4 vs Grêmio
Clean sheets	14	8	6
Goals scored	48	35	13
Goals conceded	65	25	40
Goal difference	−17	+10	−27
Average GF per game	0.96	1.4	0.52
Average GA per game	1.3	1	1.6
Yellow cards	141	64	77
Red cards	9	2	7
Most appearances	(Ecuador) José Cevallos Enríquez (45)	(Ecuador) José Cevallos Enríquez (24)	(Ecuador) Édison Vega (22)
Most minutes played	(Uruguay) Brahian Aleman (3070)	(Ecuador) José Cevallos Enríquez (1518)	(Ecuador) Édison Vega (1724)
Top scorer	(Ecuador) José Cevallos Enríquez (12)	(Ecuador) José Cevallos Enríquez (10)	(Uruguay) Brahian Alemán (3)
Worst discipline	(Ecuador) Édison Vega (2) (red card)	(Uruguay) Ramón Arias (1) (red card) (Ecuador) Djorkaeff Reasco (1) (red card)	(Ecuador) Édison Vega (2) (red card)
Penalties for	4/11 (36.36%)	2/8 (25%)	2/3 (66.67%)
Penalties against	9/11 (81.82%)	3/5 (60%)	6/6 (100%)
League Points	61/132 (46.21%)	42/66 (63.64%)	19/66 (28.79%)
Winning rate	34%	52%	16%

As of December 10, 2016Source: See Competitive matches (above)
