= 2015 Liga Deportiva Universitaria de Quito season =

L.D.U. Quito
2015 season
- President: Carlos Arroyo
- Manager: Luis Zubeldía
- Stadium: Estadio Casa Blanca
- Serie A: First Stage: 1st Second Stage: 2nd Aggregate: 1st Overall: 2nd (Runner-up)
- Copa Sudamericana: Round of 16
- Top goalscorer: League: Narciso Mina (14 goals); All: Narciso Mina (15 goals)
- Highest home attendance: 26,151; (April 29 v. Barcelona)
- Lowest home attendance: 2,787; (March 29 v. LDU Loja)
- Average home league attendance: 11,475
Home colours	Away colours	Third colours

Liga Deportiva Universitaria de Quito's 2015 season was the club's 85th year of existence, the 62nd year in professional football, and the 54th in the top level of professional football in Ecuador.

== Club ==
=== Personnel ===
President: Carlos Arroyo
Honorary President: Rodrigo Paz
President of the Executive Commission: Esteban Paz
President of the Football Commission: Edwin Ripalda
Vice-President of the Football Commission: Patricio Torres
Sporting manager: Santiago Jácome

=== Coaching staff ===
Manager: Luis Zubeldía
Assistant manager: Maximiliano Cuberas, Carlos Grueso
Physical trainer: Lucas Vivas
Goalkeeper trainer: Gustavo Flores

=== Kits ===
Supplier: Umbro
Sponsor(s): Chevrolet, Tropical, Discover, DirecTV, Roland

== Squad information ==
Liga's squad for the season is allowed a maximum of four foreign players at any one time, and a maximum of eight throughout the season. At the start of the season, Liga was mandated to start one under-18 player in each match. The jersey numbers in the main table (below) refer to the number on their domestic league jersey. The under-18 players will wear a jersey number of at least #50.

N	Pos	Nat.	Player	Age	Since	App	Goals	Notes
1	GK	ECU	Leonel Nazareno	20	2015	0	0	
2	DF	ECU	Norberto Araujo (captain)	36	2007	248	2	
4	DF	ECU	Andrés Mendoza	25	2015	0	0	
5	MF	ECU	Jefferson Intriago	18	2014	33	0	
7	MF	ARG	Juan Cavallaro	20	2015	0	0	
8	MF	ECU	Fernando Hidalgo	29	2011	165	7	
9	FW	ECU	Luis Congo	25	2014	33	7	
10	MF	ECU	Hólger Matamoros	29	2014	34	7	
11	MF	ECU	Jonny Uchuari	20	2015	0	0	
12	DF	ECU	José Madrid	26	2013	64	2	
13	DF	ECU	Néicer Reasco	37	2008	524	35	Previously with the club from '97–'00 and '01–'06
14	DF	ECU	José Quinteros	24	2015	0	0	
15	MF	ECU	Josué Martínez	18	2015	0	0	
16	MF	ECU	José Cevallos Enríquez	19	2014	64	9	Previously with the club from '11–'12
17	FW	ECU	Narciso Mina	32	2015	0	0	
18	FW	ECU	Miller Castillo	27	2015	0	0	
19	MF	ARG	Diego Alberto Morales	28	2014	32	6	
20	MF	PAR	Enrique Vera	35	2013	200	13	Previously with the club from '06–'08, '09–'10 and '11–'12
21	MF	ECU	Michael Quiñónez	30	2015	0	0	
22	GK	ECU	Alexander Domínguez	27	2006	240	0	
24	DF	ECU	César Batalla	18	2015	0	0	
25	GK	ECU	Daniel Viteri	33	2011	44	0	Previously with the club from '08–'09
27	DF	ECU	Luis Romero	30	2015	0	0	
30	DF	ECU	Luis Cangá	19	2014	31	2	
44	FW	URU	Jonathan Álvez	27	2015	0	0	
50	MF	ECU	Harold Carcelén	17	2015	0	0	U-18 player
51	FW	ECU	Hancel Batalla	17	2014	27	1	U-18 player
54	MF	ECU	Pervis Estupiñán	16	2015	0	0	U-18 player

Note: Caps and goals are of the national league and are current as of the beginning of the season.

=== Winter transfers ===
Players In
Name	Nat	Pos	Age	Moving from
Leonel Nazareno	ECU	GK	20	Promoted from reserve team
César Batalla	ECU	DF	18	Promoted from reserve team
Rodrigo Erramuspe	ARG	DF	24	Huracán (Argentina)
José Quinteros	ECU	DF	24	Aucas (Ecuador)
Luis Romero	ECU	DF	30	LDU Portoviejo (Ecuador)
Harold Carcelén	ECU	MF	17	Promoted from reserve team
Andy Casquete	ECU	MF	16	Promoted from youth squad
Pervis Estupiñán	ECU	MF	16	Promoted from youth squad
Josué Martínez	ECU	MF	18	Promoted from reserve team
Michael Quiñónez	ECU	MF	30	Barcelona (Ecuador)
Jonny Uchuari	ECU	MF	20	LDU Loja (Ecuador)
Miller Castillo	ECU	FW	27	Manta (Ecuador)
Narciso Mina	ECU	FW	32	Atlante (Mexico)

Players Out
Name	Nat	Pos	Age	Moving to
Walter Chávez	ECU	GK	20	Colón F.C. (Ecuador)
Gerardo Alcoba	URU	DF	30	Universidad Nacional (Mexico)
Carlos Arboleda	ECU	DF	23	LDU Portoviejo (Ecuador)
Diego Calderón	ECU	DF	28	Barcelona (Ecuador)
Luis Luna	ECU	DF	26	El Nacional (Ecuador)
Koob Hurtado	ECU	DF	29	Deportivo Cuenca (Ecuador)
Juan Luis Anangonó	ECU	FW	25	Universidad de Guadalajara (Mexico)
Diego Hurtado	ECU	FW	19	Olmedo (Ecuador)
Jonathan Ramis	URU	FW	25	Pumas UNAM (Mexico)

=== Summer transfers ===
Players In
Name	Nat	Pos	Age	Moving from
Andrés Mendoza	ECU	DF	25	New York City FC (United States)
Juan Cavallaro	ARG	MF	20	San Lorenzo (Argentina)
Jonathan Álvez	URU	FW	27	Vitória Guimarães (Portugal)

Players Out
Name	Nat	Pos	Age	Moving to
Rodrigo Erramuspe	ARG	DF	25	Lanús (Argentina)
Danny Cabezas	ECU	MF	22	River Ecuador

== Competitions ==
Competition	Started round	Final position / round	First match	Last match
Serie A	First Stage	Runner-up	Feb 1	Dec 20
Copa Sudamericana	First Stage	Round of 16	Aug 13	Sep 30

=== Pre-season friendlies ===
January 15	LDU Quito	3–1	Universidad Católica	Pomasqui
	Matamoros (?); Mina (?)	Report	Arboleda (?)	Stadium: Country Club de Liga

January 15	LDU Quito	0–0	Universidad Católica	Pomasqui
				Stadium: Country Club de Liga

January 17	LDU Quito	3–2	El Nacional	Pomasqui
	Castillo (?); Mina (?)	Report	Delgado (?); Márquez (?)	Stadium: Country Club de Liga

January 17	LDU Quito	0–0	El Nacional	Pomasqui
				Stadium: Country Club de Liga

January 20	LDU Quito	1–1	LDU Loja	Pomasqui
	Mina (?)	Report	Larrea (?)	Stadium: Country Club de Liga

January 20	LDU Quito	1–1	LDU Loja	Pomasqui
	Estupiñán (?)	Report	Fábio Renato (?)	Stadium: Country Club de Liga

January 24	Sporting Cristal	2–2	LDU Quito	Lima
20:30 UTC−05:00	Blanco 6'; Urquiaga 73'		Mina 23'; Vera 42'	Stadium: Estadio Nacional (Lima); Referee: Manuel Garay

January 28 La Noche Blanca	LDU Quito	4–1	Sporting Cristal	Quito
20:00 UTC−05:00	Matamoros 21' (pen.); Castillo 43'; Cabezas 70'; Cevallos 74'		Manicero 73'	Stadium: Estadio Casa Blanca; Referee: Carlos Orbe

=== Serie A ===
The 2015 season was Liga's 54th season in the Serie A and their 14th consecutive. The league season ran from January to December. The format was identical to the previous season.

==== First stage ====
The first stage of the season ran from February 1 to July 12. Liga finished 1st and qualified for the finals and the 2016 Copa Libertadores during this stage.

Pos	Team	Pld	W	D	L	GF	GA	GD	Pts	Qualification
1	LDU Quito	22	13	8	1	28	10	+18	47	Finals and 2016 Copa Libertadores Second Stage
2	Emelec	22	13	6	3	41	18	+23	45	
3	Independiente del Valle	22	12	6	4	35	24	+11	42	
4	Barcelona	22	10	3	9	33	24	+9	33	
5	Deportivo Quito	22	7	8	7	33	37	−4	29	

Overall								Home						Away					
Pld	W	D	L	GF	GA	GD	Pts	W	D	L	GF	GA	GD	W	D	L	GF	GA	GD
22	13	8	1	28	10	+18	47	10	1	0	20	4	+16	3	7	1	8	6	+2

February 1 Round 1	LDU Quito	1–0	El Nacional	Quito
11:30 UTC−05:00	Mina 7'	Report		Stadium: Estadio Casa Blanca; Attendance: 19,353; Referee: Diego Lara

February 8 Round 2	Aucas	1–1	LDU Quito	Quito
12:00 UTC−05:00	Mallitasig 28'	Report	Castillo 57'	Stadium: Estadio Gonzalo Pozo Ripalda; Attendance: 16,787; Referee: Daniel Salazar

February 15 Round 3	LDU Quito	2–1	Mushuc Runa	Quito
12:00 UTC−05:00	Cevallos 90'; Hidalgo 90+2'	Report	Iza 40'	Stadium: Estadio Casa Blanca; Attendance: 6,603; Referee: Carlos Orbe

February 20 Round 4	Deportivo Cuenca	1–1	LDU Quito	Cuenca
20:00 UTC−05:00	Garcés 28'	Report	Castillo 70'	Stadium: Estadio Alejandro Serrano Aguilar; Attendance: 14,887; Referee: Omar Ponce

February 28 Round 5	LDU Quito	2–1	Emelec	Quito
12:00 UTC−05:00	Quiñónez 6'; Mina 24' (pen.)	Report	Mena 7'	Stadium: Estadio Casa Blanca; Attendance: 15,237; Referee: Carlos Vera

March 8 Round 6	Deportivo Quito	0–0	LDU Quito	Quito
11:30 UTC−05:00		Report		Stadium: Estadio Olímpico Atahualpa; Attendance: 21,198; Referee: José Luis Espinel

March 15 Round 7	LDU Quito	3–0	Universidad Católica	Quito
11:30 UTC−05:00	Quiñónez 39', 46'; Mina 76'	Report		Stadium: Estadio Casa Blanca; Attendance: 7,049; Referee: Daniel Salazar

March 25 Round 9	River Ecuador	1–1	LDU Quito	Guayaquil
16:30 UTC−05:00	Néculman 61'	Report	Morales 66'	Stadium: Estadio Christian Benítez; Attendance: 5,973; Referee: Vinicio Espinel

March 29 Round 10	LDU Quito	2–1	LDU Loja	Quito
11:30 UTC−05:00	Mina 15' (pen.); Cevallos 78'	Report	Velásquez 44'	Stadium: Estadio Casa Blanca; Attendance: 2,787; Referee: Samuel Haro

April 4 Round 11	Independiente del Valle	1–1	LDU Quito	Sangolquí
17:00 UTC−05:00	Angulo 16'	Report	Mina 36'	Stadium: Estadio Rumiñahui; Attendance: 7,457; Referee: Carlos Orbe

April 12 Round 12	LDU Quito	2–0	Independiente del Valle	Quito
11:30 UTC−05:00	Mina 54', 74' (pen.)	Report		Stadium: Estadio Casa Blanca; Attendance: 13,674; Referee: Omar Ponce

April 17 Round 13	LDU Loja	0–0	LDU Quito	Loja
19:30 UTC−05:00		Report		Stadium: Estadio Federativo Reina del Cisne; Attendance: 4,993; Referee: Mario Romero

April 22 Round 14	LDU Quito	2–0	River Ecuador	Quito
19:30 UTC−05:00	Castillo 29'; Congo 76'	Report		Stadium: Estadio Casa Blanca; Attendance: 5,559; Referee: Diego Lara

April 26 Round 15	Barcelona	0–1	LDU Quito	Guayaquil
16:30 UTC−05:00		Report	Morales 3'	Stadium: Estadio Monumental Banco Pichincha; Attendance: 22,465; Referee: Carlos Vera

April 29 Round 8 (Postponed)	LDU Quito	2–0	Barcelona	Quito
19:30 UTC−05:00	Cevallos 19'; Morales 69' (pen.)	Report		Stadium: Estadio Casa Blanca; Attendance: 26,151; Referee: Omar Ponce
Note: The match was postponed, by request, because of Barcelona's participation in the Copa Libertadores.

May 3 Round 16	Universidad Católica	1–1	LDU Quito	Quito
12:00 UTC−05:00	Delgado 77' (pen.)	Report	Cevallos 71'	Stadium: Estadio Olímpico Atahualpa; Attendance: 7,711; Referee: José Luis Espinel

May 9 Round 17	LDU Quito	3–1	Deportivo Quito	Quito
18:30 UTC−05:00	Mina 39'; Matamoros 58' (pen.); Morales 72'	Report	Lalinde 83'	Stadium: Estadio Casa Blanca; Attendance: 20,269; Referee: Vinicio Espinel

May 24 Round 19	LDU Quito	0–0	Deportivo Cuenca	Quito
11:30 UTC−05:00		Report		Stadium: Estadio Casa Blanca; Attendance: 8,480; Referee: Juan Carlos Albarracín

June 28 Round 20	Mushuc Runa	0–1	LDU Quito	Ambato
11:30 UTC−05:00		Report	Cevallos 21' (pen.)	Stadium: Estadio Bellavista; Referee: Carlos Orbe

July 4 Round 21	LDU Quito	1–0	Aucas	Quito
18:30 UTC−05:00	Quinteros 44'	Report		Stadium: Estadio Casa Blanca; Attendance: 15,950; Referee: José Luis Espinel

July 7 Round 18 (Postponed)	Emelec	1–0	LDU Quito	Guayaquil
16:00 UTC−05:00	Pinillo 90+2'	Report		Stadium: Estadio George Capwell; Attendance: 6,046; Referee: Roddy Zambrano
Note: The match was postponed, by request, because of Emelec's participation in the Copa Libertadores.

July 12 Round 22	El Nacional	0–1	LDU Quito	Quito
12:00 UTC−05:00		Report	Morales 19' (pen.)	Stadium: Estadio Olímpico Atahualpa; Attendance: 30,697; Referee: Carlos Vera

==== Second stage ====
The second stage of the season ran from July 18 to December 13. Liga finished 2nd during this stage.

Pos	Team	Pld	W	D	L	GF	GA	GD	Pts	Qualification
1	Emelec	22	12	7	3	42	20	+22	43	Finals and 2016 Copa Libertadores Second Stage
2	LDU Quito	22	13	3	6	42	26	+16	42	
3	Universidad Católica	22	12	4	6	35	27	+8	40	
4	Independiente del Valle	22	11	4	7	45	30	+15	37	
5	Aucas	22	8	8	6	27	25	+2	32	

Overall								Home						Away					
Pld	W	D	L	GF	GA	GD	Pts	W	D	L	GF	GA	GD	W	D	L	GF	GA	GD
22	13	3	6	42	26	+16	42	6	3	2	18	13	+5	7	0	4	24	13	+11

July 18 Round 1	Independiente del Valle	1–3	LDU Quito	Sangolquí
17:00 UTC−05:00	Caballero 56' (pen.)	Report	Mina 11', 44'; Morales 82' (pen.)	Stadium: Estadio Rumiñahui; Attendance: 2,774; Referee: Juan Carlos Albarracín

July 25 Round 2	LDU Quito	1–1	Universidad Católica	Quito
18:30 UTC−05:00	Mina 2' (pen.)	Report	Delgado 57'	Stadium: Estadio Casa Blanca; Attendance: 4,868; Referee: Luis Quiroz

July 29 Round 3	River Ecuador	1–0	LDU Quito	Guayaquil
19:00 UTC−05:00	Cazares 24'	Report		Stadium: Estadio Christian Benítez; Attendance: 2,907; Referee: Diego Lara

August 2 Round 4	LDU Quito	2–1	Emelec	Quito
11:30 UTC−05:00	Quinteros 7'; Mina 13' (pen.)	Report	Achilier 59'	Stadium: Estadio Casa Blanca; Attendance: 11,601; Referee: Omar Ponce

August 9 Round 5	Aucas	3–2	LDU Quito	Quito
11:30 UTC−05:00	Carcelén 37'; Bolaños 45+1' (pen.); Villacrés 89'	Report	Quinteros 45+4'; Morales 63'	Stadium: Estadio Gonzalo Pozo Ripalda; Attendance: 12,921; Referee: Roddy Zambrano

August 23 Round 7	Deportivo Quito	1–4	LDU Quito	Quito
12:00 UTC−05:00	Bonett 73'	Report	Quinteros 43'; Congo 59'; Álvez 60' (pen.); Morales 86'	Stadium: Estadio Olímpico Atahualpa; Attendance: 9,451; Referee: Daniel Salazar

August 30 Round 8	Mushuc Runa	1–3	LDU Quito	Ambato
11:00 UTC−05:00	Ordóñes 4'	Report	Álvez 45+1', 59'; Intriago 68'	Stadium: Estadio Bellavista; Referee: Carlos Orbe

September 6 Round 9	LDU Quito	2–0	Barcelona	Quito
11:30 UTC−05:00	Morales 26'; Cevallos 90'	Report		Stadium: Estadio Casa Blanca; Attendance: 25,355; Referee: Daniel Salazar

September 11 Round 10	Deportivo Cuenca	0–1	LDU Quito	Cuenca
20:00 UTC−05:00		Report	Cevallos 58'	Stadium: Estadio Alejandro Serrano Aguilar; Attendance: 13,393; Referee: Omar Ponce

September 20 Round 11	LDU Quito	1–1	El Nacional	Quito
11:30 UTC−05:00	Álvez 56'	Report	Ordóñez 14'	Stadium: Estadio Casa Blanca; Attendance: 4,755; Referee: Vinicio Espinel

September 27 Round 12	El Nacional	1–5	LDU Quito	Quito
11:30 UTC−05:00	Caicedo 32'	Report	Morales 6'; Mina 36', 54'; Matamoros 72' (pen.); Palacios 90' (o.g.)	Stadium: Estadio Olímpico Atahualpa; Attendance: 9,582; Referee: Daniel Salazar

October 4 Round 13	LDU Quito	3–2	Deportivo Cuenca	Quito
11:30 UTC−05:00	Romero 6'; Morales 32' (pen.); Álvez 78'	Report	Bolaños 49' (pen.); Solari 72'	Stadium: Estadio Casa Blanca; Attendance: 4,247; Referee: Diego Lara

October 9 Round 6 (Postponed)	LDU Quito	1–2	LDU Loja	Quito
11:30 UTC−05:00	Madrid 80'	Report	Orué 23', 67'	Stadium: Estadio Casa Blanca; Attendance: 5,786; Referee: Édgar Hinostroza

October 18 Round 14	Barcelona	1–0	LDU Quito	Guayaquil
16:30 UTC−05:00	Castillo 3'	Report		Stadium: Estadio Monumental Banco Pichincha; Attendance: 15,125; Referee: Carlos Vera

October 25 Round 15	LDU Quito	1–1	Mushuc Runa	Quito
11:30 UTC−05:00	Álvez 58' (pen.)	Report	Cellay 37'	Stadium: Estadio Casa Blanca; Attendance: 3,379; Referee: José Luis Espinel

October 30 Round 16	LDU Quito	2–0	Deportivo Quito	Quito
19:15 UTC−05:00	Álvez 34' (pen.), 36'	Report		Stadium: Estadio Casa Blanca; Attendance: 6,792; Referee: Juan Carlos Albarracín

November 6 Round 17	LDU Loja	2–3	LDU Quito	Loja
20:00 UTC−05:00	Caffa 25' (pen.), 33'	Report	Cevallos 57'; Cavallaro 65'; Álvez 90+3'	Stadium: Estadio Federativo Reina del Cisne; Attendance: 4,298; Referee: Omar Ponce

November 22 Round 18	LDU Quito	0–2	Aucas	Quito
11:30 UTC−05:00		Report	Preciado 29'; Salaberry 34'	Stadium: Estadio Casa Blanca; Attendance: 10,814; Referee: Diego Lara

November 29 Round 19	Emelec	0–2	LDU Quito	Manta
16:00 UTC−05:00		Report	Álvez 54'; Romero 65'	Stadium: Estadio Jocay; Attendance: 17,497; Referee: Omar Ponce

December 2 Round 20	LDU Quito	1–0	River Ecuador	Quito
19:15 UTC−05:00	Cevallos 74'	Report		Stadium: Estadio Casa Blanca; Attendance: 7,703; Referee: José Ramón Zambrano

December 6 Round 21	Universidad Católica	2–1	LDU Quito	Quito
12:00 UTC−05:00	Vides 41' (pen.); Delgado 73'	Report	Cevallos 62'	Stadium: Estadio Olímpico Atahualpa; Attendance: 22,363; Referee: Vinicio Espinel

December 13 Round 22	LDU Quito	4–3	Independiente del Valle	Ambato
11:30 UTC−05:00	Castillo 8'; Hidalgo 39'; Cevallos 58'; Arroyo 70' (o.g.)	Report	Angulo 11'; Landázuri 28'; Cortéz 78'	Stadium: Estadio Bellavista; Attendance: 11,457; Referee: Diego Lara

==== Finals ====
Standings
Pos	Team	Pld	W	D	L	GF	GA	GD	Pts
1	Emelec	2	1	1	0	3	1	+2	4
2	LDU Quito	2	0	1	1	1	3	−2	1

Overall								Home						Away					
Pld	W	D	L	GF	GA	GD	Pts	W	D	L	GF	GA	GD	W	D	L	GF	GA	GD
2	0	1	1	1	3	−2	1	0	1	0	0	0	0	0	0	1	1	3	−2

December 16	Emelec	3–1	LDU Quito	Portoviejo
19:15 UTC−05:00	Gaibor 8'; Mena 49', 66'	Report	Cevallos 83'	Stadium: Estadio Reales Tamarindos; Attendance: 14,023; Referee: Vinicio Espinel

December 20	LDU Quito	0–0	Emelec	Quito
11:30 UTC−05:00		Report		Stadium: Estadio Casa Blanca; Attendance: 26,045; Referee: Daniel Salazar

=== Copa Sudamericana ===
==== Copa Sudamericana squad ====
No.	Pos.	Nation	Player
1	GK	ECU	Leonel Nazareno
2	DF	ECU	Norberto Araujo (captain)
4	DF	ECU	Andrés Mendoza
5	MF	ECU	Jefferson Intriago
6	DF	ECU	Pervis Estupiñán
7	MF	ARG	Juan Cavallaro
8	MF	ECU	Fernando Hidalgo
9	FW	ECU	Luis Congo
10	MF	ECU	Hólger Matamoros
11	MF	ECU	Jonny Uchuari
12	DF	ECU	José Madrid
13	DF	ECU	Néicer Reasco
14	DF	ECU	José Quinteros
15	DF	ECU	Jorge Carcelén

No.	Pos.	Nation	Player
16	MF	ECU	José Cevallos
17	FW	ECU	Narciso Mina
18	FW	ECU	Miller Castillo
19	MF	ARG	Diego Morales
20	MF	PAR	Enrique Vera
21	MF	ECU	Michael Quiñónez
22	GK	ECU	Alexander Domínguez
24	DF	ECU	César Batalla
25	GK	ECU	Daniel Viteri
27	DF	ECU	Luis Romero
28	FW	URU	Jonathan Álvez
29	MF	ECU	Harold Carcelén
30	DF	ECU	Luis Cangá

Overall								Home						Away					
Pld	W	D	L	GF	GA	GD	Pts	W	D	L	GF	GA	GD	W	D	L	GF	GA	GD
6	4	1	1	6	3	+3	13	3	0	0	4	0	+4	1	1	1	2	3	−1

==== First stage ====
August 13 First Stage	Zamora (Venezuela)	1–1	(Ecuador) LDU Quito	Barinas, Venezuela
19:15 UTC−04:30	Soteldo 29'	Report	Morales 53'	Stadium: Estadio Agustín Tovar; Referee: Henry Gambetta

August 19 First Stage	LDU Quito (Ecuador)	2–0	(Venezuela) Zamora	Quito, Ecuador
16:30 UTC−05:00	Morales 19'; Reasco 90+2'	Report		Stadium: Estadio Casa Blanca; Attendance: 16,714; Referee: Gery Vargas

LDU Quito won 3–1 on aggregate and advanced to the second stage (Match O1).

==== Second stage ====
August 26 Second Stage	LDU Quito (Ecuador)	1–0	(Paraguay) Nacional	Quito, Ecuador
16:45 UTC−05:00	Matamoros 40'	Report		Stadium: Estadio Casa Blanca; Attendance: 17,235; Referee: Víctor Carrillo

September 16 Second Stage	Nacional (Paraguay)	0–1	(Ecuador) LDU Quito	Asunción, Paraguay
18:00 UTC−04:00		Report	Cavallaro 85' (pen.)	Stadium: Estadio Defensores del Chaco; Referee: Luiz de Oliveira

LDU Quito won 2–0 on aggregate and advanced to the round of 16 (Match A).

==== Round of 16 ====
September 23 Round of 16	River Plate (Argentina)	2–0	(Ecuador) LDU Quito	Buenos Aires, Argentina
19:00 UTC−03:00	Alario 27'; Mora 76'	Report		Stadium: Estadio Monumental Antonio Vespucio Liberti; Referee: Christian Ferreyra

September 30 Round of 16	LDU Quito (Ecuador)	1–0	(Argentina) River Plate	Quito, Ecuador
17:45 UTC−05:00	Mina 54'	Report		Stadium: Estadio Casa Blanca; Attendance: 26,495; Referee: Wilmar Roldán

River Plate won 2–1 on aggregate and advanced to the quarterfinals.

== Player statistics ==
Num	Pos	Player	App	Goal	Yellow card	Red card	App	Goal	Yellow card	Red card	App	Goal	Yellow card	Red card
Num	Pos	Player	Serie A				Copa Sudamericana				Total			
1	GF	Leonel Nazareno	—	—	—	—	—	—	—	—	—	—	—	—
2	DF	Norberto Araujo	45	—	4	—	5	—	3	—	50	—	7	—
4	DF	Andrés Mendoza	1	—	—	—	2	—	—	—	3	—	—	—
5	MF	Jefferson Intriago	25	1	3	—	4	—	1	—	29	1	4	—
7	MF	Juan Cavallaro	18	1	1	—	6	1	—	—	24	2	1	—
8	MF	Fernando Hidalgo	44	2	5	—	6	—	1	—	50	2	6	—
9	FW	Luis Congo	23	2	1	1	3	—	—	—	26	2	1	1
10	MF	Hólger Matamoros	35	2	8	—	4	1	1	—	39	3	9	—
11	MF	Jonny Uchuari	7	—	1	—	—	—	—	—	7	—	1	—
12	DF	José Madrid	36	1	9	1	6	—	2	—	42	1	11	1
13	DF	Néicer Reasco	22	—	5	—	3	1	—	—	25	1	5	—
14	DF	José Quinteros	44	4	6	—	5	—	3	1	49	4	9	1
15	MF	Josué Martínez	1	—	—	—	—	—	—	—	1	—	—	—
16	MF	José Cevallos Enríquez	44	12	9	—	6	—	—	—	50	12	9	—
17	FW	Narciso Mina	33	14	7	—	3	1	1	—	36	15	8	—
18	FW	Miller Castillo	28	4	2	—	—	—	—	—	28	4	2	—
19	MF	Diego Alberto Morales	39	11	3	—	6	2	—	—	45	13	3	—
20	MF	Enrique Vera	13	—	5	—	—	—	—	—	13	—	5	—
21	MF	Michael Quiñónez	29	3	2	1	3	—	—	—	32	3	2	1
22	GK	Alexander Domínguez	39	—	10	—	6	—	1	—	45	—	11	—
24	DF	César Batalla	—	—	—	—	—	—	—	—	—	—	—	—
25	GK	Daniel Viteri	7	—	—	—	—	—	—	—	7	—	—	—
27	DF	Luis Romero	43	2	11	—	4	—	—	1	47	2	11	1
30	DF	Luis Cangá	6	—	—	—	4	—	—	—	10	—	—	—
44	FW	Jonathan Álvez	18	10	6	—	5	—	2	1	23	10	8	1
50	MF	Harold Carcelén	—	—	—	—	—	—	—	—	—	—	—	—
51	FW	Hancel Batalla	7	—	—	—	—	—	—	—	7	—	—	—
52	MF	Andy Casquete	1	—	—	—	—	—	—	—	1	—	—	—
54	MF	Pervis Estupiñán	32	—	3	2	2	—	1	—	34	—	4	2
4	DF	Rodrigo Erramuspe	1	—	—	—	—	—	—	—	1	—	—	—
6	MF	Danny Cabezas	—	—	—	—	—	—	—	—	—	—	—	—
Totals			—	69	101	5	—	6	16	3	—	75	117	8

Last updated: December 20, 2015
Note: Players in italics left the club mid-season.

== Team statistics ==
	Total	Home	Away
Total Games played	52	26	26
Total Games won	30	19	11
Total Games drawn	13	5	8
Total Games lost	9	2	7
Games played (Serie A)	46	23	23
Games won (Serie A)	26	16	10
Games drawn (Serie A)	12	5	7
Games lost (Serie A)	8	2	6
Games played (Copa Sudamericana)	6	3	3
Games won (Copa Sudamericana)	4	3	1
Games drawn (Copa Sudamericana)	1	-	1
Games lost (Copa Sudamericana)	1	-	1
Biggest win (Serie A)	5–1 vs El Nacional	3–0 vs Universidad Católica	5–1 vs El Nacional
Biggest loss (Serie A)	0–2 vs Aucas; 1–3 vs Emelec	0–2 vs Aucas	1–3 vs Emelec
Biggest win (Copa Sudamericana)	2–0 vs Zamora	2–0 vs Zamora	1–0 vs Nacional
Biggest loss (Copa Sudamericana)	0–2 vs River Plate	-	0–2 vs River Plate
Clean sheets	22	14	8
Goals scored	77	42	35
Goals conceded	42	17	25
Goal difference	+35	+25	+10
Average GF per game	1.48	1.62	1.35
Average GA per game	0.81	0.65	0.96
Yellow cards	117	61	56
Red cards	8	2	6
Most appearances	(Ecuador) Norberto Araujo (50) (Ecuador) José Cevallos (50) (Ecuador) Fernando Hidalgo (50)	(Ecuador) Norberto Araujo (26) (Ecuador) José Cevallos (26)	(Ecuador) Fernando Hidalgo (25)
Most minutes played	(Ecuador) Norberto Araujo (4500)	(Ecuador) Norberto Araujo (2430)	(Ecuador) Norberto Araujo (2070)
Top scorer	(Ecuador) Narciso Mina (15)	(Ecuador) Narciso Mina (10)	(Argentina) Diego Morales (8)
Worst discipline	(Ecuador) Pervis Estupiñán (2) (red card)	(Ecuador) José Quinteros (1) (red card) (5) (yellow card)	(Ecuador) Pervis Estupiñán (2) (red card)
Penalties for	16/23 (69.57%)	10/13 (76.92%)	6/10 (60%)
Penalties against	6/8 (75%)	1/2 (50%)	5/6 (83.33%)
League Points	90/138 (65.22%)	53/69 (76.81%)	37/69 (53.62%)
Winning rate	57.69%	73.08%	42.31%

Last updated: December 20, 2015 Source:Competitive matches
