= José Cevallos (footballer, born 1995) =

Ecuadorian footballer

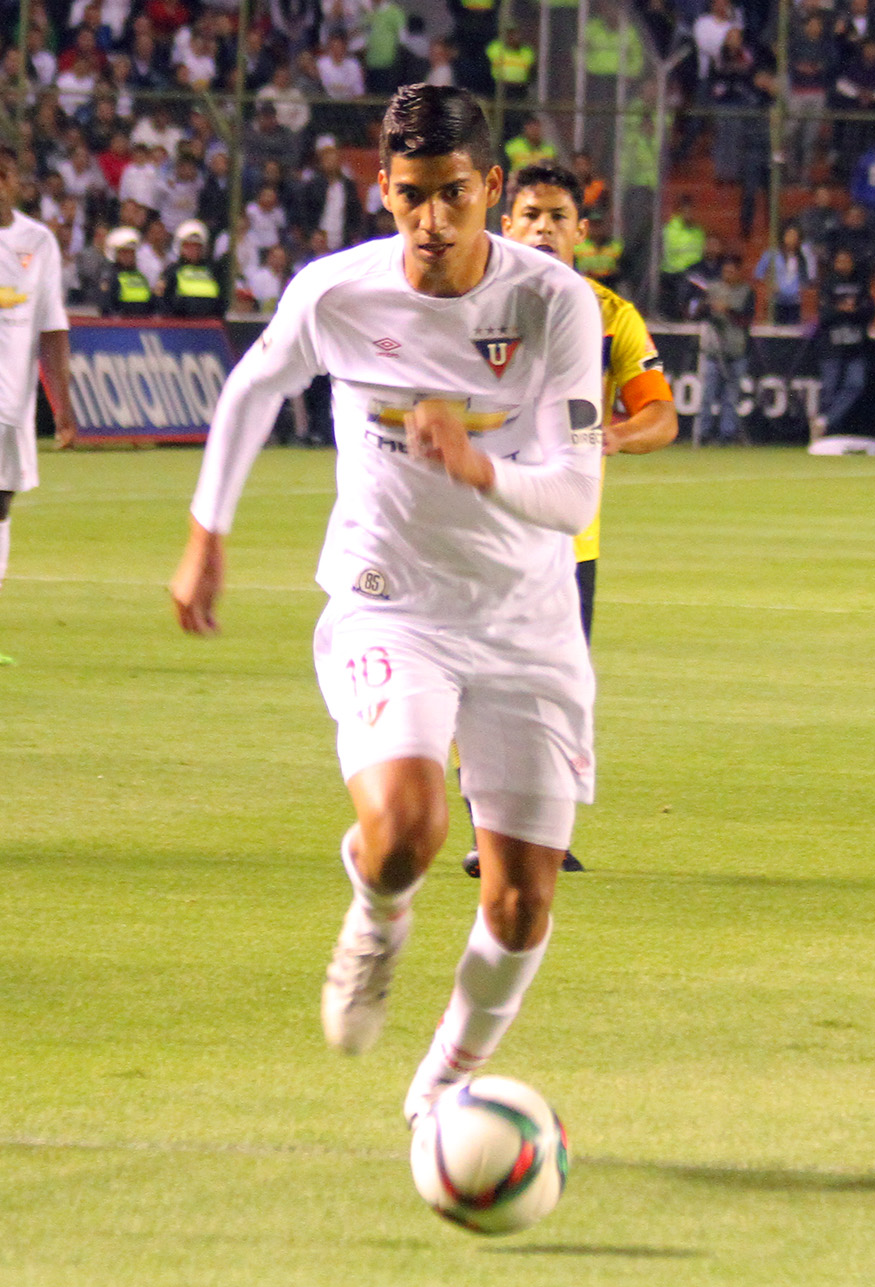
- Cevallos with L.D.U. Quito in 2015

Personal information
- Full name: José Francisco Cevallos Enríquez
- Date of birth: 18 January 1995 (age 31)
- Place of birth: Guayaquil, Ecuador
- Height: 1.86 m (6 ft 1 in)
- Position: Attacking midfielder

Team information
- Current team: Emelec
- Number: 55

Senior career*
Years	Team	Apps	(Gls)
2010–2017	L.D.U. Quito	183	(37)
2013–2014	→ Juventus Primavera (loan)	25	(1)
2018–2020	Lokeren	40	(11)
2019	→ Portimonense (loan)	7	(0)
2020–2023	Emelec	106	(28)
2024	Aktobe	18	(2)
2025	El Nacional	13	(1)
2025–	Emelec	8	(1)

International career^{‡}
2010–2011	Ecuador U-17	11	(5)
2013–2015	Ecuador U-20	12	(5)
2017–	Ecuador	5	(2)
- * Club domestic league appearances and goals as of 20 August 2025 ‡ National team caps and goals as of 16 October 2018

José Francisco Cevallos Enríquez (born 18 January 1995) is an Ecuadorian professional footballer who plays as an attacking midfielder for Emelec. He made his debut for Ecuador on 22 February 2017 in a match against the Honduras and scored the final goal in a 3–1 win.

In a recent poll Cevallos was elected the most promising Ecuadorian footballer to emerge from L.D.U. Quito.

== Club career ==
In January 2013, Cevallos signed a loan deal with Juventus, for two seasons with an option to buy. In July 2014, however, having not played a single professional game for Juventus, Cevallos left the club to return to Ecuador. Cevallos did play in around 14 unofficial matches for Juventus at youth levels or in unofficial friendlies.

On 30 January 2018, Cevallos Jr. signed a contract for 4,5 years at Belgian side Lokeren. The transfer fee was estimated around $1.2 million (€1 million). Cevallos Jr. turned down several local offers. Even an offer from Argentine club Independiente. Cevallos Jr. preferred to develop his skills in Europe.

== International career ==
Cevallos made his international debut on 22 February 2017 against Honduras. Cevallos came on as a substitute with 21 minutes to go and also scored the last goal of the match in the 82 minute.

== Career statistics ==
=== Club ===
As of 9 June 2024

Club	Season	League			National Cup		Continental		Other		Total	
Club	Season	Division	Apps	Goals	Apps	Goals	Apps	Goals	Apps	Goals	Apps	Goals
L.D.U. Quito	2010	Ecuadorian Serie A	0	0	—		—		—		0	0
L.D.U. Quito	2011	Ecuadorian Serie A	10	1	—		1 (Note: Appearance(s) in Copa Libertadores)	0	—		11	1
L.D.U. Quito	2012	Ecuadorian Serie A	35	8	—		—		—		35	8
L.D.U. Quito	2014	Ecuadorian Serie A	19	0	—		—		—		19	0
L.D.U. Quito	2015	Ecuadorian Serie A	44	12	—		6 (Note: Appearance(s) in Copa Sudamericana)	0	—		50	12
L.D.U. Quito	2016	Ecuadorian Serie A	40	10	—		5	2	—		45	12
L.D.U. Quito	2017	Ecuadorian Serie A	35	6	—		4	1	2 (Note: Appearance(s) in Copa Sudamericana playoff)	2	41	9
L.D.U. Quito	Total		183	37	—		16	3	2	2	201	42
Juventus Primavera (loan)	2012–13	Campionato Primavera 1	4	0	—		—		—		4	0
Juventus Primavera (loan)	2013–14	Campionato Primavera 1	14	1	—		4 (Note: Appearance(s) in UEFA Youth League)	0	4 (Note: Appearance(s) in Coppa Italia Primavera)	0	22	1
Juventus Primavera (loan)	Total		18	1	—		4	0	4	0	26	1
Lokeren	2017–18	Belgian Pro League	5	1	—		—		11 (Note: Appearances in UEFA Europa League play-offs)	6	16	7
Lokeren	2018–19	Belgian Pro League	23	4	2	1	—		—		25	5
Lokeren	2019–20	Challenger Pro League	1	0	—		—		—		1	0
Lokeren	Total		29	5	2	1	—		11	6	42	12
Portimonense (loan)	2019–20	Primeira Liga	7	0	—		—		2 (Note: Appearance(s) in Taça da Liga)	0	9	0
Emelec	2020	Ecuadorian Serie A	30	13	—		4	1	—		34	14
Emelec	2021	Ecuadorian Serie A	26	6	—		5	1	1 (Note: Appearance(s) in Supercopa Ecuador)	0	32	7
Emelec	2022	Ecuadorian Serie A	25	6	—		7	1	—		32	7
Emelec	2023	Ecuadorian Serie A	25	3	—		11	1	—		36	4
Emelec	Total		106	28	—		27	4	1	0	134	32
Aktobe	2024	Kazakhstan Premier League	7	1	2	0	—		—		9	1
Career Total			350	72	4	1	47	7	20	8	421	88

=== International goals ===
Scores and results list Ecuador's goal tally first.

No	Date	Venue	Opponent	Score	Result	Competition
1.	22 February 2017	Estadio George Capwell, Guayaquil, Ecuador	Honduras	3–1	3–1	Friendly
2.	12 October 2018	Jassim bin Hamad Stadium, Doha, Qatar	Qatar	3–4	3–4	Friendly

== Personal life ==
Cevallos is the son of Ecuadorian goalkeeper José Francisco Cevallos, who made 89 appearances for the national team and played at the 2002 FIFA World Cup.

Aside from his well known father, Cevallos' family includes his mother Rossi Enríquez, his older brother Francisco Andrés (born 1994) and his younger brothers José Gabriel (born 2000) and Matias (born 2011).
