= 2016 Ecuadorian Serie A =

Copa Banco del Pacífico Serie A
- Season: 2016
- Champions: Barcelona (15th title)
- Relegated: Aucas; Mushuc Runa
- 2017 Copa Libertadores: Barcelona; Emelec; El Nacional; Independiente del Valle
- 2017 Copa Sudamericana: LDU Quito; Deportivo Cuenca; Universidad Católica; Fuerza Amarilla
- Matches: 264
- Goals: 693 (2.63 per match)
- Top goalscorer: Maximiliano Barreiro (26 goals)

The 2016 Campeonato Ecuatoriano de Fútbol Serie A (officially known as the Copa Banco del Pacífico Serie A for sponsorship reasons) is the 58th season of the Serie A.

== Teams ==
Twelve teams are competing in the 2016 Serie A season, ten of whom remain from the previous season. LDU Loja and Deportivo Quito were relegated from the Serie A after accumulating the fewest points during the 2015 season. They were replaced by Delfín and Fuerza Amarilla, the 2015 Serie B winner and runner-up, respectively. Delfín is making their 11th top-flight appearance and their first return to the Serie A since 2001, while Fuerza Amarilla is participating in their first top-flight appearance.

=== Stadia and locations ===
Locations of the 2016 Serie A teams.

Note: Table lists in alphabetical order.

Team	Home city	Stadium	Capacity
Aucas	Quito	Gonzalo Pozo Ripalda	18,799
Barcelona	Guayaquil	Monumental Banco Pichincha	57,267
Delfín	Manta	Jocay	17,834
Deportivo Cuenca	Cuenca	Banco del Austro Alejandro Serrano Aguilar	18,549
El Nacional	Quito	Olímpico Atahualpa	35,258
Emelec	Guayaquil	Banco del Pacífico Capwell	38,963
Fuerza Amarilla	Machala	9 de Mayo	16,456
Independiente del Valle	Sangolquí	Rumiñahui	7,233
LDU Quito	Quito	Casa Blanca	41,575
Mushuc Runa	Ambato	Bellavista	16,467
River Ecuador	Guayaquil	Christian Benítez Betancourt	10,152
Universidad Católica	Quito	Olímpico Atahualpa	35,258

=== Personnel and kits ===
Team	Manager	Kit manufacturer	Shirt sponsor
Aucas	Armando Osma	Lotto	Cooperativa de Ahorro y Crédito Andalucía
Barcelona	Guillermo Almada	Marathon	Pilsener
Delfín	Octavio Zambrano	Boman	Frescodegfer
Deportivo Cuenca	Gabriel Cosenza	Bow Sport	Chubb Seguros
El Nacional	Eduardo Favaro	Lotto	Pilsener
Emelec	Alfredo Arias	Adidas	Pilsener
Fuerza Amarilla	Ángel Gracia	Boman	Oroporto S.A.
Independiente del Valle	Alexis Mendoza	Marathon	Chevrolet
LDU Quito	Álex Aguinaga	Umbro	Chevrolet
Mushuc Runa	Víctor Hugo Andrada	Aurik	Cooperativa de Ahorro y Crédito Mushuc Runa
River Ecuador	Pablo Trobbiani	Astro	Comandato
Universidad Católica	Jorge Célico	New Balance	Banco Pichincha

== First stage ==
The first stage began on February 5 and ended on July 24.

Pos	Team	Pld	W	D	L	GF	GA	GD	Pts	Qualification
1	Barcelona	22	15	2	5	51	19	+32	47	Third stage and 2017 Copa Libertadores group stage
2	Emelec	22	13	4	5	37	23	+14	43	
3	El Nacional	22	10	6	6	32	28	+4	36	
4	Deportivo Cuenca	22	9	7	6	29	25	+4	34	
5	Independiente del Valle	22	10	4	8	28	28	0	34	
6	LDU Quito	22	8	7	7	20	23	−3	31	
7	Universidad Católica	22	6	10	6	27	27	0	28	
8	River Ecuador	22	8	3	11	29	35	−6	27	
9	Fuerza Amarilla	22	6	6	10	22	28	−6	24	
10	Delfín	22	5	8	9	23	30	−7	23	
11	Aucas	22	4	7	11	21	34	−13	19	
12	Mushuc Runa	22	3	6	13	19	38	−19	15	

=== Results ===
Home \ Away	AUC	BAR	DEL	CUE	NAC	EME	FAM	IND	LDQ	MUS	RIV	CAT
Aucas	—	0–1	2–2	1–2	0–0	1–2	1–1	1–0	0–1	1–1	3–1	2–3
Barcelona	3–0	—	2–1	2–2	3–0	5–0	2–1	3–2	5–0	3–1	2–0	6–1
Delfín	0–0	0–2	—	2–1	3–1	2–2	1–2	2–0	2–0	1–1	0–2	0–0
Deportivo Cuenca	2–2	1–2	1–1	—	0–0	0–1	3–0	1–0	1–0	1–0	2–3	1–0
El Nacional	1–1	2–1	2–0	3–3	—	3–1	1–0	5–2	1–1	0–1	1–0	2–2
Emelec	4–0	2–1	1–0	3–0	0–1	—	2–1	1–2	1–0	4–0	3–3	2–2
Fuerza Amarilla	2–1	0–2	2–2	0–0	2–0	1–2	—	2–0	1–0	0–0	0–2	2–2
Independiente del Valle	2–0	2–1	1–1	2–1	1–0	0–2	3–1	—	1–1	2–1	3–0	1–4
LDU Quito	2–0	2–1	1–0	0–1	1–2	1–0	2–1	0–0	—	1–0	2–1	1–1
Mushuc Runa	1–4	1–1	5–1	0–1	0–2	0–3	0–2	1–3	2–2	—	0–1	2–1
River Ecuador	3–0	0–3	1–2	1–3	4–2	0–1	1–1	0–1	2–2	3–1	—	1–0
Universidad Católica	0–1	1–0	1–0	2–2	2–3	0–0	1–0	0–0	0–0	1–1	3–0	—

Updated to match(es) played on July 24, 2016. Source:
Legend: Blue = home team win; Yellow = draw; Red = away team win.

== Second stage ==
The second stage began on July 31 and ended on December 10.

Pos	Team	Pld	W	D	L	GF	GA	GD	Pts	Qualification
1	Barcelona	22	16	4	2	42	16	+26	52	Third stage and 2017 Copa Libertadores group stage
2	Emelec	22	14	3	5	44	25	+19	45	
3	Universidad Católica	22	8	7	7	29	33	−4	31	
4	Independiente del Valle	22	9	3	10	27	26	+1	30	
5	LDU Quito	22	8	6	8	21	30	−9	30	
6	El Nacional	22	7	8	7	31	30	+1	29	
7	Mushuc Runa	22	8	4	10	30	36	−6	28	
8	Deportivo Cuenca	22	7	5	10	30	35	−5	26	
9	Delfín	22	7	4	11	28	32	−4	25	
10	Fuerza Amarilla	22	6	7	9	27	34	−7	25	
11	Aucas	22	5	9	8	26	27	−1	24	
12	River Ecuador	22	6	2	14	20	31	−11	20	

=== Results ===
Home \ Away	AUC	BAR	DEL	CUE	NAC	EME	FAM	IND	LDQ	MUS	RIV	CAT
Aucas	—	1–2	1–1	1–0	0–0	1–3	5–0	0–2	1–0	0–1	3–1	2–0
Barcelona	3–3	—	3–0	5–0	1–0	1–2	5–1	1–0	2–0	3–1	1–0	3–1
Delfín	1–1	0–1	—	2–2	5–0	4–3	0–1	1–0	0–1	2–1	0–0	3–1
Deportivo Cuenca	1–1	0–1	3–1	—	1–1	2–2	3–2	0–1	0–0	3–1	3–0	0–1
El Nacional	2–2	0–1	5–2	2–3	—	1–2	0–0	2–1	5–0	2–1	2–1	1–2
Emelec	2–1	0–1	1–0	2–1	2–2	—	3–1	2–1	3–0	3–2	5–0	1–1
Fuerza Amarilla	1–1	1–1	2–3	3–0	2–0	0–2	—	1–2	2–0	1–2	2–1	2–0
Independiente del Valle	1–1	2–0	2–1	0–1	0–1	0–3	0–0	—	1–1	1–0	3–2	5–0
LDU Quito	2–0	1–1	2–1	1–2	2–2	2–1	1–1	2–1	—	1–2	1–0	2–2
Mushuc Runa	2–0	2–4	1–0	3–2	1–1	3–0	1–1	1–3	3–0	—	0–2	1–1
River Ecuador	1–0	0–1	0–1	2–1	1–2	0–2	2–1	3–0	0–1	0–0	—	3–0
Universidad Católica	1–1	1–1	1–0	3–2	0–0	1–0	2–2	3–1	0–1	6–1	2–1	—

Updated to match(es) played on December 10, 2016. Source:
Legend: Blue = home team win; Yellow = draw; Red = away team win.

== Third stage ==
As Barcelona won both the first stage and the second stage, the third stage was not played and Barcelona became champions automatically. Emelec became runners-up by virtue of the aggregate table.

Campeonato Ecuatoriano de Fútbol
2016 Serie A champion
Barcelona
15th title

== Aggregate table ==
Pos	Team	Pld	W	D	L	GF	GA	GD	Pts	Qualification or relegation
1	Barcelona	44	31	6	7	93	35	+58	99	Copa Libertadores group stage
2	Emelec	44	27	7	10	81	48	+33	88	Copa Libertadores group stage
3	El Nacional	44	17	14	13	63	58	+5	65	Copa Libertadores second stage
4	Independiente del Valle	44	19	7	18	55	54	+1	64	Copa Libertadores first stage
5	LDU Quito	44	16	13	15	41	53	−12	61	Copa Sudamericana first stage
6	Deportivo Cuenca	44	16	12	16	59	60	−1	60	Copa Sudamericana first stage
7	Universidad Católica	44	14	17	13	56	60	−4	59	Copa Sudamericana first stage
8	Fuerza Amarilla	44	12	13	19	49	62	−13	49	Copa Sudamericana first stage
9	Delfín	44	12	12	20	51	62	−11	48	
10	River Ecuador	44	14	5	25	49	66	−17	47	
11	Aucas	44	9	16	19	47	61	−14	43	Serie B
12	Mushuc Runa	44	11	10	23	49	74	−25	43	Serie B

Updated to match(es) played on 10 December 2016. Source: Ecuafutbol

== Top goalscorers ==
Rank	Player	Nationality	Club	Goals
1	Maximiliano Barreiro	ARG	Delfín	26
2	Carlos Luis Quintero	ECU	Mushuc Runa	22
3	Cristian Guanca	ARG	Emelec	21
4	Jonathan Álvez	URU	Barcelona	20
5	Michael Estrada	ECU	El Nacional	19
5	Raúl Becerra	ARG	Deportivo Cuenca	19
7	Ángel Mena	ECU	Emelec	16
