= Jonathan Álvez =

Uruguayan footballer (born 1988)

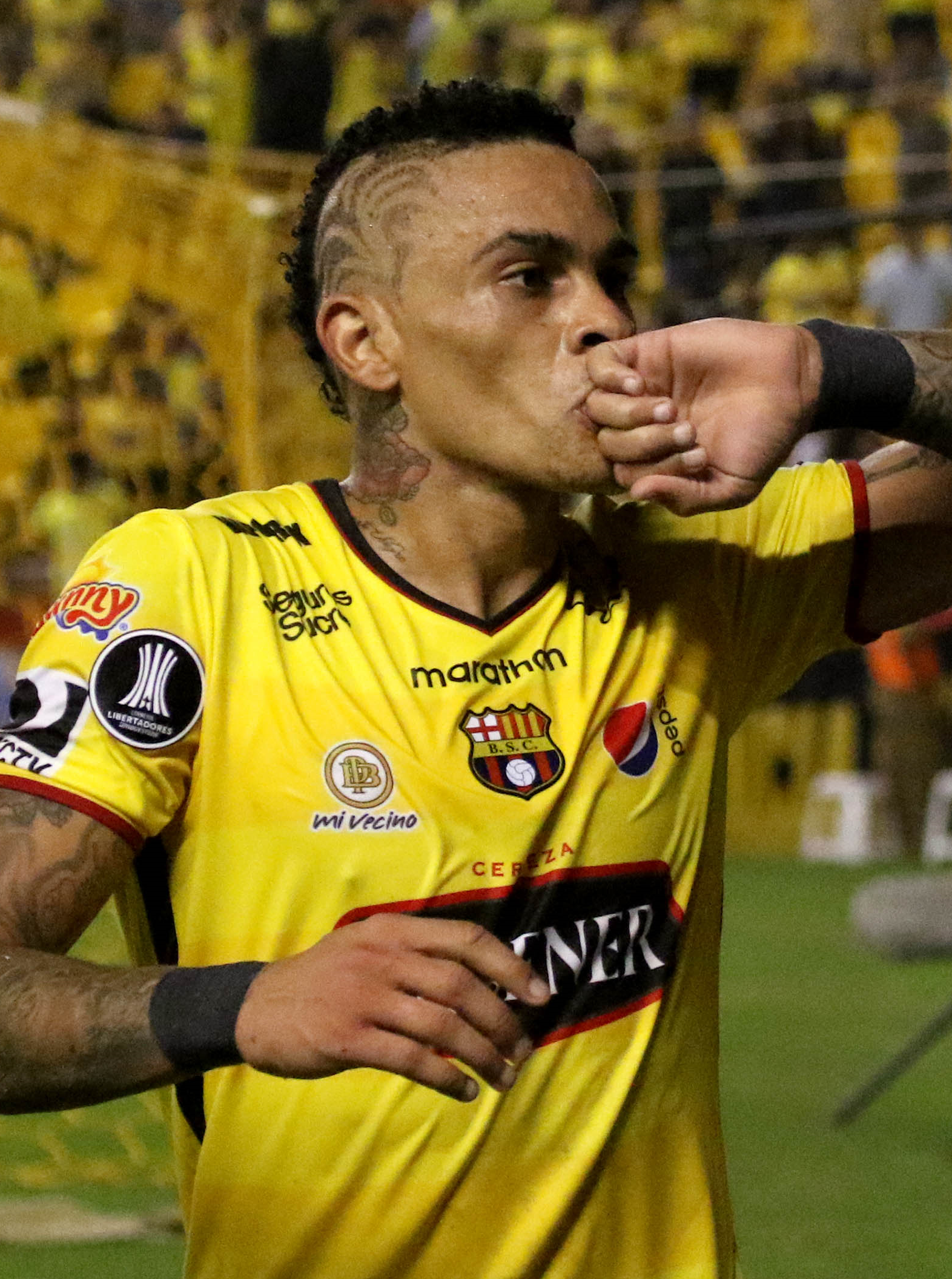
- Álvez with Barcelona SC in 2017

Personal information
- Full name: Jonathan Daniel Álvez Sagar
- Date of birth: 31 May 1988 (age 38)
- Place of birth: Vichadero, Uruguay
- Height: 1.83 m (6 ft 0 in)
- Position: Forward

Team information
- Current team: Naranja Mekánica
- Number: 44

Youth career
- Nacional
- 2006–2007: River Plate

Senior career*
Years	Team	Apps	(Gls)
2008–2009	Boston River		(3)
2009–2010	Coraceros	20	(13)
2010–2011	Platense	11	(9)
2011–2015	Torque	50	(44)
2013–2014	→ Danubio (loan)	28	(15)
2014–2015	→ Vitória Guimarães (loan)	20	(5)
2015	→ LDU Quito (loan)	23	(10)
2016–2018	Barcelona SC	88	(46)
2018–2019	Atlético Junior	22	(2)
2018–2019	→ Internacional (loan)	22	(6)
2019–2021	Barcelona SC	31	(9)
2021–2021	Atlético Nacional	32	(5)
2022	Unión Santa Fe	19	(5)
2023	Danubio	5	(0)
2023–2024	Naranja Mekánica		
2024	Brasiliense	0	(0)
2024–2025	Naranja Mekánica	0	(0)
2025–2026	Cerrito	24	(3)
2026–	Italiano	0	(0)
- * Club domestic league appearances and goals as of 10 March 2026

Jonathan Daniel Álvez Sagar (born 31 May 1988) is a Uruguayan footballer who plays as a forward for Primera Divisional C club Italiano.

== Club career ==
=== Uruguay ===
Born in Vichadero, Álvez came up from River Plate's youth system, but failed to appear as a senior with the first team. In 2008, he moved to Segunda División side Boston River, scoring his first senior goal on 29 November of that year in a 1–0 home win against Rocha.

In September 2009, Álvez joined Coraceros Polo Club in the Segunda División Amateur, and scored 13 goals for the side; highlights included a hat-trick in a 3–1 away win against Albion. He subsequently signed for fellow league team Platense, contributing with nine goals and narrowly missing out promotion.

In 2011, Álvez agreed to a deal with Torque, still in the third division. He achieved promotion to the second level in his first season as champions (also scoring the winner in the final against Canadian SC), and scored a 17 goals as his side missed out a consecutive promotion in the play-offs.

In February 2012, Álvez moved to Toluca with Torque teammate Nicolás Milesi on a trial basis, but nothing came of it. On 19 June 2013, he agreed to a one-year loan deal with Danubio.

Álvez made his Primera División debut on 18 August 2013, starting in a 0–0 away draw against Cerro Largo. On 14 September he scored his first goal in the category, netting the first in a 2–0 home win against Nacional.

Álvez scored 15 goals for Danubio during his spell, including two braces against Fénix and one against Racing Montevideo.

==== Vitória Guimarães (loan) ====
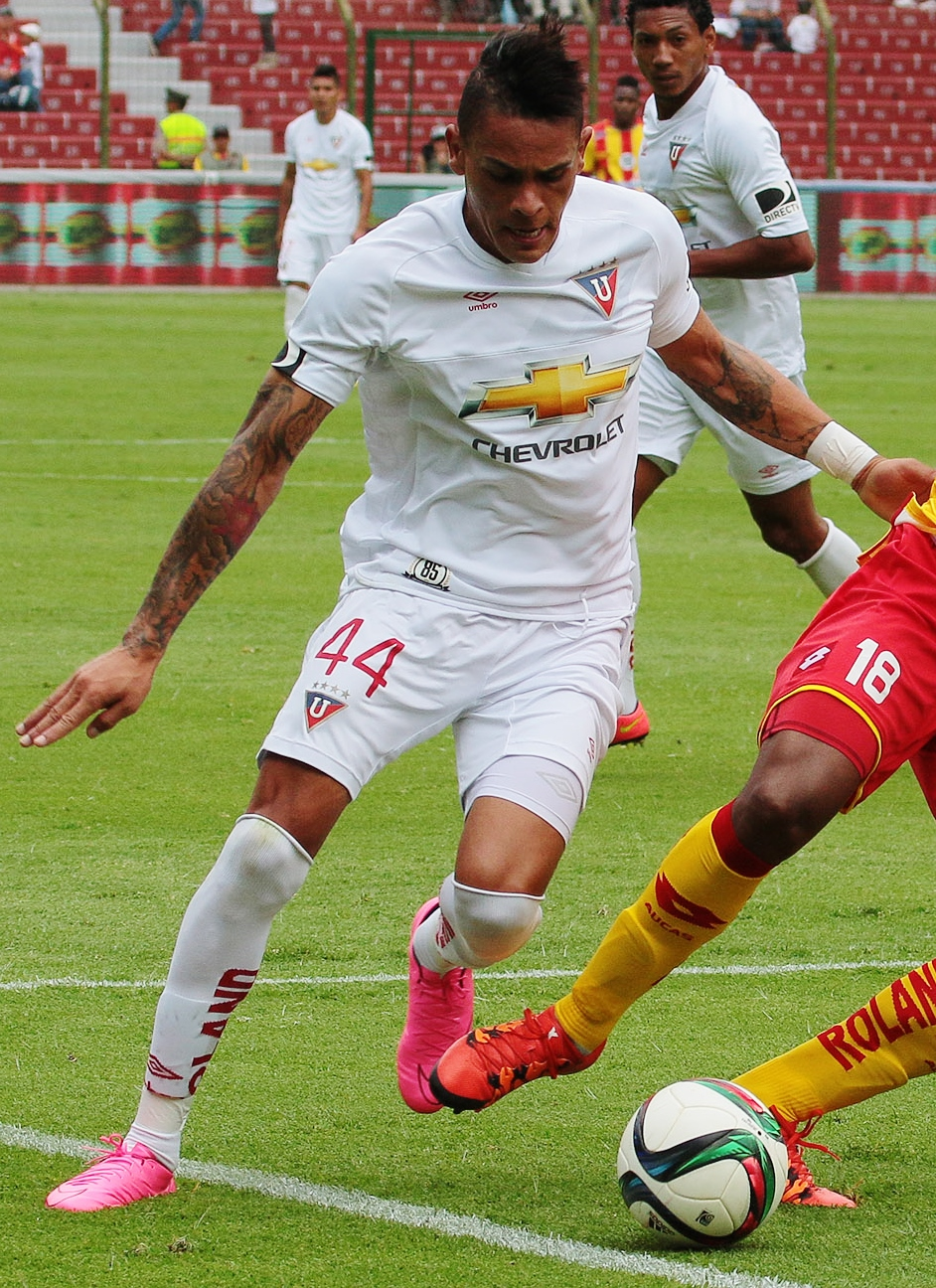
Álvez in action for LDU Quito in 2015

On 16 August 2014, Álvez moved abroad for the first time in his career, signing a one-year loan deal with Primeira Liga side Vitória Guimarães. He made his debut on 30 August, replacing Tomané in a 3–0 away win against Belenenses.

Álvez scored his first goal abroad on 19 September 2014, netting the equalizer in a 1–1 home draw against Paços de Ferreira. On 3 October, he scored a brace in a 3–0 home win against Boavista.

Álvez scored five goals for Vitória, but left the club in June 2015 after failing to agree new terms.

=== Ecuador ===
On 26 July 2015, Álvez signed for LDU Quito until the end of the year. He scored ten goals for the side in only 18 matches, as his side finished second after losing the finals to Emelec.

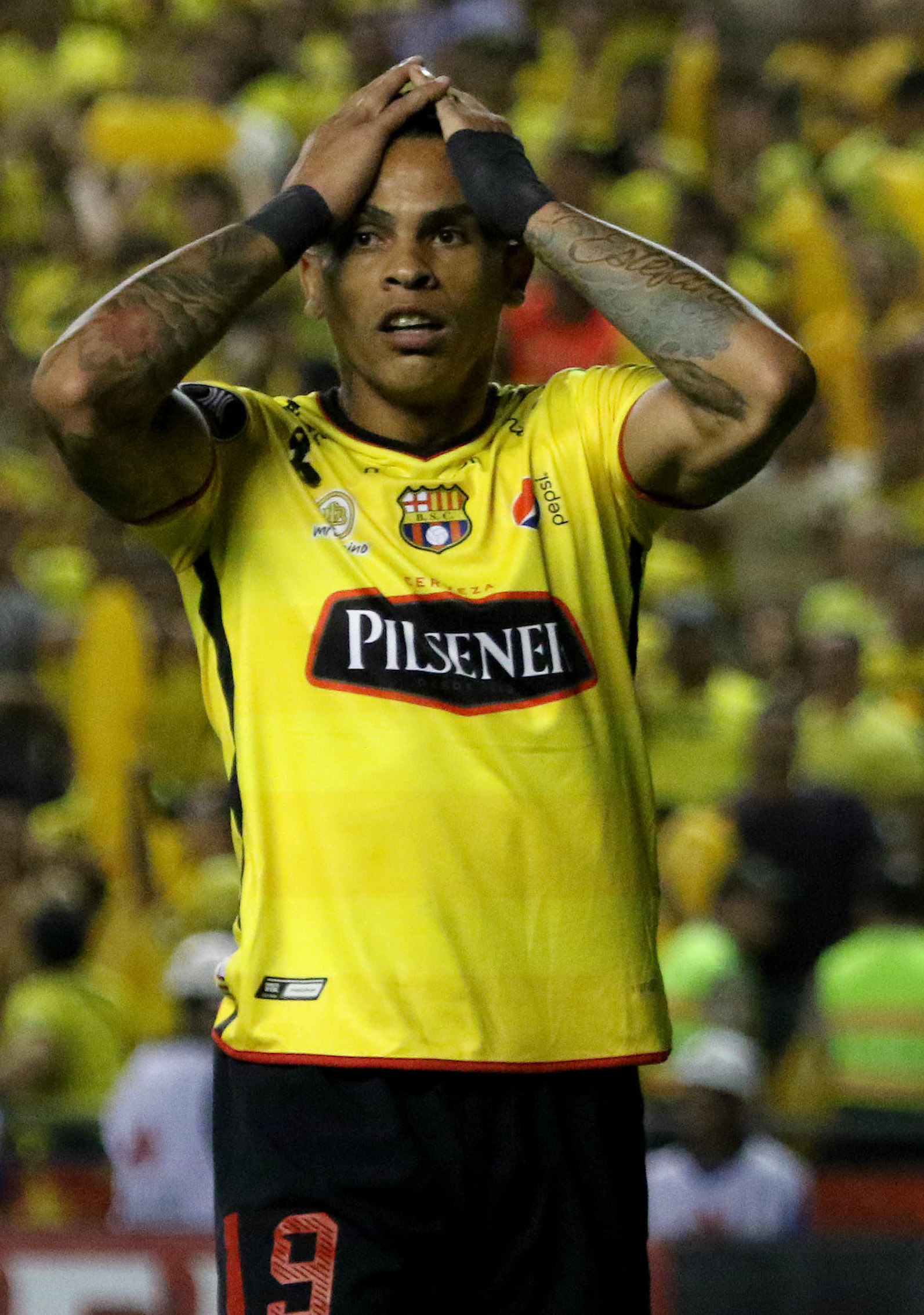
Álvez with Barcelona SC in 2017

On 10 February 2016, Álvez was presented at Barcelona SC after agreeing to a four-year deal. In his first season, he scored 19 goals as his side was crowned champions.

On 22 September 2023, Álvez joined Segunda Categoría club Naranja Mekánica. In April 2024, he moved to Brasiliense in Brazil, however, he returned to Naranja Mekánica in June without making any appearances for Brasiliense.

== Career statistics ==
As of 9 December 2017

Club	Season	League			Cup		Continental		Other		Total	
Club	Season	Division	Apps	Goals	Apps	Goals	Apps	Goals	Apps	Goals	Apps	Goals
Coraceros	2009–10	Segunda División Amateur	20	13	—		—		—		20	13
Platense	2010–11	Segunda División Amateur	11	9	—		—		—		11	9
Torque	2011–12	Segunda División Amateur	24	27	—		—		—		24	27
Torque	2012–13	Segunda División	26	17	—		—		—		26	17
Torque	Total		50	44	—		—		—		50	44
Danubio	2013–14	Primera División	28	15	—		—		—		28	15
Vitória Guimarães	2014–15	Primeira Liga	18	5	1	0	—		1 (Note: Appearance(s) in Taça da Liga)	0	20	5
LDU Quito	2015	Serie A	18	10	—		5 (Note: Appearance(s) in Copa Sudamericana)	0	—		23	10
Barcelona SC	2016	Serie A	38	19	—		1	0	—		39	19
Barcelona SC	2017	Serie A	39	20	—		10 (Note: Appearance(s) in Copa Libertadores)	6	—		48	26
Barcelona SC	Total		77	39	—		11	6	—		88	45
Career total			222	135	1	0	16	6	1	0	240	141

== Honours ==
Torque

- Uruguayan Segunda División Amateur: 2011–12

Danubio

- Uruguayan Primera División: 2013–14

Barcelona

- Ecuadorian Serie A: 2016, 2020

Atlético Nacional

- Copa Colombia: 2021
