= Jairo Padilla =

Ecuadorian footballer (born 1991)

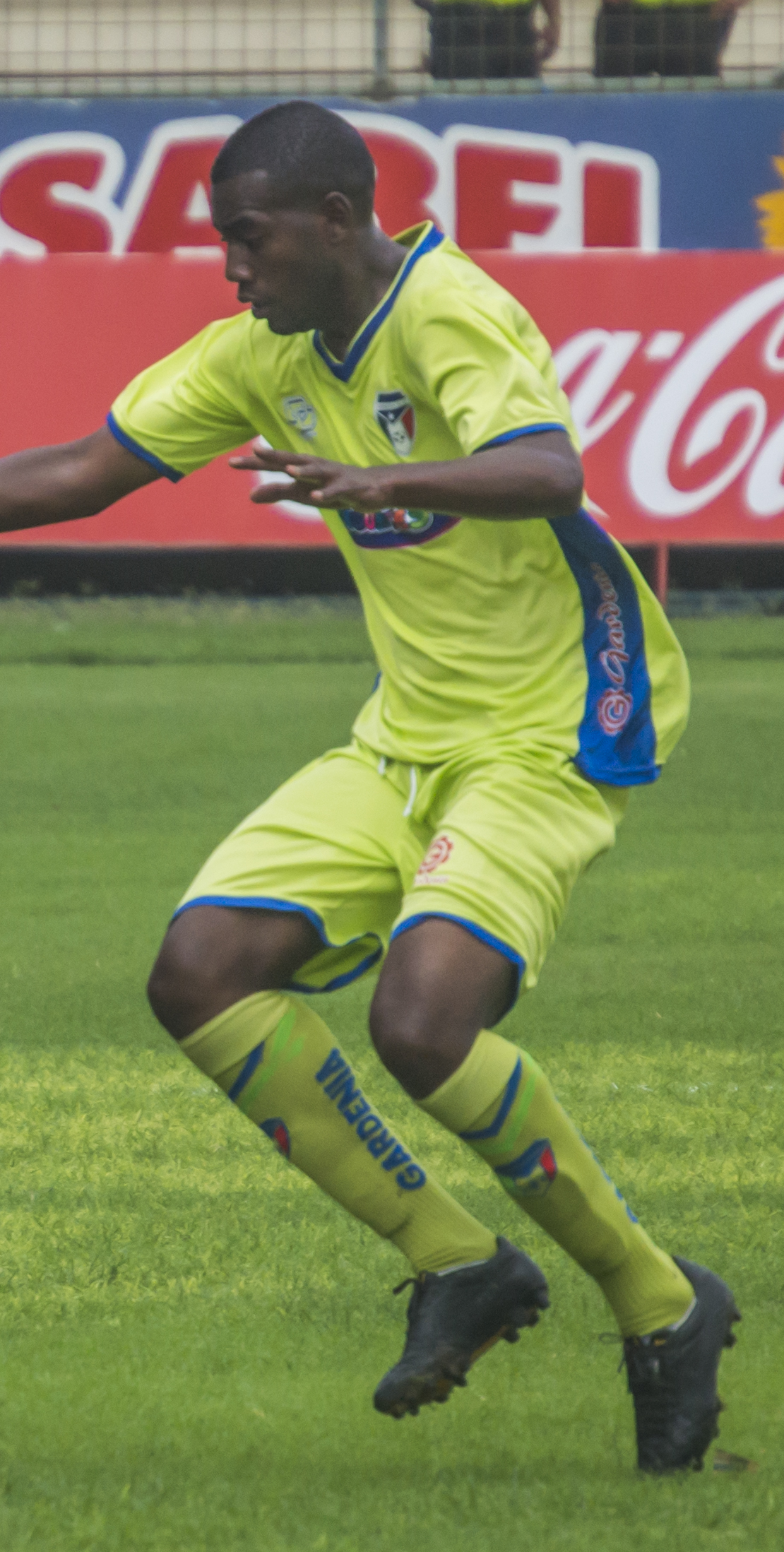
- Padilla in 2015

Personal information
- Full name: Jairo Santiago Padilla Folleco
- Date of birth: 10 May 1991 (age 35)
- Place of birth: Ibarra, Ecuador
- Position: Forward

Team information
- Current team: El Nacional
- Number: 9

Youth career
- 2008–2012: Aucas

Senior career*
Years	Team	Apps	(Gls)
2013	Aucas	22	(9)
2013–2014	Trofense	17	(1)
2014–2015	Aucas	74	(10)
2016–2017	LDU Quito	21	(0)
2017–2018	Macará	11	(0)
2019–	El Nacional	12	(0)
- * Club domestic league appearances and goals as of 13:55, 21 May 2019 (UTC)

Jairo Santiago Padilla Folleco (born 10 May 1991) is an Ecuadorian footballer who plays as a forward for El Nacional.

== Honors ==
Aucas

- Serie B: 2014
