= Exequiel Benavídez =

Argentine footballer

Personal information
- Full name: Exequiel Emanuel Benavídez
- Date of birth: March 5, 1989 (age 37)
- Place of birth: Santiago del Estero, Argentina
- Height: 1.74 m (5 ft 9 in)
- Position: Defensive midfielder

Team information
- Current team: Chacarita Juniors

Youth career
- Boca Juniors

Senior career*
| Years | Team | Apps | (Gls) |
| 2008–2013 | Boca Juniors | 11 | (0) |
| 2009–2010 | → Tiro Federal (loan) | 10 | (0) |
| 2013–2014 | All Boys | 16 | (0) |
| 2014–2015 | Deportes Iquique | 22 | (1) |
| 2015 | Nueva Chicago | 6 | (0) |
| 2015 | Atlético San Luis | 6 | (0) |
| 2016 | LDU Quito | 20 | (0) |
| 2017 | Sud América | 4 | (0) |
| 2017 | Mitre | 0 | (0) |
| 2018–2020 | Patriotas Boyacá | 59 | (0) |
| 2021 | LDU Portoviejo | | |
| 2022– | Chacarita Juniors | 2 | (0) |

International career
| 2009 | Argentina U-20 | 7 | (1) |
- * Club domestic league appearances and goals as of 16:17, 11 July 2022 (UTC)

Exequiel Emanuel Benavídez (born 5 March 1989, in Santiago del Estero, Argentina), is an Argentine footballer who plays as a defensive midfielder for Chacarita Juniors.

== Career ==
Exequiel was signed in 2008 from the Youth Divisions of Boca Juniors and debuted in a 3–1 win against Arsenal.

In 2009, he was selected for the Argentina Sub-20 team to participate in the 2009 South American Youth Championship, the qualification tournament for the 2009 FIFA U-20 World Cup, where Argentina missed out on qualification for the World Cup by finishing bottom of their group in the second round of the competition.
