= Pomasqui =

Coordinates: 0.05°S 78.45°W

Pomasqui is a village in Quito Canton, Ecuador. Located 16 kilometres (9.9 mi) north of Quito, and 6 kilometres (3.7 mi) from the equator, it is on the road to Ciudad Mitad del Mundo. The village's main plaza, Plaza Yerovi, features two churches, the Church of El Senor del Arbol ("the Lord of the Tree"), as well as the parish church, which contains some religious paintings which are considered odd. Santa Clara is the patron saint of Pomasqui. Dia de Santa Clara and the fiesta of El Senor del Arbol are both celebrated in July. The economy features a shoe industry, which uses parts of the maguey plant found in the region. The climate is so dry as to have given it the name of Piurita ("little Piura"). The southern boundary of the Cara culture, extended to Pomasqui.
