= Luis Romero (footballer, born 1984) =

Ecuadorian footballer

Personal information
- Full name: Luis Manuel Romero Véliz
- Date of birth: 15 May 1984 (age 42)
- Place of birth: Chone, Ecuador
- Height: 1.82 m (6 ft 0 in)
- Position: Defender

Team information
- Current team: Aucas
- Number: 27

Senior career*
Years	Team	Apps	(Gls)
2004–2006	UDJ	21	(8)
2007–2009	Grecia	54	(7)
2010–2011	Manta	66	(4)
2012–2014	Deportivo Quito	79	(3)
2014	L.D.U. Portoviejo	16	(2)
2015–2016	L.D.U. Quito	71	(2)
2017	Guayaquil City	28	(1)
2018–2019,2022–	Aucas	20	(1)
2020–2021	Mushuc Runa	5	(0)
- * Club domestic league appearances and goals as of July 9, 2018

Luis Romero Véliz (born 15 May 1984) is an Ecuadorian footballer who plays as a defender for S.D. Aucas.
