= Miller Castillo =

Ecuadorian footballer (born 1987)

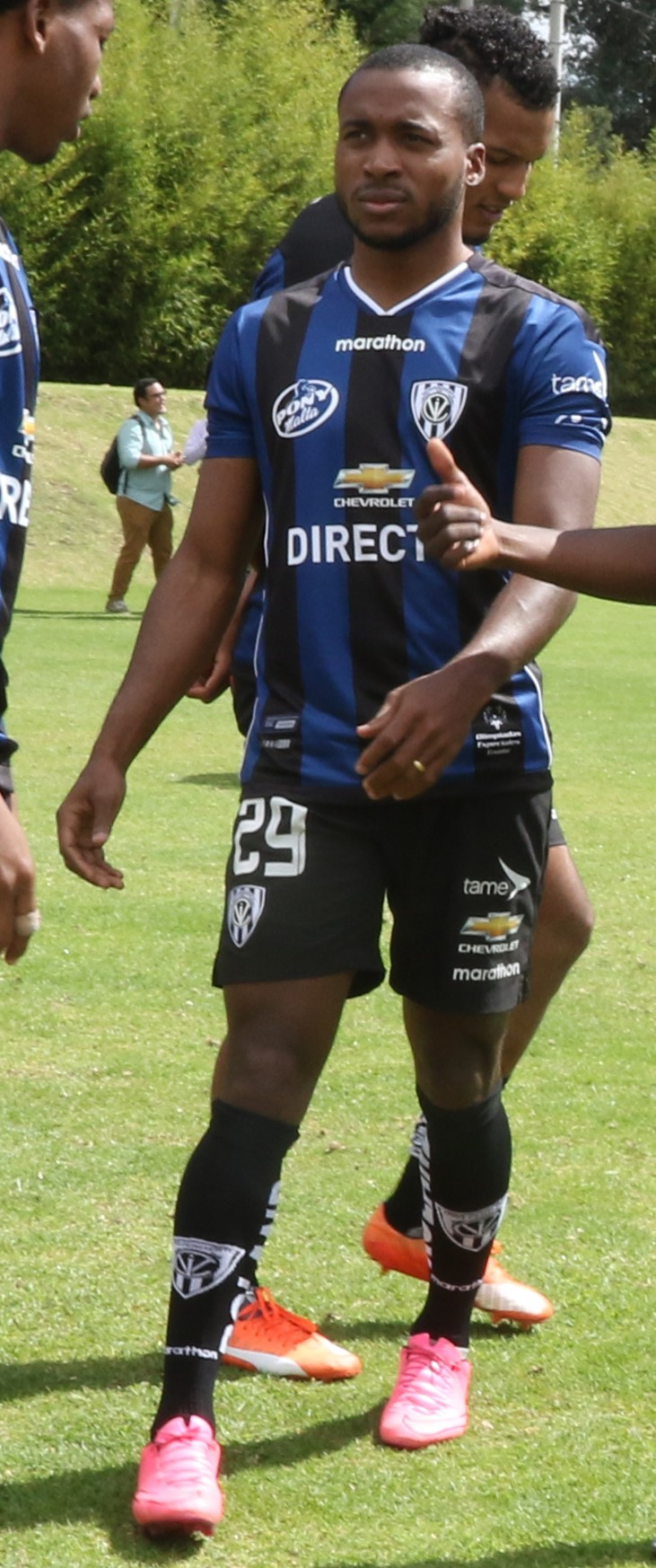
- Castillo at Independiente del Valle.

Personal information
- Full name: Miller David Castillo Quiñónez
- Date of birth: 28 September 1994 (age 32)
- Place of birth: Atacames, Ecuador
- Height: 1.77 m (5 ft 10 in)
- Position: Forward

Senior career*
Years	Team	Apps	(Gls)
2008–2009	Atlético Mexiquense	14	(0)
2010–2012	Lobos BUAP	54	(15)
2012–2013	Deportivo Cuenca	27	(4)
2013	Técnico Universitario		(8)
2014	Manta	36	(11)
2015	L.D.U. Quito	27	(4)
2016	Independiente del Valle	29	(4)
2017	Alebrijes de Oaxaca	5	(1)
2017–2018	Guayaquil City	23	(2)
2018	Orense		(4)
2019	Gualaceo		(4)
2020–2021	Mushuc Runa	13	(0)
2022	Búhos ULVR		(2)
- * Club domestic league appearances and goals

Miler David Castillo Quiñónez (born 1 August 1987) is an Ecuadorian professional footballer.
