= Juan Cavallaro =

Argentine footballer

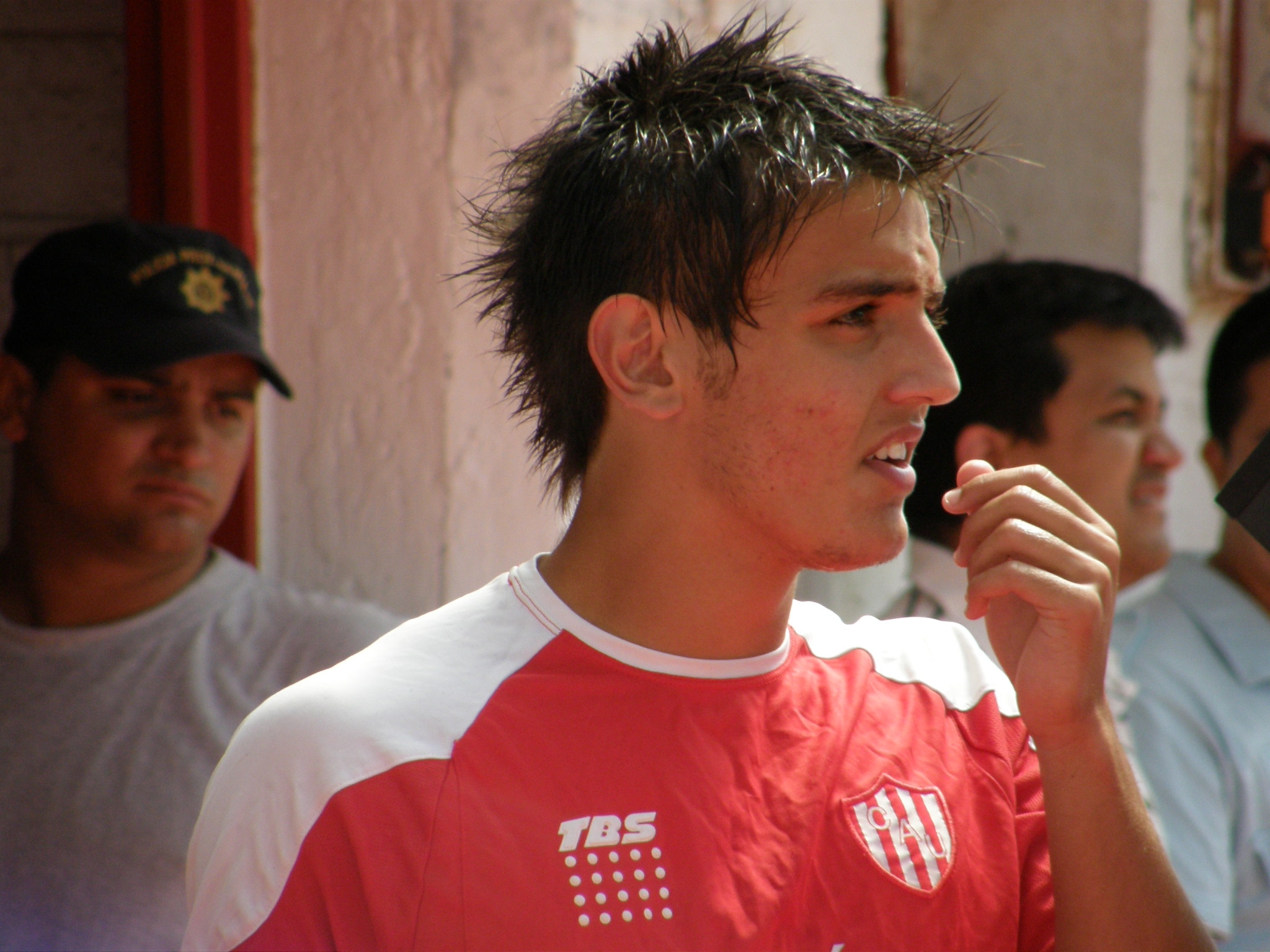
- Cavallaro with Unión Santa Fe in 2009

Personal information
- Full name: Juan Ignacio Cavallaro
- Date of birth: 28 June 1994 (age 32)
- Place of birth: Paraná, Argentina
- Height: 1.71 m (5 ft 7 in)
- Position: Winger

Team information
- Current team: Delfín

Youth career
- Unión Santa Fe

Senior career*
Years	Team	Apps	(Gls)
2012–2013	Unión Santa Fe	32	(3)
2013–2018	San Lorenzo	25	(2)
2015	→ LDU Quito (loan)	19	(1)
2016–2017	→ Estudiantes (loan)	31	(4)
2018–2019	Tigre	17	(3)
2019	Unión Santa Fe	11	(1)
2020–2021	Tigre	15	(0)
2021–2023	La Serena	31	(6)
2023–2024	Arsenal Sarandí	10	(1)
2024–2025	Independiente Rivadavia	13	(1)
2025–2026	San Martín SJ	19	(0)
2026–	Delfín	0	(0)

International career
2012	Argentina U20	2	(0)
- * Club domestic league appearances and goals as of 16:17, 8 March 2026 (UTC)

Juan Ignacio Cavallaro (born 28 June 1994) is an Argentine footballer who plays as a winger for LigaPro Serie A club Delfín.

== Honours ==
San Lorenzo

- Argentine Primera División: 2013 Inicial
- Copa Libertadores: 2014
