= Diego Morales (footballer, born 1986) =

Argentine footballer

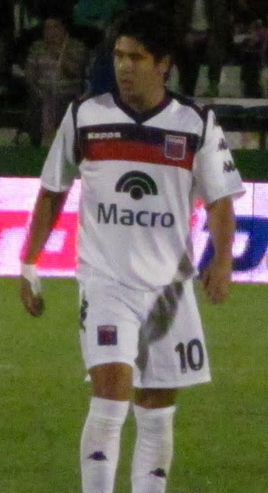

Personal information
- Full name: Diego Alberto Morales
- Date of birth: November 29, 1986 (age 39)
- Place of birth: Villa María, Córdoba, Argentina
- Height: 1.72 m (5 ft 8 in)
- Position: Attacking midfielder

Team information
- Current team: Cantolao
- Number: 10

Senior career*
Years	Team	Apps	(Gls)
2009–2010	Chacarita Juniors	29	(3)
2010–2012	Tigre	72	(15)
2012–2013	Al-Ahli	6	(2)
2013	Náutico	17	(0)
2014–2016	LDU Quito	83	(17)
2016–2017	Tigre	24	(3)
2017–2018	Colón	7	(0)
2018–2021	Tigre	54	(8)
2022–	Cantolao	9	(0)

International career
2011	Argentina	1	(0)
- * Club domestic league appearances and goals as of 22:11, 13 May 2022 (UTC)

Diego Alberto Morales (born November 29, 1986, in Villa María, Córdoba) is an Argentine football striker playing for Cantolao.
