= Jonny Uchuari =

Ecuadorian footballer (born 1994)

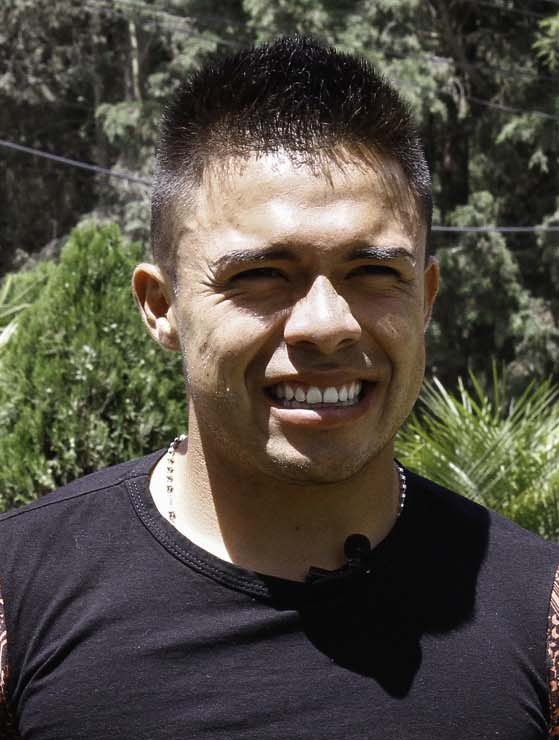

Personal information
- Full name: Jonny Alexander Uchuari Pintado
- Date of birth: 19 January 1994 (age 32)
- Place of birth: Loja, Ecuador
- Height: 1.62 m (5 ft 4 in)
- Position: Winger

Team information
- Current team: Cuenca Juniors

Youth career
- 2007–2009: L.D.U. Loja

Senior career*
Years	Team	Apps	(Gls)
2009–2014	L.D.U. Loja	183	(25)
2015–2016	L.D.U. Quito	7	(0)
2016–2017	Independiente DV	42	(6)
2017–2019	Deportivo Cuenca	63	(14)
2018	→ C.D. El Nacional (loan)	26	(2)
2020–2021	Macará	26	(4)
2021–2022	Orense	26	(3)
2022–	Mushuc Runa	10	(1)
2022–2023	→ Morelia (loan)	44	(9)
2024	Libertad	12	(0)
2024	Amazonas	4	(0)
2025–2026	Aucas	4	(0)
2026–	Cuenca Juniors	0	(0)

International career^{‡}
2014–	Ecuador	2	(0)
- * Club domestic league appearances and goals as of 15 March 2026 ‡ National team caps and goals as of 10 October 2017

Jonny Alexander Uchuari Pintado (born 19 January 1994) is an Ecuadorian footballer who plays for Ecuadorian Serie B club Cuenca Juniors.

== Career ==
=== LDU Loja ===
Uchuari is a youth exponent from L.D.U. Loja. He made his debut for L.D.U. Loja in Ecuadorian Serie A at 22 May 2011 in a 1–2 away win against Deportivo Cuenca. He scored his first league goal at 14 August 2011 against Independiente del Valle.

=== LDU Quito ===
Uchuari joined Quito side, L.D.U. Quito on 23 December 2014, for One year.

== International career ==
Uchuari was called for Friendlies against United States and El Salvador on October 10 and 14th, 2014 respectively. Uchuari made his debut for Ecuador against El Salvador, coming in as a sub for Jonathan González.

== Honours ==
L.D.U. Loja

- Ecuadorian Serie B: 2010

Independiente DV

- Copa Libertadores Runner Up: 2016
