= Marathon Sports =

Ecuadorian sporting goods manufacturer

- Type: Private
- Industry: Textile
- Founded: 1981; 45 years ago
- Founder: Rodrigo Rivadeneira
- Headquarters: Quito, Ecuador
- Area served: South America
- Products: Football kit uniforms
- Website: marathon.ec

Marathon Sports is an Ecuadorian sports equipment manufacturing company headquartered in Quito. It was founded in May 1981 by Rodrigo Ribadeneira when he opened his first store.

The company manufactures and distributes athletic sportswear to sports teams and athletes, mainly association football uniforms. In addition to its own products, Marathon imports, distributes, and markets global brands of clothing and accessories, such as Adidas, Nike, Puma, Diadora, Wilson, and Joma. There are currently 88 Marathon Sports-owned stores in Ecuador.

== History ==
The company was founded in May 1981 by Rodrigo Rivadeneira. It began as a sporting store chain in Ecuador until 1994, when the Reebok contract with Ecuador national football team was set to expire. Marathon Sports subsequently entered into a sponsorship agreement with the Ecuadorian Football Federation; the duration of the initial contract was not publicly disclosed. This was later renewed in 2016 for a total of US$ 2.6 million, expiring in 2023. The first national squad jersey design had a band of thick blue and red stripes on the right shoulder reflecting the flag of Ecuador. After an unsuccessful qualifying campaign for the FIFA World Cup in 1998, the Ecuadorian Federation decided to stick with the brand.

In 2002, Ecuador qualified for its first FIFA World Cup in South Korea and Japan. Marathon Sports has established a presence outside of Ecuador, supplying Deportivo Municipal of Peru and Rampla Juniors of Uruguay. Marathon also operates stores in Peru.

In 2017, the company signed a contract with the Peruvian Football Federation to become official shirt supplier of Peru national team since 2018 for a total of US$ 1.5 million – plus 8 million in sporting goods. The offer largely beat the Adidas bid, which showed interest in the Peruvian team.

== Sponsorships ==
The following list of clubs are sponsored by Diadora:

=== Association football ===
==== Confederations ====
- (Mercosur) CONMEBOL

==== National teams ====
- Ecuador
- Bolivia
- Chile (since 2027)

==== Clubs teams ====
- (Ecuador) Barcelona SC
- (Ecuador) Independiente del Valle
- (Bolivia) The Strongest
- (Chile) Huachipato
- (Chile) Unión Española
- (Peru) Universitario de Deportes

=== Rugby ===
==== National teams ====
- Chile

==== Clubs teams ====
- (Chile) Selknam
