= 2015 Campeonato Ecuatoriano de Fútbol Serie A =

Copa Pilsener Serie A
- Season: 2015
- Champions: Emelec (13th title)
- Relegated: LDU Loja; Deportivo Quito
- 2016 Copa Libertadores: Emelec; LDU Quito; Independiente del Valle
- 2016 Copa Sudamericana: Emelec; Barcelona; Universidad Católica; Aucas
- Top goalscorer: Miller Bolaños (25 Goals)
- Biggest home win: Barcelona 6–0 Mushuc Runa (March 25); Emelec 6-0 Deportivo Cuenca (November 6)
- Biggest away win: Deportivo Quito 0-5 Independiente del Valle (December 2)
- Highest scoring: Emelec 5–2 Mushuc Runa (February 7); LDU Loja 2–5 Aucas (May 22)

The 2015 Campeonato Ecuatoriano de Fútbol de la Serie A (officially known as the Copa Pilsener Serie A for sponsorship reasons) was the 57th season of the Serie A, Ecuador's premier football league.

Emelec successfully defended their title, winning their third consecutive championship and 13th overall.

== Teams ==
Twelve teams competed in the 2015 Serie A season, ten of which remained from the previous season. Manta and Olmedo were relegated from the Serie A after finishing with the fewest points in the 2014 season. They were replaced by Aucas and River Plate, the 2014 Serie B winner and runner-up, respectively. Aucas made their 35th top-flight appearance and returned to Serie A for the first time since 2006, while River Ecuador made their debut in the top division.

=== Stadia and locations ===
Locations of the 2015 Serie A teams.

Team	Home city	Stadium
Aucas	Quito	Gonzalo Pozo Ripalda
Barcelona	Guayaquil	Monumental Banco Pichincha
Deportivo Cuenca	Cuenca	Alejandro Serrano Aguilar
Deportivo Quito	Quito	Olímpico Atahualpa
El Nacional	Quito	Olímpico Atahualpa
Emelec	Guayaquil	Estadio George Capwell
Independiente del Valle	Sangolquí	Rumiñahui
LDU Loja	Loja	Federativo Reina del Cisne
LDU Quito	Quito	Casa Blanca
Mushuc Runa	Ambato	Bellavista
River Ecuador	Guayaquil	Christian Benítez Betancourt
Universidad Católica	Quito	Olímpico Atahualpa

=== Personnel and kits ===
Team	Manager	Kit manufacturer	Sponsors
Aucas	Carlos Ischia	Lotto	Cooperativa de Ahorro y Crédito Andalucía Ltda.
Barcelona	Guillermo Almada	Marathon	Pilsener
Deportivo Cuenca	Álex Aguinaga	Marathon	Pilsener
Deportivo Quito	Carlos Sevilla	Fila	Panadería y Pastelería La Unión
El Nacional	Eduardo Favaro	Lotto	Pilsener
Emelec	Omar De Felippe	New Balance	Pilsener
Independiente del Valle	Pablo Repetto	Marathon	DirecTV
LDU Loja	Geovanny Cumbicus	Astro	Industria Lojana de Especerías C.A.
LDU Quito	Luis Zubeldía	Umbro	Chevrolet
Mushuc Runa	Sixto Vizuete	Aurik	Cooperativa de Ahorro y Crédito Mushuc Runa
River Plate	Marcelo Trobbiani	Astro	Radio Caravana
Universidad Católica	Jorge Célico	Astro	Discover Card

== First stage ==
The first stage began on January 31 and ended on July 12.

Pos	Team	Pld	W	D	L	GF	GA	GD	Pts	Qualification
1	LDU Quito	22	13	8	1	28	10	+18	47	Finals and 2016 Copa Libertadores Second Stage
2	Emelec	22	13	6	3	41	18	+23	45	
3	Independiente del Valle	22	12	6	4	35	24	+11	42	
4	Barcelona	22	10	3	9	33	24	+9	33	
5	Deportivo Quito	22	7	8	7	33	37	−4	29	
6	El Nacional	22	8	4	10	28	24	+4	28	
7	River Plate	22	7	5	10	27	32	−5	26	
8	Mushuc Runa	22	7	5	10	25	38	−13	26	
9	Deportivo Cuenca	22	5	8	9	25	37	−12	23	
10	Aucas	22	5	7	10	32	34	−2	22	
11	Universidad Católica	22	5	6	11	22	31	−9	21	
12	LDU Loja	22	5	4	13	17	37	−20	19	

== Second stage ==
The second stage began on July 17 and ended on December 13.

Pos	Team	Pld	W	D	L	GF	GA	GD	Pts	Qualification
1	Emelec	22	12	7	3	42	20	+22	43	Finals and 2016 Copa Libertadores Second Stage
2	LDU Quito	22	13	3	6	42	26	+16	42	
3	Universidad Católica	22	12	4	6	35	27	+8	40	
4	Independiente del Valle	22	11	4	7	45	30	+15	37	
5	Aucas	22	8	8	6	27	25	+2	32	
6	Barcelona	22	8	7	7	23	21	+2	31	
7	River Plate	22	7	7	8	26	30	−4	28	
8	LDU Loja	22	8	3	11	28	33	−5	27	
9	Deportivo Cuenca	22	6	7	9	21	27	−6	25	
10	Mushuc Runa	22	5	9	8	26	33	−7	24	
11	El Nacional	22	6	3	13	17	34	−17	21	
12	Deportivo Quito	22	3	4	15	15	41	−26	13	

== Finals ==
December 16, 2015
19:15

Emelec	3–1	LDU Quito

December 20, 2015
11:30

LDU Quito	0-0	Emelec

== Aggregate table ==
Pos	Team	Pld	W	D	L	GF	GA	GD	Pts	Qualification or relegation
1	LDU Quito	44	26	11	7	70	36	+34	89	Copa Libertadores second stage
2	Emelec	44	25	13	6	83	38	+45	88	Copa Libertadores second stage
3	Independiente del Valle	44	23	10	11	80	54	+26	79	Copa Libertadores first stage
4	Barcelona	44	18	10	16	56	45	+11	64	Copa Sudamericana first stage
5	Universidad Católica	44	17	10	17	57	58	−1	61	Copa Sudamericana first stage
6	Aucas	44	13	15	16	59	59	0	54	Copa Sudamericana first stage
7	River Plate	44	14	12	18	53	62	−9	54	
8	Mushuc Runa	44	12	14	18	51	71	−20	50	
9	El Nacional	44	14	7	23	45	58	−13	49	
10	Deportivo Cuenca	44	11	15	18	46	64	−18	48	
11	LDU Loja	44	13	7	24	45	70	−25	46	Serie B
12	Deportivo Quito	44	10	12	22	48	78	−30	42	Serie B

Updated to match(es) played on unknown. Source:

== Top goalscorers ==
Rank	Player	Nationality	Club	Goals
1	Miller Bolaños	ECU	Emelec	25
2	Daniel Neculman	ARG	River Plate	22
3	Leonel Vides	ARG	Universidad Católica	15
4	Narciso Mina	ECU	LDU Quito	14
4	José Angulo	ECU	Independiente del Valle	14
4	Ismael Blanco	ARG	Barcelona	14
