= 2025 Liga Deportiva Universitaria de Quito season =

L.D.U. Quito
2025 season
- President: Isaac Álvarez
- Manager: Pablo Sánchez
- Stadium: Estadio Rodrigo Paz Delgado
- CONMEBOL Libertadores: Semi-finals
- Supercopa Ecuador: Champions (3rd title)
- Top goalscorer: League: Michael Estrada (8 goals); All: Michael Estrada (11 goals)
- Average home league attendance: 11,319
Home colours	Away colours	Third colours

Liga Deportiva Universitaria de Quito's 2025 season was the club's 95th year of existence, the 72nd year in professional football, and the 64th in the top level of professional football in Ecuador.

== Club ==
=== Personnel ===
President: Isaac Álvarez
Sporting manager: Eduardo Álvarez

=== Coaching staff ===
Manager: Pablo Sánchez
Assistant manager: Leandro Martín, Adrián Gabbarini
Physical trainer: Cristian Mincheli
Goalkeeper trainer: Luis Preti

=== Kits ===
Supplier: Puma
Sponsor(s): Banco Pichincha, Discover, Ecuabet, Splendor, Terrawind Global Protection, Seguros Constitución

== Squad information ==
Num	Pos	Nat.	Player	Age	Since	App	Goals	Notes
1	GK	ECU	Gonzalo Valle	28	2024	6	0	
2	DF	ECU	Yeltzin Erique	21	2025	1	0	Previously with the club in '23
3	DF	ECU	Richard Mina	25	2023	34	0	
4	DF	HAI	Ricardo Adé	34	2023	80	2	
5	MF	ECU	Kevin Minda	26	2025	9	1	Previously with the club from '18–'19
6	DF	ECU	Darío Aimar	29	2025	0	0	
7	MF	CHI	Lautaro Pastrán	22	2025	0	0	
8	MF	ECU	Carlos Gruezo	29	2025	0	0	
9	FW	ARG	Lisandro Alzugaray	34	2023	54	11	
10	MF	ECU	Alexander Alvarado	25	2025	68	20	Previously with the club from '22–'24
11	FW	ECU	Michael Estrada	28	2024	34	4	
12	GK	ECU	Alexis Villa	23	2025	0	0	
14	DF	ECU	José Quintero	34	2015	268	24	
15	MF	BOL	Gabriel Villamil	23	2024	24	4	
17	MF	ECU	Darío Mina	26	2024	5	0	
19	FW	PAR	Álex Arce	29	2024	31	28	
20	MF	CHI	Fernando Cornejo	29	2024	17	3	
21	MF	ECU	Ederson Castillo	16	2024	1	0	
22	GK	ECU	Alexander Domínguez	37	2022	362	0	Previously with the club from '06–'16
24	FW	ECU	Alejandro Cabeza	27	2025	0	0	
29	DF	ECU	Bryan Ramírez	24	2023	51	3	
30	DF	URU	Gian Franco Allala	27	2024	8	0	
31	DF	ECU	Daniel de la Cruz	20	2024	12	0	
32	MF	ECU	Juan Sebastián Rodríguez	18	2024	7	0	
33	DF	ECU	Leonel Quiñónez	31	2023	53	1	

Note: Caps and goals are of the national league and are current as of the beginning of the season.

=== Winter transfers ===
Players In
Name	Nat	Pos	Age	Moving from
Alexis Villa	ECU	GK	23	Independiente Juniors (Ecuador)
Darío Aimar	ECU	DF	29	The Strongest (Bolivia)
Yeltzin Erique	ECU	DF	21	Orense (Ecuador) (Loan return)
Alexander Alvarado	ECU	MF	25	Universidad Católica (Ecuador) (Loan return)
Kevin Minda	ECU	MF	26	Universidad Católica (Ecuador)
Lautaro Pastrán	CHI	MF	22	Everton (Chile) (Loan)
Alejandro Cabeza	ECU	FW	27	El Nacional (Ecuador)

Players Out
Name	Nat	Pos	Age	Moving to
Ethan Minda	ECU	GK	19	Deportivo Cuenca (Ecuador)
Andrés Zanini	ARG	DF	27	Deportes La Serena (Chile)
Marco Angulo	ECU	MF	22	Deceased
Luis Estupiñán	ECU	MF	25	Deportivo Cuenca (Ecuador) (loan)
Jhojan Julio	ECU	MF	26	Club Tijuana (Mexico)
Madison Julio	ECU	MF	27	Técnico Universitario (Ecuador) (Loan)
Lucas Piovi	ARG	MF	33	Estudiantes de La Plata (Argentina)
Jairón Charcopa	ECU	FW	20	Técnico Universitario (Ecuador) (Loan)

== Competitions ==
Competition	Started round	Final position / round	First match	Last match
LigaPro	First Stage			
CONMEBOL Libertadores	Group Stage			
Supercopa Ecuador	Final	Champions	February 1	February 1
Copa Ecuador	—			

=== Pre-season friendlies ===
January 25 Noche Blanca	L.D.U. Quito	1–1	Alianza Lima	Quito
21:00 UTC−05:00	D. Mina 50'		Guerrero 42'	Stadium: Estadio Rodrigo Paz Delgado; Referee: Byron Moreno

=== LigaPro ===
The 2025 season will be Liga's 64th season in the Serie A and their 24th consecutive.

==== First stage ====
Results summary

Overall								Home						Away					
Pld	W	D	L	GF	GA	GD	Pts	W	D	L	GF	GA	GD	W	D	L	GF	GA	GD
0	0	0	0	0	0	0	0	0	0	0	0	0	0	0	0	0	0	0	0

Results by round

Round	1	2	3	4	5	6	7	8	9	10	11	12	13	14	15	16	17	18	19	20	21	22	23	24	25	26	27	28	29	30
Ground	-	-	-	-	-	-	-	-	-	-	-	-	-	-	-	-	-	-	-	-	-	-	-	-	-	-	-	-	-	-
Result																														
Position																														

Source: Competitive matches
A = Away; H = Home; W = Win; D = Draw; L = Loss

February 16 Round 1	L.D.U. Quito	0–0	Vinotinto	Quito
12:45 UTC−05:00	Gruezo (yellow card) 60'; Cabeza (yellow card) 90+5'; de la Cruz (red card) 90+8'	Report	Luis Gómez (yellow card) 43'; Aguirre (yellow card) 53'; Ariel Mina (yellow card) 71' (yellow-red card) 75'; Edison Hernández (yellow card) 90+3'	Stadium: Estadio Rodrigo Paz Delgado

February 22 Round 2	Independiente del Valle	1–1	L.D.U. Quito	Quito
19:00 UTC−05:00	Hoyos 22'; Carabajal (yellow card) 54'; Bryan García (yellow card) 82'; Fernández (yellow card) 86'; Schunke (yellow card) 90+4'	Report	Adé (yellow card) 17'; Gruezo (yellow card) 45+2'; Cornejo 62'	Stadium: Estadio Banco Guayaquil

March 2 Round 3	L.D.U. Quito	4–0	Orense	Quito
16:30	Carlos Gruezo (yellow card) 23'; Michael Estrada 61'; Bryan Ramírez (yellow card) 68'; Álex Arce 88'; Lisandro Alzugaray 90+3'; Gabriel Villamil 90+5'	Report	Walter Agustin Herrera (red card) 36'; Nazareno Romero (yellow card) 69'; Steeven Quiñónez (yellow card) 85'; Gabriel Achilier (yellow card) 87'	Stadium: Estadio Rodrigo Paz Delgado; Referee: (Ecuador) Yerson Zambrano

March 9 Round 4	L.D.U. Quito	3–0	Delfín	Quito
15:00	Alexander Alvarado (yellow card) 22'; Daniel de la Cruz 45+6'; Lisandro Alzugaray 71'; Bryan Ramírez (yellow card) 73'; Michael Estrada 87'	Report	Carlos Cuero (yellow card) 19'; Luis Castro (yellow card) 53'; Mateo Burdisso (yellow card) 81'	Stadium: Estadio Rodrigo Paz Delgado; Referee: (Ecuador) Augusto Aragón

March 16 Round 5	Emelec	1–0	L.D.U. Quito	Guayaquil
19:00	Castelli 28' (yellow card) 63'; Joao Quinonez (yellow card) 75'; Pedro Ortiz (yellow card) 88'	Report		Stadium: Estadio George Capwell; Referee: (Ecuador) Guillermo Guerrero

March 29 Round 6	Deportivo Cuenca	1–2	L.D.U. Quito	Cuenca
17:30	Mancinelli 33'; Stalin Morocho (yellow card) 88'; Brian Bustos (yellow card) 90+10'	Report	Gabriel Villamil 23'; Alejandro Cabeza 90+6'	Stadium: Estadio Alejandro Serrano Aguilar; Referee: (Ecuador) Oswaldo Contreras

April 6 Round 7	L.D.U. Quito	v	Barcelona SC	Quito
TBA				Stadium: Estadio Rodrigo Paz Delgado; Referee: TBA

April 13 Round 8	Mushuc Runa	v	L.D.U. Quito	Riobamba
TBA				Stadium: Estadio Olímpico de Riobamba; Referee: TBA

April 20 Round 9	L.D.U. Quito	v	Aucas	Quito
TBA				Stadium: Estadio Rodrigo Paz Delgado; Referee: TBA

April 27 Round 10	Manta	v	L.D.U. Quito	Manta
TBA				Stadium: Estadio Jocay; Referee: TBA

May 4 Round 11	L.D.U. Quito	v	El Nacional	Quito
TBA				Stadium: Estadio Rodrigo Paz Delgado; Referee: TBA

May 11 Round 12	Macará	v	L.D.U. Quito	Ambato
TBA				Stadium: Estadio Bellavista; Referee: TBA

May 18 Round 13	L.D.U. Quito	v	Libertad	Quito
TBA				Stadium: Estadio Rodrigo Paz Delgado; Referee: TBA

May 25 Round 14	Universidad Católica	v	L.D.U. Quito	Quito
TBA				Stadium: Estadio Olímpico Atahualpa; Referee: TBA

June 1 Round 15	L.D.U. Quito	v	Técnico Universitario	Quito
TBA				Stadium: Estadio Rodrigo Paz Delgado; Referee: TBA

June 15 Round 16	Vinotinto	v	L.D.U. Quito	Quito
TBA				Stadium: Estadio Olímpico Atahualpa; Referee: TBA

June 22 Round 17	L.D.U. Quito	v	Independiente del Valle	Quito
TBA				Stadium: Estadio Rodrigo Paz Delgado; Referee: TBA

June 29 Round 18	Orense	v	L.D.U. Quito	Machala
TBA				Stadium: Estadio 9 de Mayo; Referee: TBA

July 6 Round 19	Delfín	v	L.D.U. Quito	Manta
TBA				Stadium: Estadio Jocay; Referee: TBA

July 13 Round 20	L.D.U. Quito	v	Emelec	Quito
TBA				Stadium: Estadio Rodrigo Paz Delgado; Referee: TBA

July 20 Round 21	L.D.U. Quito	v	Deportivo Cuenca	Quito
TBA				Stadium: Estadio Rodrigo Paz Delgado; Referee: TBA

July 27 Round 22	Barcelona SC	v	L.D.U. Quito	Guayaquil
TBA				Stadium: Monumental Banco Pichincha; Referee: TBA

August 3 Round 23	L.D.U. Quito	v	Mushuc Runa	Quito
TBA				Stadium: Estadio Rodrigo Paz Delgado; Referee: TBA

August 10 Round 24	Aucas	v	L.D.U. Quito	Quito
TBA				Stadium: Estadio Gonzalo Pozo Ripalda; Referee: TBA

August 17 Round 25	L.D.U. Quito	v	Manta	Quito
TBA				Stadium: Estadio Rodrigo Paz Delgado; Referee: TBA

August 24 Round 26	El Nacional	v	L.D.U. Quito	Quito
TBA				Stadium: Estadio Olímpico Atahualpa; Referee: TBA

August 31 Round 27	L.D.U. Quito	v	Macará	Quito
TBA				Stadium: Estadio Rodrigo Paz Delgado; Referee: TBA

September 14 Round 28	Libertad	v	L.D.U. Quito	Loja
TBA				Stadium: Estadio Federativo Reina del Cisne; Referee: TBA

September 21 Round 29	L.D.U. Quito	v	Universidad Católica	Quito
TBA				Stadium: Estadio Rodrigo Paz Delgado; Referee: TBA

September 28 Round 30	Técnico Universitario	v	L.D.U. Quito	Ambato
TBA				Stadium: Estadio Bellavista; Referee: TBA

=== CONMEBOL Libertadores ===
L.D.U. Quito qualified to the 2025 CONMEBOL Libertadores—their 22nd participation in the continental tournament—as champions of the 2024 LigaPro. They will enter the competition in the Group Stage.

Overall								Home						Away					
Pld	W	D	L	GF	GA	GD	Pts	W	D	L	GF	GA	GD	W	D	L	GF	GA	GD
0	0	0	0	0	0	0	0	0	0	0	0	0	0	0	0	0	0	0	0

==== Group stage ====
April 3 Round 1	Central Córdoba (Argentina)	0–0	LDU Quito (Ecuador)	TBA
TBA				Stadium: TBA; Referee: TBA

April 9 Round 2	TBA	2–0	TBA	TBA
TBA				Stadium: TBA; Referee: TBA

TBA Round 3	TBA	0–0	TBA	TBA
TBA				Stadium: TBA; Referee: TBA

TBA Round 4	TBA	2–3	TBA	TBA
TBA				Stadium: TBA; Referee: TBA

TBA Round 5	TBA	2–0	TBA	TBA
TBA				Stadium: TBA; Referee: TBA

May 28 Round 6	LDU Quito (Ecuador)	3–0	Central Córdoba (Argentina)	TBA
TBA	Alvarado 15'; Alzugaray 44', 53'			Stadium: TBA; Referee: TBA

=== Supercopa Ecuador ===
L.D.U. Quito qualified to the 2025 Supercopa Ecuador—their 3rd participation in the tournament—as champions of the 2024 LigaPro.

February 1 Final	El Nacional	0–0 (4–5 p)	L.D.U. Quito	Quito
19:00 UTC−05:00	Montaño (yellow card) 5'; R. Cabezas (red card) 18'; D. Cabezas (yellow card) 45+2'; Caicedo (red card) 90+4'		Ramírez (yellow card) 11'; Quiñónez (yellow card) 23'; Domínguez (yellow card) 44'	Stadium: Estadio Gonzalo Pozo Ripalda; Referee: Yerson Zambrano
	Penalties
	Flor (penalty scored); Bedoya (penalty scored); Martínez (penalty scored); Vélez (penalty missed); Ledesma (penalty scored)		(penalty scored) Alzugaray; (penalty scored) Arce; (penalty scored) Estrada; (penalty scored) Quiñónez; (penalty scored) Carlos Gruezo

=== Copa Ecuador ===
It will be L.D.U. Quito's 4th participation in the Copa Ecuador.

Overall								Home						Away					
Pld	W	D	L	GF	GA	GD	Pts	W	D	L	GF	GA	GD	W	D	L	GF	GA	GD
0	0	0	0	0	0	0	0	0	0	0	0	0	0	0	0	0	0	0	0

== Player statistics ==
Num	Pos	Player	App	Goal	Yellow card	Red card	App	Goal	Yellow card	Red card	App	Goal	Yellow card	Red card	App	Goal	Yellow card	Red card	App	Goal	Yellow card	Red card
Num	Pos	Player	LigaPro				CONMEBOL Libertadores				Supercopa Ecuador				Copa Ecuador				Total			
1	GK	Gonzalo Valle	—	—	—	—	—	—	—	—	—	—	—	—	—	—	—	—	—	—	—	—
2	DF	Yeltzin Erique	—	—	—	—	—	—	—	—	—	—	—	—	—	—	—	—	—	—	—	—
3	DF	Richard Mina	—	—	—	—	—	—	—	—	—	—	—	—	—	—	—	—	—	—	—	—
4	DF	Ricardo Adé	—	—	—	—	—	—	—	—	1	—	—	—	—	—	—	—	1	—	—	—
5	DF	Kevin Minda	—	—	—	—	—	—	—	—	—	—	—	—	—	—	—	—	—	—	—	—
6	DF	Darío Aimar	—	—	—	—	—	—	—	—	—	—	—	—	—	—	—	—	—	—	—	—
7	MF	Lautaro Pastrán	—	—	—	—	—	—	—	—	1	—	—	—	—	—	—	—	1	—	—	—
8	MF	Carlos Gruezo	—	—	—	—	—	—	—	—	1	—	—	—	—	—	—	—	1	—	—	—
9	FW	Lisandro Alzugaray	—	—	—	—	—	—	—	—	1	—	—	—	—	—	—	—	1	—	—	—
10	MF	Alexander Alvarado	—	—	—	—	—	—	—	—	1	—	—	—	—	—	—	—	—	—	—	—
11	FW	Michael Estrada	—	—	—	—	—	—	—	—	1	—	—	—	—	—	—	—	1	—	—	—
12	GK	Alexis Villa	—	—	—	—	—	—	—	—	—	—	—	—	—	—	—	—	—	—	—	—
14	DF	José Quintero	—	—	—	—	—	—	—	—	—	—	—	—	—	—	—	—	—	—	—	—
15	MF	Gabriel Villamil	—	—	—	—	—	—	—	—	1	—	—	—	—	—	—	—	1	—	—	—
17	MF	Darío Mina	—	—	—	—	—	—	—	—	1	—	—	—	—	—	—	—	1	—	—	—
19	FW	Álex Arce	—	—	—	—	—	—	—	—	1	—	—	—	—	—	—	—	1	—	—	—
20	MF	Fernando Cornejo	—	—	—	—	—	—	—	—	1	—	—	—	—	—	—	—	1	—	—	—
21	MF	Ederson Castillo	—	—	—	—	—	—	—	—	—	—	—	—	—	—	—	—	—	—	—	—
22	GK	Alexander Domínguez	—	—	—	—	—	—	—	—	1	—	1	—	—	—	—	—	1	—	1	—
24	FW	Alejandro Cabeza	—	—	—	—	—	—	—	—	—	—	—	—	—	—	—	—	—	—	—	—
29	DF	Bryan Ramírez	—	—	—	—	—	—	—	—	1	—	1	—	—	—	—	—	1	—	1	—
30	DF	Gian Franco Allala	—	—	—	—	—	—	—	—	1	—	—	—	—	—	—	—	1	—	—	—
31	DF	Daniel de la Cruz	—	—	—	—	—	—	—	—	1	—	—	—	—	—	—	—	1	—	—	—
32	MF	Juan Sebastián Rodríguez	—	—	—	—	—	—	—	—	—	—	—	—	—	—	—	—	—	—	—	—
33	DF	Leonel Quiñónez	—	—	—	—	—	—	—	—	1	—	1	—	—	—	—	—	1	—	1	—
Totals			—	0	0	0	—	0	0	0	—	0	3	0	—	0	0	0	—	0	3	0

As of February 1, 2025

Note: Players in italics left the club mid-season.

== Team statistics ==
	Total	Home	Away	Neutral
Total Games played	1			1
Total Games won				
Total Games drawn	1			1
Total Games lost				
Games played (LigaPro)				
Games won (LigaPro)				
Games drawn (LigaPro)				
Games lost (LigaPro)				
Games played (CONMEBOL Libertadores)				
Games won (CONMEBOL Libertadores)				
Games drawn (CONMEBOL Libertadores)				
Games lost (CONMEBOL Libertadores)				
Games played (Supercopa Ecuador)	1			1
Games won (Supercopa Ecuador)				
Games drawn (Supercopa Ecuador)	1			1
Games lost (Supercopa Ecuador)				
Games played (Copa Ecuador)				
Games won (Copa Ecuador)				
Games drawn (Copa Ecuador)				
Games lost (Copa Ecuador)				
Biggest win (LigaPro)				
Biggest loss (LigaPro)				
Biggest win (CONMEBOL Libertadores)				
Biggest loss (CONMEBOL Libertadores)				
Biggest win (Supercopa Ecuador)				
Biggest loss (Supercopa Ecuador)				
Biggest win (Copa Ecuador)				
Biggest loss (Copa Ecuador)				
Clean sheets	1			1
Goals scored	0			0
Goals conceded	0			0
Goal difference	0			0
Average GF per game	0			0
Average GA per game	0			0
Yellow cards	3			3
Red cards				
Most appearances	Ricardo Adé (1); Gian Franco Allala (1); Alexander Alvarado (1); Lisandro Alzugaray (1); Álex Arce (1); Fernando Cornejo (1); Daniel de la Cruz (1); Alexander Domínguez (1); Michael Estrada (1); Carlos Gruezo (1); Darío Mina (1); Lautaro Pastrán (1); Leonel Quiñónez (1); Bryan Ramírez (1); Gabriel Villamil (1)			Ricardo Adé (1); Gian Franco Allala (1); Alexander Alvarado (1); Lisandro Alzugaray (1); Álex Arce (1); Fernando Cornejo (1); Daniel de la Cruz (1); Alexander Domínguez (1); Michael Estrada (1); Carlos Gruezo (1); Darío Mina (1); Lautaro Pastrán (1); Leonel Quiñónez (1); Bryan Ramírez (1); Gabriel Villamil (1)
Most minutes played	Ricardo Adé (90); Gian Franco Allala (90); Álex Arce (90); Daniel de la Cruz (90); Alexander Domínguez (90); Carlos Gruezo (90); Leonel Quiñónez (90); Bryan Ramírez (90)			Ricardo Adé (90); Gian Franco Allala (90); Álex Arce (90); Daniel de la Cruz (90); Alexander Domínguez (90); Carlos Gruezo (90); Leonel Quiñónez (90); Bryan Ramírez (90)
Top scorer				
Worst discipline	Alexander Domínguez (1) (yellow card); Leonel Quiñónez (1) (yellow card); Bryan Ramírez (1) (yellow card)			Alexander Domínguez (1) (yellow card); Leonel Quiñónez (1) (yellow card); Bryan Ramírez (1) (yellow card)
Penalties for				
Penalties against				
League Points				
Winning rate	0%			0%

As of February 1, 2025
Source: See Competitive matches (above)
