= 2025 Supercopa Ecuador =

2025 Supercopa Ecuador Ecuabet
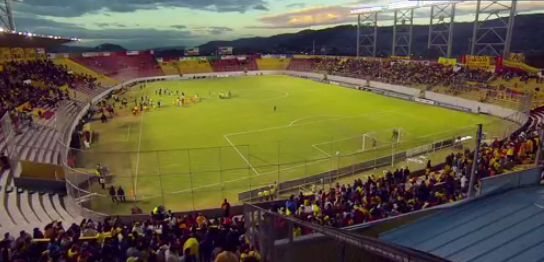
- Estadio Gonzalo Pozo Ripalda in Quito hosted the match.
El Nacional	LDU Quito
0	0
- LDU Quito won 5–4 on penalties
- Date: 1 February 2025
- Venue: Estadio Gonzalo Pozo Ripalda, Quito
- Referee: Yerson Zambrano

The 2025 Supercopa Ecuador, known as 2025 Supercopa Ecuador Ecuabet for sponsorship purposes, was the fourth edition of the Supercopa Ecuador, Ecuador's football super cup, organized by the Ecuadorian Football Federation (FEF). It was held on 1 February 2025 between the 2024 Copa Ecuador champions El Nacional and the 2024 Ecuadorian Serie A champions LDU Quito at Estadio Gonzalo Pozo Ripalda in Quito.

In the match, LDU Quito defeated El Nacional on kicks from the penalty mark following a 0–0 draw to claim their third Supercopa Ecuador title. The Supercopa Ecuador returned after a one-year hiatus, given that it was not played in 2024 due to the cancellation of the Copa Ecuador in 2023.

== Teams ==
The match was played by LDU Quito and El Nacional, champions of the Ecuadorian Serie A and the Copa Ecuador in the 2024 season. While this was a debut appearance for El Nacional in the competition, LDU Quito played their third Supercopa Ecuador, having won the title in their previous appearances in 2020 and 2021.

Team	Qualification	Previous appearances (bold indicates winners)
LDU Quito	2024 Ecuadorian Serie A champions	2 (**2020**, **2021**)
El Nacional	2024 Copa Ecuador champions	None

== Details ==
1 February 2025
19:00 UTC−5

El Nacional	0–0	LDU Quito
	Report
Penalties
Flor (penalty scored); Bedoya (penalty scored); Martínez (penalty scored); Vélez (penalty missed); Ledesma (penalty scored)	4–5	(penalty scored) Alzugaray; (penalty scored) Arce; (penalty scored) Estrada; (penalty scored) Quiñónez; (penalty scored) Gruezo

Estadio Gonzalo Pozo Ripalda, Quito
Referee: Yerson Zambrano

**El Nacional**	**LDU Quito**

GK	12	(Ecuador) David Cabezas	(yellow card) 45+1'
RB	25	(Ecuador) Marco Montaño	(yellow card) 5'	(substituted off) 78'
CB	32	(Ecuador) Anthony Bedoya
CB	4	(Ecuador) Rommel Cabezas	(red card) 18'
LB	24	(Ecuador) Fernando Mora
DCM	14	(Ecuador) Darío Pazmiño		(substituted off) 78'
DCM	17	(Ecuador) Charles Vélez
AM	29	(Ecuador) José Cevallos		(substituted off) 89'
RW	20	(Ecuador) Jawer Guisamano		(substituted off) 78'
LW	19	(Ecuador) Eddy Mejía		(substituted off) 22'
CF	16	(Ecuador) Jhon Cifuente		(substituted off) 89'
Substitutes:
GK	1	(Ecuador) Leodán Chalá
DF	5	(Ecuador) José Flor		(substituted on) 22'
DF	15	(Ecuador) Adrián Cela		(substituted on) 78'
DF	28	(Ecuador) Bryan Rivera
MF	6	(Ecuador) Marcos Olmedo		(substituted on) 78'
MF	13	(Ecuador) Edison Caicedo	(red card) 90+4'	(substituted on) 78'
FW	8	(Ecuador) Fidel Martínez		(substituted on) 89'
FW	21	(Ecuador) Ángel Ledesma		(substituted on) 89'
FW	77	(Ecuador) Jeison Chalá
Manager:
(Argentina) Omar Asad

GK	22	(Ecuador) Alexander Domínguez	(yellow card) 44'
RB	31	(Ecuador) Daniel de la Cruz
CB	4	(Haiti) Ricardo Adé
CB	30	(Uruguay) Gian Franco Allala
LB	33	(Ecuador) Leonel Quiñónez	(yellow card) 23'
DCM	8	(Ecuador) Carlos Gruezo
CM	15	(Bolivia) Gabriel Villamil		(substituted off) 46'
CM	20	(Chile) Fernando Cornejo		(substituted off) 71'
RW	29	(Ecuador) Bryan Ramírez	(yellow card) 11'	(substituted off) 90+6'
LW	7	(Chile) Lautaro Pastrán		(substituted off) 28'
CF	19	(Paraguay) Álex Arce
Substitutes:
GK	1	(Ecuador) Gonzalo Valle
DF	2	(Ecuador) Yeltzin Erique
DF	6	(Ecuador) Darío Aimar
MF	5	(Ecuador) Kevin Minda
MF	21	(Ecuador) Ederson Castillo
FW	9	(Argentina) Lisandro Alzugaray		(substituted on) 28'
FW	10	(Ecuador) Alexander Alvarado		(substituted on) 71'
FW	11	(Ecuador) Michael Estrada		(substituted on) 46'
FW	17	(Ecuador) Freddy Mina		(substituted on) 90+6'
Manager:
(Argentina) Pablo Sánchez

Assistant referees:
David Vacacela
Mauricio Lozada
Fourth official:
Henry Arizaga
Video assistant referee:
Luis Quiroz
Assistant video assistant referee:
Christian Lescano

**Match rules**

- 90 minutes.
- Penalty shoot-out if scores still level.
- Nine named substitutes.
- Maximum of five substitutions, with an additional substitution enabled for both teams in the event of a concussion.
