= 2023 Liga Deportiva Universitaria de Quito season =

L.D.U. Quito
2023 season
- President: Isaac Álvarez
- Manager: Luis Zubeldía
- Stadium: Estadio Rodrigo Paz Delgado
- LigaPro: Champions (12th title)
- Conmebol Sudamericana: Champions (2nd title)
- Top goalscorer: League: Alexander Alvarado (10 goals); All: Alexander Alvarado (12 goals)

Liga Deportiva Universitaria de Quito's 2023 season was the club's 93rd year of existence, the 70th year in professional football, and the 62nd in the top level of professional football in Ecuador.

== Club ==
=== Personnel ===
President: Isaac Álvarez
President of the Executive Commission: Esteban Paz
Sporting manager: Santiago Jácome

=== Coaching staff ===
Manager: Luis Zubeldía
Assistant manager: Maximiliano Cuberas, Carlos Gruezo
Physical trainer: Lucas Vivas
Goalkeeper trainer: Luis Preti

=== Kits ===
Supplier: Puma
Sponsor(s): Banco Pichincha, Chery, Discover, Ecuabet, Salud SA, Chubb

== Squad information ==
Num	Pos	Nat.	Player	Age	Since	App	Goals	Notes
2	DF	ECU	Yeltzin Erique	19	2023	0	0	
3	DF	ECU	Richard Mina	23	2023	0	0	
4	DF	HAI	Ricardo Adé	32	2023	0	0	
5	MF	ECU	Óscar Zambrano	18	2022	13	1	
6	DF	ARG	Facundo Rodríguez	22	2023	0	0	
7	FW	VEN	Jan Carlos Hurtado	23	2023	0	0	
9	FW	PER	Paolo Guerrero	39	2023	0	0	
10	MF	ECU	Alexander Alvarado	23	2022	27	10	
11	FW	ECU	Walter Chalá	30	2023	0	0	
12	GK	ECU	Ethan Minda	18	2022	0	0	
13	DF	ECU	Daykol Romero	21	2021	16	0	
14	DF	ECU	José Quintero	32	2015	227	17	
16	DF	ARG	Mauricio Martínez	29	2023	0	0	
18	MF	ARG	Lucas Piovi	31	2020	66	0	
19	FW	ECU	José Enrique Angulo	27	2023	0	0	
20	FW	ARG	Lisandro Alzugaray	32	2023	0	0	
21	MF	ECU	Sebastián González	19	2021	28	3	
22	GK	ECU	Alexander Domínguez	35	2022	305	0	Previously with the club from '06–'16
23	GK	ECU	Adrián Gabbarini	37	2018	129	0	
25	MF	ECU	Jefferson Valverde	24	2023	0	0	
26	MF	ECU	Jhojan Julio	24	2023	149	19	Previously with the club from '16–'22
29	DF	ECU	Bryan Ramírez	22	2023	0	0	
30	MF	ECU	Danny Luna	31	2022	13	1	
32	FW	ECU	Renato Ibarra	31	2023	0	0	
33	DF	ECU	Leonel Quiñónez	29	2023	0	0	
34	MF	ECU	Ariel Mina	19	2021	3	0	
35	FW	ECU	Jairón Charcopa	18	2021	1	0	

Note: Caps and goals are of the national league and are current as of the beginning of the season.

=== Winter transfers ===
Players In
Name	Nat	Pos	Age	Moving from
Ricardo Adé	HAI	DF	32	Aucas (Ecuador)
Mauricio Martínez	ARG	DF	29	Racing (Argentina) (Loan)
Jimmy Mina	ECU	DF	23	Unibolívar (Ecuador) (Loan)
Richard Mina	ECU	DF	23	Aucas (Ecuador)
Leonel Quiñónez	ECU	DF	29	Barcelona SC (Ecuador) (Loan)
Bryan Ramírez	ECU	DF	22	Cumbayá (Ecuador)
Facundo Rodríguez	ARG	DF	22	Guillermo Brown (Argentina) (Loan)
Jefferson Arce	ECU	MF	22	Macará (Ecuador) (Loan return)
Jhojan Julio	ECU	MF	24	Santos (Brazil) (Loan return)
Marcos Olmedo	ECU	MF	23	Macará (Ecuador) (Loan)
Lisandro Alzugaray	ARG	FW	32	Al Ahli (Saudi Arabia)
José Enrique Angulo	ECU	FW	27	Club Tijuana (Mexico) (Loan)
Walter Chalá	ECU	FW	30	Universidad Católica (Ecuador)
Renato Ibarra	ECU	FW	31	Club Tijuana (Mexico) (Loan)

Players Out
Name	Nat	Pos	Age	Moving to
Gonzalo Falcón	URU	GK	26	Sportivo Luqueño (Paraguay)
Luis Ayala	ECU	DF	29	Técnico Universitario (Ecuador)
Luis Caicedo	ECU	DF	30	Atlético Huila (Colombia)
Moisés Corozo	ECU	DF	30	Mushuc Runa (Ecuador)
Christian Cruz	ECU	DF	30	Emelec (Ecuador)
Franklin Guerra	ECU	DF	30	Universidad Católica (Ecuador) (Loan)
Andrés López	ECU	DF	29	Deportivo Cuenca (Ecuador)
Zaid Romero	ARG	DF	23	Estudiantes de La Plata (Argentina)
Joseph Espinoza	ECU	MF	22	Emelec (Ecuador) (Loan)
Gustavo Nnachi	ECU	MF	20	Vitória S.C. B (Portugal)
Lucas Gamba	ARG	FW	35	Central Córdoba (Argentina)
Michael Hoyos	ECU	FW	31	Independiente del Valle (Ecuador)
Tomás Molina	ARG	FW	27	FC Juárez (Mexico)

=== Summer transfers ===
Players In
Name	Nat	Pos	Age	Moving from
Jefferson Valverde	ECU	MF	24	El Nacional (Ecuador)
Paolo Guerrero	PER	FW	39	Racing (Argentina)
Jan Carlos Hurtado	VEN	FW	23	Boca Juniors (Argentina) (Loan)

Players Out
Name	Nat	Pos	Age	Moving to
Brian Heras	ECU	GK	28	Delfín (Ecuador)
Jimmy Mina	ECU	DF	24	Cumbayá (Ecuador)
Jefferson Arce	ECU	MF	23	Barcelona SC (Ecuador)
Denil Castillo	ECU	MF	19	Shakhtar Donetsk (Ukraine)
Ángel González	ARG	MF	29	Peñarol (Uruguay)
Marcos Olmedo	ECU	MF	24	Macará (Ecuador) (Loan return)
Juan Luis Anangonó	ECU	FW	34	Comunicaciones (Guatemala)

== Competitions ==
Competition	Started round	Final position / round	First match	Last match
LigaPro	First Stage	Champions	February 24	December 17
CONMEBOL Sudamericana	First Stage	Champions	March 7	October 28

=== Pre-season friendlies ===
January 22 Noche Embajadora	Millonarios	0–0	L.D.U. Quito	Bogotá
17:30 UTC−05:00				Stadium: Estadio El Campín

January 29 Noche Blanca	L.D.U. Quito	1–2	El Nacional	Quito
11:30 UTC−05:00	Julio 52'		Asprilla 57'; Carrillo 63'	Stadium: Estadio Rodrigo Paz Delgado

February 1 Copa de Campeones	Aucas	1–4	L.D.U. Quito	Quito
19:00 UTC−05:00	Vega 2'		Angulo 24'; Alvarado 45+1'; Julio 72'; González 87'	Stadium: Estadio Gonzalo Pozo Ripalda

February 4 Copa de Campeones	L.D.U. Quito	0–0	Aucas	Quito
15:30 UTC−05:00				Stadium: Estadio Rodrigo Paz Delgado

February 15 Copa de Campeones	Deportivo Cuenca	1–1	L.D.U. Quito	Cuenca
19:00 UTC−05:00	López 46'		Alvarado 52'	Stadium: Estadio Alejandro Serrano Aguilar

February 19 Copa de Campeones	L.D.U. Quito	3–0	Deportivo Cuenca	Quito
16:00 UTC−05:00	Angulo 18'; Quiñónez 81'; González 90+2'			Stadium: Estadio Rodrigo Paz Delgado

=== LigaPro ===
The 2023 season was Liga's 62nd season in the Serie A and their 22nd consecutive. They won their 12th title.

==== First stage ====
Results summary

Overall								Home						Away					
Pld	W	D	L	GF	GA	GD	Pts	W	D	L	GF	GA	GD	W	D	L	GF	GA	GD
15	7	5	3	29	17	+12	26	3	3	1	14	7	+7	4	2	2	15	10	+5

Results by round

Round	1	2	3	4	5	6	7	8	9	10	11	12	13	14	15
Ground	A	H	A	H	A	H	A	A	H	A	H	A	H	H	A
Result	L	D	W	W	W	L	L	W	D	D	W	W	W	D	D
Position	14	14	7	2	2	5	6	5	6	6	4	3	2	4	3

Updated to match(es) played on March 4. Source: Competitive matches
A = Away; H = Home; W = Win; D = Draw; L = Loss

February 24 Round 1	Deportivo Cuenca	2–0	L.D.U. Quito	Cuenca
19:00 UTC−05:00	López 39' (pen.); Mera 77', (yellow card) 79'	Report	Domínguez (yellow card) 36'; R. Mina (yellow card) 37'; Rodríguez (yellow card) 43'; Quintero (red card) 84'; Alvarado (yellow card) 90+6'	Stadium: Estadio Alejandro Serrano Aguilar; Attendance: 6,793; Referee: Augusto Aragón

March 4 Round 2	L.D.U. Quito	1–1	Aucas	Quito
16:30 UTC−05:00	Alvarado 45+1' (pen.); Ramírez (yellow card) 45+10'	Report	Romero (yellow card) 11'; Cifuente (yellow card) 22'; Rezabala (red card) 26'; Cangá 32' (pen.)	Stadium: Estadio Rodrigo Paz Delgado; Attendance: 15,657; Referee: Juan Carlos Andrade

March 19 Round 3	El Nacional	0–2	L.D.U. Quito	Quito
16:30 UTC−05:00	Chalá (yellow card) 10'; Balda (yellow card) 40'; Valverde (yellow card) 51'		Rodríguez (yellow card) 16'; Alvarado (yellow card) 50'; Adé (yellow card) 58'; Ibarra 68'; A. González 90'; Domínguez (yellow card) 90+3'	Stadium: Estadio Olímpico Atahualpa; Attendance: 17,509; Referee: Guillermo Guerrero

March 31 Round 4	L.D.U. Quito	6–1	Gualaceo	Quito
16:30 UTC−05:00	Angulo 8', 23'; Adé (yellow card) 19'; Alvarado 31'; Ibarra 40'; Quintero 61'; Anangonó 72'		Hernández (yellow card) 64'; Morocho 77'	Stadium: Estadio Rodrigo Paz Delgado; Attendance: 1,949; Referee: Luis Quiroz

April 9 Round 5	Guayaquil City	1–2	L.D.U. Quito	Guayaquil
15:30 UTC−05:00	Parrales (yellow card) 21', (goal) 33'; Willian Vargas (yellow card) 45+1'; Mauricio Alonso (yellow card) 59'; Renato César (yellow card) 90+7'		Alvarado 90+9' (pen.); A. González 90+11'	Stadium: Estadio Christian Benítez Betancourt; Attendance: 1,117; Referee: Jaime Sánchez

April 15 Round 6	L.D.U. Quito	0–1	Barcelona SC	Quito
18:00 UTC−05:00	Zambrano (yellow card) 66'; Alvarado (yellow card) 70'; A. González (yellow card) 90+19'		Fydriszewski (yellow card) 33'; Angulo 45+2' (o.g.); Pineida (yellow card) 53'; Burrai (yellow card) 74'; Díaz (yellow card) 82'; Cortez (yellow card) 90+13'; Sosa (yellow card) 90+19'	Stadium: Estadio Rodrigo Paz Delgado; Referee: René Marín

April 22 Round 7	Orense	2–1	L.D.U. Quito	Machala
18:00 UTC−05:00	Quiñónez (yellow card) 45+3'; Alvarado 82' (pen.); Rodríguez (yellow card) 90+12'		Solano 18'; Burbano (yellow card) 45+1'; Plúas (yellow card) 58'; Assis (yellow card) 72'; Quintana 83'	Stadium: Estadio 9 de Mayo; Referee: Carlos Orbe

April 29 Round 8	Universidad Católica	0–4	L.D.U. Quito	Quito
15:30 UTC−05:00	Ordóñez (red card) 9'; Martínez (yellow card) 14'; Anangonó (yellow card) 33'; Colmán (yellow card) 59'; Minda (yellow card) 61'		Alvarado 12' (pen.); Angulo 19', (yellow card) 61'; Zambrano (yellow card) 22'; Quintero 26'; Julio 56'	Stadium: Estadio Olímpico Atahualpa; Referee: Guillermo Guerrero

May 8 Round 9	L.D.U. Quito	1–1	Delfín	Quito
19:00 UTC−05:00	S. González 66'		Oyola (yellow card) 22'; García (yellow card) 41'; Alman 49'; Jaramillo (yellow card) 69'	Stadium: Estadio Rodrigo Paz Delgado; Referee: Roberto Sánchez

May 14 Round 10	Emelec	1–1	L.D.U. Quito	Guayaquil
18:00 UTC−05:00				Stadium: Estadio George Capwell

May 19 Round 11	L.D.U. Quito	2–1	Técnico Universitario	Quito
17:30 UTC−05:00				Stadium: Estadio Rodrigo Paz Delgado

May 28 Round 12	Independiente del Valle	3–2	L.D.U. Quito	Quito
15:30 UTC−05:00				Stadium: Estadio Banco Guayaquil

June 2 Round 13	L.D.U. Quito	4–2	Libertad	Quito
19:30 UTC−05:00				Stadium: Estadio Rodrigo Paz Delgado

June 10 Round 14	L.D.U. Quito	0–0	Cumbayá	Quito
15:30 UTC−05:00				Stadium: Estadio Rodrigo Paz Delgado

June 17 Round 15	Mushuc Runa	2–2	L.D.U. Quito	Ambato
18:00 UTC−05:00				Stadium: Estadio Bellavista

==== Second stage ====
Results summary

Overall								Home						Away					
Pld	W	D	L	GF	GA	GD	Pts	W	D	L	GF	GA	GD	W	D	L	GF	GA	GD
15	11	3	1	21	4	+17	36	7	1	0	12	1	+11	4	2	1	9	3	+6

Results by round

Round	1	2	3	4	5	6	7	8	9	10	11	12	13	14	15
Ground	H	A	H	A	H	A	H	H	A	H	A	H	A	A	H
Result	W	D	D	W	W	L	W	W	D	W	W	W	W	W	W
Position	2	2	4	1	1	2	1	1	1	1	2	1	1	1	1

Updated to match(es) played on December 2. Source: Competitive matches
A = Away; H = Home; W = Win; D = Draw; L = Loss

August 7 Round 1	L.D.U. Quito	2–0	Deportivo Cuenca	Quito
19:00 UTC−05:00				Stadium: Estadio Rodrigo Paz Delgado

August 13 Round 2	Aucas	0–0	L.D.U. Quito	Quito
18:00 UTC−05:00				Stadium: Estadio Gonzalo Pozo Ripalda

August 18 Round 3	L.D.U. Quito	0–0	El Nacional	Quito
17:30 UTC−05:00				Stadium: Estadio Rodrigo Paz Delgado

August 27 Round 4	Gualaceo	1–3	L.D.U. Quito	Azogues
18:00 UTC−05:00				Stadium: Estadio Jorge Andrade

September 4 Round 5	L.D.U. Quito	2–0	Guayaquil City	Quito
19:00 UTC−05:00				Stadium: Estadio Rodrigo Paz Delgado

September 17 Round 6	Barcelona SC	1–0	L.D.U. Quito	Guayaquil
18:00 UTC−05:00				Stadium: Monumental Banco Pichincha

September 22 Round 7	L.D.U. Quito	1–0	Orense	Quito
19:00 UTC−05:00				Stadium: Estadio Rodrigo Paz Delgado

October 8 Round 9	Delfín	0–0	L.D.U. Quito	Manta
18:00 UTC−05:00				Stadium: Estadio Jocay

October 22 Round 10	L.D.U. Quito	1–0	Emelec	Quito
18:00 UTC−05:00				Stadium: Estadio Rodrigo Paz Delgado
Note: This match was rescheduled to October 23rd at noon due to heavy rain and an electric storm.

November 1 Round 8	L.D.U. Quito	1–0	Universidad Católica	Quito
19:00 UTC−05:00				Stadium: Estadio Rodrigo Paz Delgado
Note: This match was moved forward due to Liga's Semifinal match of the Copa Sudamericana.

November 4 Round 12	L.D.U. Quito	2–0	Independiente del Valle	Quito
18:00 UTC−05:00				Stadium: Estadio Rodrigo Paz Delgado

November 8 Round 11	Técnico Universitario	0–2	L.D.U. Quito	Ambato
19:00 UTC−05:00				Stadium: Estadio Bellavista
Note: This match was moved forward due to Liga's Final match of the Copa Sudamericana.

November 12 Round 13	Libertad	0–2	L.D.U. Quito	Loja
15:00 UTC−05:00				Stadium: Estadio Federativo Reina del Cisne

November 26 Round 14	Cumbayá	1–2	L.D.U. Quito	Quito
18:00 UTC−05:00				Stadium: Estadio Olímpico Atahualpa

December 2 Round 15	L.D.U. Quito	3–1	Mushuc Runa	Quito
15:30 UTC−05:00				Stadium: Estadio Rodrigo Paz Delgado

==== Finals ====
Results summary

Overall								Home						Away					
Pld	W	D	L	GF	GA	GD	Pts	W	D	L	GF	GA	GD	W	D	L	GF	GA	GD
2	0	2	0	1	1	0	2	0	1	0	1	1	0	0	1	0	0	0	0

Results by round

Round	1	2
Ground	A	H
Result	D	D

Updated to match(es) played on December 17. Source: Competitive matches
A = Away; H = Home; W = Win; D = Draw; L = Loss

December 10 Finals	Independiente del Valle	0–0	L.D.U. Quito	Quito
16:30 UTC−05:00				Stadium: Estadio Banco Guayaquil

December 17 Round 15	L.D.U. Quito	1–1 (3–0 p)	Independiente del Valle	Quito
16:30 UTC−05:00				Stadium: Estadio Rodrigo Paz Delgado
	Penalties
	Alzugaray (penalty scored); Hurtado (penalty scored); Quiñónez (penalty scored)		(penalty missed) Faravelli; (penalty missed) Alcívar; (penalty missed) Moreno

=== CONMEBOL Sudamericana ===
L.D.U. Quito qualified to the 2023 CONMEBOL Sudamericana—their 14th participation in the continental tournament—as 4th place in the 2022 LigaPro. They will enter the competition in the First Stage.

==== CONMEBOL Sudamericana squad ====
No.	Pos.	Nation	Player
2	DF	ECU	Yeltzin Erique
3	DF	ECU	Richard Mina
4	DF	HAI	Ricardo Adé
5	MF	ECU	Óscar Zambrano
6	DF	ARG	Facundo Rodríguez
9	FW	ARG	Lisandro Alzugaray
10	MF	ECU	Alexander Alvarado
11	FW	ECU	Walter Chalá
12	GK	ECU	Ethan Minda
13	DF	ECU	Daykol Romero
14	DF	ECU	José Quintero
16	MF	ARG	Mauricio Martínez
18	MF	ARG	Lucas Piovi (captain)
19	FW	ECU	José Enrique Angulo

No.	Pos.	Nation	Player
21	MF	ECU	Sebastián González
22	GK	ECU	Alexander Domínguez
23	GK	ECU	Adrián Gabbarini
24	FW	PER	Paolo Guerrero
25	FW	ECU	Jefferson Valverde
26	MF	ECU	Jhojan Julio
27	FW	VEN	Jan Carlos Hurtado
29	DF	ECU	Bryan Ramírez
30	MF	ECU	Danny Luna
32	FW	ECU	Renato Ibarra
33	DF	ECU	Leonel Quiñónez
34	DF	ECU	Ariel Mina
49	FW	ECU	Jairón Charcopa

Overall								Home						Away					
Pld	W	D	L	GF	GA	GD	Pts	W	D	L	GF	GA	GD	W	D	L	GF	GA	GD
1	1	0	0	4	0	+4	3	1	0	0	4	0	+4	0	0	0	0	0	0

==== First stage ====
March 7 First Stage	L.D.U. Quito (Ecuador)	4–0	(Ecuador) Delfín	Quito, Ecuador
21:00 UTC−05:00	Alzugaray 7'; Angulo 20'; Adé (yellow card) 73'; Alvarado 78'; Caicedo 90+2' (o.g.)	Report	Cuero (yellow card) 43'; García (yellow card) 45+2'	Stadium: Estadio Rodrigo Paz Delgado; Attendance: 6,688; Referee: Darío Herrera (Argentina)

==== Group stage ====
Pos	Team	Pld	W	D	L	GF	GA	GD	Pts	Qualification	LDQ	BOT	MAG	UCV
1	(Ecuador) LDU Quito	6	3	3	0	10	2	+8	12	Round of 16	—	0–0	4–0	3–0
2	(Brazil) Botafogo	6	2	4	0	10	5	+5	10	Knockout round play-offs	0–0	—	1–1	4–0
3	(Chile) Magallanes	6	0	4	2	8	13	−5	4		1–1	2–2	—	2–2
4	(Peru) Universidad César Vallejo	6	1	1	4	8	16	−8	4		1–2	2–3	3–2	—

Source: CONMEBOL

April 4 Round 1	Universidad César Vallejo (Peru)	1–2	(Ecuador) L.D.U. Quito	Trujillo
19:00 UTC−05:00				Stadium: Estadio Mansiche

April 19 Round 2	L.D.U. Quito (Ecuador)	4–0	(Chile) Magallanes	Quito
21:00 UTC−05:00				Stadium: Estadio Rodrigo Paz Delgado

May 4 Round 3	Botafogo (Brazil)	0–0	(Ecuador) L.D.U. Quito	Rio de Janeiro
21:00 UTC−03:00				Stadium: Estádio Olímpico Nilton Santos

May 23 Round 4	Magallanes (Chile)	1–1	(Ecuador) L.D.U. Quito	Rancagua
20:00 UTC−04:00				Stadium: Estadio El Teniente

June 6 Round 5	L.D.U. Quito (Ecuador)	0–0	(Brazil) Botafogo	Quito
21:00 UTC−05:00				Stadium: Estadio Rodrigo Paz Delgado

June 29 Round 6	L.D.U. Quito (Ecuador)	3–0	(Peru) Universidad César Vallejo	Quito
19:00 UTC−05:00				Stadium: Estadio Rodrigo Paz Delgado

== Player statistics ==
Num	Pos	Player	App	Goal	Yellow card	Red card	App	Goal	Yellow card	Red card	App	Goal	Yellow card	Red card
Num	Pos	Player	LigaPro				CONMEBOL Sudamericana				Total			
2	DF	Yeltzin Erique	1	—	—	—	—	—	—	—	1	—	—	—
3	DF	Richard Mina	13	—	7	—	7	—	—	—	20	—	7	—
4	DF	Ricardo Adé	28	—	9	—	12	—	5	—	40	—	14	—
5	FW	Óscar Zambrano	24	—	2	—	7	—	—	—	31	—	2	—
6	DF	Facundo Rodríguez	26	1	8	—	11	1	1	—	37	2	9	—
7	FW	Jan Carlos Hurtado	10	3	4	—	—	—	—	—	10	3	4	—
9	FW	Paolo Guerrero	13	5	3	—	7	3	3	—	20	8	6	—
10	MF	Alexander Alvarado	31	10	7	—	13	2	2	1	44	12	9	1
11	FW	Walter Chalá	12	—	—	—	1	—	—	—	13	—	—	—
12	GK	Ethan Minda	1	—	—	—	—	—	—	—	1	—	—	—
13	DF	Daykol Romero	15	—	3	—	2	—	—	—	17	—	3	—
14	DF	José Quintero	23	5	—	2	13	—	2	—	36	5	2	2
16	DF	Mauricio Martínez	21	2	5	—	12	1	—	—	33	3	5	—
18	MF	Lucas Piovi	27	—	5	—	13	1	3	—	40	1	8	—
19	FW	José Enrique Angulo	22	5	1	—	10	3	—	—	32	8	1	—
20	FW	Lisandro Alzugaray	30	5	2	—	11	4	1	—	41	9	3	—
21	MF	Sebastián González	22	1	3	—	11	1	3	—	33	2	6	—
22	GK	Alexander Domínguez	27	—	2	—	14	—	2	—	41	—	4	—
23	GK	Adrián Gabbarini	4	—	1	—	—	—	—	—	4	—	1	—
25	MF	Jefferson Valverde	3	—	—	—	3	—	—	—	6	—	—	—
26	MF	Jhojan Julio	27	4	5	—	12	3	4	—	39	7	9	—
29	DF	Bryan Ramírez	25	—	2	—	9	—	1	—	34	—	3	—
30	MF	Danny Luna	13	1	—	—	3	—	—	—	16	1	—	—
32	FW	Renato Ibarra	26	3	2	—	13	1	1	—	39	4	3	—
33	DF	Leonel Quiñónez	23	1	4	—	13	—	4	—	36	1	8	—
34	DF	Ariel Mina	2	—	—	—	—	—	—	—	2	—	—	—
35	FW	Jairón Charcopa	3	—	—	—	2	—	—	—	5	—	—	—
8	MF	Ángel González	10	2	2	—	6	—	1	—	16	2	3	—
15	MF	Marcos Olmedo	2	—	—	—	1	—	—	—	3	—	—	—
24	GK	Brian Heras	—	—	—	—	—	—	—	—	—	—	—	—
25	FW	Juan Luis Anangonó	11	3	—	—	4	1	—	—	15	4	—	—
27	MF	Denil Castillo	—	—	—	—	—	—	—	—	—	—	—	—
28	DF	Jimmy Mina	—	—	—	—	—	—	—	—	—	—	—	—
31	MF	Jefferson Arce	5	—	2	—	—	—	—	—	5	—	2	—
Totals			—	51	79	2	—	21	33	1	—	72	112	3

As of December 17, 2023

Note: Players in italics left the club mid-season.

== Team statistics ==
	Total	Home	Away	Neutral
Total Games played	46	23	22	1
Total Games won	25	15	10	
Total Games drawn	15	6	8	1
Total Games lost	6	2	4	
Games played (LigaPro)	32	16	16	
Games won (LigaPro)	18	10	8	
Games drawn (LigaPro)	10	5	5	
Games lost (LigaPro)	4	1	3	
Games played (CONMEBOL Sudamericana)	14	7	6	1
Games won (CONMEBOL Sudamericana)	7	5	2	
Games drawn (CONMEBOL Sudamericana)	5	1	3	1
Games lost (CONMEBOL Sudamericana)	2	1	1	
Biggest win (LigaPro)	6–1 vs Gualaceo	6–1 vs Gualaceo	4–0 vs Universidad Católica	
Biggest loss (LigaPro)	0–2 vs Deportivo Cuenca	0–1 vs Barcelona SC	0–2 vs Deportivo Cuenca	
Biggest win (CONMEBOL Sudamericana)	4–0 vs Delfín; 4–0 vs Magallanes	4–0 vs Delfín; 4–0 vs Magallanes	2–1 vs Universidad César Vallejo; 1–0 vs Ñublense	
Biggest loss (CONMEBOL Sudamericana)	2–3 vs Ñublense; 0–1 vs São Paulo	2–3 vs Ñublense	0–1 vs São Paulo	
Clean sheets	23	13	10	
Goals scored	74	45	28	1
Goals conceded	30	13	16	1
Goal difference	+44	+32	+12	0
Average GF per game	1.61	1.96	1.27	1
Average GA per game	0.65	0.57	0.73	1
Yellow cards	112	41	69	2
Red cards	3		3	
Most appearances	Alexander Alvarado (44)	Alexander Alvarado (22)	Alexander Alvarado (21); Alexander Domínguez (21); Facundo Rodríguez (21)	Ricardo Adé (1); Alexander Alvarado (1); Lisandro Alzugaray (1); Alexander Domínguez (1); Sebastián González (1); Paolo Guerrero (1); Renato Ibarra (1); Jhojan Julio (1); Mauricio Martínez (1); Lucas Piovi (1); José Quintero (1); Leonel Quiñónez (1); Bryan Ramírez (1); Facundo Rodríguez (1)
Most minutes played	Alexander Domínguez (3610)	Ricardo Adé (1720)	Alexander Alvarado (1890)	Ricardo Adé (90); Alexander Domínguez (90); Paolo Guerrero (90); Jhojan Julio (90); Mauricio Martínez (90); Lucas Piovi (90); José Quintero (90); Leonel Quiñónez (90); Facundo Rodríguez (90)
Top scorer	Alexander Alvarado (12)	Alexander Alvarado (9)	Lisandro Alzugaray (5); Paolo Guerrero (5)	Lisandro Alzugaray (1)
Worst discipline	José Quintero (2) (red card)	Ricardo Adé (5) (yellow card); Sebastián González (5) (yellow card)	José Quintero (2) (red card)	Paolo Guerrero (1) (yellow card); Lucas Piovi (1) (yellow card)
Penalties for	9/10 (90%)	6/7 (85.71%)	3/3 (100%)	
Penalties against	6/9 (66.67%)	4/4 (100%)	2/5 (40%)	
League Points	64/96 (66.67%)	35/48 (2.08%)	29/48 (0%)	
Winning rate	54.35%	65.22%	45.45%	0%

As of March 7, 2023
Source: See Competitive matches (above)
