= 2026 Liga Deportiva Universitaria de Quito season =

LDU Quito
2026 season
- Manager: Tiago Nunes (until 16 July); Gustavo Álvarez (from 24 July)
- LigaPro First stage: 5th
- LigaPro Final stage: TBD
- Copa Ecuador: Quarter-finals
- Copa Libertadores: Quarter-finals
- Top goalscorer: Michael Estrada (6)

The 2026 season is Liga Deportiva Universitaria de Quito's 108th year of existence, featuring the club's participation in the Ecuadorian top division, the Copa Ecuador, and the Copa Libertadores.

== Transfers ==
=== In ===
Pos.	Player	Transferred from	Fee	Date	Source
DF	(Ecuador) Luis Segovia	(Brazil) Clube de Regatas Brasil	Free	6 January 2026	
MF	(Peru) Jesús Pretell	(Peru) Sporting Cristal	Undisclosed	8 January 2026	
FW	(Brazil) Deyverson	(Brazil) Fortaleza	Free	27 January 2026	
MF	(Ecuador) Iván Zambrano	(Ecuador) Libertad	Undisclosed	29 June 2026	
MF	(Ecuador) Juanse Rodríguez	(Portugal) Tondela	Loan return	30 June 2026	
DF	(Ecuador) José Carabalí	(Peru) Club Universitario de Deportes	$600,000 USD	30 June 2026	
MF	(Ecuador) Kevin Velasco	(Ecuador) Mushuc Runa	Free	7 July 2026	
MF	(Ecuador) Sebastián González	(United Arab Emirates) Shabab Al Ahli	Undiclosed	17 July 2026	
DF	(Argentina) Marcelo Weigandt	(Argentina) Boca Juniors	Loan	22 August 2026	
MF	(Argentina) Lucas Rodríguez	Unattached	Free	28 August 2026	

=== Out ===
Pos.	Player	Transferred to	Fee	Date	Source
MF	(Ecuador) Bryan Ramírez	(United States) FC Cincinnati	$3,000,000 USD	15 January 2026	
MF	(Ecuador) Kevin Minda	(Peru) FBC Melgar	Loan	1 July 2026	
FW	(Colombia) Jeison Medina	(Colombia) Independiente Medellín	Loan	15 July 2026	

== Friendlies ==
17 June 2026	LDU Quito	1–1	(Peru) Melgar

== Competitions ==
=== Overall record ===
Competition	First match	Last match	Starting round	Record							
Competition	First match	Last match	Starting round	Pld	W	D	L	GF	GA	GD	Win %
LigaPro First stage	24 February	12 September	Matchday 1	30	13	7	10	31	24	+7	43.33
LigaPro Final stage			Matchday 1	0	0	0	0	0	0	+0	—
Copa Ecuador	8 July		Round of 32	3	2	1	0	8	2	+6	66.67
Copa Libertadores	7 April		Group stage	9	4	2	3	9	7	+2	44.44
Total				42	19	10	13	48	33	+15	45.24

Source: Competitions

=== LigaPro ===
==== First stage ====
24 February 2026	Orense	1–2	LDU Quito

1 March 2026	LDU Quito	0–2	Macara

3 March 2026	LDU Quito	v	Barcelona

7 March 2026	Libertad	2–1	LDU Quito

14 March 2026	LDU Quito	1–1	Universidad Católica

17 March 2026	Leones	0–2	LDU Quito

21 March 2026	LDU Quito	1–0	Manta

3 April 2026	LDU Quito	0–2	Barcelona

10 April 2026	Delfin	1–0	LDU Quito

19 April 2026	Independiente del Valle	0–2	LDU Quito

22 April 2026	LDU Quito	0–0	Aucas

25 April 2026	Emelec	1–0	LDU Quito

2 May 2026	LDU Quito	1–0	Guayaquil City

11 May 2026	Mushuc Runa	1–3	LDU Quito

15 May 2026	LDU Quito	2–1	Técnico

23 May 2026	Cuenca	1–1	LDU Quito

1 July 2026	Macara	v	LDU Quito

1 July 2026	LDU Quito	3–0	Orense

5 July 2026	Macara	1–0	LDU Quito

12 July 2026	LDU Quito	0–0	Libertad

15 July 2026	LDU Quito	v	Leones

15 July 2026	Universidad Católica	1–0	LDU Quito

18 July 2026	LDU Quito	0–1	Leones

22 July 2026	Manta	1–1	LDU Quito

26 July 2026	Barcelona	0–1	LDU Quito

3 August 2026	LDU Quito	2–1	Delfin

7 August 2026	LDU Quito	0–2	Independiente del Valle

16 August 2026	Aucas	0–1	LDU Quito

23 August 2026	LDU Quito	2–0	Emelec

29 August 2026	Guayaquil City	2–1	LDU Quito

1 September 2026	LDU Quito	0–0	Mushuc Runa

4 September 2026	Técnico	1–3	LDU Quito

12 September 2026	LDU Quito	1–1	Cuenca

=== Copa Ecuador ===
8 July 2026 Round of 32	Independiente Juniors	2–2 (3–4 p)	LDU Quito

30 July 2026 Round of 16	LDU Quito	6–0	Leones

26 August 2026 Quarter-finals	LDU Quito	1–0	Aucas

=== Copa Libertadores ===
==== Group stage ====
Group G

Pos	Team	Pld	W	D	L	GF	GA	GD	Pts	Qualification
1	(Ecuador) LDU Quito	6	4	0	2	8	5	+3	12	Advance to round of 16
2	(Brazil) Mirassol	6	4	0	2	7	4	+3	12	Advance to round of 16
3	(Argentina) Lanús	6	3	0	3	3	7	−4	9	Transfer to Copa Sudamericana
4	(Bolivia) Always Ready	6	1	0	5	7	9	−2	3	

Source: CONMEBOL
Rules for classification: 1) Points; 2) Head-to-head points; 3) Head-to-head goal difference; 4) Head-to-head goals scored; 5) Goal difference; 6) Goals scored; 7) Red cards; 8) Yellow cards; 9) Drawing of lots.

7 April 2026 1	Always Ready (Bolivia)	0–1	(Ecuador) LDU Quito

14 April 2026 2	LDU Quito (Ecuador)	2–0	(Brazil) Mirassol

28 April 2026 3	Lanus (Argentina)	1–0	(Ecuador) LDU Quito

7 May 2026 4	Mirassol (Brazil)	2–0	(Ecuador) LDU Quito

20 May 2026 5	LDU Quito (Ecuador)	2–0	(Argentina) Lanus

26 May 2026 6	LDU Quito (Ecuador)	3–2	(Bolivia) Always Ready

==== Final stages ====
===== Round of 16 =====
13 August 2026 First leg	Mirassol (Brazil)	1–1	(Ecuador) LDU Quito

20 August 2026 Second leg	LDU Quito (Ecuador)	0–0 (5–4 p)	(Brazil) Mirassol

===== Quarter-finals =====
9 September 2026 First leg	Palmeiras (Brazil)	1–0	(Ecuador) LDU Quito	São Paulo
19:00				Stadium: Nubank Parque

16 September 2026 Second leg	LDU Quito (Ecuador)	v	(Brazil) Palmeiras	Quito
17:00				Stadium: Estadio Rodrigo Paz Delgado
