= Fernando Cornejo =

Fernando Cornejo may refer to:

- Fernando Cornejo (footballer, born 1969) (1969–2009), Chilean football midfielder
- Fernando Cornejo (footballer, born 1994), Chilean football defender
- Fernando Cornejo (footballer, born 1995), Chilean football midfielder
