= Rocafuerte FC =

Ecuadorian football club

Rocafuerte
- Full name: Rocafuerte Fútbol Club
- Nicknames: Los Cementeros, La Máquina Cementera, La Concretera, Emelec en Rojo
- Founded: August 14, 1994; 31 years ago
- Ground: Estadio Alejandro Ponce Noboa
- Capacity: 3,500
- Chairman: Efraín Vieira
- Manager: José Granda
- League: Segunda Categoría
- 2012: Serie B, 10th (relegated)
Home colours	Away colours

Rocafuerte Fútbol Club is a football club based in Guayaquil, Ecuador. They play in the Serie B, the second level of professional football in Ecuador.

== Current squad ==
Note: Flags indicate national team as defined under FIFA eligibility rules; some limited exceptions apply. Players may hold more than one non-FIFA nationality.

No.	Pos.	Nation	Player
1	GK	ECU	Jonathan Bonilla
2	DF	ECU	Jose Benites
3	DF	ECU	Harrinson Gomez
4	MF	ECU	Pablo Cifuentes
5	MF	ECU	Edison Caicedo
6	DF	ECU	Darwin Ordoñez
7	MF	ECU	Armando Angulo
8	MF	ECU	Eder Palacios
9	MF	ECU	Alexander Hurtado
10	MF	ECU	Leonardo Valencia
11	MF	ECU	Lorenzo Aviles
12	GK	ECU	Omar Estrada

No.	Pos.	Nation	Player
13	MF	ECU	Edin Vera
14	FW	ECU	Alex Perlaza
15	DF	ECU	Henry Lucin
16	MF	ECU	Darwin Moposita
17	MF	ECU	Adinton Mina
18	FW	ECU	Roberto Ordoñes
19	DF	ECU	Carlos Alberto Castro
20	MF	ECU	Marlon Ganchozo
51	MF	ECU	Kevin Arroyo
52	MF	ECU	Darwin Mina
54	MF	ECU	Kevin Bravo

== Achievements ==
- Campeonato de Segunda
  - Winner (1): 2008

== Women's section ==
The women's football section of Rocafuerte plays in the Ecuadoran league. It has won the national club title in 2013 and 2014. In the 2013 Copa Libertadores Femenina, the continental club championship, they finished third in their group.
