= Fernando Cornejo (footballer, born 1994) =

Chilean footballer

Personal information
- Full name: Fernando Esteban Cornejo Padilla
- Date of birth: 13 April 1994 (age 32)
- Place of birth: Santiago, Chile
- Height: 1.79 m (5 ft 10 in)
- Position: Centre-back

Youth career
- Unión Española

Senior career*
Years	Team	Apps	(Gls)
2012–2014	Unión Española B	37	(1)
2014–2018	Unión Española	31	(1)
2017	→ Barnechea (loan)	12	(1)
2018	→ Deportes Puerto Montt (loan)	14	(1)
2019–2021	Deportes Puerto Montt	42	(1)
2021–2022	San Luis	28	(0)
2023–2024	Deportes Recoleta	29	(1)
2025	Deportes Concepción	4	(0)
- * Club domestic league appearances and goals as of 24 December 2025

Fernando Esteban Cornejo Padilla (born 13 April 1994) is a Chilean footballer who plays as a centre-back.

== Career ==
A product of Unión Española youth system, Cornejo played for the B-team in the Chilean Segunda División before making his debut in the Chilean Primera División in 2014 against Santiago Wanderers. As a player of them, he also had stints on loan with Barnechea and Deportes Puerto Montt in 2017 and 2018, respectively.

After ending his contract with Unión Española, he played for Deportes Puerto Montt and San Luis de Quillota.

In 2023, Cornejo signed with Deportes Recoleta. In 2025, he switched to Deportes Concepción.
