= Alejandro Cabeza =

Ecuadorian footballer (born 1997)

Personal information
- Full name: Alejandro Jair Cabeza Jiménez
- Date of birth: 11 March 1997 (age 29)
- Place of birth: Esmeraldas, Ecuador
- Height: 1.85 m (6 ft 1 in)
- Position: Forward

Team information
- Current team: L.D.U. Quito
- Number: 24

Youth career
- Independiente del Valle

Senior career*
Years	Team	Apps	(Gls)
2016–2021	Independiente del Valle	86	(14)
2020	→ Aucas (loan)	22	(4)
2021	→ Emelec (loan)	26	(9)
2022–2023	Emelec	42	(10)
2023–2024	Sochi	1	(0)
2024	9 de Octubre	12	(0)
2024	El Nacional	11	(1)
2025–	L.D.U. Quito	14	(4)

International career
2017	Ecuador U20	1	(1)
2020	Ecuador U23	4	(0)
2019	Ecuador	1	(0)
- * Club domestic league appearances and goals as of 19 August 2025

Alejandro Jair Cabeza Jiménez (born 11 March 1997) is an Ecuadorian professional footballer who plays as a forward for Ecuadorian Serie A club L.D.U. Quito.

== Club career ==
A youth academy graduate of Independiente del Valle, Cabeza made his first team debut on 20 July 2016 in a 5–2 league defeat against El Nacional. He scored his first goal on 4 December 2016 in a 2–1 league win against Fuerza Amarilla.

On 6 January 2021, Cabeza was loaned to C.S. Emelec from Independente del Valle.

On 24 October 2023, Cabeza signed for Russian Premier League club Sochi.

== International career ==
Cabeza received maiden call-up to senior team in November 2019 for friendlies against Trinidad and Tobago and Colombia. He made his senior team debut on 15 November 2019 in 3–0 win against Trinidad and Tobago.

== Career statistics ==
=== Club ===
As of match played 10 December 2023

Appearances and goals by club, season and competition
Club	Season	League			National cup		Continental		Other		Total	
Club	Season	Division	Apps	Goals	Apps	Goals	Apps	Goals	Apps	Goals	Apps	Goals
Independiente	2016	Ecuadorian Serie A	9	2	0	0	—		—		9	2
Independiente	2017	Ecuadorian Serie A	15	1	0	0	1 (Note: Appearances in Copa Libertadores)	0	—		16	1
Independiente	2018	Ecuadorian Serie A	32	7	0	0	0	0	—		32	7
Independiente	2019	Ecuadorian Serie A	26	2	2	0	11 (Note: Appearances in Copa Sudamericana)	4	—		39	6
Independiente	2020	Ecuadorian Serie A	4	2	0	0	2 (Note: Appearances in Recopa Sudamericana)	0	—		6	2
Independiente	Total		86	14	2	0	14	4	0	0	102	18
Aucas (loan)	2020	Ecuadorian Serie A	22	3	0	0	—		—		22	3
Emelec (loan)	2021	Ecuadorian Serie A	26	9	0	0	8	1	1 (Note: Appearance in Supercopa Ecuador)	0	35	10
Emelec	2022	Ecuadorian Serie A	27	7	2	0	8	3	0	0	37	10
Emelec	2023	Ecuadorian Serie A	15	3	0	0	7	2	0	0	22	5
Emelec	Total		42	10	2	0	15	5	0	0	59	15
Orenburg	2023–24	Russian Premier League	1	0	0	0	—		—		1	0
Career total			177	36	4	0	37	10	1	0	219	46

=== International ===
As of 15 November 2019

Appearances and goals by national team and year
National team	Year	Apps	Goals
Ecuador	2019	1	0
Total		1	0

== Honours ==
Independiente del Valle

- Copa Sudamericana: 2019
