= Vitamina Sánchez =

Argentine footballer and manager

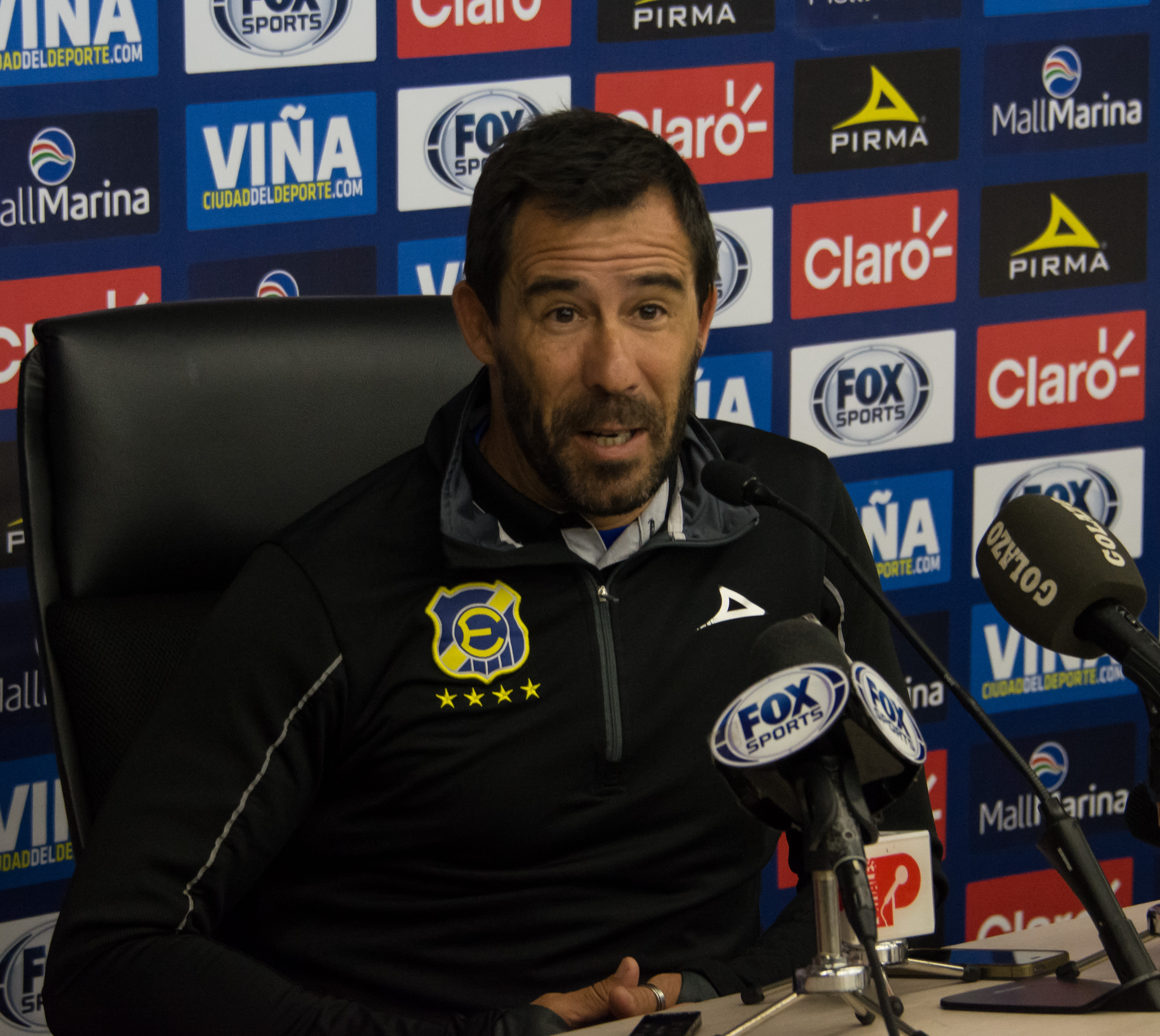
- Sánchez in 2018

Personal information
- Full name: Pablo Andrés Sánchez Spucches
- Date of birth: 3 January 1973 (age 53)
- Place of birth: Rosario, Argentina
- Height: 1.77 m (5 ft 10 in)
- Position: Midfielder

Team information
- Current team: Olimpia (manager)

Youth career
- Rosario Central

Senior career*
Years	Team	Apps	(Gls)
1992–1996	Rosario Central	85	(15)
1996–1999	Feyenoord	51	(20)
1999	→ Alavés (loan)	18	(1)
1999	Harelbeke	1	(0)
1999–2000	Gimnasia LP	17	(3)
2000–2005	Rosario Central	81	(2)
2005	Quilmes	9	(0)
Total		262	(41)

Managerial career
- 2007: Banfield
- 2008: Rosario Central
- 2009: Oriente Petrolero
- 2013–2014: Universidad Concepción
- 2015: O'Higgins
- 2016–2018: Everton Viña del Mar
- 2019: Deportes Iquique
- 2019–2020: Oriente Petrolero
- 2020–2021: Audax Italiano
- 2023–2024: Palestino
- 2024–2025: LDU Quito
- 2026–: Olimpia
- * Club domestic league appearances and goals

Pablo Andrés Sánchez Spucches (born 3 January 1973), nicknamed Vitamina, is an Argentine former player who played as a midfielder, and the current manager of Paraguayan club Olimpia.

He spent his 13-year professional career in four countries. In 2007, he started working as a manager.

== Honours ==
Universidad Concepción

- Primera B: 2013

LDU Quito

- Serie A: 2024
- Supercopa Ecuador: 2025

== Playing career ==
Born in Rosario, Santa Fe, Sánchez started playing for Rosario Central, before moving to Feyenoord in 1996. He scored a career-best 16 goals in his first season in the Eredivisie, helping the Rotterdam team to a final runner-up place. Later, he represented briefly Deportivo Alavés from Spain and Belgian side RC Harelbeke.

Sánchez returned home in 1999, first with Club de Gimnasia y Esgrima La Plata then with his first club Rosario. After being told by coach Ángel Tulio Zof he was not needed he signed with Quilmes Atlético Club, but suffered a serious shoulder injury shortly after, having to retire from the sport at 32.

== Coaching career ==
Sánchez began his managerial career at Club Atlético Banfield, helping the team avoid relegation from the Primera División. He also managed Rosario Central for nine games, until he was fired on 6 October 2008.

In February 2009, Sánchez agreed to take charge of Bolivian Primera División club Oriente Petrolero, being relieved of his duties in early October of that year. On 5 December 2012 he moved countries again, being appointed at C.D. Universidad de Concepción in Chile.

Sánchez continued to work in the Chilean Primera División the following years, being in charge of O'Higgins FC, Everton de Viña del Mar and Deportes Iquique. One decade after leaving, he returned to both the Bolivian top tier and Oriente.

On 24 October 2022, Palestino announced an agreement with Sánchez to become the club manager since December 2022 replacing Gustavo Costas.
