= Enzo López =

Argentine footballer

Personal information
- Full name: Enzo Adrián López
- Date of birth: 10 March 1998 (age 28)
- Place of birth: Paraná, Argentina
- Height: 1.78 m (5 ft 10 in)
- Position: Forward

Youth career
- Sportivo Urquiza
- Patronato
- –2017: Lanús

Senior career*
Years	Team	Apps	(Gls)
2017–2019	Lanús II		
2019–2023	Lanús	0	(0)
2019–2020	→ Mitre (loan)	4	(1)
2020–2021	→ Talleres (RE) (loan)	4	(0)
2021	→ Los Andes (loan)	33	(9)
2022	→ Güemes (loan)	26	(4)
2023–2024	Deportivo Cuenca	26	(4)
2024–2026	Botoșani	59	(12)
- * Club domestic league appearances and goals as of 16 May 2026

Enzo Adrián López (born 10 March 1998) is an Argentine professional footballer who plays as a forward.
