= Darío Aimar =

Ecuadorian footballer (born 1995)

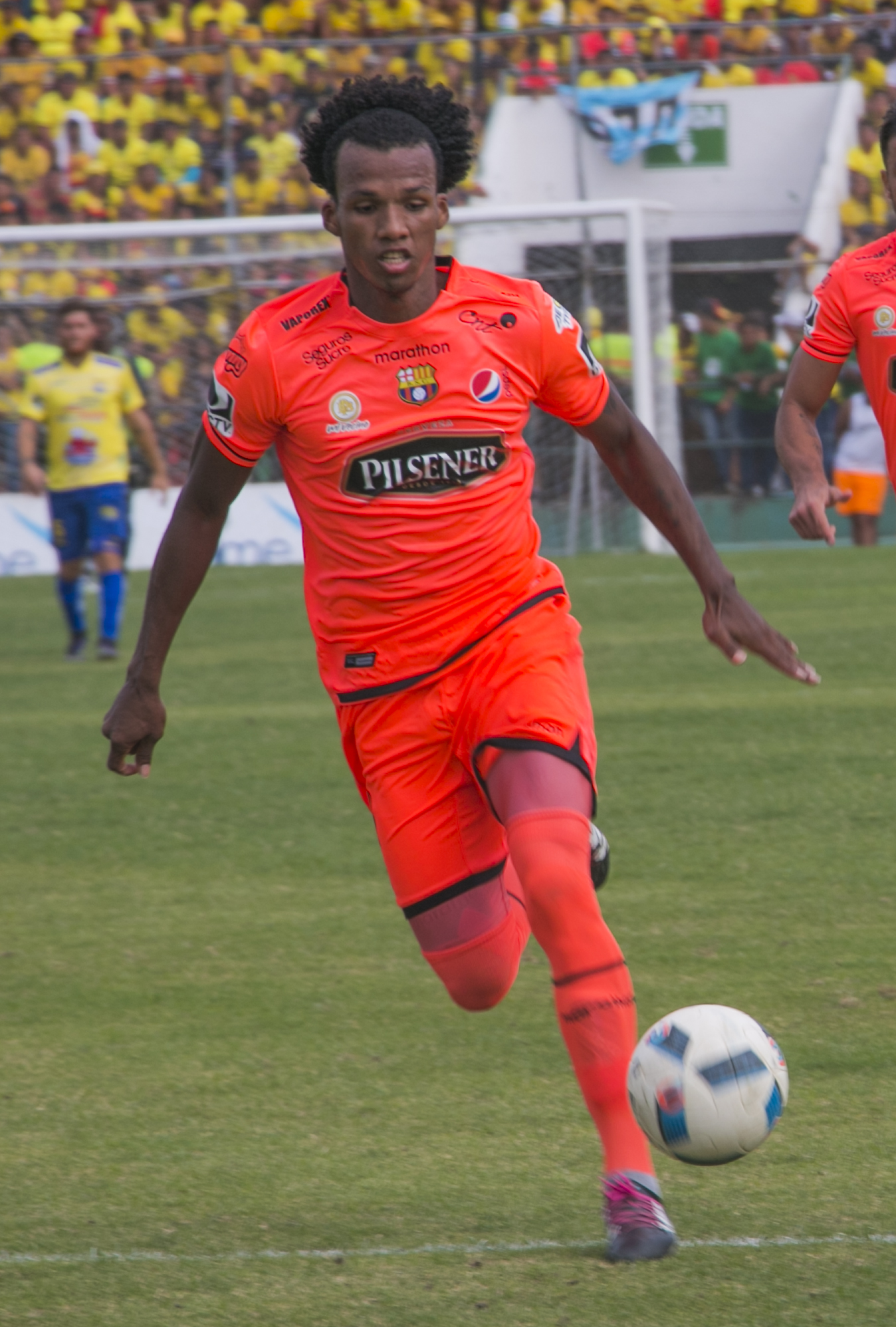
- Aimar with Barcelona S.C. in July 2016

Personal information
- Full name: Darío Javier Aimar Alvarez
- Date of birth: 5 January 1995 (age 31)
- Place of birth: Quinindé, Ecuador
- Height: 1.86 m (6 ft 1 in)
- Position: Defender

Team information
- Current team: Delfín S.C.

Senior career*
Years	Team	Apps	(Gls)
2013–2015	LDU Loja	16	(1)
2015–2022	Barcelona SC	122	(5)
2023	S.D. Aucas	7	(0)
2023	Guayaquil City F.C.	13	(0)
2024	The Strongest	25	(1)
2025	L.D.U. Quito	7	(1)
2026–	Delfín	5	(0)

International career^{‡}
2017–2019	Ecuador	7	(0)
- * Club domestic league appearances and goals as of 19 August 2025 ‡ National team caps and goals as of 13 October 2019

Darío Javier Aimar Alvarez (born 5 January 1995) is an Ecuadorian footballer who plays as a defender for Ecuadorian Serie A side Delfin Sporting Club and the Ecuador national team. He made his debut for Ecuador on 22 February 2017 in a match against Honduras.

== Honors ==
Barcelona SC

- Serie A (2): 2016, 2020
