= Gian Franco Allala =

Uruguayan footballer (born 1997)

Personal information
- Full name: Gian Franco Allala Menéndez
- Date of birth: 17 January 1997 (age 29)
- Place of birth: Juan Lacaze, Uruguay
- Height: 1.87 m (6 ft 2 in)
- Position: Centre-back

Team information
- Current team: LDU Quito
- Number: 30

Youth career
- C.A. Reformers
- 2012–2015: Liverpool Montevideo

Senior career*
Years	Team	Apps	(Gls)
2015–2017	Rampla Juniors	6	(0)
2017	→ Oriental (loan)	14	(2)
2017–2019	Sud América	33	(1)
2019–2020	Cádiz B	1	(0)
2019–2020	→ Izarra (loan)	12	(1)
2020–2021	Miramar Misiones		
2021	Central Español	15	(1)
2022	Defensor Sporting	1	(0)
2022	Atenas	11	(1)
2023–2024	Boston River	44	(4)
2024–	LDU Quito	25	(0)

International career^{‡}
2024–	Uruguay A'	1	(0)
- * Club domestic league appearances and goals as of 19 August 2025 ‡ National team caps and goals as of 31 May 2024

Gian Franco Allala Menéndez (born 17 January 1997) is a Uruguayan professional footballer who plays as a centre-back for Ecuadorean club LDU Quito.

== International career ==
In May 2024, Allala was named in the first ever Uruguay A' national team squad. He made his Uruguay A' debut on 31 May 2024 in a goalless draw against Costa Rica.

== Career statistics ==
=== Club ===
As of 28 July 2020.

Club	Season	League			Cup		Continental		Other		Total	
Club	Season	Division	Apps	Goals	Apps	Goals	Apps	Goals	Apps	Goals	Apps	Goals
Rampla Juniors	2015–16	Segunda División	6	0	0	0	–		3 (Note: Appearances in the Segunda División playoffs)	0	9	0
Rampla Juniors	2016	Primera División	0	0	0	0	–		0	0	0	0
Rampla Juniors	2017	Primera División	0	0	0	0	–		0	0	0	0
Rampla Juniors	Total		6	0	0	0	0	0	3	0	9	0
Club Oriental (loan)	2017	Segunda División	14	2	0	0	–		0	0	14	2
Sud América	2017	Primera División	8	0	0	0	–		0	0	8	0
Sud América	2018	Segunda División	25	1	0	0	–		0	0	25	1
Sud América	Total		33	1	0	0	0	0	0	0	33	1
Cádiz CF B	2018–19	Tercera División	1	0	0	0	–		0	0	1	0
Cádiz CF B	2019–20	Segunda División B	0	0	0	0	–		0	0	0	0
Cádiz CF B	Total		1	0	0	0	0	0	0	0	1	0
CD Izarra (loan)	2019–20	Segunda División B	12	1	0	0	–		0	0	12	1
Career total			66	4	0	0	0	0	3	0	69	4
