= Gonzalo Valle =

Ecuadorian footballer (born 1996)

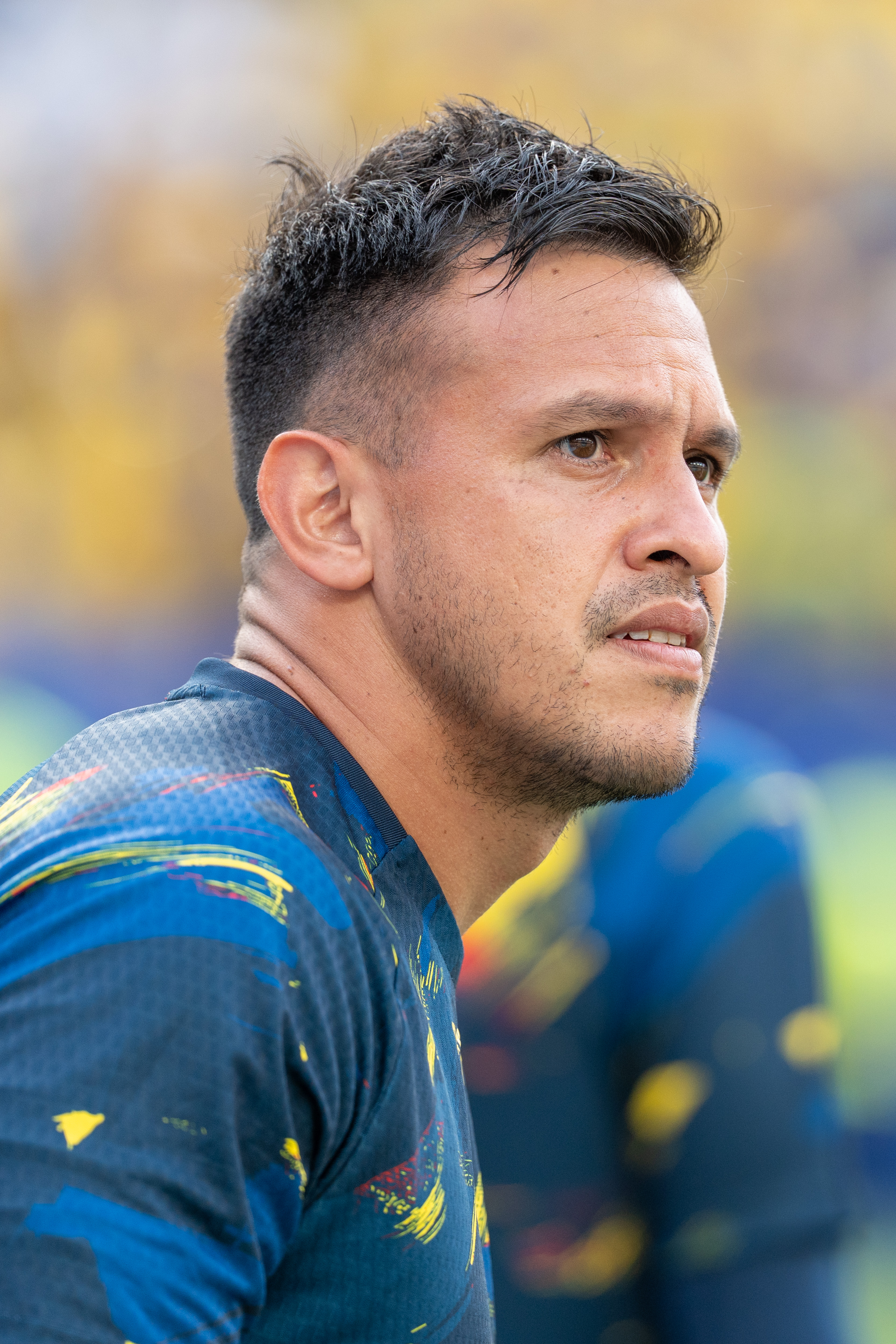
- Valle with Ecuador in 2026

Personal information
- Full name: Gonzalo Roberto Valle Bustamante
- Date of birth: 28 February 1996 (age 30)
- Place of birth: Riobamba, Ecuador
- Height: 1.85 m (6 ft 1 in)
- Position: Goalkeeper

Team information
- Current team: LDU Quito
- Number: 1

Youth career
- 2014–2017: Guayaquil City

Senior career*
Years	Team	Apps	(Gls)
2017–2024	Guayaquil City	111	(0)
2024–	LDU Quito	42	(0)

International career^{‡}
2025–	Ecuador	4	(0)
Medal record
Men's football
Representing Ecuador
Bolivarian Games
Silver medal – second place	2013 Trujillo	Team
- * Club domestic league appearances and goals as of 11 October 2026 ‡ National team caps and goals as of 5 October 2026

Gonzalo Roberto Valle Bustamante (born 28 February 1996) is an Ecuadorian professional footballer who plays as a goalkeeper for Ecuadorian Serie A side L.D.U. Quito and the Ecuador national team.

== Club career ==
From Riobamba, he joined Guayaquil City in 2014, making his first-team debut in 2017. He featured for the club in the Copa Sudamericana for the first time in March 2021. He joined L.D.U. Quito in January 2024. He made his debut in the Copa Sudamericana for Quito on 15 August 2024 against Club Atlético Lanús.

== International career ==
Valle was called up to train with the Ecuador national team for the first time in August 2022. He was called up again in October 2024. He made his debut for Ecuador, keeping a clean sheet, in a 0–0 draw in their 2026 FIFA World Cup qualification match against Brazil on 5 June 2025.

On 31 May 2026, Valle was selected in the 26-man squad for the 2026 FIFA World Cup.

== Career statistics ==
=== Club ===
As of match played 11 October 2026

Appearances and goals by club, season and competition
Club	Season	League			Cup		Continental		Other		Total	
Club	Season	Division	Apps	Goals	Apps	Goals	Apps	Goals	Apps	Goals	Apps	Goals
Guayaquil City	2015	LigaPro Serie A	0	0	—		—		—		0	0
Guayaquil City	2016	LigaPro Serie A	0	0	—		—		—		0	0
Guayaquil City	2017	LigaPro Serie A	12	0	—		—		—		12	0
Guayaquil City	2018	LigaPro Serie A	5	0	—		—		—		5	0
Guayaquil City	2019	LigaPro Serie A	17	0	0	0	—		—		17	0
Guayaquil City	2020	LigaPro Serie A	7	0	—		—		—		7	0
Guayaquil City	2021	LigaPro Serie A	13	0	—		1	0	—		14	0
Guayaquil City	2022	LigaPro Serie A	29	0	0	0	—		—		29	0
Guayaquil City	2023	LigaPro Serie A	28	0	—		—		—		28	0
Guayaquil City	Total		111	0	0	0	1	0	—		112	0
LDU Quito	2024	LigaPro Serie A	3	0	1	0	2	0	0	0	6	0
LDU Quito	2025	LigaPro Serie A	14	0	0	0	10	0	—		24	0
LDU Quito	2026	LigaPro Serie A	25	0	2	0	10	0	—		37	0
LDU Quito	Total		42	0	3	0	22	0	—		67	0
Career total			153	0	3	0	23	0	0	0	179	0

=== International ===
As of match played 5 October 2026

Appearances and goals by national team and year
National team	Year	Apps	Goals
Ecuador	2025	2	0
Ecuador	2026	2	0
Total		4	0
