= Lisandro Alzugaray =

Argentine professional footballer

Personal information
- Full name: Lisandro Joel Alzugaray
- Date of birth: 17 April 1990 (age 36)
- Place of birth: Viale, Argentina
- Height: 1.70 m (5 ft 7 in)
- Position: Winger

Team information
- Current team: Universitario de Deportes
- Number: 30

Youth career
- Lanús

Senior career*
Years	Team	Apps	(Gls)
2009–2013	Atlético Paraná	87	(29)
2013–2014	Chaco For Ever	27	(1)
2014–2016	Atlético Paraná	76	(9)
2017	San José	18	(6)
2017–2018	Chaco For Ever	14	(2)
2018–2019	Newell's Old Boys	4	(0)
2019–2020	Central Córdoba	18	(4)
2020	Aucas	18	(6)
2021–2022	Universidad Católica	36	(20)
2022	Al Ahli	0	(0)
2023–2025	L.D.U. Quito	88	(19)
2026-	Universitario de Deportes	19	(4)
- * Club domestic league appearances and goals as of 19 August 2025

Lisandro Joel Alzugaray (born 17 April 1990) is an Argentine professional footballer who plays as a winger for Universitario de Deportes.

== Career ==
Alzugaray got his senior career underway with a four-year spell with Atlético Paraná, having played for Lanús at youth level. He was first moved into the first-team for the 2009–10 Torneo Argentino C campaign, but failed to feature as the club were promoted to Torneo Argentino B. Alzugaray made his first appearances during the following campaign, eventually scoring twenty-nine goals in eighty-seven matches for Atlético Paraná. On 9 July 2013, Alzugaray signed for Chaco For Ever of Torneo Argentino A. He made his debut against Juventud Unida on 18 August, prior to scoring his first goal in March 2014 versus San Jorge.

He completed a return to a recently promoted Torneo Federal A club Atlético Paraná on 30 June 2014. He netted five times in the 2014 season as the club won back-to-back promotions, beating Sportivo Patria in the play-offs for a spot in the 2015 Primera B Nacional. He subsequently played in sixty-three second tier fixtures and scored four goals across the next three campaigns. January 2017 saw Alzugaray leave his homeland for the first time after agreeing to join Bolivian Primera División team San José. He departed nine months later, rejoining Torneo Federal A's Chaco For Ever. Two goals in seventeen games came.

On 8 August 2018, Alzugaray completed a move to Argentine Primera División side Newell's Old Boys. His debut arrived on 25 October against Estudiantes, which was one of four appearances for the club before he departed to Central Córdoba in July 2019. After scoring goals in 2019–20 versus Talleres, Villa Mitre (cup), San Lorenzo (2) and Arsenal de Sarandí, Alzugaray headed abroad for a second time after signing with Ecuadorian Serie A outfit Aucas in July 2020. He netted against Mushuc Runa, Emelec, Guayaquil City, Independiente del Valle, Macará and Barcelona as they qualified for the Copa Sudamericana.

On 26 December 2020, Alzugaray was announced as a new signing for 2021 by fellow Ecuadorian top-flight club Universidad Católica; who had just secured a place in the Copa Libertadores.

On 1 August 2022, Alzugaray joined Saudi Arabian club Al Ahli on a one-year deal.

== Career statistics ==
As of 14 May 2024.

Club statistics
Club	Season	League			Cup		League Cup		Continental		Other		Total	
Club	Season	Division	Apps	Goals	Apps	Goals	Apps	Goals	Apps	Goals	Apps	Goals	Apps	Goals
Chaco For Ever	2013–14	Torneo Argentino A	27	1	3	0	—		—		2 (Note: Appearance(s) in the Torneo Argentino A play-offs)	0	32	1
Atlético Paraná	2014	Torneo Federal A	13	5	0	0	—		—		3 (Note: Appearance(s) in the Torneo Federal A play-offs)	0	16	5
Atlético Paraná	2015	Primera B Nacional	33	1	0	0	—		—		0	0	33	1
Atlético Paraná	2016	Primera B Nacional	21	3	1	1	—		—		0	0	22	4
Atlético Paraná	2016–17	Primera B Nacional	9	0	0	0	—		—		0	0	9	0
Atlético Paraná	Total		76	9	1	1	—		—		3	0	80	10
San José	2016–17	Bolivian Primera División	18	6	—		—		—		0	0	18	6
Chaco For Ever	2017–18	Torneo Federal A	14	2	0	0	—		—		3	0	17	2
Newell's Old Boys	2018–19	Argentine Primera División	4	0	0	0	0	0	—		0	0	4	0
Central Córdoba	2019–20	Argentine Primera División	18	4	6	1	1	0	—		0	0	25	5
Aucas	2020	Ecuadorian Serie A	18	6	0	0	—		0	0	0	0	18	6
Universidad Católica	2021	Ecuadorian Serie A	22	15	0	0	—		4	0	0	0	26	15
Universidad Católica	2022	Ecuadorian Serie A	14	5	0	0	—		7	0	0	0	21	5
Universidad Católica	Total		36	20	0	0	0	0	11	0	0	0	47	20
L.D.U. Quito	2023	Ecuadorian Serie A	30	5	0	0	—		11	4	0	0	41	9
L.D.U. Quito	2024	Ecuadorian Serie A	7	3	0	0	—		6	1	0	0	13	4
L.D.U. Quito	Total		37	8	0	0	—		17	5	0	0	54	13
Career total			248	56	10	2	1	0	28	5	8	0	295	63

== Honours ==
Liga de Quito

- Serie A: 2023, 2024
- 2025 Supercopa Ecuador
- Copa Sudamericana: 2023
