= Lautaro Pastrán =

Argentine-Chilean footballer

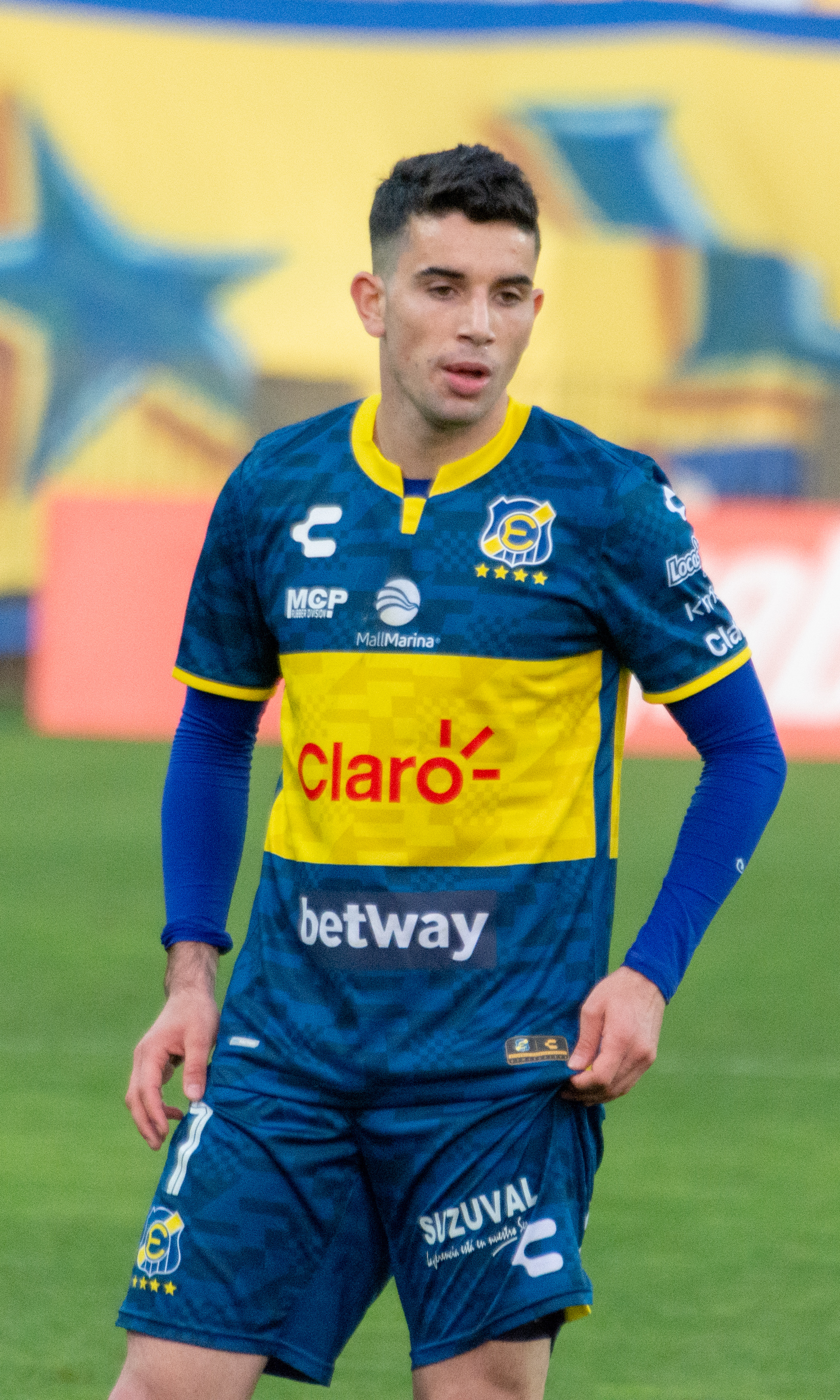
- Pastrán with Everton in 2023

Personal information
- Full name: Lautaro Leonel Pastrán Tello
- Date of birth: June 27, 2002 (age 24)
- Place of birth: Mendoza, Argentina
- Height: 1.73 m (5 ft 8 in)
- Position: Winger

Team information
- Current team: Colo-Colo (on loan from Belgrano)

Youth career
- Godoy Cruz
- 2016–2020: River Plate
- 2021–2022: Everton

Senior career*
Years	Team	Apps	(Gls)
2022–2023	Everton	30	(6)
2023–	Belgrano	16	(0)
2024	→ Everton (loan)	13	(3)
2025	→ LDU Quito (loan)	34	(2)
2026–	→ Colo-Colo (loan)	0	(0)
- * Club domestic league appearances and goals as of 29 January 2026

Lautaro Leonel Pastrán Tello (born 27 June 2002) is an Argentine-Chilean footballer who plays as a winger for Chilean club Colo-Colo on loan from Belgrano.

== Club career ==
As a youth player, Pastrán was with Godoy Cruz in his city of birth and switched to River Plate at the age of fourteen.

In February 2021, he moved to Chile and joined Everton de Viña del Mar, making his professional debut in a Copa Sudamericana match against São Paulo on 5 May. In July 2022, he signed his first professional contract.

In August 2023, Pastrán returned to Argentina and joined Belgrano in the top division on a deal until December 2026. In the second half of 2024, he was loaned out to Everton until the end of the season with an option to buy. In 2025, he moved on loan to Ecuadorian club LDU Quito on a one-year deal with an option to buy. The next season, he was loaned out to Colo-Colo.

== International career ==
Pastrán was called up to the training microcycle on November and December 2022 of the Chile under-23 national team with views to the 2023 Pan American Games and took part in a training match against Deportes Linares, where he scored a goal.

== Personal life ==
His parents are Angie Tello and Gustavo and has three brothers called Gonzalo, Ezequiel and Tiziano.

In September 2022, Pastrán naturalized Chilean by descent since his grandmother is Chilean.
