= Daniel de la Cruz =

Ecuadorian footballer (born 2004)

Personal information
- Full name: Daniel Isaí de la Cruz de la Cruz
- Date of birth: 6 March 2004 (age 22)
- Place of birth: Quito, Ecuador
- Height: 1.82 m (6 ft 0 in)
- Position: Winger

Team information
- Current team: Nacional (on loan from LDU Quito)
- Number: 2

Youth career
- –2024: LDU Quito

Senior career*
Years	Team	Apps	(Gls)
2024–	LDU Quito	40	(1)
2026–	→ Nacional (loan)	4	(0)

International career^{‡}
2022–2023	Ecuador U20	14	(0)
- * Club domestic league appearances and goals as of 12 September 2026 ‡ National team caps and goals as of 00:15, 15 January 2024 (UTC)

Daniel Isaí de la Cruz de la Cruz (born 6 March 2004) is an Ecuadorean footballer who plays for Primeira Liga club Nacional on loan from LDU Quito.

== Career ==
He was promoted to the first team squad at LDU Quito in 2024. He made his debut for Quito in July 2024 in the Copa Ecuador and in Ecuadorian Serie A against C.S.D. Macará on 4 August 2024.

On 8 July 2026, de la Cruz was loaned by Nacional in Portugal for the 2026–27 season.

== International career ==
He was selected by Ecuador to represent them at the 2023 South American U-20 Championship. Later that same year he was chosen for the 2023 FIFA U-20 World Cup, starting in Argentina in May 2023.

== Style of play ==
He made his first appearances for Quito playing on the right wing.

== Personal life ==
He is the son of former international footballer Ulises de la Cruz. He is the cousin of Maiky de la Cruz.

== Honors ==
Liga de Quito

- Serie A: 2024
