= Ángel Ledesma =

Ecuadorian footballer (born 1993)

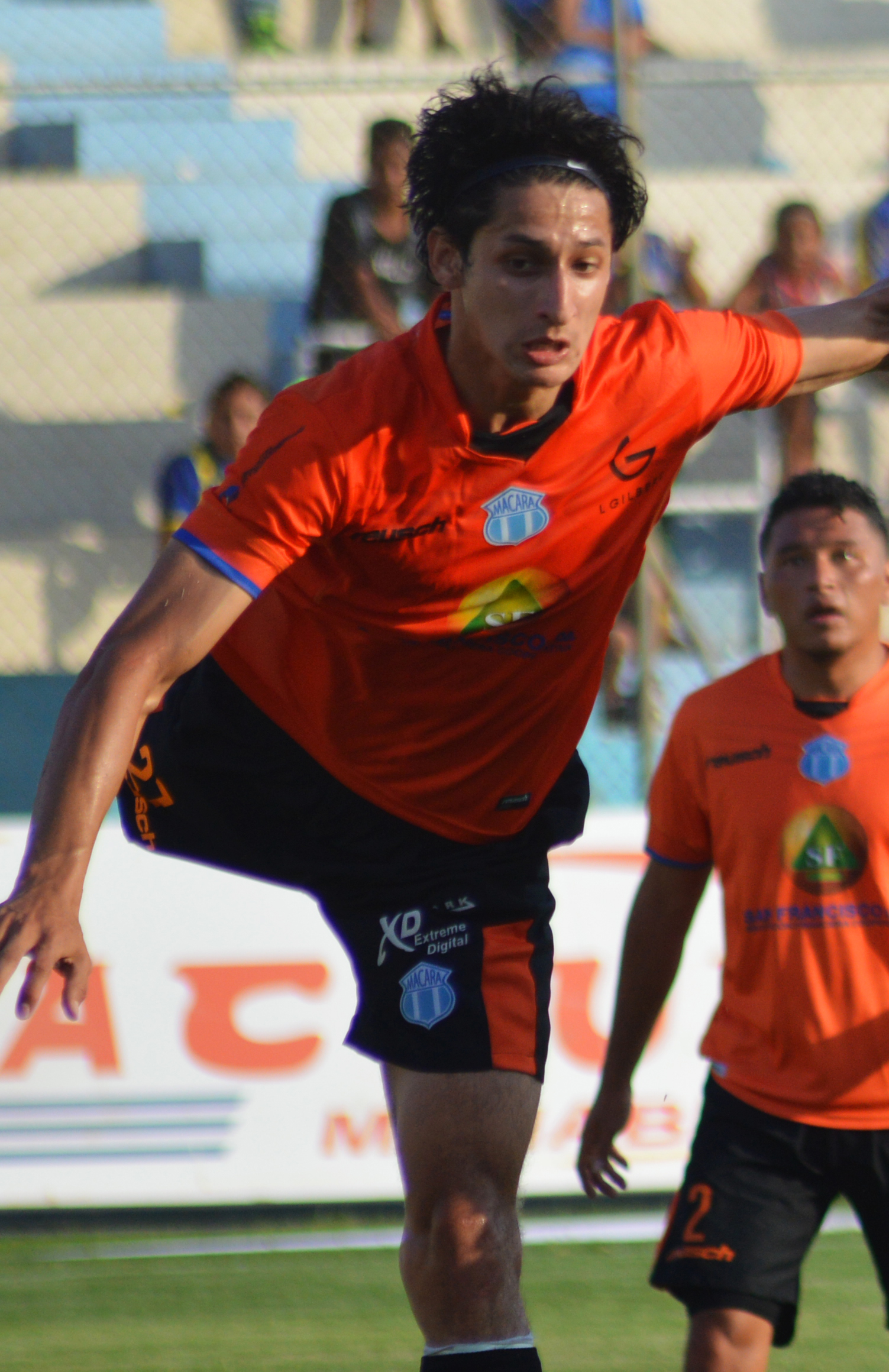
- Ledesma playing for Macará in 2015

Personal information
- Full name: Ángel Alexander Ledesma Félix
- Date of birth: June 22, 1992 (age 34)
- Place of birth: Quevedo, Ecuador
- Height: 1.86 m (6 ft 1 in)
- Position: Midfielder

Team information
- Current team: Manta
- Number: 28

Youth career
- 2008–2010: Macará

Senior career*
Years	Team	Apps	(Gls)
2010–2017	Macará	137	(31)
2011	→ LDU Quito (loan)	3	(0)
2015	→ Aucas (loan)	17	(1)
2017–2019	América de Quito	23	(11)
2018–2019	→ Delfín S.C. (loan)	6	(0)
2019–2024	Manta	130	(44)
2024–2025	Los Chankas	32	(6)
2025	El Nacional	11	(1)
2025–2026	Macará	19	(4)
2026	Alianza Universidad	10	(5)
2026–	Manta	8	(1)
- * Club domestic league appearances and goals as of 24 October 2026

Ángel Alexander Ledesma Félix (born June 22, 1992) is an Ecuadorian footballer who plays for Manta. He made his professional debut while playing for Macará in 2010.

== Honours ==
Macará

- Ecuadorian Serie B: 2016
