= David Cabezas =

Ecuadorian footballer (born 1995)

Personal information
- Full name: David Estalin Cabezas Medina
- Date of birth: 12 June 1995 (age 31)
- Place of birth: Santo Domingo, Ecuador
- Height: 1.86 m (6 ft 1 in)
- Position: Goalkeeper

Team information
- Current team: Libertad
- Number: 12

Youth career
- Clan Juvenil
- 2012–2017: El Nacional
- 2016: →Pelileo (loan)

Senior career*
Years	Team	Apps	(Gls)
2017–2025	El Nacional	97	(0)
2026–	Libertad	6	(0)

International career^{‡}
2026–	Ecuador	1	(0)
- * Club domestic league appearances and goals as of 23:13, 21 March 2026 (UTC) ‡ National team caps and goals as of 22:42, 31 March 2026 (UTC)

David Estalin Cabezas Medina (born 12 June 1995) is an Ecuadorian professional footballer who plays as a goalkeeper for the Ecuadorian Serie A club El Nacional and the Ecuador national team.

== Club career ==
A youth product of Clan Juvenil, Cabezas moved to El Nacional in 2012 where he finished his development. He was their backup goalkeeperstarting in 2017, and in 2019 made his senior debut in the Ecuadorian Serie A. In the 2022 season, he was named the starting goalkeeper, captain, and even played as striker as they won the 2022 Ecuadorian Serie B. On 27 November 2024, he helped El Nacional win the 2024 Copa Ecuador in a 1–0 win over Independiente del Valle. On 1 January 2025, he extended his contract with El Nacional for an additional season. On 23 October 2025, Cabezas announced he would permanently leave El Nacional for non-football reasons.

== International career ==
In June 2025, Cabezas was called up to the Ecuador national team for the first time for a set of 2026 FIFA World Cup qualification matches.

== Career statistics ==
=== International ===
As of match played 31 March 2026

Appearances and goals by national team and year
National team	Year	Apps	Goals
Ecuador	2026	1	0
Total		1	0

== Honours ==
El Nacional

- Ecuadorian Serie B: 2022
- Copa Ecuador: 2024
