= Edison Caicedo =

Ecuadorian footballer (born 1990)

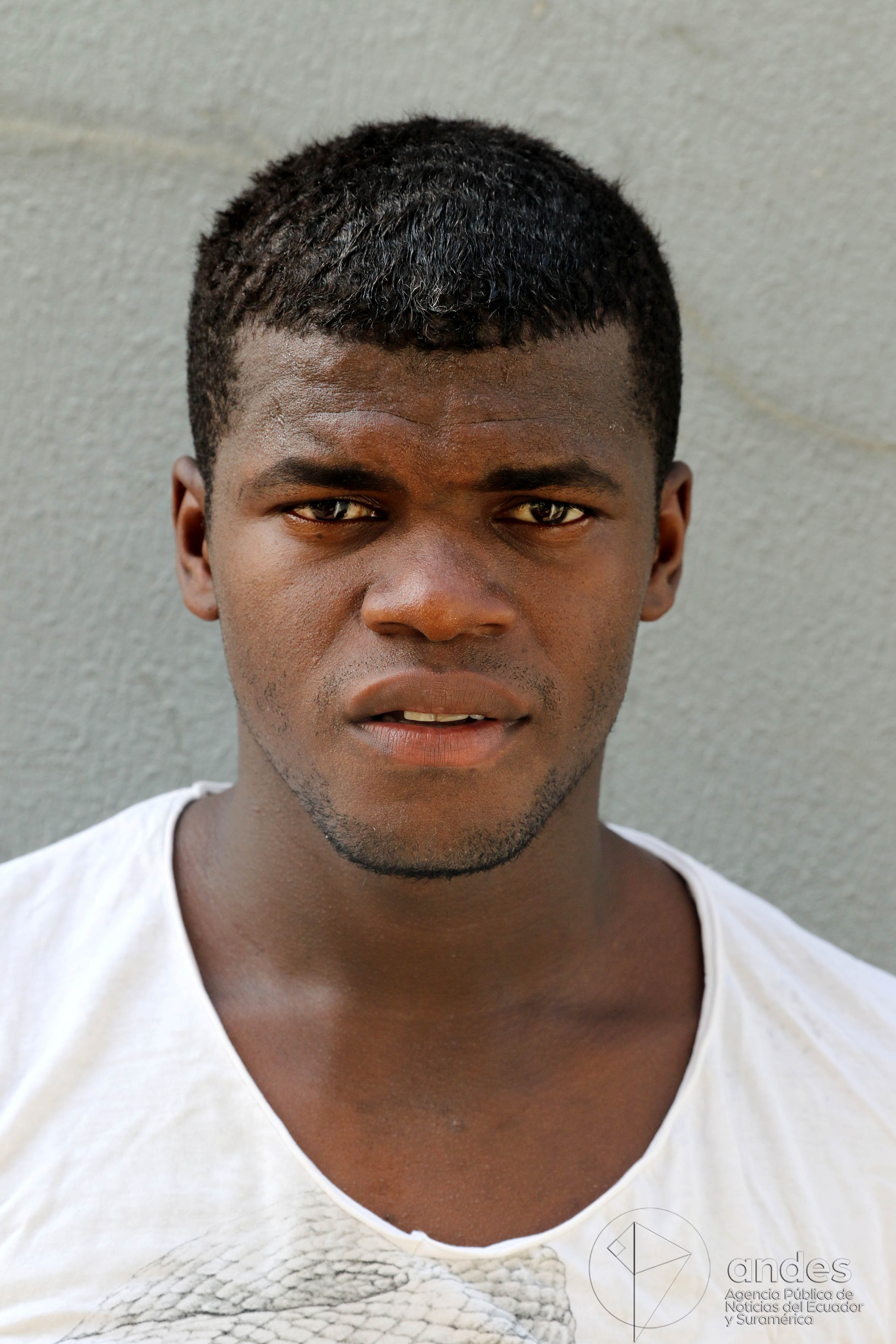

Personal information
- Full name: Edison Armando Caicedo Castro
- Date of birth: 13 March 1990 (age 36)
- Place of birth: Esmeraldas, Ecuador
- Height: 1.70 m (5 ft 7 in)
- Position: Full back

Team information
- Current team: El Nacional

Senior career*
Years	Team	Apps	(Gls)
2007–2009	Macará	?	
2010	→ Cuniburo (loan)	?	(0)
2011–2012	Rocafuerte	?	(0)
2013	Grecia de Chone	?	(0)
2014–2018	Guayaquil City	111	(2)
2019	Delfín	8	(0)
2020–2022	Orense	4	(0)
2022–2023	Aucas	0	(0)
2024	Técnico Universitario	0	(0)
- * Club domestic league appearances and goals as of 18:59, 26 July 2020 (UTC)

Edison Armando Caicedo Castro (born March 13, 1990) is an Ecuadorian footballer currently playing for C.D. El Nacional
