= Alexander Domínguez =

Ecuadorian footballer (born 1987)

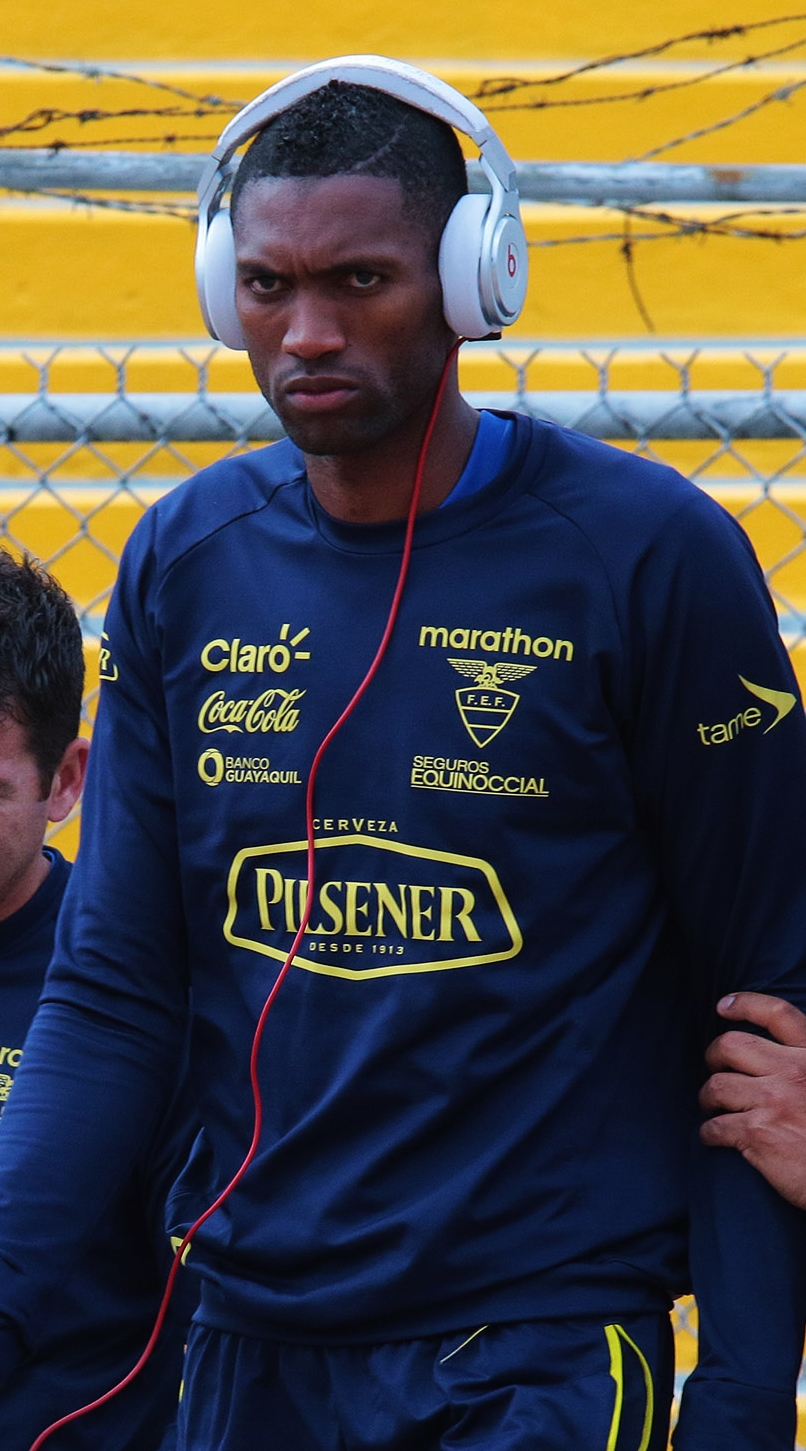
- Domínguez with Ecuador in 2015

Personal information
- Full name: Alexander Domínguez Carabalí
- Date of birth: 5 June 1987 (age 39)
- Place of birth: Esmeraldas, Ecuador
- Height: 1.95 m (6 ft 5 in)
- Position: Goalkeeper

Team information
- Current team: L.D.U. Quito
- Number: 22

Youth career
- 2005: Esmeraldas Club
- 2006–2009: L.D.U. Quito

Senior career*
Years	Team	Apps	(Gls)
2006–2016	L.D.U. Quito	292	(0)
2016–2018	Monterrey	9	(0)
2017–2018	→ Colón (loan)	27	(0)
2018–2021	Vélez Sarsfield	29	(0)
2021	Cerro Largo	13	(0)
2022	Deportes Tolima	9	(0)
2022–	L.D.U. Quito	91	(0)

International career^{‡}
2011–2024	Ecuador	77	(0)
- * Club domestic league appearances and goals as of 9 November 2025 ‡ National team caps and goals as of 4 July 2024

Alexander Domínguez Carabalí (born 5 June 1987) is an Ecuadorian professional footballer who plays as a goalkeeper for Ecuadorian Serie A club LDU Quito.

== Club career ==
=== LDU Quito (2006-2016) ===
Domínguez played for L.D.U. Quito from 2006 to 2016, taking over the starting spot from José Francisco Cevallos. He won two Ecuadorian Serie A titles, the 2009 Copa Sudamericana, the 2009 Recopa Sudamericana and the 2010 Recopa Sudamericana.

Domínguez is one of the top 300 goalkeepers in the world, the third highest ranked Ecuadorian, and the highest ranked active Ecuadorian in terms of time spent without conceding a goal. From 2 September 2007 to 28 October 2007, he went 719 minutes without conceding a goal. He is nicknamed "Dida", after the Brazilian keeper of the same name.

=== Clúb de Fútbol Monterrey (2016-2017) ===
On 22 June 2016, it was confirmed that Domínguez would be joining Monterrey.

=== Cerro Largo (2021-2022) ===
Domínguez joined Uruguayan club Cerro Largo as a free agent on 20 August 2021. He played his first league match on 13 September 2021.

=== LDU Quito (2023- ) ===
On 16 July 2022, Domínguez was announced at LDU Quito on a two and a half year contract.

== International career ==
Domínguez is a former Ecuadorian youth international, who represented the country at the 2007 South American U-20 Championship. Domínguez received his first call-ups for the senior Ecuador national football team in May 2010 for friendlies against Mexico and South Korea. However, he remained an unused substitute. Because of club-related commitments, he would not receive another call-up until February 2011 for a friendly against Honduras. Again, he was an unused substitute. Manager Reinaldo Rueda finally gave Domínguez his first cap on 26 March 2011 in a 2–0 friendly defeat to Colombia. At the 2011 Copa América, he served as back-up to Marcelo Elizaga.

He established himself as Ecuador's first choice goalkeeper during the 2014 FIFA World Cup qualifying campaign, making 12 appearances for La Tri. In June 2014, Domínguez was named in Ecuador's squad for the 2014 FIFA World Cup. On 15 June, he made his FIFA World Cup debut in a 2–1 defeat to Switzerland at the Estádio Nacional Mané Garrincha in Brasília.

On 25 June 2014, Domínguez was named Man of the Match vs. France in Ecuador's final match at the 2014 FIFA World Cup. Domínguez kept a clean sheet and stopped shots from the likes of Karim Benzema, Paul Pogba, and Olivier Giroud. Domínguez was selected in the 23 player Ecuador squad for the Copa América Centenario. Domínguez was selected in the 23-man Ecuador squad for the 2019 Copa América. Domínguez was selected in the 28 player Ecuador squad for the 2021 Copa América.

In November 2022, Domínguez was named in Ecuador's squad for the 2022 FIFA World Cup held in Qatar. He played a fundamental role in the harmonization of the group of players, and was a substitute for all three group stages matches against, Qatar, the Netherlands and Senegal.

Domínguez was called up to the final 26-man Ecuador squad for the 2024 Copa América.

== Career statistics ==
=== Club ===
As of match played 12 November 2024

Appearances and goals by club, season and competition
Club	Season	League			Cup		Continental		Other		Total	
Club	Season	Division	Apps	Goals	Apps	Goals	Apps	Goals	Apps	Goals	Apps	Goals
L.D.U. Quito	2006	Ecuadorian Serie A	1	0	—		—		—		1	0
L.D.U. Quito	2007	Ecuadorian Serie A	19	0	—		—		—		19	0
L.D.U. Quito	2008	Ecuadorian Serie A	14	0	—		—		—		14	0
L.D.U. Quito	2009	Ecuadorian Serie A	24	0	—		12	0	2	0	38	0
L.D.U. Quito	2010	Ecuadorian Serie A	38	0	—		0	0	1	0	39	0
L.D.U. Quito	2011	Ecuadorian Serie A	34	0	—		19	0	—		53	0
L.D.U. Quito	2012	Ecuadorian Serie A	45	0	—		—		0	0	45	0
L.D.U. Quito	2013	Ecuadorian Serie A	39	0	—		2	0	—		41	0
L.D.U. Quito	2014	Ecuadorian Serie A	26	0	—		—		—		26	0
L.D.U. Quito	2015	Ecuadorian Serie A	39	0	—		6	0	—		45	0
L.D.U. Quito	2016	Ecuadorian Serie A	13	0	—		5	0	—		18	0
L.D.U. Quito	Total		292	0	—		44	0	3	0	339	0
Monterrey	2016–17	Liga MX	9	0	7	0	3	0	—		19	0
Colón	2017–18	Argentine Primera División	27	0	0	0	2	0	—		29	0
Vélez Sarsfield	2018–19	Argentine Primera División	12	0	1	0	—		0	0	13	0
Vélez Sarsfield	2019–20	Argentine Primera División	4	0	—		2	0	0	0	6	0
Vélez Sarsfield	2020–21	Argentine Primera División	2	0	—		3	0	—		5	0
Vélez Sarsfield	2021	Argentine Primera División	4	0	1	0	—		—		5	0
Vélez Sarsfield	Total		22	0	2	0	5	0	0	0	29	0
Cerro Largo	2021	Uruguayan Primera División	12	0	—		—		—		12	0
Deportes Tolima	2022	Categoría Primera A	9	0	2	0	7	0	—		18	0
L.D.U. Quito	2022	Ecuadorian Serie A	13	0	—		—		—		13	0
L.D.U. Quito	2023	Ecuadorian Serie A	27	0	—		14	0	—		41	0
L.D.U. Quito	2024	Ecuadorian Serie A	30	0	2	0	8	0	2	0	42	0
L.D.U. Quito	2025	Ecuadorian Serie A	21	0	3	0	2	0	1	0	27	0
L.D.U. Quito	Total		91	0	5	0	24	0	3	0	123	0
Career total			462	7	16	0	85	0	6	0	569	0

=== International ===
As of 4 July 2024

Ecuador
Year	Apps	Goals
2011	1	0
2012	8	0
2013	8	0
2014	6	0
2015	11	0
2016	8	0
2017	0	0
2018	5	0
2019	5	0
2020	4	0
2021	6	0
2022	6	0
2023	3	0
2024	6	0
Total	77	0

== Honours ==
L.D.U. Quito

- Copa Sudamericana (2): 2009, 2023
- Recopa Sudamericana (2): 2009, 2010
- Serie A (4): 2007, 2010, 2023, 2024
- Supercopa Ecuador (1): 2025

Deportes Tolima

- Superliga Colombiana (1) :2022
