= Michael Estrada =

Ecuadorian footballer

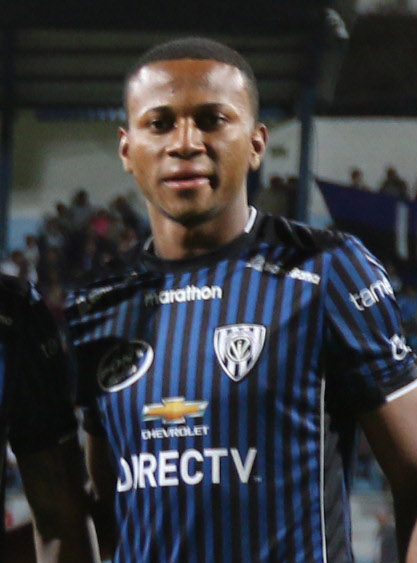

Personal information
- Full name: Michael Steveen Estrada Martínez
- Date of birth: 7 April 1996 (age 30)
- Place of birth: Guayaquil, Ecuador
- Height: 1.87 m (6 ft 2 in)
- Position: Forward

Team information
- Current team: L.D.U. Quito
- Number: 11

Youth career
- –2012: Patria
- 2013–2014: Macará

Senior career*
Years	Team	Apps	(Gls)
2013–2015	Macará	72	(22)
2016	El Nacional	40	(18)
2017–2018	Independiente del Valle	55	(18)
2019	Macará	29	(17)
2020–2024	Toluca	60	(13)
2022	→ D.C. United (loan)	16	(4)
2022–2023	→ Cruz Azul (loan)	24	(3)
2023–2024	→ CSKA Sofia (loan)	17	(4)
2024–	LDU Quito	75	(21)

International career^{‡}
2017–2023	Ecuador	41	(8)
- * Club domestic league appearances and goals as of 29 September 2025 ‡ National team caps and goals as of 29 November 2022

Michael Steveen Estrada Martínez (born 7 April 1996) is an Ecuadorian footballer who plays as a forward for L.D.U. Quito and the Ecuador national team.

== Career ==
=== Club ===
Estrada started his career with Macará, making his senior debut in the Ecuadorian Serie A on 10 March 2013 in a 1–0 loss against Barcelona. After three seasons with Macara's first team, Estrada joined El Nacional. He made his debut on 7 February 2016, scoring in a 2–1 win over Barcelona.

In December 2019, Estrada joined Liga MX side Toluca.

On 8 February 2022, Estrada moved to Major League Soccer side D.C. United on a season-long loan. Estrada debuted for United's 2022 season opener against Charlotte FC on 26 February, scoring 2 goals in the 3–0 win. In August, Estrada and the club mutually terminated the loan, and he returned to Toluca after scoring four goals in 16 league appearances.

Shortly thereafter, Estrada joined Cruz Azul on a year-long loan with an option to buy. He made his debut on 17 August in a 2–1 defeat to Tijuana.

On 16 February 2024, Estrada left CSKA, making 17 league appearances and scoring 4 goals.

Estrada was announced at LDU Quito on 17 February 2024.

=== International ===
Estrada was selected in the 28 player Ecuador squad for the 2021 Copa América.

On 14 November, Estrada was named in Ecuador's 26-man squad for the 2022 FIFA World Cup. He would start in the opening match of the group stage, a 2–0 win over Qatar.

== Career statistics ==
=== Club ===
As of 14 May 2024

Appearances and goals by club, season and competition
Club	Season	League			Cup (Note: Includes the Copa Ecuador, Copa MX, and U.S. Open Cup)		Continental		Other		Total	
Club	Season	Division	Apps	Goals	Apps	Goals	Apps	Goals	Apps	Goals	Apps	Goals
Macará	2013	Ecuadorian Serie A	6	0	—		—		—		6	0
Macará	2014	Ecuadorian Serie B	27	9	—		—		—		27	9
Macará	2015	Ecuadorian Serie B	39	13	—		—		—		39	13
Macará	Total		72	22	0	0	0	0	0	0	72	22
El Nacional	2016	Ecuadorian Serie A	40	18	—		—		—		40	18
Independiente del Valle	2017	Ecuadorian Serie A	31	15	—		4 (Note: Appearances in the Copa Libertadores)	2	—		35	17
Independiente del Valle	2018	Ecuadorian Serie A	24	3	—		2	0	—		26	3
Independiente del Valle	Total		55	18	0	0	6	2	0	0	61	20
Macará	2019	Ecuadorian Serie A	29	17	2	0	4 (Note: Appearances in the Copa Sudamericana)	3	—		35	20
Toluca	2019–20	Liga MX	7	2	6	4	—		—		13	6
Toluca	2020–21	Liga MX	37	11	—		—		—		37	11
Toluca	2021–22	Liga MX	16	0	—		—		—		16	0
Toluca	2022–23	Liga MX	0	0	—		—		—		0	0
Toluca	Total		60	13	6	4	0	0	0	0	66	17
D.C. United (loan)	2022	MLS	16	4	1	0	—		—		17	4
Cruz Azul (loan)	2022–23	Liga MX	24	3	—		—		0	0	24	3
CSKA Sofia (loan)	2023–24	First League	17	4	1	0	1	0	—		19	4
L.D.U. Quito	2024	Ecuadorian Serie A	11	2	—		5	1	2 (Note: Appearances in the Recopa Sudamericana)	0	18	3
Career total			324	101	10	4	16	6	2	0	352	111

=== International ===
As of 28 March 2023

Ecuador
Year	Apps	Goals
2017	3	0
2019	5	1
2020	4	3
2021	15	3
2022	12	1
2023	2	0
Total	41	8

List of international goals scored by Michael Estrada
No.	Date	Venue	Opponent	Score	Result	Competition
1	10 September 2019	Estadio Alejandro Serrano Aguilar, Cuenca, Ecuador	Bolivia	1–0	3–0	Friendly
2	13 October 2020	Estadio Rodrigo Paz Delgado, Quito, Ecuador	Uruguay	2–0	4–2	2022 FIFA World Cup qualification
3	13 October 2020	Estadio Rodrigo Paz Delgado, Quito, Ecuador	Uruguay	3–0	4–2	2022 FIFA World Cup qualification
4	17 November 2020	Estadio Rodrigo Paz Delgado, Quito, Ecuador	Colombia	3–0	6–1	2022 FIFA World Cup qualification
5	29 March 2021	Estadio Banco Guayaquil, Sangolquí, Ecuador	Bolivia	2–0	2–1	Friendly
6	2 September 2021	Estadio Rodrigo Paz Delgado, Quito, Ecuador	Paraguay	2–0	2–0	2022 FIFA World Cup qualification
7	7 October 2021	Estadio Monumental, Guayaquil, Ecuador	Bolivia	1–0	3–0	2022 FIFA World Cup qualification
8	1 February 2022	Estadio Nacional del Perú, Lima, Peru	Peru	1–0	1–1	2022 FIFA World Cup qualification

== Honours ==
Liga de Quito

- Ecuadorian Serie A: 2024
- Supercopa Ecuador: 2025

== See also ==
- All-time D.C. United roster
- List of Ecuadorians
- List of foreign Liga MX players
- List of foreign MLS players
