= Fernando Cornejo (footballer, born 1995) =

Chilean footballer

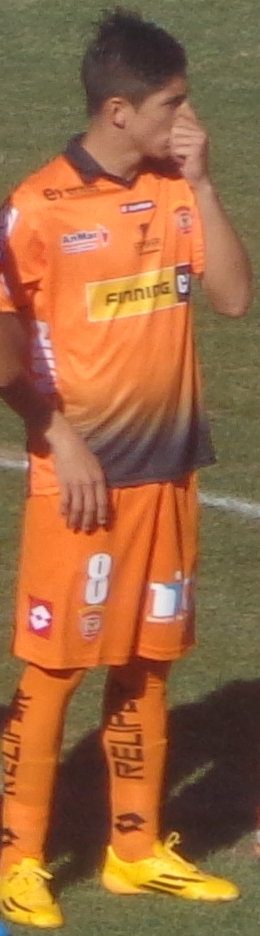
- Cornejo with Cobreloa in 2014

Personal information
- Full name: Fernando Nicolás Cornejo Miranda
- Date of birth: December 26, 1995 (age 30)
- Place of birth: Rancagua, Chile
- Height: 1.74 m (5 ft 8 1/2 in)
- Position: Midfielder

Team information
- Current team: LDU Quito
- Number: 20

Youth career
- Cobreloa

Senior career*
Years	Team	Apps	(Gls)
2013–2017	Cobreloa	70	(2)
2017–2022	Audax Italiano	73	(9)
2019	→ Coquimbo Unido (loan)	23	(2)
2020	→ Universidad de Chile (loan)	20	(0)
2023–2024	Palestino	42	(5)
2024–	LDU Quito	40	(6)

International career
2014	Chile U20		
- * Club domestic league appearances and goals as of 19 August 2025

Fernando Nicolás Cornejo Miranda (born 26 December 1995) is a Chilean footballer who plays as a midfielder for Ecuadorian club LDU Quito.

== Club career ==
He made his senior debut in Primera División for Cobreloa, on December 8, 2013, when he came on as a substitute in the second half against Universidad de Chile.

In November 2022, he joined Palestino for the 2023 season.

In the second half of 2024, Cornejo moved abroad and joined Ecuadorian club LDU Quito.

== International career ==
Cornejo represented Chile U20 at the Torneo Cuatro Naciones Chile 2014.

== Personal life ==
He is the son of former Chile international footballer Fernando Cornejo Jiménez and the older brother of Lucas Cornejo.
