= Leonel Quiñónez =

Ecuadorian footballer (born 1993)

Personal information
- Full name: Leonel Enríque Quiñónez Padilla
- Date of birth: 3 July 1993 (age 33)
- Place of birth: Esmeraldas, Ecuador
- Height: 1.75 m (5 ft 9 in)
- Position: Defender

Team information
- Current team: LDU Quito
- Number: 33

Senior career*
Years	Team	Apps	(Gls)
2012–2013	América de Quito	18	(0)
2013–2015	Deportivo Quevedo	78	(6)
2015–2020	Macará	183	(16)
2021–2022	Barcelona S.C.	44	(3)
2023–	LDU Quito	93	(2)

International career^{‡}
2021–	Ecuador	1	(0)
- * Club domestic league appearances and goals as of 28 April 2026 ‡ National team caps and goals as of 29 March 2021

Leonel Enríque Quiñónez Padilla, known as Leonel Quiñónez (born 3 July 1993) is an Ecuadorian footballer who plays as a defender for Ecuadorian club LDU Quito.

His goal on 19 August 2019 from approximately 70 meters out against CD Universidad Católica went viral and was among the 11 nominees for the 2020 FIFA Puskás Award. He became the first Ecuadorian footballer to be nominated for this award.

== International career ==
In 2020 he was called up to the Ecuador national team by manager Gustavo Alfaro, but did not make an appearance. He made his debut on 29 March 2021 in a friendly against Bolivia.

== Honours ==
Macará

- Serie B: 2016

LDU Quito

- Serie A: 2023, 2024
- Copa Sudamericana: 2023
