= Alexander Alvarado =

Ecuadorian footballer (born 1999)

Personal information
- Full name: Alexander Antonio Alvarado Carriel
- Date of birth: 21 April 1999 (age 27)
- Place of birth: Quevedo, Ecuador
- Height: 1.65 m (5 ft 5 in)
- Position: Winger

Team information
- Current team: LDU Quito
- Number: 10

Youth career
- 2008–2014: Deportivo Quevedo
- 2014–2015: Independiente del Valle

Senior career*
Years	Team	Apps	(Gls)
2015–2016	Deportivo Quito	4	(0)
2017	Gualaceo	43	(3)
2018–2020	Aucas	77	(5)
2020	→ Orlando City (loan)	2	(0)
2021–2022	Orlando City	10	(0)
2022	→ LDU Quito (loan)	27	(10)
2023–	LDU Quito	65	(12)
2024	→ Universidad Católica (loan)	12	(3)

International career^{‡}
2019	Ecuador U20	17	(4)
2019–	Ecuador	4	(0)
Medal record
Men's football
Representing Ecuador
FIFA U-20 World Cup
Third place	2019 Poland
- * Club domestic league appearances and goals as of 19 August 2025 ‡ National team caps and goals as of 24 March 2023

Alexander Antonio Alvarado Carriel (born 21 April 1999) is an Ecuadorian professional footballer who plays as a winger for Liga Pro Ecuador Serie A club LDU Quito.

== Club career ==
Alvarado joined the Deportivo Quevedo academy at the age of nine. At the age of 12, he was loaned to Canillitas Quevedo. In 2014, back with Deportivo's academy, he scored 28 goals to help the team win the youth championship and clinch the tournament's golden boot. At the end of the season, Alvarado was recruited to join the youth team at Independiente del Valle.

In 2015, Alvarado joined Deportivo Quito in Serie A where he made his senior debut but found his playing opportunities limited. He moved to Serie B side Gualaceo in 2017 in order to play regularly, making a total of 43 appearances and scoring 3 goals in his sole season with Gualaceo.

In 2018, Alvarado returned to Serie A after signing a three-year contract with Aucas.

On 13 October 2020, Alvarado joined Major League Soccer side Orlando City on loan for the rest of the 2020 season with an option to join permanently at the end of the year. He made his debut on 28 October as a 79th-minute substitute in a 4–1 win against Atlanta United. After two appearances, Alvarado had his loan move made permanent as part of the club's end of season roster moves on 2 December 2020.

On 19 January 2022, Alvarado joined Liga Pro Ecuador Serie A side LDU Quito on loan for the 2022 season with an option to buy. The purchase option was exercised on 29 November 2022.

== International career ==
=== Youth ===
In January 2019, Alvarado was selected to represent Ecuador U20 at the 2019 South American U-20 Championship. He scored three goals as Ecuador won the tournament, qualifying them for the 2019 U-20 World Cup in the process. Alvarado retained his place in the squad and appeared in all seven matches as the team finished in third-place. He scored once, a penalty in the round of 16 victory over Uruguay.

=== Senior ===
Alvarado made his senior international debut on 10 September 2019, entering as an 85th-minute substitute in a 3–0 friendly victory over Bolivia.

== Career statistics ==
=== Club ===
As of 14 May 2024

Appearances and goals by club, season and competition
Club	Season	League			Cup (Note: Includes Copa Ecuador.)		Continental (Note: Includes Copa Sudamericana.)		Playoffs		Total	
Club	Season	Division	Apps	Goals	Apps	Goals	Apps	Apps	Goals	Goals	Apps	Goals
Deportivo Quito	2015	Ecuadorian Serie A	1	0	—		—		—		1	0
Deportivo Quito	2016	Ecuadorian Serie A	3	0	—		—		—		3	0
Deportivo Quito	Total		4	0	0	0	0	0	0	0	4	0
Gualaceo	2017	Ecuadorian Serie B	43	3	—		—		—		43	3
Aucas	2018	Ecuadorian Serie A	39	3	0	0	—		2 (Note: 2018 Serie A Playoffs)	0	41	3
Aucas	2019	Ecuadorian Serie A	25	1	3	0	—		4 (Note: 2019 Serie A Playoffs)	0	32	1
Aucas	2020	Ecuadorian Serie A	13	1	0	0	2	1	—		15	2
Aucas	Total		77	5	3	0	2	1	6	0	88	6
Orlando City (loan)	2020	MLS	2	0	—		—		0	0	2	0
Orlando City	2021	MLS	10	0	—		—		0	0	10	0
L.D.U. Quito (loan)	2022	Ecuadorian Serie A	27	10	0	0	8	4	—		35	14
L.D.U. Quito	2023	Ecuadorian Serie A	31	10	0	0	13	2	—		44	12
L.D.U. Quito	2024	Ecuadorian Serie A	8	0	0	0	2	0	—		10	0
L.D.U. Quito	Total		39	10	0	0	15	2	0	0	54	12
Career total			202	28	3	0	25	7	6	0	236	35

=== International ===
As of 24 March 2023

Ecuador
Year	Apps	Goals
2019	2	0
2022	1	0
2023	1	0
Total	4	0

== Honors ==
Liga de Quito

- Serie A: 2023
- Copa Sudamericana: 2023

Ecuador U20

- South American U-20 Championship: 2019
- FIFA U-20 World Cup third place: 2019
