= Ricardo Adé =

Haitian footballer (born 1990)

Personal information
- Full name: Ricardo Adé Kat
- Date of birth: 21 May 1990 (age 36)
- Place of birth: Saint-Marc, Haiti
- Height: 1.90 m (6 ft 3 in)
- Position: Defender

Team information
- Current team: L.D.U. Quito
- Number: 4

Senior career*
Years	Team	Apps	(Gls)
2011–2013	Baltimore SC	56	(0)
2014	Miami United		
2015–2016	Don Bosco	16	(0)
2017–2018	Santiago Morning	51	(2)
2019–2020	Magallanes	45	(1)
2021	Mushuc Runa	24	(0)
2022	Aucas	27	(0)
2023–	L.D.U. Quito	112	(3)

International career^{‡}
2013–2026	Haiti	62	(2)
- * Club domestic league appearances and goals as of 23 November 2026 ‡ National team caps and goals as of 25 June 2026

Ricardo Adé Kat (born 21 May 1990) is a Haitian professional footballer who plays as a defender for Ecuadorian club L.D.U. Quito.

== Career ==
Adé intended to play in Thailand but he was victim of a fraud when the agent abandoned him while in Thailand. Since he couldn't play in Thailand, Adé moved to the United States and started playing for Miami United.

In 2017, Adé went to Santiago Morning. In his first season, he played 23 matches and scored 1 goal. An agent sent the videos of Adé playing for Miami United to the president of Primera B de Chile club Magallanes and the club hired Adé. After 4 years in Chile, Adé had the opportunity to play at First Division level in Ecuador, when he signed with Mushuc Runa S.C. in 2021. A year later, Adé was crowned as champions of 2022 Ecuadorian Serie A with S.D. Aucas. In 2023, Adé became a top player in Ecuador playing for L.D.U. Quito.

Adé made his international debut for Haiti in 2016. He became captain in 2021.

== Career statistics ==
=== International ===
As of match played 24 June 2026

Appearances and goals by national team and year
National team	Year	Apps	Goals
Haiti	2016	4	0
Haiti	2018	5	0
Haiti	2019	7	0
Haiti	2021	9	2
Haiti	2022	3	0
Haiti	2023	10	0
Haiti	2024	7	0
Haiti	2025	13	0
Haiti	2026	7	0
Total		62	2

Scores and results list Haiti's goal tally first.

List of international goals scored by Ricardo Adé
No.	Date	Venue	Opponent	Score	Result	Competition
1	25 March 2021	Stade Sylvio Cator, Port-au-Prince, Haiti	Belize	1–0	2–0	2022 FIFA World Cup qualification
2	18 July 2021	Toyota Stadium, Frisco, United States	Martinique	2–1	2–1	2021 CONCACAF Gold Cup

== Honours ==
Don Bosco FC

- Ligue Haïtienne (1): 2015

Aucas

- Ecuadorian Serie A (1): 2022

Liga de Quito

- Ecuadorian Serie A (2): 2023, 2024
- Copa Sudamericana (1): 2023
