= Bryan Ramírez =

Ecuadorian footballer (born 2000)

Personal information
- Full name: Bryan Josías Ramírez León
- Date of birth: 6 August 2000 (age 26)
- Place of birth: Esmeraldas, Ecuador
- Height: 1.77 m (5 ft 9 1/2 in)
- Positions: Winger; full-back

Team information
- Current team: FC Cincinnati
- Number: 29

Youth career
- 2012–2020: Norte América
- 2020–2021: Juvented
- 2021–2022: Cumbayá

Senior career*
| Years | Team | Apps | (Gls) |
| 2022 | Cumbayá | 34 | (0) |
| 2023–2026 | L.D.U. Quito | 88 | (9) |
| 2026– | FC Cincinnati | 30 | (2) |
- * Club domestic league appearances and goals as of 22:37, 15 November 2026 (UTC)

Bryan Josías Ramírez León (born 11 August 2000) is an Ecuadorian football player who plays for FC Cincinnati.

== Career ==
Ramírez started playing in the Ecuadorian Segunda Categoría for Juventud FC in Pichincha. His displays there caught the attention of Cumbayá.

=== Cumbayá ===
Ramírez played the 2022 season with Cumbaya, making his debut in Ecuadorian Serie A, playing 17 games in total. His form for Cumbayá led to him being labelled “one of the revelations” of the season.

=== L.D.U. Quito ===
Ramirez signed for L.D.U. Quito at the end of the 2022 season. He signed a five-year contract with the club. He featured in the final of the 2023 Copa Sudamericana which L.D.U. Quito won on penalties against Brazilian opponents Fortaleza.

=== FC Cincinnati ===
On 15 January 2026, Ramirez joined Major League Soccer side FC Cincinnati on a deal through to the end of the 2028–29 season.

== Style of play ==
Ramírez plays as a full-back, often on the left side of defence. He is also capable of playing further forward to offer in attack.

== Honours ==
LDU Quito

- Ecuadorian Serie A: 2023
- Copa Sudamericana: 2023
