= Braian =

Braian is a given name. Notable people called Braian include:

- Braian Aguirre (born 2000), Argentine professional footballer
- Braian Álvarez (born 1997), Argentine professional footballer
- Braian Angola (born 1994), Colombian professional basketball player
- Braian Brandán (born 1998), Argentine professional footballer
- Braian Cufré (born 1996), Argentine professional footballer
- Braian Galván (born 2000), Argentine professional footballer
- Braian Guille (born 1997), Argentine professional footballer
- Braian Lluy (born 1989), Argentine professional footballer
- Braian Maidana (born 1999), Argentine professional footballer
- Braian Mansilla (born 1997), Argentine professional footballer
- Braian Martínez (born 1999), Argentine professional footballer
- Braian Miranda (born 1993), Argentine professional footballer
- Braian Molina (born 1995), Argentine footballer
- Braian Ojeda (born 2000), Paraguayan professional footballer
- Braian Oyola (born 1996), Argentine professional footballer
- Braian Pedraza (born 1999), Argentine professional footballer
- Braian Rivero (born 1996), Argentine professional footballer
- Braian Rodríguez (born 1986), Uruguayan professional footballer
- Braian Romero (born 1991), Argentine professional footballer
- Braian Ruíz (born 1998), Argentine professional footballer
- Braian Samudio (born 1995), Paraguayan professional footballer
- Braian Toledo (1993–2020), Argentine javelin thrower
- Braian Volpini (born 1998), Argentine professional footballer

== See also ==
- Brian (disambiguation)
- Brien
- Bryan (given name)
- Bryan (surname)
- Brayan, a masculine given name
