= 2009–10 Primera B Nacional =

24th season of the second-tier football league in Argentina

Primera B Nacional
- Season: 2009–10
- Champions: Olimpo (3rd divisional title)
- Promoted: Olimpo; Quilmes; All Boys
- Relegated: Platense; Sportivo Italiano
- Top goalscorer: Leandro Armani (19 goals)

The 2009–10 Argentine Primera B Nacional was the 24th season of second division professional of football in Argentina. A total of 20 teams competed; the champion and runner-up were promoted to Argentine Primera División.

== Club information ==
Club	City	Stadium
Aldosivi	Mar del Plata	José María Minella
All Boys	Floresta	Islas Malvinas
Atlético de Rafaela	Rafaela	Nuevo Monumental
Belgrano	Córdoba	El Gigante de Alberdi
Boca Unidos	Corrientes	José Antonio Romero Feris
CAI	Comodoro Rivadavia	Municipal de Comodoro Rivadavia
Defensa y Justicia	Florencio Varela	Norberto "Tito" Tomaghello
Deportivo Merlo	Parque San Martín	José Manuel Moreno
Ferro Carril Oeste	Caballito	Arq. Ricardo Etcheverry
Gimnasia y Esgrima	San Salvador de Jujuy	23 de Agosto
Independiente Rivadavia	Mendoza	Bautista Gargantini
Instituto	Córdoba	Presidente Perón
Olimpo	Bahía Blanca	Roberto Natalio Carminatti
Platense	Florida	Ciudad de Vicente López
Quilmes	Quilmes	Centenario
San Martín	San Juan	Ing. Hilario Sánchez
San Martín	San Miguel de Tucumán	La Ciudadela
Sportivo Italiano	Ciudad Evita	Republica de Italia
Tiro Federal	Rosario	Fortín de Ludueña
Unión	Santa Fe	15 de Abril

== Standings ==
Pos	Team	Pld	W	D	L	GF	GA	GD	Pts	Promotion or qualification
1	Olimpo (C, P)	38	19	14	5	50	24	+26	71	Primera División
2	Quilmes (P)	38	17	13	8	39	31	+8	64	Primera División
3	Atlético de Rafaela	38	18	9	11	53	35	+18	63	Promotion Playoff Matches
4	All Boys	38	19	6	13	45	37	+8	63	Promotion Playoff Matches
5	Instituto	38	16	12	10	39	29	+10	60	
6	Belgrano	38	15	12	11	47	41	+6	57	
7	San Martín (SJ)	38	14	14	10	48	39	+9	56	
8	Gimnasia y Esgrima (J)	38	14	12	12	34	37	−3	54	
9	Unión	38	14	11	13	54	49	+5	53	
10	Defensa y Justicia	38	14	10	14	54	53	+1	52	
11	San Martín (T)	38	12	14	12	39	41	−2	50	
12	Ferro Carril Oeste	38	12	13	13	36	39	−3	49	
13	Boca Unidos	38	11	15	12	42	48	−6	48	
14	Platense	38	11	14	13	39	40	−1	47	
15	Independiente Rivadavia	38	12	11	15	47	58	−11	47	
16	Deportivo Merlo	38	12	10	16	35	44	−9	46	
17	Tiro Federal	38	12	8	18	52	53	−1	44	
18	CAI	38	11	10	17	47	52	−5	43	
19	Aldosivi	38	12	6	20	44	54	−10	42	
20	Sportivo Italiano	38	6	4	28	34	74	−40	22	

Updated to match(es) played on June 18, 2010. Source: AFA
Rules for classification: 1st points; 2nd goal difference; 3rd goals scored; 4th head-to-head points; 5th head-to-head goal difference; 6th head-to-head goals scored. This does not apply to determining the champion. If two or more teams had been tied in point at the end of the tournament, a playoff would have been held at a neutral venue within 72 hours for the championship
(C) Champions; (P) Promoted

== Promotion/relegation playoff Legs Primera División-Primera B Nacional ==
The 3rd and 4th placed of the table played with the 18th and the 17th placed of the Relegation Table of 2009–10 Primera División.

Team 1	Agg.	Team 2	1st leg	2nd leg
Promotion playoff 1
All Boys	4–1	Rosario Central	1–1	3–0
Promotion playoff 2
Atlético de Rafaela	2–3	Gimnasia y Esgrima (LP)	1–0	1–3

- All Boys was promoted to 2010–11 Primera División by winning the playoff and Rosario Central was relegated to 2010–11 Primera B Nacional.
- Gimnasia y Esgrima (LP) remained in the Primera División by winning the playoff.

== Relegation ==
Pos	Team	2007–08 Pts	2008–09 Pts	2009–10 Pts	Total Pts	Total Pld	Avg	Situation	Affiliation
1	Atlético de Rafaela	53	62	53	178	114	1.561		Indirect
2	Belgrano	56	62	57	175	114	1.535		Indirect
3	San Martín (T)	66	—	50	116	76	1.526		Indirect
4	Quilmes	55	51	64	170	114	1.491		Direct
5	All Boys	—	50	63	113	76	1.487		Direct
6	Olimpo	—	40	71	111	76	1.461		Direct
7	Gimnasia y Esgrima (J)	—	—	54	54	38	1.421		Indirect
8	Instituto	43	59	60	162	114	1.421		Indirect
9	San Martín (SJ)	—	49	58	107	76	1.408		Indirect
10	Unión	56	49	53	158	114	1.386		Direct
11	Ferro Carril Oeste	51	52	48	151	114	1.325		Direct
12	Tiro Federal	54	50	44	148	114	1.298		Indirect
13	Aldosivi	48	57	48	147	114	1.289		Indirect
14	Boca Unidos	—	—	48	48	38	1.263		Indirect
15	Defensa y Justicia	43	49	52	144	114	1.263		Direct
16	Independiente Rivadavia	47	50	47	144	114	1.263		Indirect
17	Deportivo Merlo	—	—	46	46	38	1.211	Relegation Playoff Matches	Direct
18	CAI	51	36	43	130	114	1.14	Relegation Playoff Matches	Indirect
19	Platense	41	37	49	127	114	1.114	Primera B Metropolitana	Direct
20	Sportivo Italiano	—	—	22	22	38	0.579	Primera B Metropolitana	Direct

Note: Clubs with indirect affiliation with AFA are relegated to the Torneo Argentino A, while clubs directly affiliated face relegation to Primera B Metropolitana. Clubs with direct affiliation are all from Greater Buenos Aires, with the exception of Newell's, Rosario Central, Central Córdoba and Argentino de Rosario, all from Rosario, and Unión and Colón from Santa Fe.

The bottom two teams of this table face relegation regardless of their affiliation status. Apart from them, the bottom teams of each affiliation face promotion/relegation playoffs against Torneo Argentino A and Primera B Metropolitana's "Reducido" (reduced tournaments) champions. The Reducidos are played after those leagues' champions are known.

Updated as of games played on June 18, 2010.

== Relegation Playoff Legs ==
Team 1	Agg.	Team 2	1st leg	2nd leg
Relegation/promotion playoff 1 (Direct affiliation vs. Primera B Metropolitana)
Sarmiento	0–2	Deportivo Merlo	0–1	0–1
Relegation/promotion playoff 2 (Indirect affiliation vs. Torneo Argentino A)
Santamarina	2–7	CAI	2–2	0–5

- Deportivo Merlo remained in the Primera B Nacional by winning the playoff.
- CAI remained in the Primera B Nacional by winning the playoff.

== See also ==
- 2009–10 in Argentine football
