= Alexis Niz =

Argentine footballer

Personal information
- Full name: Alexis Jorge Niz
- Date of birth: 15 May 1988 (age 38)
- Place of birth: Rafaela, Argentina
- Height: 1.79 m (5 ft 10 1/2 in)
- Position: Centre-back

Team information
- Current team: Chaco For Ever

Youth career
- Atlético de Rafaela

Senior career*
Years	Team	Apps	(Gls)
2006–2015	Atlético de Rafaela	54	(2)
2009	→ Sportivo Rivadavia (loan)	0	(0)
2015–2017	Sarmiento	29	(2)
2017–2019	Tigre	23	(0)
2019–2020	Atlético Rafaela	18	(0)
2020–2021	Instituto	3	(0)
2022–	Chaco For Ever	6	(0)
- * Club domestic league appearances and goals as of 18:32, 15 June 2022 (UTC)

Alexis Jorge Niz (born 15 May 1988) is an Argentine professional footballer who plays as a centre-back for Chaco For Ever.

== Career ==
Niz started off with Atlético de Rafaela in 2006, remaining for nine years whilst scoring two goals in fifty-nine games; his last appearance came against Nueva Chicago on 7 June 2015. During his time with Rafaela, he spent part of 2009 out on loan with Sportivo Rivadavia in Torneo Argentino C but failed to feature. On 6 July 2015, Niz joined Sarmiento of the Argentine Primera División. His Sarmiento debut arrived on 14 August versus Olimpo, which was his only appearance of the 2015 campaign for the club. He subsequently scored two goals in the following two seasons across twenty-nine appearances.

In June 2017, fellow Primera División side Tigre signed Niz following Sarmiento's relegation. He featured in fourteen fixtures in his debut campaign of 2017–18. Niz made the 100th appearance of his senior career in February 2018 versus Atlético Tucumán.

== Career statistics ==
As of 5 August 2018.

Club statistics
Club	Season	League			Cup (Note: Includes the Copa Argentina)		League Cup		Continental		Other		Total	
Club	Season	Division	Apps	Goals	Apps	Goals	Apps	Goals	Apps	Goals	Apps	Goals	Apps	Goals
Atlético de Rafaela	2006–07	Primera B Nacional	0	0	0	0	—		—		0	0	0	0
Atlético de Rafaela	2007–08	Primera B Nacional	0	0	0	0	—		—		0	0	0	0
Atlético de Rafaela	2008–09	Primera B Nacional	0	0	0	0	—		—		0	0	0	0
Atlético de Rafaela	2009–10	Primera B Nacional	0	0	0	0	—		—		0	0	0	0
Atlético de Rafaela	2010–11	Primera B Nacional	4	0	0	0	—		—		0	0	4	0
Atlético de Rafaela	2011–12	Primera División	8	0	2	0	—		—		0	0	10	0
Atlético de Rafaela	2012–13	Primera División	5	0	1	0	—		—		0	0	6	0
Atlético de Rafaela	2013–14	Primera División	19	1	0	0	—		—		0	0	19	1
Atlético de Rafaela	2014	Primera División	4	0	1	0	—		—		0	0	5	0
Atlético de Rafaela	2015	Primera División	14	1	1	0	—		—		0	0	15	1
Atlético de Rafaela	Total		54	2	5	0	—		—		0	0	59	2
Sportivo Rivadavia (loan)	2008–09	Torneo Argentino C	0	0	0	0	—		—		0	0	0	0
Sarmiento	2015	Primera División	1	0	0	0	—		—		0	0	1	0
Sarmiento	2016	Primera División	10	1	0	0	—		—		0	0	10	1
Sarmiento	2016–17	Primera División	18	1	1	0	—		—		0	0	19	1
Sarmiento	Total		29	2	1	0	—		—		0	0	30	2
Tigre	2017–18	Primera División	14	0	0	0	—		—		0	0	14	0
Tigre	2018–19	Primera División	0	0	0	0	—		—		0	0	0	0
Tigre	Total		14	0	0	0	—		—		0	0	14	0
Career total			97	4	6	0	—		—		0	0	103	4

== Honours ==
Atlético de Rafaela

- Primera B Nacional: 2010–11
