= Rodrigo Depetris =

Argentine footballer (born 1990)

Personal information
- Full name: Rodrigo Leonel Depetris
- Date of birth: 5 May 1990 (age 36)
- Place of birth: San Jorge, Argentina
- Height: 1.76 m (5 ft 9 1/2 in)
- Position: Forward

Team information
- Current team: Nuova Florida

Senior career*
Years	Team	Apps	(Gls)
2009–2015	Atlético de Rafaela	86	(7)
2015–2016	Olympiacos Volos	13	(5)
2016–2017	Sarmiento	24	(0)
2017	Tigre	6	(0)
2018	Atlético de Rafaela	2	(0)
2018–2019	Alvarado	30	(8)
2019–2020	Guillermo Brown	12	(3)
2020–2021	San Telmo	23	(1)
2022–	Nuova Florida	5	(0)
- * Club domestic league appearances and goals as of 19:38, 24 July 2022 (UTC)

Rodrigo Leonel Depetris (born 5 May 1990) is an Argentine professional footballer who plays as a forward for Nuova Florida Calcio.

== Career ==
Depetris spent the opening six years of his senior career with Atlético de Rafaela. After making three appearances for the club in two Primera B Nacional seasons, Depetris made his Argentine Primera División debut on 1 October 2011 versus Lanús. In February 2013, Depetris netted his career first goal during a Copa Argentina tie with Alvarado. He subsequently scored nine times in the next three seasons. On 9 September 2015, Olympiacos Volos of the Greek Football League signed Depetris. He scored five goals, the first against Acharnaikos on 19 October, in fourteen fixtures for Olympiacos Volos during 2015–16.

He returned to Argentina in 2016 to play for Argentine Primera División side Sarmiento. Just over a year later, fellow Primera División side Tigre became Depetris' fourth career club. He made six appearances for Tigre to end 2017, prior to securing a contract to rejoin Atlético de Rafaela in January 2018. Nine months later, in September, Depetris joined Alvarado of Torneo Federal A.

== Personal life ==
Rodrigo's brother, David, is also a footballer.

== Career statistics ==
As of 6 September 2018.

Club statistics
Club	Season	League			Cup (Note: Includes the Copa Argentina)		League Cup		Continental		Other		Total	
Club	Season	Division	Apps	Goals	Apps	Goals	Apps	Goals	Apps	Goals	Apps	Goals	Apps	Goals
Atlético de Rafaela	2009–10	Primera B Nacional	2	0	0	0	—		—		0	0	2	0
Atlético de Rafaela	2010–11	Primera B Nacional	1	0	0	0	—		—		0	0	1	0
Atlético de Rafaela	2011–12	Primera División	4	0	3	0	—		—		0	0	7	0
Atlético de Rafaela	2012–13	Primera División	23	0	2	1	—		—		0	0	25	1
Atlético de Rafaela	2013–14	Primera División	32	5	0	0	—		—		1 (Note: One appearance in 2013–14 Primera División play-offs)	1 (Note: One goal in 2013–14 Primera División play-offs)	33	6
Atlético de Rafaela	2014	Primera División	13	1	3	0	—		—		0	0	16	1
Atlético de Rafaela	2015	Primera División	11	1	1	1	—		—		0	0	12	2
Atlético de Rafaela	Total		86	7	9	2	—		—		1	1	96	10
Olympiacos Volos	2015–16	Football League	13	5	1	0	—		—		0	0	14	5
Sarmiento	2016	Primera División	11	0	1	0	—		—		0	0	12	0
Sarmiento	2016–17	Primera División	13	0	0	0	—		—		0	0	13	0
Sarmiento	Total		24	0	0	0	—		—		0	0	24	0
Tigre	2017–18	Primera División	6	0	0	0	—		—		0	0	6	0
Atlético de Rafaela	2017–18	Primera B Nacional	2	0	0	0	—		—		1 (Note: One appearance in 2017–18 Primera B Nacional play-offs)	0	3	0
Alvarado	2018–19	Torneo Federal A	0	0	0	0	—		—		0	0	0	0
Career total			131	12	11	2	—		—		2	1	144	15
