= Zelmar García =

Argentine footballer (born 1987)

Personal information
- Date of birth: 2 March 1987 (age 39)
- Place of birth: Tapalqué, Argentina
- Height: 1.75 m (5 ft 9 in)
- Position: Left-back

Youth career
- Vélez Sarsfield

Senior career*
Years	Team	Apps	(Gls)
2008–2009	Deportivo Merlo	21	(1)
2009–2012	Godoy Cruz	57	(1)
2012–2013	Quilmes	0	(0)
2014	Brown	11	(0)
2015–2017	Chacarita Juniors	13	(0)
2015–2017	→ Deportivo Merlo (loan)	66	(5)
2017–2019	Colegiales	38	(1)
2019–2020	Argentino de Quilmes	9	(1)
2020–2021	FADEP		
- * Club domestic league appearances and goals as of 19:46, 23 September 2019 (UTC)

Zelmar García (born 2 March 1987) is an Argentine professional footballer who plays as a left-back.

== Career ==
García played in Vélez Sarsfield's youth. Deportivo Merlo were García's first senior club. He scored one goal in twenty-one fixtures in 2008–09 in Primera B Metropolitana, as the club won promotion via the play-offs. In 2009, Godoy Cruz of the Primera División signed García. His first appearance came in a win over Atlético Tucumán on 12 March 2010, which was the first of nine appearances in 2009–10. He remained for two more seasons, as he also scored his first goal in April 2011 during a win at the Estadio Monumental Antonio Vespucio Liberti against River Plate. García had a 2012–13 stint with Quilmes but didn't play.

In January 2014, García completed a move to Primera B Nacional's Brown. His first season concluded with relegation to tier three, as he appeared seven times under Pablo Vicó. García remained for the 2014 Primera B Metropolitana, prior to departing to Chacarita Juniors on 9 January 2015. Thirteen appearances followed across seven months, before he rejoined Deportivo Merlo on loan in July. The club were soon relegated, though García stayed for two seasons in Primera C Metropolitana. 2017 saw García join Colegiales. He made his bow against Tristán Suárez, with goal one following versus Barracas Central.

== Career statistics ==
As of 6 May 2019.

Appearances and goals by club, season and competition
Club	Season	League			Cup		League Cup		Continental		Other		Total	
Club	Season	Division	Apps	Goals	Apps	Goals	Apps	Goals	Apps	Goals	Apps	Goals	Apps	Goals
Deportivo Merlo	2008–09	Primera B Metropolitana	21	1	0	0	—		—		2 (Note: Appearance(s) in the Primera B Metropolitana play-offs)	0	23	1
Godoy Cruz	2009–10	Primera División	9	0	0	0	—		—		0	0	9	0
Godoy Cruz	2010–11	Primera División	25	1	0	0	—		6 (Note: Appearance(s) in the Copa Libertadores)	0	0	0	31	1
Godoy Cruz	2011–12	Primera División	23	0	1	0	—		4 (Note: Appearance(s) in the Copa Libertadores and Copa Sudamericana)	0	0	0	28	0
Godoy Cruz	Total		57	1	1	0	—		10	0	0	0	68	1
Quilmes	2012–13	Primera División	0	0	0	0	—		—		0	0	0	0
Brown	2013–14	Primera B Nacional	6	0	1	0	—		—		0	0	7	0
Brown	2014	Primera B Metropolitana	5	0	0	0	—		—		0	0	5	0
Brown	Total		11	0	1	0	—		—		0	0	12	0
Chacarita Juniors	2015	Primera B Nacional	13	0	1	0	—		—		0	0	14	0
Chacarita Juniors	2016	Primera B Nacional	0	0	0	0	—		—		0	0	0	0
Chacarita Juniors	2016–17	Primera B Nacional	0	0	0	0	—		—		0	0	0	0
Chacarita Juniors	Total		13	0	1	0	—		—		0	0	14	0
Deportivo Merlo (loan)	2015	Primera B Metropolitana	13	0	1	0	—		—		0	0	14	0
Colegiales	2017–18	Primera B Metropolitana	17	1	0	0	—		—		0	0	17	1
Colegiales	2018–19	Primera B Metropolitana	18	0	0	0	—		—		0	0	18	0
Colegiales	Total		35	1	0	0	—		—		0	0	35	1
Career total			150	3	4	0	—		10	0	2	0	166	3
