= Maximiliano Díaz (footballer) =

Argentine footballer

Personal information
- Full name: Maximiliano Andrés Díaz
- Date of birth: 28 May 1990 (age 36)
- Place of birth: Merlo, Argentina
- Height: 1.94 m (6 ft 4 1/2 in)
- Position: Goalkeeper

Team information
- Current team: El Porvenir

Senior career*
Years	Team	Apps	(Gls)
2010–2012	Deportivo Merlo	0	(0)
2012–2013	Ferrocarril Midland		
2013–2014	Central Córdoba	3	(0)
2014	JJ Urquiza		
2015–2017	El Porvenir	77	(0)
2017–2018	Tigre	1	(0)
2018	Fénix	3	(0)
2019	Ben Hur	3	(0)
2020–	El Porvenir		
- * Club domestic league appearances and goals

Maximiliano Andrés Díaz (born 28 May 1990) is an Argentine professional footballer who plays as a goalkeeper for El Porvenir.

== Career ==
Díaz got his senior career underway in 2010 with Deportivo Merlo, he left two years later without featuring but was an unused substitute on two occasions. After leaving in 2012, Díaz had subsequent spells with Ferrocarril Midland, Central Córdoba and Justo José de Urquiza in the following two years. In January 2015, Díaz completed a move to El Porvenir of Primera D Metropolitana. In his second season, 2016, the club won promotion to Primera C Metropolitana. After forty-one matches in the former, he made thirty-six appearances in the latter division. On 26 July 2017, Díaz joined Argentine Primera División side Tigre.

His professional career debut arrived on 8 December 2017 against Temperley; Díaz's only appearance of the 2017–18 campaign. He was released at the end of that season. A move to Fénix of Primera B Metropolitana was announced in July 2018. He featured in games against UAI Urquiza, Estudiantes and Barracas Central before departing at the end of the year to join Ben Hur in January 2019. Three appearances followed in Torneo Regional Federal Amateur.

== Career statistics ==
As of 27 October 2020.

Club statistics
Club	Season	League			Cup		League Cup		Continental		Other		Total	
Club	Season	Division	Apps	Goals	Apps	Goals	Apps	Goals	Apps	Goals	Apps	Goals	Apps	Goals
Deportivo Merlo	2010–11	Primera B Nacional	0	0	0	0	—		—		0	0	0	0
Deportivo Merlo	2011–12	Primera B Nacional	0	0	0	0	—		—		0	0	0	0
Deportivo Merlo	Total		0	0	0	0	—		—		0	0	0	0
Central Córdoba	2013–14	Primera C Metropolitana	3	0	0	0	—		—		0	0	3	0
Tigre	2017–18	Primera División	1	0	0	0	—		—		0	0	1	0
Fénix	2018–19	Primera B Nacional	3	0	0	0	—		—		0	0	3	0
Ben Hur	2019	Torneo Amateur	3	0	0	0	—		—		0	0	3	0
Career total			10	0	0	0	—		—		0	0	10	0

== Honours ==
El Porvenir

- Primera D Metropolitana: 2016
