= Imperiale (surname) =

Imperiale is a surname. Notable people with the surname include:

- Andrés Imperiale (born 1986), Argentine footballer
- Anthony Imperiale (1931–1999), American politician
- Daniel Imperiale (born 1988), Argentine footballer
- Marco Imperiale (born 1999), Italian footballer
