= Maximiliano Díaz =

Maximiliano Díaz may refer to:

- Maximiliano Díaz (athlete), Argentine athlete
- Maximiliano Díaz (footballer), Argentine footballer
