= 2010–11 Primera B Nacional =

25th season of the second-tier football league in Argentina

Primera B Nacional
- Season: 2010–11
- Champions: Atlético de Rafaela (2nd Divisional title)
- Promoted: Atlético de Rafaela; Unión; Belgrano; San Martín (SJ)
- Relegated: CAI; San Martín (T); Tiro Federal
- Matches played: 380
- Goals scored: 822 (2.16 per match)
- Top goalscorer: César Carignano 21 goals

The 2010–11 Argentine Primera B Nacional was the 25th season of second division professional of football in Argentina. A total of 20 teams competed; the champion and runner-up were promoted to Argentine Primera División.

== Club information ==
Locations of the 2010–11 season teams outside Greater Buenos Aires (green).
Locations of the 2010−11 season teams within Greater Buenos Aires. Buenos Aires locations (red), outside Buenos Aires within Greater Buenos Aires (blue).

Club	City	Stadium
Aldosivi	Mar del Plata	José María Minella
Almirante Brown	Isidro Casanova	Fragata Presidente Sarmiento
Atlético de Rafaela	Rafaela	Rafaela
Atlético Tucumán	San Miguel de Tucumán	Monumental Presidente Jose Fierro
Belgrano	Córdoba	El Gigante de Alberdi
Boca Unidos	Corrientes	José Antonio Romero Feris
CAI	Comodoro Rivadavia	Municipal de Comodoro Rivadavia
Chacarita Juniors	Villa Maipú	Chacarita Juniors
Defensa y Justicia	Florencio Varela	Norberto "Tito" Tomaghello
Deportivo Merlo	Parque San Martín	José Manuel Moreno
Ferro Carril Oeste	Buenos Aires	Arq. Ricardo Etcheverry
Gimnasia y Esgrima	San Salvador de Jujuy	23 de Agosto
Independiente Rivadavia	Mendoza	Bautista Gargantini
Instituto	Córdoba	Presidente Perón
Patronato	Paraná	Presbítero Bartolomé Grella
Rosario Central	Rosario	Gigante de Arroyito
San Martín	San Juan	Ing. Hilario Sánchez
San Martín	San Miguel de Tucumán	La Ciudadela
Tiro Federal	Rosario	Fortín de Ludueña
Unión	Santa Fe	15 de Abril

== Standings ==
Pos	Team	Pld	W	D	L	GF	GA	GD	Pts	Promotion or qualification
1	Atlético de Rafaela (C, P)	38	23	8	7	65	26	+39	77	Primera División
2	Unión (P)	38	22	3	13	49	38	+11	69	Primera División
3	San Martín (SJ)	38	18	10	10	46	32	+14	64	Promotion Playoff Matches
4	Belgrano	38	15	14	9	53	37	+16	59	Promotion Playoff Matches
5	Gimnasia y Esgrima (J)	38	13	15	10	40	41	−1	54	
6	Almirante Brown	38	13	13	12	32	28	+4	52	
7	Aldosivi	38	14	10	14	45	47	−2	52	
8	Boca Unidos	38	13	13	12	43	46	−3	52	
9	Atlético Tucumán	38	14	9	15	44	41	+3	51	
10	Instituto	38	11	18	9	38	35	+3	51	
11	Deportivo Merlo	38	13	12	13	32	37	−5	51	
12	Rosario Central	38	14	8	16	44	44	0	50	
13	Patronato	38	14	8	16	41	43	−2	50	
14	Ferro Carril Oeste	38	11	14	13	38	47	−9	47	
15	San Martín (T)	38	11	12	15	33	41	−8	45	
16	Chacarita Juniors	38	10	14	14	24	36	−12	44	
17	Defensa y Justicia	38	10	13	15	37	42	−5	43	
18	Independiente Rivadavia	38	9	13	16	44	49	−5	40	
19	Tiro Federal	38	8	13	17	37	56	−19	37	
20	CAI	38	6	16	16	38	57	−19	34	

Updated to match(es) played on June 18, 2011. Source: AFA
Rules for classification: 1st points; 2nd goal difference; 3rd goals scored; 4th head-to-head points; 5th head-to-head goal difference; 6th head-to-head goals scored. This does not apply to determining the champion. If two or more teams had been tied in point at the end of the tournament, a playoff would have been held at a neutral venue within 72 hours for the championship
(C) Champions; (P) Promoted

== Promotion/relegation playoff Legs Primera División-Primera B Nacional ==
The 3rd and 4th placed of the table played with the 18th and the 17th placed of the Relegation Table of 2010–11 Primera División.

Team 1	Agg.	Team 2	1st leg	2nd leg
Promotion playoff 1
Belgrano	3–1	River Plate	2–0	1–1
Promotion playoff 2
San Martín (SJ)	2–1	Gimnasia y Esgrima (LP)	1–0	1–1

- Belgrano was promoted to 2011–12 Primera División by winning the playoff and River Plate was relegated to 2011–12 Primera B Nacional.
- San Martín (SJ) was promoted to 2011–12 Primera División by winning the playoff and Gimnasia y Esgrima (LP) was relegated to 2011–12 Primera B Nacional.

== Results ==
Home \ Away	ALD	ALM	ATR	ATU	BEL	BU	CAI	CHA	D&J	MER	FCO	GJU	IRV	INS	PAT	RCE	SMJ	SMT	TIR	USF
Aldosivi		1–0	3–2	0–3	2–1	2–0	0–1	2–0	2–0	1–0	5–1	0–0	1–1	0–0	4–1	0–5	2–0	0–1	1–1	0–1
Almirante Brown	1–0		0–1	0–0	1–2	3–1	1–0	0–1	2–0	0–1	1–1	0–0	2–2	1–1	1–2	1–0	0–0	1–0	2–0	2–0
Atlético de Rafaela	2–0	1–1		0–0	2–1	3–0	5–1	2–0	2–1	2–0	3–0	6–0	2–2	4–0	1–0	0–1	4–1	2–1	1–1	1–2
Atlético Tucumán	2–1	3–0	0–2		2–0	1–1	4–1	0–1	1–0	2–1	0–0	0–3	2–1	1–2	2–0	4–2	1–2	1–0	0–0	0–1
Belgrano	1–0	1–2	0–0	2–0		2–1	0–0	1–1	2–0	1–0	1–1	1–1	3–0	2–2	2–1	1–1	1–1	4–0	2–3	3–2
Boca Unidos	0–0	1–1	0–1	2–0	3–3		1–1	0–0	2–2	1–0	3–2	0–0	1–0	1–3	1–0	2–0	1–1	2–0	1–0	2–1
CAI	2–2	0–0	0–0	1–1	1–1	1–3		1–3	2–2	1–1	0–3	1–0	3–3	0–1	0–2	3–1	0–1	1–0	1–2	1–2
Chacarita Juniors	1–1	0–1	1–2	1–0	1–0	1–1	0–1		1–0	0–0	0–3	0–0	0–0	2–0	1–3	0–2	0–1	1–1	0–0	1–0
Defensa y Justicia	0–0	0–0	0–1	1–1	2–3	1–0	2–1	3–1		0–2	1–1	1–3	2–2	2–0	1–1	2–1	2–0	0–0	5–1	0–1
Deportivo Merlo	0–2	0–2	1–0	3–2	0–2	2–2	1–1	0–0	1–0		2–1	2–0	3–2	0–1	1–1	1–0	0–3	1–1	0–0	1–1
Ferro Carril Oeste	3–1	0–0	2–0	2–1	1–1	0–2	2–2	3–0	0–0	0–2		1–0	1–0	1–1	0–2	1–0	1–0	1–0	1–3	0–2
Gimnasia y Esgrima (J)	2–2	2–1	2–2	2–1	1–1	1–0	4–2	0–0	0–0	0–0	0–0		1–0	3–3	1–0	3–3	2–1	1–1	2–1	0–2
Independiente Rivadavia	2–3	1–0	3–1	1–1	0–2	3–1	0–0	0–2	3–1	0–1	1–1	0–1		1–1	3–0	0–1	0–1	1–1	2–0	1–2
Instituto	4–0	1–1	0–0	0–1	0–0	0–0	1–1	0–0	2–0	1–2	1–1	2–0	1–0		0–0	3–3	1–0	2–0	1–1	0–1
Patronato	3–0	0–1	0–1	2–1	2–0	3–1	1–0	3–1	0–2	0–1	0–0	1–0	2–2	0–0		2–2	0–2	0–0	4–1	0–2
Rosario Central	0–2	0–1	0–1	2–0	2–1	1–2	1–0	2–1	0–0	2–1	3–0	0–1	1–1	1–0	1–0		1–1	0–1	1–0	0–1
San Martín (SJ)	1–1	2–1	1–0	0–1	0–0	2–1	2–2	0–1	1–0	0–0	3–1	2–1	1–0	2–0	4–0	3–0		0–0	0–2	3–1
San Martín (T)	2–0	1–0	0–3	1–1	1–0	1–1	1–2	0–0	0–2	2–0	1–1	2–1	1–2	2–3	1–2	2–1	2–1		2–0	1–1
Tiro Federal	3–1	1–1	2–4	2–4	0–2	1–2	1–1	1–1	0–0	1–1	4–1	1–0	1–2	0–0	1–0	1–2	1–1	0–2		0–2
Unión	0–3	1–0	0–1	1–0	0–3	3–0	2–1	2–0	2–3	2–0	1–0	1–2	1–2	1–0	0–2	1–1	1–2	2–1	3–0	

Updated to match(es) played on June 14, 2011. Source: universofutbol.com
Legend: Blue = home team win; Yellow = draw; Red = away team win.

== Relegation ==
Pos	Team	2008–09 Pts	2009–10 Pts	2010–11 Pts	Total Pts	Total Pld	Avg	Situation	Affiliation
1	Atlético de Rafaela	62	63	77	202	114	1.772		Indirect
2	Atlético Tucumán	74	—	51	125	76	1.645		Indirect
3	Belgrano	62	57	59	178	114	1.561		Indirect
4	Chacarita Juniors	72	—	44	116	76	1.526		Direct
5	Unión	49	53	69	171	114	1.5		Direct
6	Instituto	59	60	51	170	114	1.491		Indirect
7	San Martín (SJ)	49	56	64	169	114	1.482		Indirect
8	Gimnasia y Esgrima (J)	—	54	54	108	76	1.421		Indirect
9	Almirante Brown	—	—	52	52	38	1.368		Direct
10	Aldosivi	57	42	52	151	114	1.325		Indirect
11	Patronato	—	—	50	50	38	1.316		Indirect
12	Rosario Central	—	—	50	50	38	1.316		Direct
13	Boca Unidos	—	48	52	100	76	1.316		Indirect
14	Ferro Carril Oeste	52	49	47	148	114	1.298		Direct
15	Deportivo Merlo	—	46	51	97	76	1.276		Direct
16	Defensa y Justicia	49	52	43	144	114	1.263		Direct
17	San Martín (T)	—	50	45	95	76	1.25	Relegation Playoff Matches	Indirect
18	Independiente Rivadavia	50	47	40	137	114	1.202	Relegation Playoff Matches	Indirect
19	Tiro Federal	50	44	37	131	114	1.149	Torneo Argentino A	Indirect
20	CAI	36	43	34	113	114	0.991	Torneo Argentino A	Indirect

Note: Clubs with indirect affiliation with AFA are relegated to the Torneo Argentino A, while clubs directly affiliated face relegation to Primera B Metropolitana. Clubs with direct affiliation are all from Greater Buenos Aires, with the exception of Newell's, Rosario Central, Central Córdoba and Argentino de Rosario, all from Rosario, and Unión and Colón from Santa Fe.

The bottom two teams of this table face relegation regardless of their affiliation status. Apart from them, the bottom teams of each affiliation face promotion/relegation playoffs against Torneo Argentino A and Primera B Metropolitana's "Reducido" (reduced tournaments) champions. The Reducidos are played after those leagues' champions are known.

Updated as of games played on December 9, 2010.

== Relegation Playoff Legs ==
Team 1	Agg.	Team 2	1st leg	2nd leg
Relegation/promotion playoff 1 (Indirect affiliation vs. Primera B Metropolitana)
Defensores de Belgrano	2–2	Independiente Rivadavia	0–0	2–2
Relegation/promotion playoff 2 (Indirect affiliation vs. Torneo Argentino A)
Desamparados	2–1	San Martín (T)	1–0	1–1

- Independiente Rivadavia remained in the Primera B Nacional after a 2-2 aggregate tie by virtue of a "sports advantage". In case of a tie in goals, the team from the Primera B Nacional gets to stay in it.
- Desamparados qualified to the 2011–12 Primera B Nacional and San Martín (T) got relegated to the 2011–12 Torneo Argentino A.

== Season statistics ==
=== Top scorers ===
Rank	Player	Club	Goals
1	(Argentina) César Carignano	Atlético de Rafaela	21
2	(Argentina) Sebastián Penco	San Martín (SJ)	16
2	(Argentina) Aldo Visconti	Boca Unidos	16
4	(Argentina) Matías Gigli	Aldosivi	14
4	(Argentina) Diego Jara	Patronato	14
4	(Argentina) César Pereyra	Belgrano	14
4	(Argentina) Matías Quiroga	Unión	14
8	(Argentina) Leandro Armani	Tiro Federal	13
8	(Argentina) Darío Benedetto	Gimnasia y Esgrima (J)	13
8	(Argentina) Federico González	Atlético de Rafaela	13
10	(Argentina) Cristian Chávez	Atlético Tucumán	12

== See also ==
- 2010–11 in Argentine football
