= Brian Ruiz =

Brian Ruiz may refer to:

- Braian Ruíz (born 1998), Argentine footballer
- Bryan Ruiz (born 1985), Costa Rican footballer
