= Ezequiel Rodríguez (footballer, born 1990) =

Argentine footballer

Personal information
- Full name: Ezequiel Alejandro Rodríguez
- Date of birth: 26 October 1990 (age 36)
- Place of birth: San Miguel de Tucumán, Argentina
- Height: 1.87 m (6 ft 1 1/2 in)
- Position: Midfielder

Team information
- Current team: Temperley

Senior career*
Years	Team	Apps	(Gls)
2009–2010	All Boys		
2011	Jorge Newbery		
2011–2015	Sportivo Rivadavia		
2014–2015	→ Tristán Suárez (loan)	43	(4)
2016–2017	Atlanta	41	(3)
2017–2021	Tigre	14	(0)
2021–	Temperley	30	(0)
- * Club domestic league appearances and goals as of 17:50, 3 August 2022 (UTC)

Ezequiel Alejandro Rodríguez (born 26 October 1990) is an Argentine professional footballer who plays as a forward for Primera Nacional side Temperley.

== Career ==
After periods with All Boys and Jorge Newbery, Rodríguez made the move to Sportivo Rivadavia in 2011. Three years later, Rodríguez joined Tristán Suárez of Primera B Metropolitana on loan for two seasons. He made his first appearance in professional football on 9 August 2014, playing the final six minutes of a 1–2 win over Colegiales. In May 2015, he scored the first two goals of his pro career in a win away to Sportivo Italiano. Rodríguez returned to Sportivo Rivadavia in late-2015 following four goals in forty-seven games for Tristán Suárez. Primera B Metropolitana's Atlanta completed the signing of Rodríguez in January 2016.

He remained with Atlanta for the 2016 and 2016–17 campaigns, making forty-one appearances and netting three goals. July 2017 saw Rodríguez join Argentine Primera División side Tigre. He was sent off on his top-flight debut against Belgrano on 22 September.

== Career statistics ==
As of 9 May 2018.

Club statistics
Club	Season	League			Cup (Note: Includes the Copa Argentina)		League Cup		Continental		Other		Total	
Club	Season	Division	Apps	Goals	Apps	Goals	Apps	Goals	Apps	Goals	Apps	Goals	Apps	Goals
Tristán Suárez (loan)	2014	Primera B Metropolitana	12	0	0	0	—		—		2	0	14	0
Tristán Suárez (loan)	2015	Primera B Metropolitana	31	4	2	0	—		—		0	0	33	4
Tristán Suárez (loan)	Total		43	4	2	0	—		—		2	0	47	4
Atlanta	2016	Primera B Metropolitana	16	1	0	0	—		—		0	0	16	1
Atlanta	2016–17	Primera B Metropolitana	25	2	0	0	—		—		0	0	25	2
Atlanta	Total		41	3	0	0	—		—		0	0	41	3
Tigre	2017–18	Primera División	3	0	0	0	—		—		0	0	3	0
Career total			87	7	2	0	—		—		2	0	91	7
