= Iván Bolaño =

Argentine footballer

Personal information
- Full name: Jorge Iván Bolaño
- Date of birth: 15 May 1998 (age 28)
- Place of birth: San Fernando, Argentina
- Height: 1.74 m (5 ft 8 1/2 in)
- Position: Midfielder

Team information
- Current team: Juventud Antoniana

Youth career
- Tigre

Senior career*
Years	Team	Apps	(Gls)
2018–2021	Tigre	10	(0)
2021–2022	Bijelo Brdo	10	(0)
2022–	Juventud Antoniana	2	(0)
- * Club domestic league appearances and goals as of 20:58, 13 May 2022 (UTC)

Jorge Iván Bolaño (born 15 May 1998) is an Argentine professional footballer who plays as a midfielder for Juventud Antoniana.

== Career ==
Bolaño's career started with Tigre in the Primera División. He was promoted into their first-team midway through 2017–18, making his professional debut on 26 January 2018 during a home defeat to Banfield. He made seven further appearances in his opening campaign.

In August 2021, Bolaño joined Croatian club NK BSK Bijelo Brdo. He returned to Argentina in March 2022, after signing with Juventud Antoniana.

== Personal life ==
In August 2020, it was confirmed that Bolaño had tested positive for COVID-19 amid the pandemic; he was asymptomatic.

== Career statistics ==
As of 4 September 2020.

Club statistics
Club	Season	League			Cup		League Cup		Continental		Other		Total	
Club	Season	Division	Apps	Goals	Apps	Goals	Apps	Goals	Apps	Goals	Apps	Goals	Apps	Goals
Tigre	2017–18	Primera División	8	0	0	0	—		—		0	0	8	0
Tigre	2018–19	Primera División	1	0	1	0	0	0	—		0	0	2	0
Tigre	2019–20	Primera B Nacional	1	0	0	0	0	0	1 (Note: Appearance(s) in the Copa Libertadores)	0	0	0	2	0
Career total			10	0	1	0	0	0	1	0	0	0	12	0
