= Cristian Nunez =

Cristian Nunez may refer to:

- Cristian Nuñez (soccer, born 1988), Canadian soccer player
- Cristian Núñez (footballer, born 1980), Argentine footballer
- Cristian Núñez (footballer, born 1997), Paraguayan footballer
- Cristian Núñez (footballer, born 2000), Paraguayan footballer

== See also ==
- Christian Núñez (born 1982), Uruguayan footballer
