= 2017–18 Club Atlético Tigre season =

Club Atlético Tigre
2017–18 season
- Chairman: Rodrigo Molinos
- Manager: Ricardo Caruso Lombardi (until 8 December 2017); Cristian Ledesma (from 13 December 2017)
- Stadium: Estadio José Dellagiovanna
- Primera División: 27th
- Copa Argentina: Round of 64
- Top goalscorer: League: Two players (2); All: Two players (2)

The 2017–18 season was Club Atlético Tigre's 12th consecutive season in the top-flight of Argentine football. The season covers the period from 1 July 2017 to 30 June 2018.

== Current squad ==
As of 22 August 2017.

Note: Flags indicate national team as defined under FIFA eligibility rules; some limited exceptions apply. Players may hold more than one non-FIFA nationality.

No.	Pos.	Nation	Player
1	GK	ARG	Javier García
2	DF	ARG	Erik Godoy
3	DF	ARG	Juan Blengio
7	FW	ARG	Carlos Luna
8	MF	ARG	Martín Galmarini
12	DF	ARG	Andrés Zanini
15	FW	ARG	Lucas Janson
18	MF	ARG	Sebastián Balmaceda
20	FW	ARG	Ramón Mierez
26	MF	ARG	Lucas Menossi
27	MF	ARG	Agustín Cardozo
28	DF	ARG	Santiago Villarreal
36	FW	ARG	Walter Mazzantti
—	DF	ARG	Alexis Niz
—	DF	URU	Carlos Rodríguez (on loan from Plaza Colonia)

No.	Pos.	Nation	Player
—	MF	ARG	Daniel Imperiale
—	FW	ARG	Denis Stracqualursi (on loan from Santa Fe)
—	MF	ARG	Ezequiel Rodríguez
—	FW	ARG	Federico González
—	DF	ARG	Gastón Bojanich
—	MF	URU	Hamilton Pereira
—	FW	ARG	Ivo Hongn
—	MF	ARG	Jacobo Mansilla
—	GK	ARG	Julio Chiarini
—	FW	ARG	Lucas Passerini
—	DF	ARG	Manuel González
—	DF	URU	Mathías Abero
—	MF	ARG	Matías Pérez García
—	DF	ARG	Maximiliano Caire
—	MF	ARG	Rodrigo Depetris

=== Out on loan ===
Note: Flags indicate national team as defined under FIFA eligibility rules; some limited exceptions apply. Players may hold more than one non-FIFA nationality.

No.	Pos.	Nation	Player
29	MF	ARG	Diego Sosa (at Unión Española until 30 June 2018)
35	FW	ARG	Claudio Spinelli (at San Martín until 30 June 2018)
—	MF	URU	Jorge Rodríguez (at Cerro until 31 December 2017)

No.	Pos.	Nation	Player
—	MF	ARG	Kevin Itabel (at Ferro Carril Oeste until 30 June 2018)
—	GK	ARG	Nelson Ibáñez (at Newell's Old Boys until 30 June 2018)

== Transfers ==
=== In ===
Date	Pos.	Name	From	Fee
1 July 2017	DF	(Argentina) Alexis Niz	(Argentina) Sarmiento	Undisclosed
1 July 2017	GK	(Argentina) Julio Chiarini	(Argentina) Sarmiento	Undisclosed
1 July 2017	MF	(Argentina) Rodrigo Depetris	(Argentina) Sarmiento	Undisclosed
4 July 2017	DF	(Uruguay) Mathías Abero	(Argentina) Atlético de Rafaela	Undisclosed
5 July 2017	MF	(Argentina) Daniel Imperiale	(Argentina) Gimnasia y Esgrima	Undisclosed
5 July 2017	FW	(Argentina) Ivo Hongn	(Argentina) Pacífico	Undisclosed
5 July 2017	DF	(Argentina) Manuel González	(Argentina) Pacífico	Undisclosed
11 July 2017	DF	(Argentina) Gastón Bojanich	(Argentina) Temperley	Undisclosed
13 July 2017	MF	(Uruguay) Hamilton Pereira	(Argentina) Sarmiento	Undisclosed
18 July 2017	MF	(Argentina) Matías Pérez García	(United States) Orlando City	Undisclosed
19 July 2017	MF	(Argentina) Jacobo Mansilla	(Argentina) Newell's Old Boys	Undisclosed
22 July 2017	FW	(Argentina) Lucas Passerini	(Argentina) Estudiantes	Undisclosed
26 July 2017	MF	(Argentina) Ezequiel Rodríguez	(Argentina) Atlanta	Undisclosed
30 July 2017	DF	(Argentina) Maximiliano Caire	(Argentina) Vélez Sarsfield	Undisclosed

=== Out ===
Date	Pos.	Name	To	Fee
1 July 2017	MF	(Argentina) Diego Castaño	Released	
1 July 2017	DF	(Argentina) Ignacio Bonadío	Released	
1 July 2017	DF	(Argentina) Iván Dubois	Released	
3 July 2017	DF	(Argentina) Emiliano Papa	(Argentina) Arsenal de Sarandí	Undisclosed
10 July 2017	MF	(Argentina) Alexis Castro	(Argentina) San Lorenzo	Undisclosed
13 July 2017	FW	(Colombia) Sebastián Rincón	(Portugal) Vitória Guimarães	Undisclosed
16 July 2017	DF	(Argentina) Bruno Urribarri	(Argentina) Patronato	Undisclosed
25 July 2017	MF	(Argentina) Emiliano Ellacopulos	(Argentina) Aldosivi	Undisclosed
30 July 2017	MF	(Argentina) Diego Morales	(Argentina) Colón	Undisclosed

=== Loan in ===
Date from	Date to	Pos.	Name	From
14 July 2017	30 June 2018	DF	(Uruguay) Carlos Rodríguez	(Uruguay) Plaza Colonia
30 July 2017	30 June 2018	FW	(Argentina) Denis Stracqualursi	(Colombia) Santa Fe

=== Loan out ===
Date from	Date to	Pos.	Name	To
22 July 2017	30 June 2018	GK	(Argentina) Nelson Ibáñez	(Argentina) Newell's Old Boys

== Friendlies ==
=== Pre-season ===
Win Draw Loss

29 July 2017 Friendly	Tigre (Argentina)	5–0	(Argentina) Claypole	Buenos Aires, Argentina
10:00	M. Abero 4'; R. Mierez 11', 39'; L. Menossi 17'; Galváni 50'	Report		Stadium: Hindú Club

29 July 2017 Friendly	Tigre (Argentina)	3–2	(Argentina) Claypole	Buenos Aires, Argentina
11:15	L. Janson 25'; R. Depetris 49'; L. Passerini 53'	Report	55'	Stadium: Hindú Club

2 August 2017 Friendly	Tigre (Argentina)	2–1	(Argentina) Talleres	Buenos Aires, Argentina
10:00	A. Niz 29'; L. Janson 60'	Report	49'	Stadium: Hindú Club

2 August 2017 Friendly	Tigre (Argentina)	4–0	(Argentina) Talleres	Buenos Aires, Argentina
11:30	R. Depetris 8'; M. Echeverría 17'; D. Imperiale 24'; R. Mierez 30'	Report		Stadium: Hindú Club

== Primera División ==
=== League table ===
Pos	Team	Pld	W	D	L	GF	GA	GD	Pts
22	Lanús	27	6	11	10	20	37	−17	29
23	Gimnasia y Esgrima (LP)	27	7	6	14	28	43	−15	27
24	Tigre	27	4	12	11	26	33	−7	24
25	Temperley	27	5	8	14	22	46	−24	23
26	Chacarita Juniors	27	4	6	17	23	40	−17	18

Source: AFA
Rules for classification: 1) points; 2) play-off (only if needed to decide championship); 3) goal difference; 4) goals scored; 5) head-to-head points; 6) head-to-head goal difference; 7) head-to-head goals scored.

=== Results by matchday ===
Matchday	1	2	3	4	5	6	7	8	9	10	11	12	13	14	15	16	17	18	19	20	21	22	23	24	25	26	27
Ground	H	A	H	A	H	A	H	A	H	A	H	A	H														
Result	L	D	L	D	D	L	D	D	W	L	L	L															
Position	28	24	25	25	25	25	23	24	23	24	26	27															

Updated to match(es) played on 12 December 2017. Source: Soccerway
A = Away; H = Home; W = Win; D = Draw; L = Loss

25 August 2017 1	Tigre	0–3	Vélez Sarsfield	Buenos Aires, Argentina
19:05		Report	M. Romero 52', 75'; F. Andrada 68'	Stadium: Estadio José Dellagiovanna; Referee: Darío Herrera (Argentina)

10 September 2017 2	Chacarita Juniors	1–1	Tigre	Villa Maipú, Argentina
11:05	L. Martínez 88'	Report	C. Rodríguez 66'	Stadium: Estadio de Chacarita Juniors; Referee: Fernando Rapallini (Argentina)

15 September 2017 3	Tigre (Argentina)	1–3	(Argentina) Patronato	Buenos Aires, Argentina
19:05	J. Blengio 45'	Report	M. Rivero 16', 90+4'; A. Balboa 59'	Stadium: Estadio José Dellagiovanna; Referee: Jorge Baliño (Argentina)

22 September 2017 4	Belgrano (Argentina)	0–0	(Argentina) Tigre	Córdoba, Argentina
19:05		Report		Stadium: El Gigante de Alberdi; Referee: Federico Beligoy (Argentina)

1 October 2017 5	Tigre (Argentina)	1–1	(Argentina) River Plate	Buenos Aires, Argentina
20:05	L. Janson 35'	Report	I. Scocco 10' (pen.)	Stadium: Estadio José Dellagiovanna; Referee: Ariel Penel (Argentina)

14 October 2017 6	Racing Club (Argentina)	1–0	(Argentina) Tigre	Avellaneda, Argentina
20:05	A. Ibargüen 80'	Report		Stadium: Estadio Presidente Juan Domingo Perón; Referee: Germán Delfino (Argentina)

30 October 2017 7	Tigre (Argentina)	1–1	(Argentina) Rosario Central	Buenos Aires, Argentina
21:05	L. Menossi 16'	Report	M. Ruben 80'	Stadium: Estadio José Dellagiovanna; Referee: Néstor Pitana (Argentina)

6 November 2017 8	Arsenal de Sarandí (Argentina)	0–0	(Argentina) Tigre	Avellaneda, Argentina
17:05		Report		Stadium: Estadio Julio Humberto Grondona; Referee: Patricio Loustau (Argentina)

19 November 2017 9	Tigre (Argentina)	2–0	(Argentina) Estudiantes	Buenos Aires, Argentina
17:00	M. Pérez García 27' (pen.); I. Gómez 65' (o.g.)	Report		Stadium: Estadio José Dellagiovanna; Referee: Andrés Merlos (Argentina)

24 November 2017 10	Colón (Argentina)	3–1	(Argentina) Tigre	Santa Fe, Argentina
21:30	P. Ledesma 52'; D. Vera 65' (pen.); C. Bernardi 70'	Report	M. Caire 36'	Stadium: Estadio Brigadier General Estanislao López; Referee: Ariel Penel (Argentina)

3 December 2017 11	Tigre (Argentina)	1–2	(Argentina) San Lorenzo	Buenos Aires, Argentina
17:00	L. Janson 45'	Report	P. Díaz 39'; E. Cerutti 55'	Stadium: Estadio José Dellagiovanna; Referee: Fernando Echenique (Argentina)

8 December 2017 12	Temperley (Argentina)	2–1	(Argentina) Tigre	Turdera, Argentina
17:00	A. Arregui 14'; J. Sánchez Sotelo 40' (pen.)	Report	L. Menossi 7'	Stadium: Estadio Alfredo Beranger; Referee: Juan Pompei (Argentina)

January 2018 13	Tigre (Argentina)	–	(Argentina) Banfield	Buenos Aires, Argentina
		Report		Stadium: Estadio José Dellagiovanna

== Copa Argentina ==
Win Draw Loss

–
