= Juan Marcarie =

Argentine footballer

Juan Ignacio Marcarié Carrá (born 25 September 1985, in Buenos Aires) is an Argentine footballer who currently plays for Ecuadorian side SD Aucas as an attacking midfielder.

After playing abroad in Venezuela and Uruguay, Marcarie moved to Ecuador, where he would make his competitive debut for Mushuc Runa in 2014. In 2016, Marcarie cancelled his contract with Ecuadorian side Fuerza Amarilla after a strong earthquake and returned to his native Argentina.

== Teams ==
- (Argentina) Tristán Suárez 2005–2006
- (Argentina) Berazategui 2006–2007
- (Argentina) Ituzaingó 2007–2008
- (Argentina) Colegiales 2008–2009
- (Argentina) Berazategui 2009
- (Argentina) San Miguel 2010
- (Venezuela) Estudiantes de Mérida 2010
- (Argentina) Tristán Suárez 2011
- Atlético Venezuela 2011–2012
- (Argentina) Club Atlético N. de la Riestra 2012
- (Uruguay) El Tanque Sisley 2012–2014
- (Ecuador) Mushuc Runa 2014
- (Ecuador) SD Aucas 2015
- (Ecuador) Fuerza Amarilla 2016-
