= Federico Turienzo =

Argentine footballer

Personal information
- Full name: Federico Ezequiel Turienzo
- Date of birth: 6 February 1983 (age 43)
- Place of birth: La Plata, Argentina
- Height: 1.88 m (6 ft 2 in)
- Position: Centre forward

Team information
- Current team: Villa San Carlos

Senior career*
Years	Team	Apps	(Gls)
2001–2004	Gimnasia y Esgrima (LP)	50	(7)
2005–2006	Brighton & Hove Albion	4	(0)
2006	Teramo	16	(0)
2007–2008	Salernitana	26	(2)
2009	Arezzo	11	(1)
2009–2011	Cavese	26	(5)
2012–2013	Agropecuario Argentino	25	(10)
2013–2014	Mitre	?	(?)
2014–2015	Desamparados	?	(?)
2015	Deportivo Merlo	24	(8)
2016	Morón	8	(0)
2016–2017	Deportivo Español	31	(8)
2017–	Villa San Carlos	12	(6)
- * Club domestic league appearances and goals as of 3 January 2018

Federico Ezequiel Turienzo (born 6 February 1983 in La Plata) is an Argentine football player. He is a 6'2" tall, 12 stone striker who currently plays for Villa San Carlos in Argentina.

Turienzo played for Argentine side Gimnasia y Esgrima La Plata from 2002 to August 2005, when he moved to Brighton & Hove Albion, having been recommended to the club by former Juventus star Zibi Boniek, he signed a two-year contract.
