= Daniel Imperiale =

Argentine footballer

Personal information
- Date of birth: 22 April 1988 (age 38)
- Place of birth: Guaymallén, Argentina
- Height: 1.90 m (6 ft 3 in)
- Position: Right midfielder

Team information
- Current team: Deportes Iquique
- Number: 5

Senior career*
Years	Team	Apps	(Gls)
2008–2011	CSD Guaymallen	77	(7)
2011–2012	Sportivo Italiano	20	(0)
2012–2014	San Martín Mendoza	29	(4)
2014	Deportivo Maipú	0	(0)
2014	Tristán Suárez	16	(1)
2015	Independiente Rivadavia	29	(4)
2016	Quilmes	16	(2)
2016–2017	Gimnasia La Plata	16	(0)
2017–2018	Tigre	12	(0)
2018–2019	Independiente Rivadavia	27	(4)
2019–2020	Cafetaleros de Chiapas	14	(0)
2020–2021	Independiente Rivadavia	36	(7)
2022–	Deportes Iquique	15	(3)
- * Club domestic league appearances and goals as of 17:25, 4 August 2022 (UTC)

Daniel Imperiale (born 22 April 1988) is an Argentine footballer who plays for Deportes Iquique as a midfielder.
