= Lautaro Baeza =

Argentine naturalized Chilean footballer

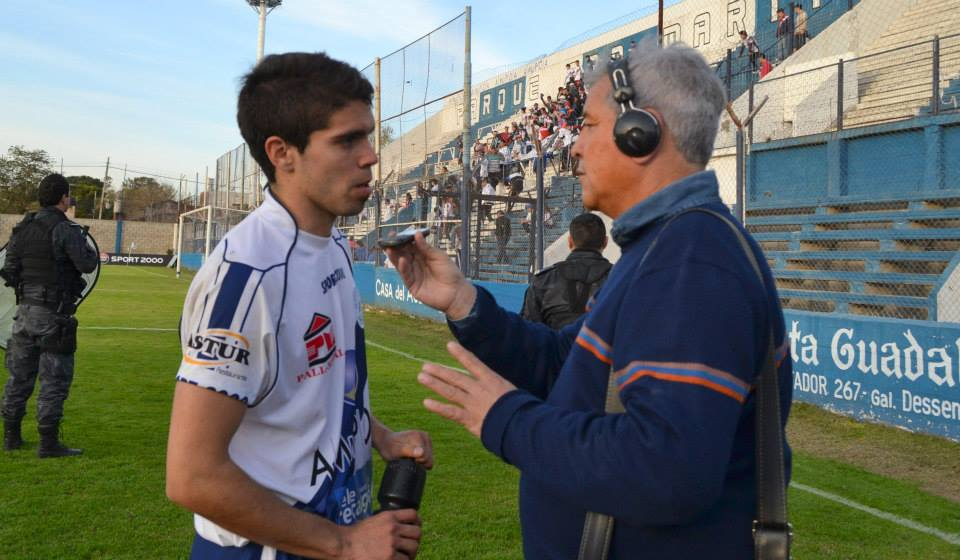

Personal information
- Full name: Lautaro Manuel Baeza
- Date of birth: 17 February 1990 (age 36)
- Place of birth: Merlo, Argentina
- Height: 1.72 m (5 ft 8 in)
- Position: Midfielder

Senior career*
Years	Team	Apps	(Gls)
2010–2012	Vélez Sarsfield	0	(0)
2011–2012	→ Platense (loan)	0	(0)
2012–2013	Sportivo Las Parejas	14	(0)
2013–2014	Rangers	15	(0)
2015	Deportivo Merlo	31	(4)
2016	Sportivo Patria	11	(1)
2016–2019	Sportivo Barracas	69	(4)
Total		140	(9)
- * Club domestic league appearances and goals

Lautaro Manuel Baeza (born 17 February 1990) is an Argentine–born Chilean former footballer. His last club was Sportivo Barracas.
