= Manuel González (footballer, born 1991) =

Argentine footballer (born 1991)

Personal information
- Date of birth: 16 March 1991 (age 35)
- Place of birth: Buenos Aires, Argentina
- Height: 1.90 m (6 ft 3 in)
- Position: Centre-back

Team information
- Current team: Bisceglie

Senior career*
Years	Team	Apps	(Gls)
2008–2010	All Boys		
2010	General Lamadrid		
2011	Atlanta		
2011	Deportivo Español		
2012–2013	Ferro Carril Oeste		
2014	Regatas	4	(0)
2014	San Jorge		
2015	Unión Aconquija	2	(0)
2015–2016	Villa Mitre	35	(4)
2016	Estudiantes	1	(0)
2017	Pacífico		
2017–2018	Tigre	0	(0)
2017–2018	→ Acassuso (loan)	2	(0)
2018	San Carlos	13	(1)
2019	Egersunds IK	7	(1)
2019	Egersunds IK 2	3	(0)
2019–2020	Fasano	25	(1)
2020–2021	Taranto	8	(1)
2021–2022	Gelbison	24	(4)
2022–2023	Trapani	28	(1)
2023–2024	Campobasso	23	(3)
2024–2025	Olbia	7	(0)
- * Club domestic league appearances and goals as of 22 March 2026

Manuel González (born 16 March 1991) is an Argentine professional footballer who plays as a centre-back for Italian Eccellenza Apulia club AS Bisceglie Calcio 1913.

== Career ==
González began playing for All Boys in 2008, remaining for two years. 2010 saw him join General Lamadrid, which preceded spells with Atlanta, Deportivo Español and Ferro Carril Oeste. In 2014, González made four appearances for Regatas in Torneo Argentino B. He was on the move soon after, signing contracts with San Jorge and Unión Aconquija. Torneo Federal B's Villa Mitre signed González in 2015. Four goals in thirty-seven fixtures followed across 2015 and the succeeding 2016 Torneo Federal A season after promotion. He made his debut for Estudiantes in September 2016 versus Villa San Carlos, after joining in June.

González had a short spell with Pacífico in 2017, prior to joining Argentine Primera División side Tigre in July 2017. However, he was loaned out to Acassuso of Primera B Metropolitana in the following months. He was selected in two encounters for Acassuso during 2017–18 as they reached the promotion play-offs, where they were eliminated by UAI Urquiza. After then returning to Tigre, González left Argentine football for the first time in 2018 after signing for Costa Rica's San Carlos of Liga FPD. He signed with Norwegian 2. divisjon club Egersunds IK on 19 January 2019. His bow came in an away win against Vidar on 22 April.

González netted his first Egersunds IK goal on 18 May in a 4–0 league win over Sola. After nine appearances for the Norwegians, as well as three for their reserve team in the 4. divisjon, González switched Norway for Italy by agreeing contract terms with Serie D's Fasano. He scored one goal in twenty-five matches for the club, as they placed eighth in a campaign that ended prematurely due to the COVID-19 pandemic.

On 12 August 2020, González moved across the division to Taranto.

On 15 July 2022, González signed with Serie D club Trapani.

On 6 July 2023, he signed with Serie D club Campobasso FC, winning the league and getting promoted to Serie C.

On 23 August 2024, Gonzalez signed with Olbia Calcio 1905.

On 6 August 2025, he signed with Eccellenza Apulia club AS Bisceglie Calcio 1913.

== Career statistics ==
As of 6 February 2021.

Club statistics
Club	Season	League			Cup		League Cup		Continental		Other		Total	
Club	Season	Division	Apps	Goals	Apps	Goals	Apps	Goals	Apps	Goals	Apps	Goals	Apps	Goals
Regatas	2013–14	Torneo Argentino B	4	0	0	0	—		—		0	0	4	0
Unión Aconquija	2015	Torneo Federal A	2	0	0	0	—		—		0	0	2	0
Villa Mitre	2015	Torneo Federal B	24	4	0	0	—		—		0	0	24	4
Villa Mitre	2016	Torneo Federal A	11	0	2	0	—		—		0	0	13	0
Villa Mitre	Total		35	4	2	0	—		—		0	0	37	4
Estudiantes	2016–17	Primera B Metropolitana	1	0	0	0	—		—		0	0	1	0
Tigre	2017–18	Primera División	0	0	0	0	—		—		0	0	0	0
Acassuso (loan)	2017–18	Primera B Metropolitana	2	0	0	0	—		—		0	0	2	0
San Carlos	2018–19	Liga FPD	9	0	—		—		—		0	0	9	0
Egersunds IK	2019	2. divisjon	7	1	2	0	—		—		0	0	9	1
Egersunds IK 2	2019	4. divisjon	3	0	—		—		—		0	0	3	0
Fasano	2019–20	Serie D	25	1	0	0	0	0	—		0	0	25	1
Taranto	2020–21	Serie D	2	0	0	0	0	0	—		0	0	2	0
Career total			89	6	4	0	0	0	—		0	0	93	6
