= Humberto Zuccarelli =

Argentine footballer

Personal information
- Full name: Humberto Zuccarelli
- Date of birth: 18 March 1948 (age 78)
- Place of birth: La Plata, Argentina
- Position: Defender

Youth career
- Estudiantes LP

Senior career*
Years	Team	Apps	(Gls)
1966–1970	Estudiantes LP		
1971–1973	Colón		
1974–1975	Gimnasia La Plata		
1976	Banfield		
1976	Huracán CR		
1977	Cúcuta Deportivo		
1978	Independiente Medellín		

International career
1967	Argentina Pan American	3	(0)

Managerial career
- 1981: Estudiantes LP (assistant)
- 1982: Temperley (assistant)
- 1983–1984: Temperley
- 1985–1986: Estudiantes LP
- 1986–1988: Quilmes
- 1988–1990: Unión Santa Fe
- 1990–1991: Estudiantes LP
- 1991–1992: Unión Santa Fe
- 1992–1994: Quilmes
- 1994–1995: Gimnasia y Tiro
- 1996–1997: Huracán Corrientes
- 1997–1998: Talleres
- 1998–2000: Atlético Tucumán
- 2000–2001: Gimnasia de Jujuy
- 2001–2002: Atlético Tucumán
- 2002: San Martín SJ
- 2003–2006: Quilmes (sporting director)
- 2005: Quilmes (interim)
- 2006–2008: Arsenal de Sarandí (assistant)
- 2008–2009: Rosario Central (assistant)
- 2009–2010: Santiago Wanderers
- 2010–2011: Chacarita Juniors
- 2011: Atlético Rafaela (assistant)
- 2015: Guaraní Antonio Franco
- 2017–2018: Quilmes (sport manager)
- * Club domestic league appearances and goals

Humberto Zuccarelli (born 18 March 1948) is an Argentine former football manager and player who played as a defender. Besides Argentina, he played for clubs in Colombia.

== Playing career ==
=== Club ===
- (Argentina) Estudiantes de La Plata 1966–1970
- (Argentina) Colón 1971–1973
- (Argentina) Gimnasia y Esgrima La Plata 1974–1975
- (Argentina) Banfield 1976
- (Argentina) Huracán de Comodoro Rivadavia 1976
- (Colombia) Cúcuta Deportivo 1977
- (Colombia) Independiente Medellín 1978

=== International ===
- Argentina 1967

== Managerial career ==
- (Argentina) Temperley 1983–1984
- (Argentina) Estudiantes de La Plata 1985–1986
- (Argentina) Quilmes 1986–1988
- (Argentina) Unión de Santa Fe 1988–1990
- (Argentina) Estudiantes de La Plata 1990–1991
- (Argentina) Unión de Santa Fe 1991–1992
- (Argentina) Quilmes 1992–1994
- (Argentina) Gimnasia y Tiro 1994–1995
- (Argentina) Huracán Corrientes 1996–1997
- (Argentina) Talleres 1997–1998
- (Argentina) Atlético Tucumán 1998–2000
- (Argentina) Gimnasia y Esgrima de Jujuy 2000–2001
- (Argentina) Atlético Tucumán 2001–2002
- (Argentina) San Martín de San Juan 2002
- (Argentina) Quilmes (interim) 2005
- (Chile) Santiago Wanderers 2009–2010
- (Argentina) Chacarita Juniors 2010–2011
- (Argentina) Guaraní Antonio Franco 2015

== Personal life ==
Humberto is the father of the also footballer and manager Martín Zuccarelli.
