= Javier Páez =

Argentine footballer

Personal information
- Full name: Javier Marcelo Páez
- Date of birth: September 23, 1975 (age 51)
- Place of birth: Merlo, Argentina
- Position: Centre back

Senior career*
Years	Team	Apps	(Gls)
1992–1994	Deportivo Merlo	40	(1)
1995–1997	Independiente	15	(0)
1997	Deportivo Español	13	(0)
1998–1999	Talleres de Córdoba	20	(0)
1999–2002	Independiente	64	(2)
2002–2003	Deportivo Quito	41	(5)
2003–2006	Olimpo	90	(5)
2006–2007	Hapoel Tel Aviv	23	(2)
2007–2008	Olimpo	29	(3)
2008–	Atlético Tucumán	97	(6)
2011	→ Chacarita Juniors (loan)	13	(1)
2012–2013	Gimnasia de Jujuy	43	(3)
2013–2014	Ferro Carril Oeste	52	(1)
- * Club domestic league appearances and goals as of 22 November 2011

Javier Marcelo Páez (born September 23, 1975, in Merlo) is an Argentine football defender.
