= Thomas Ortega =

Argentine footballer

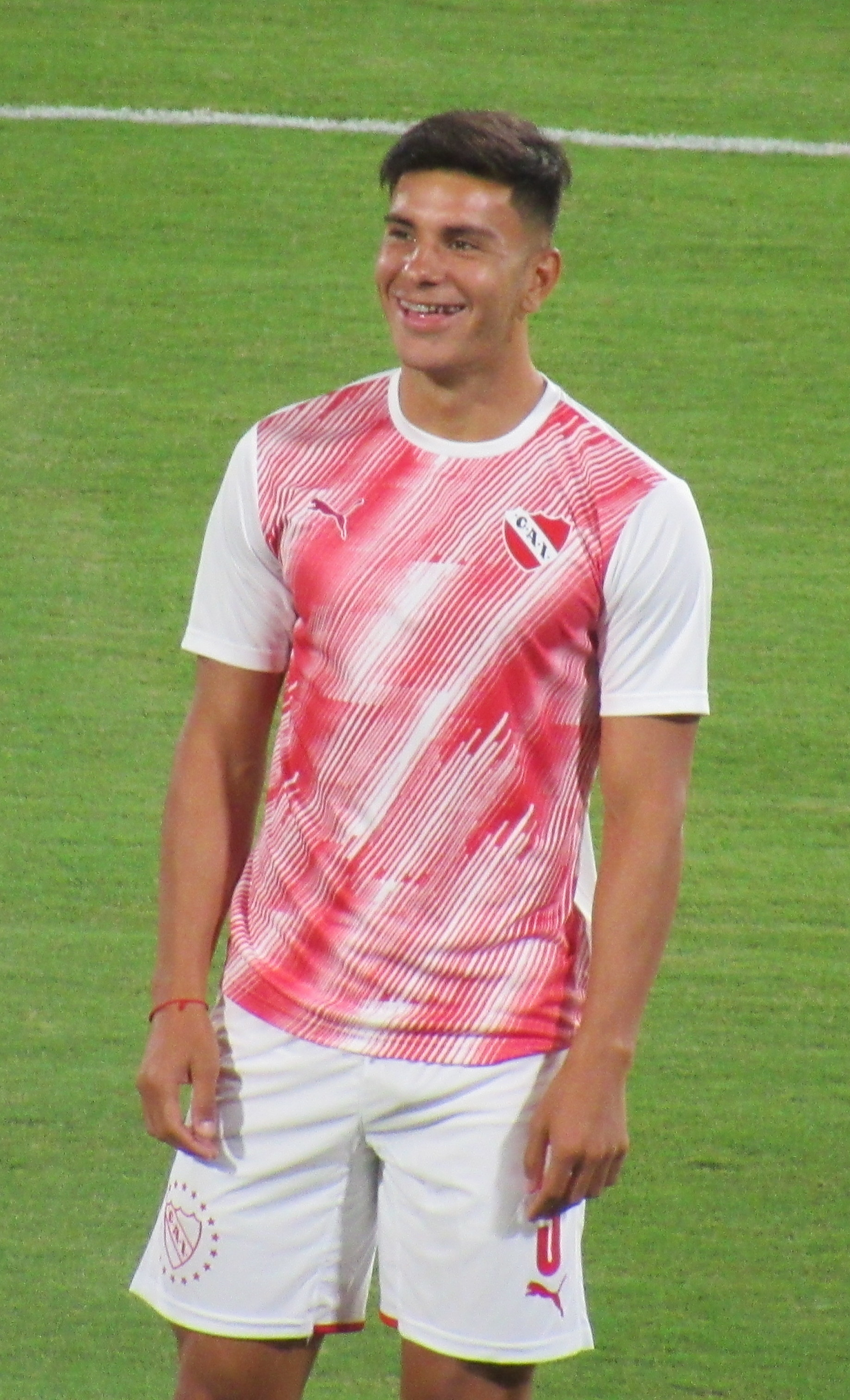
- Ortega in 2022

Personal information
- Full name: Thomás Sebastián Ortega
- Date of birth: 6 December 2000 (age 25)
- Place of birth: Claypole, Argentina
- Height: 1.85 m (6 ft 1 in)
- Position: Left-back

Team information
- Current team: Quilmes
- Number: 3

Youth career
- Independiente

Senior career*
Years	Team	Apps	(Gls)
2020–2025	Independiente	34	(0)
2022	→ Instituto (loan)	7	(0)
2023–2024	→ Tristán Suárez (loan)	50	(0)
2025–2026	Independiente Rivadavia	19	(0)
2026–	Quilmes	4	(0)
- * Club domestic league appearances and goals as of 17:55, 16 March 2026 (UTC)

Thomas Sebastián Ortega (born 6 December 2000) is an Argentine professional footballer who plays as a left-back for Argentine Primera División club Quilmes.

== Professional career ==
On 8 January 2020, Ortega signed his first professional contract with Independiente.

Ortega made his professional debut with Independiente in a 1-0 Argentine Primera División loss to Racing Club on 9 February 2020.

In June 2022, Ortega joined Primera Nacional side Instituto on loan for the rest of 2023 with a purchase option.

In February 2023, Independiente sent Ortega on a one-year loan to Primera Nacional club Tristan Suárez.

In January 2025, Ortega joined Independiente Rivadavia, signing as a free agent.
