= Gastón Bojanich =

Argentine footballer (born 1985)

Personal information
- Full name: Gastón Darío Bojanich
- Date of birth: 23 April 1985 (age 41)
- Place of birth: Buenos Aires, Argentina
- Height: 1.91 m (6 ft 3 in)
- Position: Centre-back

Team information
- Current team: Villa Dálmine

Youth career
- San Lorenzo

Senior career*
Years	Team	Apps	(Gls)
2004–2008	General Lamadrid	108	(7)
2009–2014	Barracas Central	152	(13)
2014–2017	Temperley	84	(0)
2017	Tigre	10	(0)
2018–2019	Argentinos Juniors	29	(1)
2019–2020	Barracas Central	15	(0)
2020–2021	Nueva Chicago	10	(1)
2021–	Temperley	39	(0)
- * Club domestic league appearances and goals as of 17:47, 3 August 2022 (UTC)

Gastón Darío Bojanich (born 23 April 1985) is an Argentine professional footballer who plays as a centre-back for Villa Dálmine.

== Career ==
Bojanich spent a period of his youth career in the system of San Lorenzo. However, he started off his senior career in Primera C Metropolitana with General Lamadrid in 2004. He departed the club four years later, following seven goals in one hundred and eight matches. Bojanich joined fellow Primera C Metropolitana team Barracas Central in 2009. He won promotion to Primera B Metropolitana in the 2010–11 season. Bojanich netted seven goals in three seasons in the third tier. On 30 June 2014, Primera B Nacional side Temperley signed Bojanich. His spell with Temperley lasted three years, yielding eighty-seven appearances.

He departed Temperley in 2017, subsequently having a short five-month spell with Tigre. In January 2018, Argentinos Juniors of the Primera División became the fifth senior club of Bojanich's career. He scored his first goal in his third appearance, versus Atlético Tucumán on 17 February. After spending the 2019–20 season back with Barracas Central, now of Primera B Nacional, Bojanich headed to Nueva Chicago in August 2020.

== Career statistics ==
As of 30 August 2020.

Club statistics
Club	Season	League			Cup		League Cup		Continental		Other		Total	
Club	Season	Division	Apps	Goals	Apps	Goals	Apps	Goals	Apps	Goals	Apps	Goals	Apps	Goals
Barracas Central	2012–13	Primera B Metropolitana	24	3	0	0	—		—		0	0	24	3
Barracas Central	2013–14	Primera B Metropolitana	37	3	0	0	—		—		0	0	37	3
Barracas Central	Total		61	6	0	0	—		—		0	0	61	6
Temperley	2014	Primera B Nacional	19	0	0	0	—		—		0	0	19	0
Temperley	2015	Primera División	27	0	2	0	—		—		0	0	29	0
Temperley	2016	Primera División	16	0	0	0	—		—		0	0	16	0
Temperley	2016–17	Primera División	22	0	1	0	—		—		0	0	23	0
Temperley	Total		84	0	3	0	—		—		0	0	87	0
Tigre	2017–18	Primera División	10	0	0	0	—		—		0	0	10	0
Argentinos Juniors	2017–18	Primera División	14	1	0	0	—		—		0	0	14	1
Argentinos Juniors	2018–19	Primera División	15	0	3	0	—		2 (Note: Appearance(s) in Copa Sudamericana)	0	0	0	20	0
Argentinos Juniors	Total		29	1	3	0	—		2	0	0	0	34	1
Barracas Central	2019–20	Primera B Nacional	15	0	1	0	—		—		0	0	16	0
Nueva Chicago	2020–21	Primera B Nacional	0	0	0	0	—		—		0	0	0	0
Career total			199	7	7	0	—		2	0	0	0	208	7

== Honours ==
Barracas Central

- Primera C Metropolitana: 2009–10
