= Franco Quiroga =

Argentine footballer

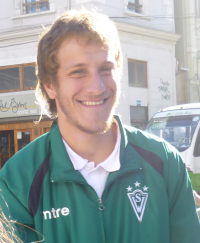

Personal information
- Full name: Franco Tomás Quiroga
- Date of birth: December 23, 1986 (age 39)
- Place of birth: Cutral Có, Argentina
- Height: 1.86 m (6 ft 1 in)
- Position: Midfielder

Team information
- Current team: Tristán Suárez

Youth career
- Temperley

Senior career*
Years	Team	Apps	(Gls)
2005–2006	Temperley	21	(1)
2006–2007	Olimpo	21	(0)
2007–2008	Nueva Chicago	32	(2)
2008–2009	Argentinos Juniors	24	(1)
2010–2011	Santiago Wanderers	37	(2)
2012–2013	Independiente Rivadavia	51	(1)
2013–2015	San Martín SJ	55	(1)
2015–2017	Atlético Tucumán	43	(1)
2017–2018	Nueva Chicago	15	(0)
2018–	Tristán Suárez	88	(2)
- * Club domestic league appearances and goals as of 18:31, 4 August 2022 (UTC)

Franco Tomás Quiroga (born 23 November 1986 in Cutral Có, Neuquén) is an Argentine football midfielder who plays for Tristán Suárez.

== Career ==
Quiroga started his playing career in 2005 with Club Atlético Temperley in the regionalised third division of Argentine football.

In 2006, he joined Olimpo de Bahía Blanca where he was part of the squad that won back to back championships to secure promotion to the Argentine Primera. Quiroga missed out on the opportunity to play in the Primera when he joined Nueva Chicago.

In 2008, he joined Argentinos Juniors where he made his debut in the Primera on 16 August in a 4–1 win over Vélez Sársfield. He got his first taste of international club football playing a number of games in the Copa Sudamericana 2008 where Argentinos reached the semi-finals.

In 2010, he joined Chilean club Santiago Wanderers on the recommendation of Argentinos manager Claudio Borghi.

== Honours ==
Season	Team	Title
Apertura 2006	Olimpo	Primera B Nacional
Clausura 2007	Olimpo	Primera B Nacional
