= Mariano Bettini =

Argentine professional footballer

Personal information
- Date of birth: 19 January 1996 (age 30)
- Place of birth: Buenos Aires, Argentina
- Height: 1.80 m (5 ft 11 in)
- Position: Right-back

Youth career
- –2017: Boca Juniors

Senior career*
Years	Team	Apps	(Gls)
2017–2019	Atlanta	35	(0)
2019–2022	Tristán Suárez	84	(0)
2023–2024	Alvarado	52	(1)
2025	Güemes	22	(0)
2026	FK Csíkszereda	2	(0)
- * Club domestic league appearances and goals as of 14 February 2026

Mariano Bettini (born 19 January 1996) is an Argentine professional footballer who plays as a right-back.

== Career ==
Bettini came through the youth ranks of Boca Juniors. On 6 August 2017, Bettini completed a move to Primera B Metropolitana side Atlanta. His professional debut arrived on 4 September 2017 in a home victory over Colegiales, playing the full duration of a fixture which originally ended in goalless draw before the AFA awarded Atlanta the three points - Colegiales had selected an ineligible player in Germán Mendoza.
