= Aldo Visconti =

Argentine footballer (born 1977)

Personal information
- Full name: Aldo Luis Visconti
- Date of birth: 26 March 1977 (age 49)
- Place of birth: Resistencia, Chaco, Argentina
- Positions: Forward; centre forward

Team information
- Current team: Chaco For Ever
- Number: 7
- ‡ National team caps and goals as of 27 December 2011 (UTC)

Aldo Visconti (born March 26, 1977) is an Argentine footballer currently playing for Chaco For Ever of the Torneo Argentino A, the regionalised third division in Argentina.

== Teams ==
Team	Country	Year
Central Norte (Chaco)	Argentina	2000–2003
Chaco For Ever	Argentina	2004
Sportivo Patria	Argentina	2004–2006
Tigre	Argentina	2006–2007
Aldosivi	Argentina	2007–2008
Atlético Rafaela	Argentina	2009
San Martín (Tucumán)	Argentina	2009–2010
Boca Unidos	Argentina	2010–2012
Los Andes	Argentina	2012–2013
Chaco For Ever	Argentina	2013–present
