= Cristian Núñez (footballer, born 2000) =

Paraguayan professional footballer

Personal information
- Full name: Cristian David Núñez Vázquez
- Date of birth: 12 August 2000 (age 26)
- Place of birth: Itapé, Paraguay
- Position: Attacking midfielder

Team information
- Current team: San Telmo

Youth career
- 2015–2020: Huracán

Senior career*
Years	Team	Apps	(Gls)
2020–2025	Huracán	15	(0)
2022–2023	→ Tristán Suárez (loan)	21	(2)
2023	→ Deportivo Madryn (loan)	15	(1)
2024	→ Chaco For Ever (loan)	20	(0)
2025–	San Telmo	6	(0)
- * Club domestic league appearances and goals as of 17:37, 20 August 2025 (UTC)

Cristian David Núñez Vázquez (born 12 August 2000) is a Paraguayan professional footballer who plays as an attacking midfielder for San Telmo.

== Career ==
Núñez moved from Paraguay to Argentina in 2015 to join Huracán, though couldn't play matches for their academy for two years due to paperwork issues. Núñez made a breakthrough into first-team football in 2020, with the attacking midfielder making his senior debut on 31 October in a Copa de la Liga Profesional match with Vélez Sarsfield. A day prior, he had signed a new contract lasting until the end of 2023. In June 2022, Núñez was loaned out to Primera Nacional side Tristán Suárez until the end of 2022.

== Personal life ==
Born in Itapé with five brothers, Núñez headed to Villarrica at the age of seven in order to further his footballing career; living with an unrelated man due to his family not having suitable transport to take him to training from his hometown.

== Career statistics ==
As of 1 November 2020.

Appearances and goals by club, season and competition
Club	Season	League			Cup		League Cup		Continental		Other		Total	
Club	Season	Division	Apps	Goals	Apps	Goals	Apps	Goals	Apps	Goals	Apps	Goals	Apps	Goals
Huracán	2020–21 (Note: Soccerway counts Copa de la Liga Profesional appearances as league appearances.)	Primera División	1	0	0	0	0	0	—		0	0	1	0
Career total			1	0	0	0	0	0	—		0	0	1	0
