= Braian Pedraza =

Argentine professional footballer

Personal information
- Full name: Braian Ezequiel Pedraza
- Date of birth: 8 May 1999 (age 27)
- Place of birth: Argentina
- Position: Midfielder

Team information
- Current team: Juventud Unida

Youth career
- Almirante Brown

Senior career*
Years	Team	Apps	(Gls)
2018–2020	Almirante Brown	5	(0)
2021–	Juventud Unida	29	(5)
- * Club domestic league appearances and goals as of 02:17, 25 April 2019 (UTC)

Braian Ezequiel Pedraza (born 8 May 1999) is an Argentine professional footballer who plays as a midfielder for Juventud Unida.

== Career ==
Pedraza's career began with Almirante Brown. He appeared for his debut on 28 November 2018 in a 4–2 victory over Deportivo Español, replacing Diego García after eighty-one minutes. Four further substitute appearances arrived for Pedraza in 2018–19, one in each of the following four months.

In February 2021, Pedraza joined Juventud Unida.

== Career statistics ==
As of 25 April 2019.

Appearances and goals by club, season and competition
Club	Season	League			Cup		League Cup		Continental		Other		Total	
Club	Season	Division	Apps	Goals	Apps	Goals	Apps	Goals	Apps	Goals	Apps	Goals	Apps	Goals
Almirante Brown	2018–19	Primera B Metropolitana	5	0	0	0	—		—		0	0	5	0
Career total			5	0	0	0	—		—		0	0	5	0
