= Braian Ruíz =

Argentine association football player

Personal information
- Full name: Braian Nicolás Ruíz
- Date of birth: 5 February 1998 (age 28)
- Place of birth: Argentina
- Height: 1.86 m (6 ft 1 in)
- Position: Defender

Youth career
- Tigre

Senior career*
Years	Team	Apps	(Gls)
2018–2021	Tigre	0	(0)
2019–2020	→ Fénix (loan)	13	(0)
2022	Real Pilar		
- * Club domestic league appearances and goals as of 19:49, 3 July 2020 (UTC)

Braian Nicolás Ruíz (born 5 February 1998) is an Argentine professional footballer who plays as a defender.

== Career ==
Ruíz started in the system of Tigre. After being an unused substitute for a Primera División fixture in both the 2017–18 and 2018–19 seasons, versus Huracán and Godoy Cruz, Ruíz made his senior bow in the Copa Argentina on 28 February 2019 during a loss to Primera B Metropolitana's Estudiantes at the Estadio Julio Humberto Grondona. Ruíz spent the 2019–20 campaign out on loan in the third tier with Fénix.

== Career statistics ==
As of 3 July 2020.

Appearances and goals by club, season and competition
Club	Season	League			Cup		League Cup		Continental		Other		Total	
Club	Season	Division	Apps	Goals	Apps	Goals	Apps	Goals	Apps	Goals	Apps	Goals	Apps	Goals
Tigre	2017–18	Primera División	0	0	0	0	—		—		0	0	0	0
Tigre	2018–19	Primera División	0	0	1	0	0	0	—		0	0	1	0
Tigre	2019–20	Primera B Nacional	0	0	0	0	—		—		0	0	0	0
Tigre	Total		0	0	1	0	0	0	—		0	0	1	0
Fénix (loan)	2019–20	Primera B Metropolitana	13	0	0	0	—		—		0	0	13	0
Career total			13	0	1	0	0	0	—		0	0	14	0
