= Ignacio Bonadío =

Argentine footballer

Personal information
- Date of birth: 27 July 1993 (age 33)
- Place of birth: Buenos Aires, Argentina
- Height: 1.77 m (5 ft 10 in)
- Position: Defender

Youth career
- Boca Juniors

Senior career*
| Years | Team | Apps | (Gls) |
| 2014–2017 | Tigre | 1 | (0) |
| 2018 | Sud América | 11 | (0) |
- * Club domestic league appearances and goals

Ignacio Bonadío (born 27 July 1993) is an Argentine former footballer.
