= Santiago Villarreal =

Argentine footballer

Personal information
- Full name: Santiago Agustín Villarreal
- Date of birth: 28 February 1996 (age 30)
- Place of birth: Buenos Aires, Argentina
- Height: 1.85 m (6 ft 1 in)
- Position: Defender

Team information
- Current team: Argentino de Merlo

Youth career
- Tigre

Senior career*
Years	Team	Apps	(Gls)
2016–2017	Tigre	1	(0)
2017–2020	Deportivo Armenio	81	(3)
2021	Club Luján	36	(2)
2022–	Argentino de Merlo	8	(1)
- * Club domestic league appearances and goals

Santiago Agustín Villarreal (born 28 February 1996) is an Argentine footballer who plays for Deportivo Armenio.
