= Braian Oyola =

Argentine professional footballer

Personal information
- Full name: Braian Ezequiel Oyola
- Date of birth: 15 June 1996 (age 30)
- Place of birth: Buenos Aires, Argentina
- Height: 1.58 m (5 ft 2 in)
- Positions: Winger; forward

Team information
- Current team: Bolívar

Youth career
- Tigre

Senior career*
Years	Team	Apps	(Gls)
2017–2021	Atlanta	45	(2)
2021–2024	Tristán Suárez	47	(9)
2023	→ Delfín (Loan)	30	(8)
2024–2026	Barcelona S.C.	51	(2)
2026–	Bolívar	0	(0)
- * Club domestic league appearances and goals as of 19 March 2026

Braian Ezequiel Oyola (born 15 June 1996) is an Argentine professional footballer who plays as a winger or forward for Bolivian Primera División club Bolívar.

== Career ==
Oyola, after signing from Tigre in 2017, started his senior career with Atlanta. A 1–0 win over Colegiales on 4 September 2017 allowed Oyola to make his professional debut, in a Primera B Metropolitana fixture that originally ended in a draw before the AFA awarded the points to Atlanta as Colegiales used an ineligible player. He scored his first goal on his twenty-second appearance for the club, netting in a 3–1 victory over Justo José de Urquiza in November 2018.

In February 2021, Oyola joined fellow league club CSyD Tristán Suárez.

== Career statistics ==
As of 29 April 2019.

Appearances and goals by club, season and competition
Club	Season	League			Cup		League Cup		Continental		Other		Total	
Club	Season	Division	Apps	Goals	Apps	Goals	Apps	Goals	Apps	Goals	Apps	Goals	Apps	Goals
Atlanta	2017–18	Primera B Metropolitana	17	0	3	0	—		—		1 (Note: Appearance(s) in the Primera B Metropolitana play-offs)	0	21	0
Atlanta	2018–19	Primera B Metropolitana	13	1	1	0	—		—		0	0	14	1
Career total			30	1	4	0	—		—		1	0	35	1
