= Braian Brandán =

Argentine footballer

Personal information
- Full name: Braian Emanuel Brandán
- Date of birth: 3 November 1998 (age 28)
- Place of birth: Argentina
- Position: Defender

Team information
- Current team: Acassuso

Youth career
- Chacarita Juniors

Senior career*
Years	Team	Apps	(Gls)
2018–	Acassuso	10	(0)
- * Club domestic league appearances and goals as of 12:33, 4 April 2019 (UTC)

Braian Emanuel Brandán (born 3 November 1998) is an Argentine professional footballer who plays as a defender for Acassuso.

== Career ==
Brandán began his career with Chacarita Juniors, which preceded a move to Acassuso. After making his professional bow on 21 August 2018 against Colegiales in Primera B Metropolitana, the defender started the opening eight games of their 2018–19 campaign.

== Career statistics ==
As of 4 April 2019.

Appearances and goals by club, season and competition
Club	Season	League			Cup		Continental		Other		Total	
Club	Season	Division	Apps	Goals	Apps	Goals	Apps	Goals	Apps	Goals	Apps	Goals
Acassuso	2018–19	Primera B Metropolitana	10	0	0	0	—		0	0	10	0
Career total			10	0	0	0	—		0	0	10	0
