= Braian Miranda =

Argentinian footballer (born 1993)

Personal information
- Full name: Braian Ezequiel Miranda
- Date of birth: 19 January 1993 (age 33)
- Place of birth: Tigre, Argentina
- Height: 1.70 m (5 ft 7 in)
- Position: Midfielder

Team information
- Current team: All Boys

Youth career
- Argentinos Juniors

Senior career*
Years	Team	Apps	(Gls)
2013–2014	Argentinos Juniors	0	(0)
2015–2016	Unión San Felipe	34	(5)
2016–2020	Fénix de Pilar	22	(7)
2017–2019	→ Atlanta (loan)	50	(7)
2019–2020	→ Tristán Suárez (loan)	25	(6)
2020–2023	Tristán Suárez	73	(14)
2024	Universidad de Concepción	8	(0)
2025–	All Boys	10	(1)
- * Club domestic league appearances and goals as of 17:14, 2 June 2025 (UTC)

Braian Ezequiel Miranda (born 19 January 1993) is an Argentine professional footballer who plays as a midfielder for All Boys.

== Career ==
Miranda made the breakthrough into senior football with Argentinos Juniors, after manager Ricardo Caruso Lombardi selected him off the bench in a Copa Argentina defeat to Sportivo Belgrano. He made no further appearances for the club, eventually departing in January 2015 to Primera B de Chile outfit Unión San Felipe. His bow came in a 2–0 victory over Everton on 2 February, with his first goal coming on 21 March against the same side. He also scored versus Coquimbo Unido and Concepción in 2014–15, a campaign which he ended with two red cards in three fixtures. He stayed for 2015–16, twenty-five games and two goals came.

On 31 August 2016, Miranda returned to his homeland with Fénix. Seven goals in twenty-two matches followed, which included a brace over UAI Urquiza in December 2016. In the succeeding July, Miranda departed on loan to fellow third tier team Atlanta. He scored five times in his first season, as they reached the promotion play-offs but were eliminated by Tristán Suárez. Miranda would go on to join the latter club on loan in July 2019.

In 2024, he moved to Chile again and joined Universidad de Concepción. He ended his contract in June of the same year.

== Career statistics ==
As of 3 July 2020.

Appearances and goals by club, season and competition
Club	Season	League			Cup		League Cup		Continental		Other		Total	
Club	Season	Division	Apps	Goals	Apps	Goals	Apps	Goals	Apps	Goals	Apps	Goals	Apps	Goals
Argentinos Juniors	2012–13	Primera División	0	0	1	0	—		—		0	0	1	0
Argentinos Juniors	2013–14	Primera División	0	0	0	0	—		—		0	0	0	0
Argentinos Juniors	2014	Primera B Nacional	0	0	0	0	—		—		0	0	0	0
Argentinos Juniors	Total		0	0	1	0	—		—		0	0	1	0
Unión San Felipe	2014–15	Primera B	15	3	0	0	—		—		0	0	15	3
Unión San Felipe	2015–16	Primera B	19	2	6	0	—		—		0	0	25	2
Unión San Felipe	Total		34	5	6	0	—		—		0	0	40	5
Fénix	2016–17	Primera B Metropolitana	22	7	0	0	—		—		0	0	22	7
Fénix	2017–18	Primera B Metropolitana	0	0	0	0	—		—		0	0	0	0
Fénix	2018–19	Primera B Metropolitana	0	0	0	0	—		—		0	0	0	0
Fénix	2019–20	Primera B Metropolitana	0	0	0	0	—		—		0	0	0	0
Fénix	Total		22	7	0	0	—		—		0	0	22	7
Atlanta (loan)	2017–18	Primera B Metropolitana	29	5	3	1	—		—		1 (Note: Appearance(s) in the Primera B Metropolitana play-offs)	0	33	6
Atlanta (loan)	2018–19	Primera B Metropolitana	21	2	0	0	—		—		0	0	21	2
Atlanta (loan)	Total		50	7	3	1	—		—		1	0	54	8
Tristán Suárez (loan)	2019–20	Primera B Metropolitana	21	6	0	0	—		—		0	0	21	6
Career total			127	25	10	1	—		—		1	0	138	26
