= Iván Dubois =

Argentine footballer

Personal information
- Date of birth: 24 April 1995 (age 31)
- Place of birth: Buenos Aires, Argentina
- Height: 1.85 m (6 ft 1 in)
- Position: Centre-back

Youth career
- –2014: Atlanta

Senior career*
Years	Team	Apps	(Gls)
2014	Atlanta	2	(0)
2015–2017	Tigre	0	(0)
2017–2018	Deportivo Español	13	(0)
2018	JJ Urquiza	7	(0)
- * Club domestic league appearances and goals as of 17:51, 4 September 2020 (UTC)

Iván Dubois (born 24 April 1995) is an Argentine professional footballer who plays as a centre-back.

== Career ==
Dubois started his career with Atlanta, he was promoted into their senior squad during the 2014 Primera B Metropolitana campaign and subsequently made two appearances; notably his professional debut versus Deportivo Español on 6 September. Months after the 2014 season concluded, Dubois was signed by Argentine Primera División side Tigre. He remained for 2015, 2016 and 2016–17 but failed to make a first-team appearance. On 30 June 2017, Dubois completed a move to Deportivo Español in Primera B Metropolitana. He subsequently made thirteen appearances in his debut campaign.

Dubois joined Primera B Metropolitana's Justo José de Urquiza in July 2018. Seven appearances followed.

== Career statistics ==
As of 4 September 2020.

Club statistics
Club	Season	League			Cup		League Cup		Continental		Other		Total	
Club	Season	Division	Apps	Goals	Apps	Goals	Apps	Goals	Apps	Goals	Apps	Goals	Apps	Goals
Atlanta	2014	Primera B Metropolitana	2	0	0	0	—		—		0	0	2	0
Tigre	2015	Primera División	0	0	0	0	—		—		0	0	0	0
Tigre	2016	Primera División	0	0	0	0	—		—		0	0	0	0
Tigre	2016–17	Primera División	0	0	0	0	—		—		0	0	0	0
Tigre	Total		0	0	0	0	—		—		0	0	0	0
Deportivo Español	2017–18	Primera B Metropolitana	13	0	0	0	—		—		0	0	13	0
Justo José de Urquiza	2018–19	Primera B Metropolitana	7	0	0	0	—		—		0	0	7	0
Career total			22	0	0	0	—		—		0	0	22	0
