= Estadio José Manuel Moreno =

Football stadium in Merlo, Argentina

Coordinates: 34.680408°S 58.732975°W

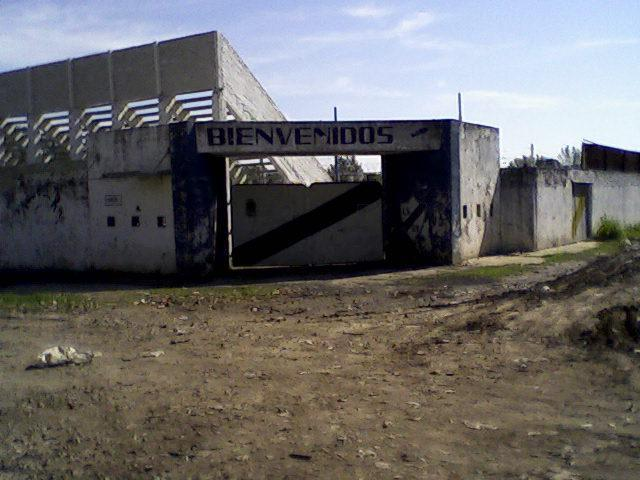
- Interactive map of Estadio José Manuel Moreno
- Location: Merlo Partido, Argentina
- Capacity: 5,000
- Surface: Grass

Construction
- Renovated: N/A
- Closed: Open
- Cost: Unknown

Tenant
- Club Social y Deportivo Merlo

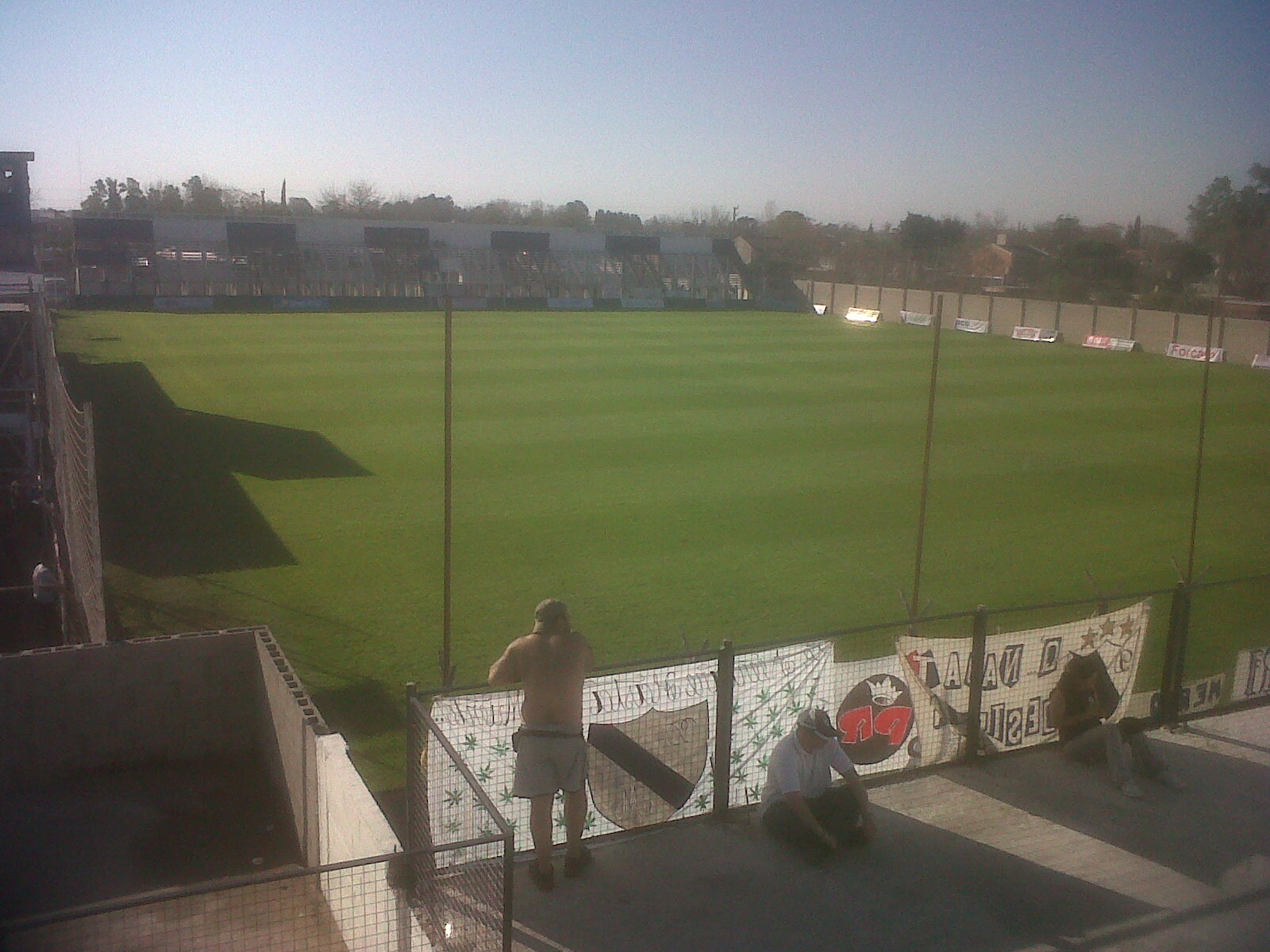
View from the local stand.

Estadio José Manuel Moreno is a multi-purpose stadium in Merlo Partido, Argentina. It is currently used primarily for football matches and hosts the home matches of Primera B Nacional Argentina club, Club Social y Deportivo Merlo. The capacity of the stadium is 5,000 spectators. It is named after former Argentine football player, José Manuel Moreno.
