= Leandro Armani =

Argentine football striker

Personal information
- Full name: Leandro Diego Armani
- Date of birth: December 23, 1983 (age 42)
- Place of birth: Casilda, Argentina
- Height: 1.88 m (6 ft 2 in)
- Position: Striker

Team information
- Current team: Tiro Federal

Senior career*
Years	Team	Apps	(Gls)
2004–2006	Central Córdoba	98	(48)
2006–2007	Independiente Santa Fe	13	(0)
2007–	Tiro Federal	113	(62)
2008–2009	→ Newell's Old Boys (loan)	17	(4)
- * Club domestic league appearances and goals as of 15:57, 11 July 2010 (UTC)

Leandro Diego Armani (born 23 December 1983 in Casilda, Santa Fe) is an Argentine football striker who plays for Tiro Federal in the Torneo Argentino A.

== Career ==
Armani played for Central Córdoba, Independiente Santa Fe, Tiro Federal and Newell's Old Boys during his first professional years. In 2010, after being the top scorer of the Argentine second division during the 2009–10 season with Tiro Federal, the press announced he had joined Godoy Cruz in the Argentine Primera División. However, the transfer did not go through. He played for Tiro Federal in the 2009 through 2014 seasons as well as the 2007/2008 season. He played for Central Cordoba Rosario in the 2013 season and Newell's Old Boys in the 2008/2009 season.
