= Quilmes Atlético Club =

Professional sports club in Argentina

Quilmes
- Full name: Quilmes Atlético Club
- Nicknames: El Cervecero (The Brewers); Decano del fútbol argentino (Argentine football's dean)
- Founded: 27 November 1887; 138 years ago (Note: The club settled on 5 November 1887 as the date of its foundation, considering "Quilmes and Polo Club" (then named "Quilmes Rovers A.C.") as its predecessor. Nevertheless, Argentine football historian Jorge Gallego stated that the original institution founded in 1887 was dissolved and the current club was founded on 5 November 1897 as "Quilmes Cricket Club". According to his version, this club was not related with any other institution previously founded in the city of Quilmes. Other sources affirm that reverend J.T. Stevenson (recognised as founder of "Quilmes C.C.") arrived in Argentina in 1895, taking part in the meeting of 1897 when the QCC was established. Therefore, the date of foundation is still disputed.)
- Ground: Estadio Centenario, Quilmes
- Capacity: 30,200
- Chairman: Carlos Giulianetti
- Manager: Alfredo Grelak
- League: Primera Nacional
- 2025: Primera Nacional Zone A, 15th of 18
- Website: quilmesaclub.org.ar
Home colours	Away colours

Quilmes Atlético Club (Spanish pronunciation: [ˈkilmes aˈtletiko ˈkluβ]) is an Argentine sports club based in the Quilmes district of Greater Buenos Aires. Established in 1887 (although the date of foundation is still under dispute), Quilmes is the oldest club of Argentina still competing in championships organised by the Argentine Football Association. Quilmes' football team currently plays in Primera Nacional, the second division of the Argentine football league system.

In the top division of Argentine football, Quilmes has won three titles, including two Primera División championships and one Copa de Honor MCBA. Quilmes also won five second division titles. The club also has a women's football team, competing at the third division.

Apart from football, Quilmes' main sport is field hockey, which both teams, women's and men's, have won many titles at their respective Torneo Metropolitano championships. Quilmes has also a field hockey stadium, "Estadio Nacional" with a capacity of 6,000 seats.

Other sports practised at the club are basketball, gymnastics, handball, martial arts, roller skating, swimming and tennis.

== History ==
=== Origins and organisation ===
The origins of the club can be found at the "Quilmes and Polo Club", an institution founded by British immigrants about 1880. In 1887 the club changed its name to "Quilmes Rovers Athletic Club" with a football team formed entirely by British people. That team took part in the second edition of Argentine Primera División championship held in 1893.

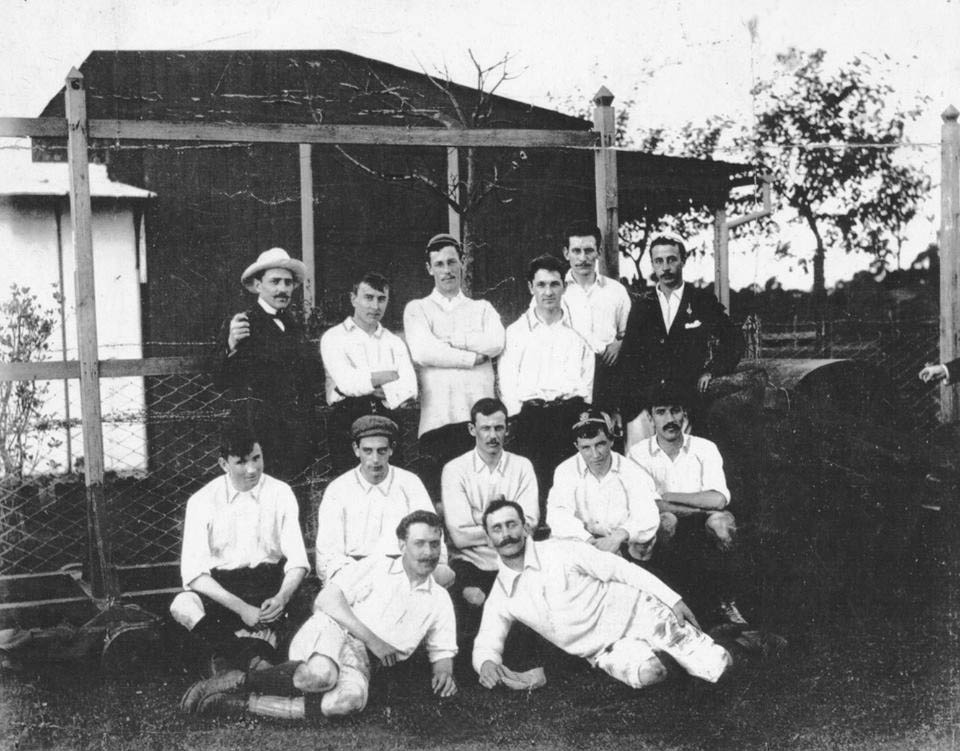
A Quilmes team of 1902, with the white shirt adopted one year before

On 5 November 1897, promoting an initiative by Presbyterian preacher Reverend Joseph T Stevenson, the Quilmes Cricket Club was founded. The club changed its name to Quilmes Athletic Club in 1901, the year that Quilmes registered to Argentine Association Football League (former Argentine Football Association).

By the time that Quilmes was founded, the only club existing in Quilmes was the Quilmes Lawn Tennis Club. Guillermo Morgan was named president, becoming the first chairman of the recently created institution. During its first years, Quilmes did not admitted non-British members. The club represented to the huge British community that worked at Buenos Aires Great Southern Railway. At the beginning of its existence, the main sport practised at Quilmes was cricket, and club's colours were crimson and blue.

In March 1898 Quilmes Cricket Club added football as sport. In 1901 the club also changed its colours, adopting the England national football team's, white shirt with blue collar and shorts. By the first years of 20th century the club began to admit Argentine members, following the example of the other institution of the city, Argentino de Quilmes, which had been founded as a reaction to British rules for memberships. Unlike Quilmes CC, Argentino was opened to receive Argentine members.

=== First title ===
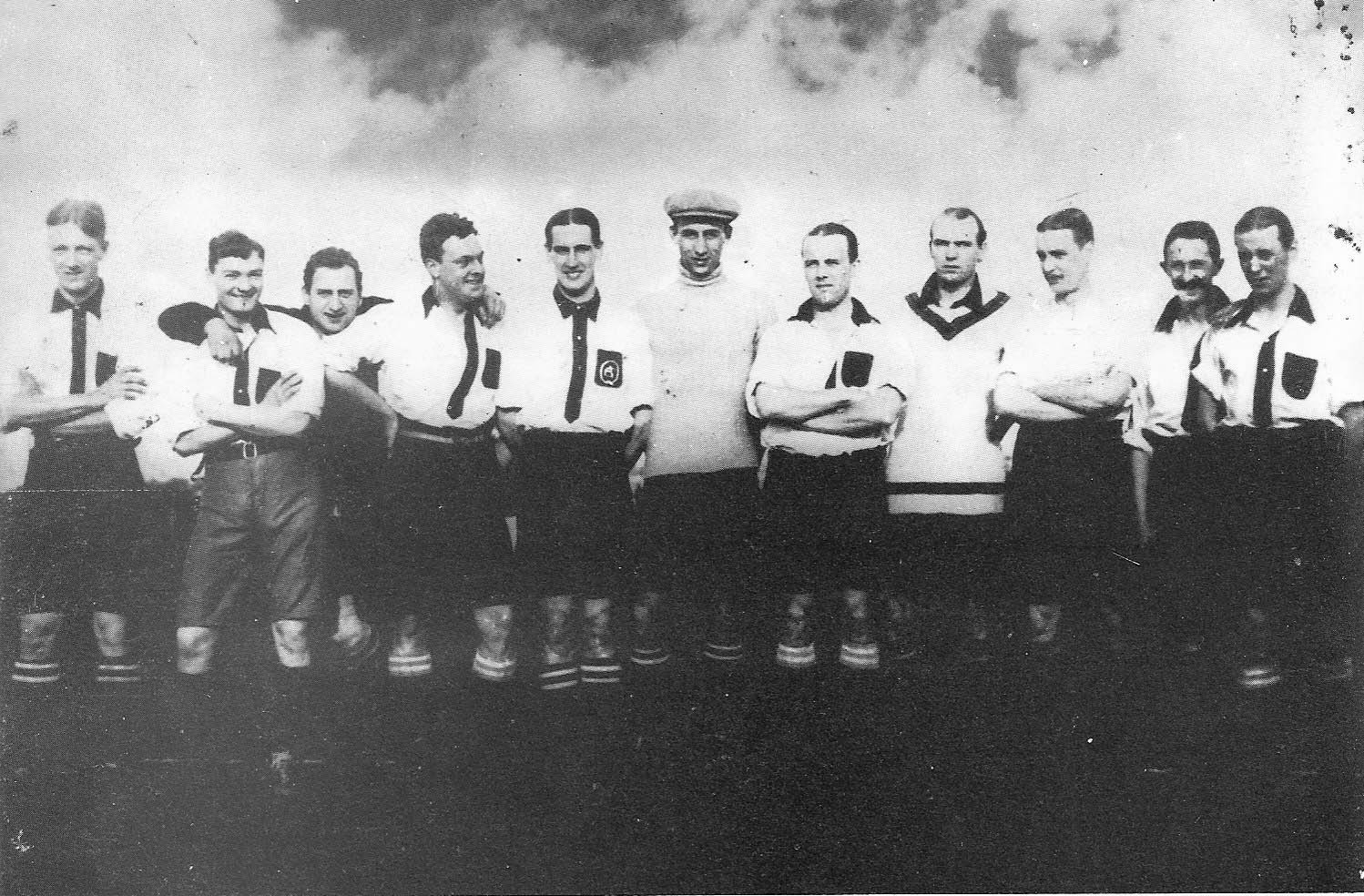
The 1912 team which won the first Primera División championship for the club

Quilmes was the first team (amongst the one that are still active) to face legendary Alumni, in 1901. Alumni beat Quilmes 1–0 and 3–1, keeping its supremacy until 1906 when Quilmes achieved its first victory, defeating Alumni 4–2.

In 1912 Quilmes won its first title, the Primera División championship. The team was formed by many British players that had played for Alumni, dissolved one year before. The team remained in the top division of football until 1937, when it was relegated along with Argentinos Juniors to the second division.

=== Return to success ===
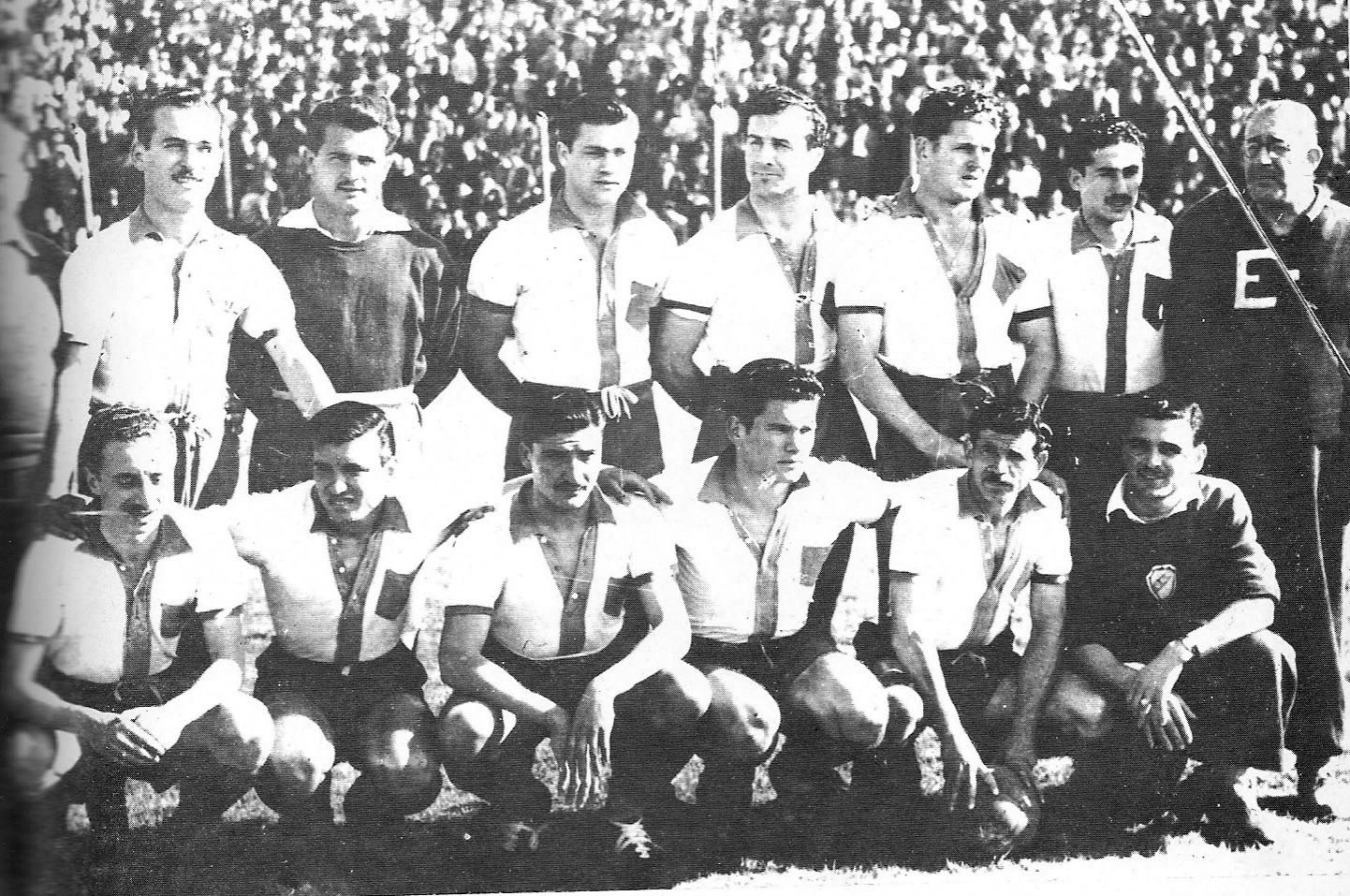
Quilmes AC in 1949, when winning the Primera B title

The team played in Primera B until 1949 when Quilmes won the title promoting to Primera. Quilmes finished the season scored the most goals during the tournament (118). In 1959 the club changed its name again, turning to the Spanish denomination "Quilmes Atlético Club" which has remained since.

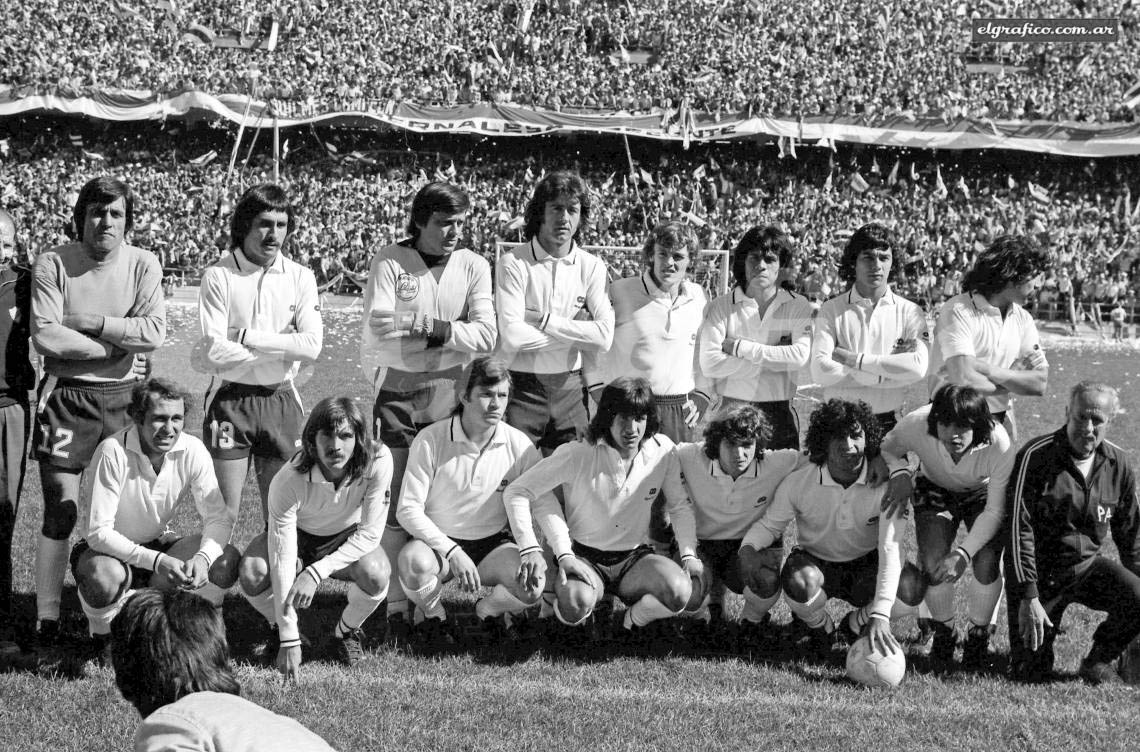
The Quilmes line-up that won the second Primera División title for the club in 1978

After being relegated again in 1951, Quilmes won the second division championship and promoted to Primera, after the Football Association stated that Newell's Old Boys (who had finished first and proclaimed champion) promised Excursionistas an amount of money if they defeated Quilmes. As a result, the title was given to Quilmes (which had finished 2nd after Newell's) which promoted to Primera instead of Rosarino team.

Quilmes lasted only season at the top division, being relegated in 1962 and returning to Primera 3 years later, along with champion Colón de Santa Fe. The club would be relegated again in 1970. Five years later, Quilmes won the Primera B title, promoting along with champion San Telmo.

In 1978 Quilmes won the Torneo Metropolitano, being its only title in Primera to date. That team, coached by José Yudica, had notable players such as Jorge Gáspari, Horacio Milozzi, top-scorer Luis Andreuchi and Omar "El Indio" Gómez, considered the greatest idol in club's history. The next year Quilmes played the 1979 Copa Libertadores but the team did not qualify for the second round being eliminated.

=== The dark years ===
In 1980 Quilmes was relegated to Primera B, returning to Primera just one year later along with champion Nueva Chicago after finishing 2nd. Quilmes made a great performance during the 1981 Nacional reaching the finals where the team was finally beaten by Ferro Carril Oeste. The next season Quilmes could not repeat the good performance and was relegated again to second division. In 1986, due to a major restructuring in the Argentine league system, a new division, "Primera B Nacional" was created. Quilmes did not qualify to play there so the team continued at Primera B, which became the third division after the restructuring.

In 1987 Quilmes won the 1986–87 Primera B Metropolitana title, promoting to National B. That same year construction of the new stadium started. In 1991 Quilmes returned to Primera División after 10 years playing at lower divisions, when beat Club Almirante Brown 1–0. The squad only lasted one season in Primera, returning to Nacional B.

In 1995 Quilmes inaugurated its new stadium, named "Estadio Centenario Dr. José Luis Meiszner" playing a friendly match against Club Nacional de Football. During the following seasons, Quilmes would have many chances to promote but the team did not achieve its objective, losing the final playoffs at the hands of Huracán, Los Andes, and Banfield. Moreover, Quilmes lost another two chances for promotion, being defeated by Belgrano de Córdoba both times.

=== Last years ===
Quilmes finally got the long-awaited promotion to Primera in 2002–03 season, after leaving behind Argentinos Juniors with scores of 1–0 and 0–0.

After two good campaigns in Primera, Quilmes qualified to play the 2005 Copa Libertadores. Quilmes passed the first stage although they were soon eliminated. Quilmes would later be relegated to Nacional B in the 2006–07 season. Quilmes returned to the top division in 2009–10 season along with Olimpo and All Boys. Just one year later Quilmes was again relegated to the second division, where the team remained until 2012.

In June 2012 Quilmes returned to Primera División, after being placed 2nd in Primera B Nacional. The Cervecero defeated Guillermo Brown de Puerto Madryn 2–0 in the last fixture totalising 72 points, therefore promoting after champion River Plate.

Christian Sterli became Quilmes' new president on 25 August 2019, replacing Marcelo Calello.

== Kits ==
The football shirt was primarily red and blue, inspired on the flag of the United Kingdom (due to Quilmes' British origins). In 1901 the club adopted the white and blue colours, until 1908 when the club worn blue shirts. In 1912, Quilmes returned to the white and blue colours, which have remained to the present time.

1887–1901	1901–1908	1908–1911	1912–present

== Nickname ==
Quilmes most known nickname is El Cervecero (The Brewers) because of the Cerveza Quilmes brewery of the same city (which also is the main sponsor of the club). It is also known as El Decano (The Dean), because is the club that has been playing football continuously for the longest time in Argentina.

== Stadium ==
Quilmes started building a new stadium in 1987 to inaugurate it first in 1993, and then officially in 1995. It was extended in 1998 to its current capacity. The old stadium of Guido and Sarmiento junction was later demolished.

== Current squad ==
Note: Flags indicate national team as defined under FIFA eligibility rules; some limited exceptions apply. Players may hold more than one non-FIFA nationality.

No.	Pos.	Nation	Player
—	GK	ARG	Joaquín Canadell
—	GK	SYR	Esteban Glellel
—	GK	ARG	Gonzalo Marinelli
—	DF	ARG	Agustín Bindella
—	DF	ARG	Nicolás Colazo
—	DF	ARG	Ariel Kippes
—	DF	ARG	Joaquín Novillo
—	DF	ARG	Thomas Ortega
—	DF	ARG	Lucas Romeo
—	DF	ARG	Martín Vallejos
—	MF	ARG	Axel Batista

No.	Pos.	Nation	Player
—	MF	ARG	Agustín Bolívar
—	MF	ARG	Ulises Vera
—	MF	ARG	Juan Yangali (on loan from San Telmo)
—	MF	ARG	Ramiro Martínez
—	FW	ARG	Pío Bonacci (on loan from Deportivo Armenio)
—	FW	ARG	Jano Coronel
—	FW	ARG	Mauro Fernández
—	FW	ARG	Agustín Lavezzi
—	FW	ARG	Aaron Spetale
—	FW	ARG	Gabriel Vázquez

== Managers ==
- (Argentina) Humberto Zuccarelli (1 July 1986–30 June 89), (1 July 1992–30 June 95)
- (Argentina) Gustavo Alfaro (1 July 1996–30 June 97)
- (Argentina) Alberto Fanesi (1 July 1997–30 June 99)
- (Argentina) Héctor Rivoira (1 July 2000–30 June 01)
- (Argentina) Gustavo Alfaro (1 July 2003–30 June 04)
- (Argentina) Humberto Zuccarelli (interim) (200?)
- (Argentina) Alberto Pascutti (13 May 2008–12 April 09)
- (Argentina) José María Bianco (24 April 2009–??)
- (Argentina) Jorge Luis Ghiso (1 Jan 2010–30 June 10)
- (Argentina) Hugo Tocalli (10 June 2010–17 Oct 10)
- (Argentina) Leonardo Madelón (17 Oct 2010–6 March 11)
- (Argentina) Ricardo Caruso Lombardi (8 March 2011–4 April 12)
- (Argentina) Omar De Felippe (4 April 2012–30 June 13)
- (Argentina) Nelson Vivas (1 July 2013–21 Oct 13)
- (Argentina) Blas Giunta (22 Oct 2013–16 Feb 14)
- (Argentina) Ricardo Caruso Lombardi (18 Feb 2014–31 May 2014)
- (Argentina) Pablo Quattrocchi (7 June 2014–30 November 2014)

== Honours ==
=== National ===
==== League ====
- Primera División (2): 1912, 1978 Metropolitano
- Primera B Nacional (1): 1990–91
- Primera División B (4): 1949, 1961, 1975, 1986–87

==== National cups ====
- Copa de Honor MCBA (1): 1908

== Field hockey titles ==
=== Women's ===
- Metropolitano Primera División (18): 1925, 1926, 1927, 1928, 1929, 1930, 1931, 1932, 1952, 1954, 1955, 1956, 1957, 1958, 1960, 1961, 1964, 2008

=== Men's ===
- Metropolitano Primera División (16): 1922, 1923, 1924, 1937, 1938, 1939, 1940, 1942, 1944, 1980, 1995, 1996, 2001, 2005, 2007, 2008
