= CSyD Tristán Suárez =

Argentine sports club

Tristán Suárez
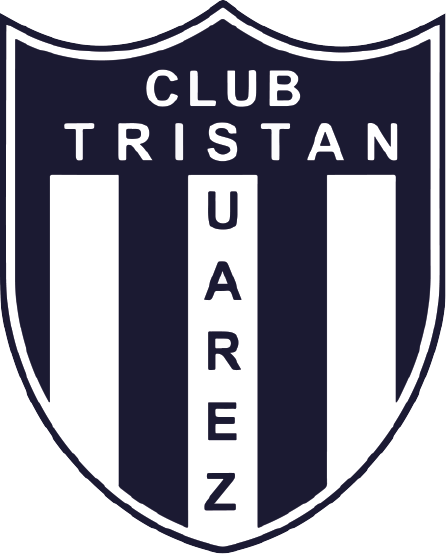
- Full name: Club Tristán Suárez
- Nickname: Lechero
- Founded: 8 August 1929; 97 years ago
- Ground: Estadio 20 de Octubre, Tristán Suárez; Greater Buenos Aires, Argentina
- Capacity: 7,000
- Chairman: Oscar Vergara
- Manager: José María Martínez
- League: Primera Nacional
- 2025: Primera Nacional Zone A, 3rd of 18
- Website: https://clubtsuarez.com.ar/
Home colours	Away colours	Third colours

Club Tristán Suárez (or simply Tristán Suárez) is an Argentine sports club from Tristán Suárez, a city in Greater Buenos Aires. The club is mostly known for its football team, which currently plays in Primera B Nacional, the second division of the Argentine football league system.

Apart from football, other sports practised at the institution are basketball, women's field hockey, roller skating and taekwondo.

== History ==
The club was founded on 8 August 1929 under the name "Sportivo Tristán Suárez", and began to participate in the football tournaments of Esteban Echeverría and Cañuelas cities from 1931 to 1963, when Tristán Suárez affiliated to Argentine Football Association to participate in the Primera D division. Tristán Suárez debuted officially on 2 May 1964, in the Viejo Gasómetro (San Lorenzo de Almagro old venue) being defeated by now disaffiliated Piraña.

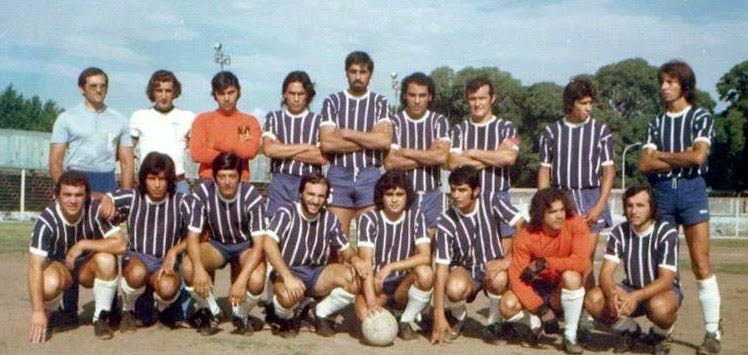
In 1975 Tristán Suárez won the Primera D championship

In 1975 Tristán Suárez won its first title, promoting to Primera C. At the end of that season the team (coached by Horacio Harguindeguy) had finishing sharing the first position with Deportivo Merlo so a match between both teams had to be played in order to proclaim a champion. Tristán Suárez finally beat Deportivo Merlo in a penalty shootout after the regular match ended 1–1.

Tristán Suárez debuted on Primera C in 1976, with a 1–1 draw against Deportivo Armenio. In 1994 the team won its second title, the Torneo Apertura, with goalkeeper Alejandro Otamendi playing 1,115 consecutive minutes without conceding a goal, setting a new record. Tristán Suárez later won the Torneo Reducido after defeating Deportivo Paraguayo, Flandria and Berazategui, therefore the team promoted to the upper division, Primera B Metropolitana.

The team debuted on Primera B Metropolitana beating Sportivo Dock Sud. One year later, the team won the 1996 Apertura defeating Colegiales. The club had to play two matches against Defensa y Justicia (1997 Clausura winner) in order to promote to Primera B Nacional but Tristán Suárez lost the series.

In 2004 Tristán Suárez had another chance to promote to Primera B Nacional, but was defeated at the hands of Unión de Santa Fe

== Players ==
=== Current squad ===
As of 4 August 2022

Note: Flags indicate national team as defined under FIFA eligibility rules; some limited exceptions apply. Players may hold more than one non-FIFA nationality.

No.	Pos.	Nation	Player
—	GK	ARG	Cristian Correa
—	GK	ARG	Ezequiel Bacher
—	DF	ARG	Thomas Ortega (loan from Independiente)
—	DF	ARG	Nahuel Tecilla (loan from Belgrano)
—	DF	ARG	Brian Cucco
—	DF	ARG	Iago Iriarte
—	DF	ARG	Leonel Canzoniero
—	DF	ARG	Lautaro Cardozo
—	DF	ARG	Gabriel Tomasini
—	DF	ARG	Nicolás Pantaleone
—	DF	ARG	Maximiliano Oliva
—	DF	ARG	Mariano Bettini
—	MF	ARG	Ángel Almada
—	MF	ARG	Mateo Comignaghi

No.	Pos.	Nation	Player
—	MF	ARG	Braian Aquino
—	MF	ARG	Maximiliano Brambillo
—	MF	ARG	Franco Quiroga
—	MF	ARG	Enzo Arreguín
—	MF	ARG	Mateo Montenegro (loan from Central Córdoba)
—	MF	ARG	Leonardo Villalba
—	MF	ARG	Braian Miranda
—	MF	ARG	Emanuel Molina
—	FW	PAR	Cristian Núñez (loan from Huracán)
—	FW	ARG	Brian Oyola
—	FW	ARG	Nicolás Messiniti (loan from Independiente)
—	FW	ARG	Fabián Garay
—	FW	ARG	Lautaro Villanueva

== Honours ==
- Primera D (1): 1975
