= Deportivo Merlo =

- Full name: Club Social y Deportivo Merlo
- Nickname: El Charro "El Depo"
- Founded: 10 August 1954; 72 years ago
- Ground: Estadio José Manuel Moreno, Merlo, Buenos Aires, Argentina
- Capacity: 13.000
- Chairman: Guillermo Daniel Gutiérrez
- Manager: Walter Marchesi
- League: Primera B
- 2016: 9°
- Website: http://www.clubdeportivomerlo.com.ar/
Home colours	Away colours	Third colours

Club Social y Deportivo Merlo (usually known simply as Merlo) is an Argentinean football club located in Merlo, Buenos Aires. The team currently plays in Primera B Metropolitana, the third division of the Argentine football league system.

== History ==
The club was founded on 8 October 1954, as "9 de Julio". Two years later the team debuted at Primera D (then named "Aficionados") of Argentine Football Association. In 1968 the name changed to "Deportivo Merlo" which has remained to date. One year later the institution acquired the land where its stadium was built.

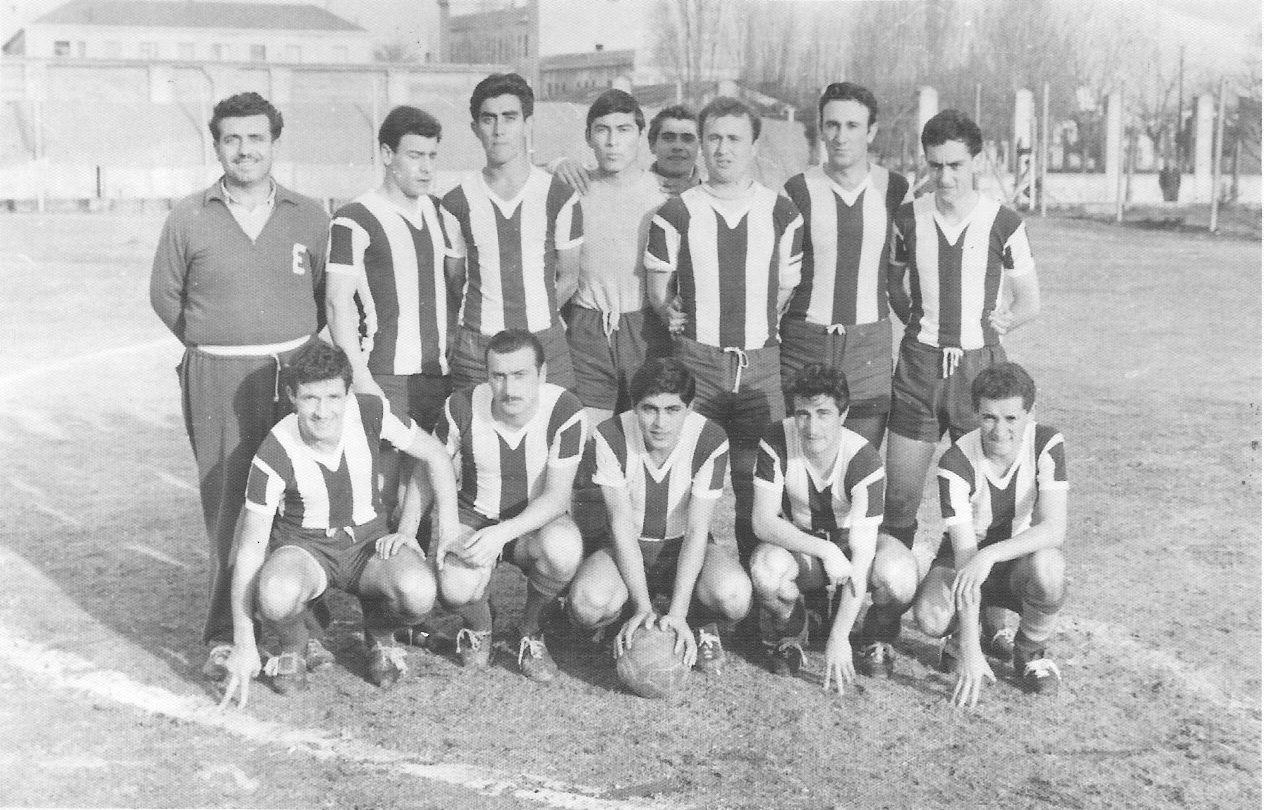
One of the first Deportivo Merlo squads, in the 1950s.

In 1968 the Association announced that clubs without stadium or active members would be disaffiliated. Due to that announcement, a group of young fans of Deportivo Merlo requested the Association a 4-month period of grace to build a stadium and to get new members with the purpose of avoiding the disappearance of the institution.

The Association gave its approval to the request so the club had a meeting with mayor of Merlo Partido, Luis Monetti, asking him for land to build the stadium on. Monetti agreed with the only condition that the team should represent Merlo Partido at the competitions.

Once the negotiations ended, the members joined their efforts in saving money to build the venue, organizing some events with that purpose. One of them was a friendly match vs Vélez Sarsfield that had won the Argentine Primera División championship that same year. The fans also organized dances and asados. In 1969 Deportivo Merlo played its first game at its own stadium recently inaugurated.

In 1977 and 1978 the team was managed by former star José María Moreno, nicknamed "El Charro". Moreno died in August 1978 and the stadium was named in his honour. The nickname Charros also extended to the squad and fans. Popular Looney Tunes animated character Yosemite Sam (which resembled a Mexican charro) was also adopted as the mascot of the team.

In 1975 the team promoted to Primera C after winning a mini-tournament in order to define a second promotion to the upper division. In 1986 Deportivo Merlo promoted to Primera B Metropolitana due to a restructuring of the system.

The team won its first official title in 1999–2000, the Primera C championship although it would be relegated a short time later, returning in 2005–06 when winning a new championship in the same division. In the 2008–09 season the squad promoted to the second division of Argentine football (Primera B Nacional), remaining there up to present. Deportivo Merlo had won the final series against Los Andes (by the same score of 1–0 both games) for which the team got the right to play at the second division.

In 2012 Deportivo Merlo advanced to semi-finals of Copa Argentina where the team was finally eliminated by Boca Juniors. The match had finished tied 1–1, then Boca defeated Merlo by penalty shoot-out with a final score of 5–4.

in June 2013 is relegated to Primera B Metropolitana after losing to the champion Rosario Central 1 a 0 in Rosario.

== Current squad ==
As of 30 July 2015.

Note: Flags indicate national team as defined under FIFA eligibility rules; some limited exceptions apply. Players may hold more than one non-FIFA nationality.

No.	Pos.	Nation	Player
—	GK	ARG	Facundo Ferrero
—	GK	ARG	Rodrigo Llinas
—	DF	ARG	Lucas Blanco
—	DF	ARG	Franco Chivilio
—	DF	ARG	Ernesto Del Castillo
—	DF	ARG	Emiliano Dudar
—	DF	ARG	Carlos Escudero
—	DF	ARG	Gabriel Ferro
—	DF	ARG	Zelmar García
—	DF	ARG	Diego Herrera
—	DF	ARG	Javier Paez
—	DF	ARG	Walter Romero
—	DF	ARG	Matias Rudler
—	DF	ARG	Agustin Strano
—	DF	ARG	Alvaro Ybarra
—	MF	ARG	Lautaro Baeza

No.	Pos.	Nation	Player
—	MF	BOL	Simon Bastos
—	MF	ARG	Carlos Bataras
—	MF	ARG	Rodrigo Freites
—	MF	ARG	Cristian Gironi
—	MF	ARG	Brian Martin
—	MF	ARG	Pablo Rodriguez
—	MF	ARG	Carlos Silva
—	MF	ARG	Nicolas Vara
—	MF	ARG	Jorgue Varela
—	MF	ARG	Marcos Zampini
—	FW	ARG	Fernando Cobian
—	FW	ARG	Gustavo Miño
—	FW	ARG	Nahuel Ramirez
—	FW	ARG	Leandro Rodríguez
—	FW	ARG	Federico Turienzo

== Honours ==
- Primera C
  - Champions (2): 1999–00, 2005–06
