= 2021 Primera Nacional =

37th season of the second-tier football league in Argentina

Primera Nacional
- Season: 2021
- Dates: 12 March – 21 December 2021
- Champions: Tigre (1st title)
- Promoted: Tigre; Barracas Central
- Relegated: None
- Matches: 590
- Goals: 1,219 (2.07 per match)
- Top goalscorer: Pablo Magnín (22 goals)
- Biggest home win: Ferro Carril Oeste 6–0 Indep. Rivadavia (10 September); Ferro Carril Oeste 6–0 San Telmo (26 October)
- Biggest away win: Def. de Belgrano 1–6 Tristán Suárez (10 July)
- Highest scoring: Indep. Rivadavia 4–3 San Telmo (22 March); Quilmes 3–4 Alvarado (10 May); Def. de Belgrano 1–6 Tristán Suárez (10 July)

The 2021 Argentine Primera Nacional, also known as the Campeonato de Primera Nacional 2021, was the 37th season of the Primera Nacional, the second tier of Argentine football. The season began on 12 March 2021 and ended on 21 December 2021. Thirty-five teams competed in the league, thirty returning from the 2020 season, two teams promoted from Torneo Federal A and three from Primera B Metropolitana.

Tigre were the champions, winning their first Primera Nacional title by beating Barracas Central by a 1–0 score in the final played on 22 November 2021 and earned promotion to the Argentine Primera División.

== Format ==
The 35 teams were split into two zones, one of 17 teams and another one of 18 teams, where they played against the other teams in their group twice: once at home and once away, with one team in Zone A having a bye in each round for a total of 34 rounds. Both zone winners played a final match on neutral ground to decide the first promoted team to the Liga Profesional for the 2022 season, while the teams placed from second to fourth place in each zone played a knockout tournament (Torneo Reducido) for the second promotion berth along with the loser of the final between the zone winners, which joined the Reducido in the semi-finals. No teams were relegated to either Primera B Metropolitana or Torneo Federal A this season. The draw to decide the groups and fixture was held on 25 February 2021.

== Club information ==
=== Stadia and locations ===
Locations of the 2021 Primera Nacional teams outside Greater Buenos Aires.
Locations of the 2021 Primera Nacional teams within Greater Buenos Aires.

Club	City	Stadium
Agropecuario Argentino	Carlos Casares	Ofelia Rosenzuaig
All Boys	Buenos Aires	Islas Malvinas
Almagro	José Ingenieros	Tres de Febrero
Almirante Brown	Isidro Casanova	Fragata Presidente Sarmiento
Alvarado	Mar del Plata	José María Minella
Atlanta	Buenos Aires	Don León Kolbowsky
Atlético de Rafaela	Rafaela	Nuevo Monumental
Belgrano	Córdoba	Julio César Villagra
Barracas Central	Buenos Aires	Claudio Chiqui Tapia
Brown (A)	Adrogué	Lorenzo Arandilla
Chacarita Juniors	Villa Maipú	Chacarita Juniors
Defensores de Belgrano	Buenos Aires	Juan Pasquale
Deportivo Maipú	Maipú	Omar Higinio Sperdutti
Deportivo Morón	Morón	Nuevo Francisco Urbano
Deportivo Riestra	Buenos Aires	Guillermo Laza
Estudiantes (BA)	Caseros	Ciudad de Caseros
Estudiantes (RC)	Río Cuarto	Antonio Candini
Ferro Carril Oeste	Buenos Aires	Arquitecto Ricardo Etcheverry
Gimnasia y Esgrima (J)	Jujuy	23 de Agosto
Gimnasia y Esgrima (M)	Mendoza	Víctor Legrotaglie
Güemes	Santiago del Estero	Arturo Miranda
Guillermo Brown	Puerto Madryn	Raúl Conti
Independiente Rivadavia	Mendoza	Bautista Gargantini
Instituto	Córdoba	Presidente Perón
Mitre (SdE)	Santiago del Estero	Doctores José y Antonio Castiglione
Nueva Chicago	Buenos Aires	Nueva Chicago
Quilmes	Quilmes	Centenario
San Martín (SJ)	San Juan	Ingeniero Hilario Sánchez
San Martín (SJ)	San Juan	Estadio del Bicentenario
San Martín (T)	Tucumán	La Ciudadela
San Telmo	Dock Sud	Osvaldo Baletto
Santamarina	Tandil	Municipal Gral. San Martín
Temperley	Temperley	Alfredo Beranger
Tigre	Victoria	José Dellagiovanna
Tristán Suárez	Tristán Suárez	20 de Octubre
Villa Dálmine	Campana	El Coliseo de Mitre y Puccini

== Zone A ==
=== Standings ===
Pos	Team	Pld	W	D	L	GF	GA	GD	Pts	Qualification
1	Tigre	32	17	9	6	50	25	+25	60	Advance to Final and qualification for Copa Argentina
2	Quilmes	32	17	8	7	45	31	+14	59	Advance to Torneo Reducido and qualification for Copa Argentina
3	Almirante Brown	32	17	8	7	40	32	+8	59	Advance to Torneo Reducido and qualification for Copa Argentina
4	San Martín (T)	32	15	12	5	34	18	+16	57	Advance to Torneo Reducido and qualification for Copa Argentina
5	Agropecuario Argentino	32	15	8	9	36	26	+10	53	Qualification for Copa Argentina
6	Belgrano	32	15	7	10	35	24	+11	52	Qualification for Copa Argentina
7	Gimnasia y Esgrima (M)	32	11	11	10	34	35	−1	44	Qualification for Copa Argentina
8	Alvarado	32	12	6	14	32	30	+2	42	
9	Temperley	32	10	11	11	29	34	−5	41	
10	Atlanta	32	9	12	11	27	34	−7	39	
11	Estudiantes (BA)	32	8	14	10	29	28	+1	38	
12	Mitre (SdE)	32	9	10	13	37	44	−7	37	
13	Deportivo Maipú	32	10	6	16	27	38	−11	36	
14	Estudiantes (RC)	32	5	19	8	23	26	−3	34	
15	Deportivo Riestra	32	9	7	16	30	36	−6	34	
16	Chacarita Juniors	32	6	9	17	29	50	−21	27	
17	Nueva Chicago	32	4	9	19	23	49	−26	21	

Source: AFA
Rules for classification: 1) points; 2) play-off (only for deciding promotion or relegation); 3) goal difference; 4) goals scored; 5) head-to-head points; 6) head-to-head goal difference; 7) head-to-head goals scored.

=== Results ===
Home \ Away	AGA	CAB	ALV	ATL	BEL	CHA	DMA	DRI	EBA	ERC	GEM	MIT	NCH	QUI	SMT	TEM	TIG
Agropecuario Argentino	—	3–1	1–0	1–0	1–2	1–0	1–1	0–1	0–0	1–1	2–0	1–0	3–0	3–1	0–1	1–0	0–0
Almirante Brown	2–1	—	3–2	0–1	1–0	2–1	1–0	1–0	2–1	1–1	0–2	0–0	1–0	0–0	0–0	3–2	1–0
Alvarado	2–0	0–1	—	1–0	0–1	2–1	1–0	2–1	0–1	0–0	1–2	3–1	4–0	0–1	2–0	1–0	1–1
Atlanta	0–3	0–1	0–0	—	1–0	0–3	0–0	2–2	1–0	1–0	1–1	0–0	0–0	0–0	2–1	1–1	0–0
Belgrano	0–1	0–1	3–0	2–2	—	3–0	1–0	1–0	1–0	1–1	0–1	2–1	0–0	0–1	0–1	2–1	2–1
Chacarita Juniors	2–2	2–1	0–2	0–1	2–0	—	1–2	0–0	0–0	0–0	0–4	1–3	2–3	1–3	1–3	1–2	2–2
Deportivo Maipú	2–0	0–1	1–0	3–2	1–2	1–2	—	3–1	0–0	1–0	0–2	1–1	0–2	2–1	0–2	0–1	0–4
Deportivo Riestra	1–2	1–2	1–0	3–1	1–1	4–0	0–1	—	1–0	0–1	0–0	2–0	2–0	0–1	0–0	0–0	1–3
Estudiantes (BA)	1–1	1–2	1–3	2–1	0–0	1–0	2–1	2–1	—	0–0	0–0	5–0	1–1	0–0	1–1	0–0	2–1
Estudiantes (RC)	1–1	0–0	2–0	1–2	0–1	1–1	1–1	2–0	1–1	—	1–1	2–1	1–1	0–2	0–0	1–3	0–0
Gimnasia y Esgrima (M)	2–0	3–3	2–0	1–2	0–3	1–1	1–1	1–1	3–1	0–0	—	0–0	0–1	0–3	0–0	1–2	0–4
Mitre (SdE)	1–2	3–2	1–0	1–1	1–0	1–2	3–1	0–2	0–2	1–1	1–2	—	1–0	4–0	0–0	1–1	4–2
Nueva Chicago	1–2	0–3	1–1	1–0	0–2	1–1	1–2	2–3	0–0	1–2	1–2	1–2	—	1–1	0–1	0–0	2–4
Quilmes	0–0	3–1	3–4	2–1	2–3	3–1	1–0	2–1	2–1	0–0	0–1	2–1	3–1	—	0–0	2–0	2–1
San Martín (T)	1–0	2–2	0–0	3–0	0–0	0–1	2–0	2–0	0–0	2–1	3–1	1–1	3–1	1–2	—	2–1	0–2
Temperley	0–2	0–0	0–0	0–3	3–2	0–0	0–2	1–0	3–2	1–1	1–0	2–0	1–0	2–2	0–1	—	0–2
Tigre	2–0	3–1	1–0	1–1	0–0	1–0	1–0	3–0	2–1	1–0	2–0	3–3	1–0	1–0	0–1	1–1	—

Source: AFA
Legend: Blue = home team win; Yellow = draw; Red = away team win.

== Zone B ==
=== Standings ===
Pos	Team	Pld	W	D	L	GF	GA	GD	Pts	Qualification
1	Barracas Central	34	15	13	6	43	33	+10	58	Advance to Final and qualification for Copa Argentina
2	Ferro Carril Oeste	34	15	12	7	49	28	+21	57	Advance to Torneo Reducido and qualification for Copa Argentina
3	Independiente Rivadavia	34	14	14	6	47	39	+8	56	Advance to Torneo Reducido and qualification for Copa Argentina
4	Deportivo Morón	34	16	5	13	36	34	+2	53	Advance to Torneo Reducido and qualification for Copa Argentina
5	Güemes	34	13	13	8	38	31	+7	52	Qualification for Copa Argentina
6	Gimnasia y Esgrima (J)	34	13	13	8	34	30	+4	52	Qualification for Copa Argentina
7	Brown (A)	34	12	11	11	41	40	+1	47	Qualification for Copa Argentina
8	Tristán Suárez	34	11	12	11	43	42	+1	45	Qualification for Copa Argentina
9	Almagro	34	11	10	13	41	40	+1	43	
10	Defensores de Belgrano	34	9	15	10	27	32	−5	42	
11	Instituto	34	8	16	10	33	39	−6	40	
12	All Boys	34	9	12	13	32	32	0	39	
13	San Martín (SJ)	34	9	11	14	37	39	−2	38	
14	Villa Dálmine	34	7	17	10	25	30	−5	38	
15	Atlético de Rafaela	34	9	10	15	34	37	−3	37	
16	Guillermo Brown	34	7	16	11	25	32	−7	37	
17	San Telmo	34	8	13	13	34	50	−16	37	
18	Santamarina	34	6	15	13	23	34	−11	33	

Source: AFA
Rules for classification: 1) points; 2) play-off (only for deciding promotion or relegation); 3) goal difference; 4) goals scored; 5) head-to-head points; 6) head-to-head goal difference; 7) head-to-head goals scored.

=== Results ===
Home \ Away	ALL	ALM	ATR	BAC	BRO	DBE	DMO	FCO	GEJ	GÜE	GBR	IND	INS	SMA	STE	SAN	TRS	VDA
All Boys	—	1–1	0–1	0–0	1–1	2–0	1–3	3–0	1–0	1–2	3–0	1–1	1–2	0–1	3–0	0–0	2–0	0–0
Almagro	3–0	—	1–0	0–1	5–0	2–0	2–1	2–3	2–2	0–0	2–2	0–2	2–1	0–1	1–0	1–1	1–3	1–2
Atlético de Rafaela	2–0	4–1	—	0–2	2–0	0–0	3–1	1–1	2–0	1–1	0–1	2–1	0–1	0–2	2–2	0–1	2–2	0–0
Barracas Central	2–1	2–1	2–1	—	1–1	1–1	1–0	0–0	1–1	1–0	0–0	1–3	1–1	3–0	3–2	2–2	3–1	1–0
Brown (A)	1–1	2–0	2–1	1–2	—	0–3	0–1	1–3	1–1	1–3	1–0	1–1	2–0	1–0	2–2	2–0	2–1	2–0
Defensores de Belgrano	0–0	1–0	2–0	0–0	0–3	—	0–2	0–2	0–1	1–0	2–0	1–2	0–0	1–1	0–0	0–0	1–6	2–0
Deportivo Morón	3–0	1–0	0–0	2–0	0–2	3–0	—	1–0	2–0	0–2	0–0	2–2	2–2	1–0	2–0	2–1	1–0	0–2
Ferro Carril Oeste	0–0	1–2	1–0	2–1	1–0	1–1	2–0	—	0–0	1–1	0–0	6–0	3–1	3–2	6–0	2–0	2–0	0–0
Gimnasia y Esgrima (J)	1–0	1–2	1–0	2–1	0–0	1–3	2–0	0–0	—	1–1	3–1	1–1	2–0	1–0	2–1	1–0	2–0	1–0
Güemes	1–0	0–2	0–2	3–0	1–1	2–2	1–2	2–0	1–0	—	0–3	0–2	1–1	1–0	1–1	3–0	0–0	0–0
Guillermo Brown	1–0	1–0	1–1	0–1	0–3	1–1	0–1	3–1	0–0	1–2	—	0–2	1–1	0–0	1–2	0–0	0–0	1–1
Independiente Rivadavia	2–2	1–1	3–2	0–0	2–1	1–1	2–0	1–2	1–1	0–0	0–2	—	2–1	1–1	4–3	3–1	1–2	1–1
Instituto	1–2	1–1	2–1	1–0	2–2	0–2	2–1	2–2	1–2	0–0	1–1	0–0	—	1–1	1–0	0–0	1–2	1–1
San Martín (SJ)	0–2	1–1	4–2	2–3	1–2	1–0	1–1	1–1	2–2	1–2	0–0	0–1	1–0	—	5–0	0–2	4–0	1–0
San Telmo	1–1	2–1	0–0	1–1	2–1	0–0	0–1	1–0	0–0	1–1	1–2	1–0	0–1	2–1	—	2–2	0–1	1–0
Santamarina	2–0	1–1	0–0	1–1	0–0	0–2	2–0	0–2	2–1	1–2	1–1	0–1	0–0	0–0	0–2	—	0–0	2–0
Tristán Suárez	0–2	1–1	1–2	2–2	2–2	0–0	2–0	1–0	2–0	1–2	1–0	1–2	2–2	4–1	1–1	2–1	—	1–1
Villa Dálmine	0–0	0–1	1–0	1–3	1–0	0–0	2–0	1–1	1–1	2–1	1–1	0–0	1–2	1–1	3–3	1–0	1–1	—

Source: AFA
Legend: Blue = home team win; Yellow = draw; Red = away team win.

== Final ==
The top-ranked teams of each zone played a match on neutral ground to decide the champions and the first team promoted to Primera División. The losing team advanced to the semi-finals of the Torneo Reducido.

22 November 2021
21:10

Tigre	1–0	Barracas Central
Zabala 42'	Report

Estadio Florencio Sola, Banfield
Referee: Patricio Loustau

Team details

Tigre	Barracas Central

GK	1	(Argentina) Gonzalo Marinelli
DF	4	(Argentina) Víctor Cabrera
DF	2	(Argentina) Fernando Alarcón
DF	6	(Argentina) Abel Luciatti
MF	11	(Argentina) Cristian Zabala	(substituted off) 75'
MF	8	(Argentina) Lucas Blondel
MF	5	(Argentina) Sebastián Prediger (c)	(yellow card) 80'
MF	10	(Argentina) Lucas Menossi	(substituted off) 85'
MF	3	(Argentina) Sebastián Prieto
FW	7	(Argentina) Pablo Magnín	(yellow card) 30'
FW	9	(Argentina) Ijiel Protti	(substituted off) 90'
Substitutes:
GK	12	(Argentina) Manuel Roffo
DF	13	(Argentina) Francisco Oliver
MF	14	(Argentina) Agustín Cardozo	(substituted in) 75'
DF	15	(Argentina) Diego Sosa	(substituted in) 85'
MF	16	(Argentina) Francisco Metilli
FW	17	(Argentina) Gonzalo Flores
FW	18	(Argentina) Milton Céliz	(substituted in) 90'
DF	19	(Argentina) Martín Galmarini
FW	20	(Argentina) Tomás Fernández
Manager:
(Argentina) Diego Martínez

GK	1	(Argentina) Maximiliano Gagliardo
DF	4	(Argentina) Dylan Glaby	(yellow card) 80'
DF	2	(Argentina) Bruno Cabrera	(yellow card) 83'	(substituted off) 84'
DF	6	(Argentina) Fernando González
DF	3	(Argentina) Gonzalo Paz
MF	8	(Argentina) Juan Manuel Vázquez	(substituted off) 60'
MF	5	(Argentina) Carlos Arce	(yellow card) 23'	(substituted off) 84'
MF	10	(Argentina) Iván Tapia
FW	11	(Argentina) Lucas Colitto
FW	7	(Argentina) Fernando Valenzuela
FW	9	(Argentina) Leonel Buter	(substituted off) 45'
Substitutes:
GK	12	(Argentina) Mariano Monllor
DF	13	(Argentina) Andrés Imperiale
MF	14	(Argentina) Jonathan Rivero
DF	15	(Argentina) Daniel Martínez
FW	16	(Argentina) Facundo Stable	(substituted in) 60'
FW	17	(Argentina) Valentín Viola	(substituted in) 84'
FW	18	(Argentina) Mauro Albertengo	(substituted in) 84'
FW	19	(Argentina) Germán Estigarribia	(substituted in) 45'
MF	20	(Argentina) Luciano Romero
Manager:
(Argentina) Rodolfo de Paoli

== Torneo Reducido ==
=== First round ===
Team 1	Agg.	Team 2	1st leg	2nd leg
Deportivo Morón	3–3 (4–5 p)	Quilmes	2–2	1–1
San Martín (T)	2–3	Ferro Carril Oeste	1–3	1–0
Independiente Rivadavia	1–2	Almirante Brown	1–1	0–1

==== First leg ====
21 November 2021	Deportivo Morón	2–2	Quilmes	Morón
19:15	González 36' (pen.); Levato 55'	Report	Pons 17' (pen.); Silva 71'	Stadium: Nuevo Francisco Urbano; Referee: Darío Herrera

22 November 2021	Independiente Rivadavia	1–1	Almirante Brown	Mendoza
17:00	Mayorga 73'	Report	Batallini 79'	Stadium: Bautista Gargantini; Referee: Yael Falcón Pérez

22 November 2021	San Martín (T)	1–3	Ferro Carril Oeste	Tucumán
19:05	Diarte 44'	Report	Molina 17'; Fernández 42'; Mosca 84'	Stadium: La Ciudadela; Referee: Mauro Vigliano

==== Second leg ====
27 November 2021	Quilmes	1–1 (3–3 agg.) (5–4 p)	Deportivo Morón	Quilmes
19:10	Moreno 17'	Report	Villalba 24'	Stadium: Centenario Ciudad de Quilmes; Referee: Ariel Penel
	Penalties
	Anselmo (penalty scored); Ortega (penalty scored); García Basso (penalty scored); Obregón (penalty scored); R. Barrios (penalty scored)		(penalty scored) González; (penalty missed) Bontempo; (penalty scored) Schönfeld; (penalty scored) Guaycochea; (penalty scored) Abascia

29 November 2021	Almirante Brown	1–0 (2–1 agg.)	Independiente Rivadavia	Isidro Casanova
17:00	García 44' (pen.)	Report		Stadium: Fragata Presidente Sarmiento; Referee: Jorge Baliño
Note: Match originally scheduled for 28 November 2021, 20:00 local time but suspended and rescheduled for 29 November 2021, 17:00 local time due to a failure in the stadium's lighting system.

29 November 2021	Ferro Carril Oeste	0–1 (3–2 agg.)	San Martín (T)	Buenos Aires
21:10		Report	Aleo 60' (o.g.)	Stadium: Arquitecto Ricardo Etcheverry; Referee: Yael Falcón Pérez

=== Semi-finals ===
The semi-finals were contested by the three winners from the previous stage, as well as the Final losers Barracas Central. In this round, the four teams were seeded according to their performance in the first stage of the competition, with the best-ranked teams being paired against the worst ranked ones in double-legged ties. The two winners advanced to the final.

Team 1	Agg.	Team 2	1st leg	2nd leg
Almirante Brown	2–3	Barracas Central	0–0	2–3
Ferro Carril Oeste	1–2	Quilmes	1–1	0–1

==== First leg ====
6 December 2021	Almirante Brown	0–0	Barracas Central	Isidro Casanova
17:00		Report		Stadium: Fragata Presidente Sarmiento; Referee: Leandro Rey Hilfer

6 December 2021	Ferro Carril Oeste	1–1	Quilmes	Buenos Aires
21:10	Grana 46'	Report	Pavone 53'	Stadium: Arquitecto Ricardo Etcheverry; Referee: Pablo Echavarría

==== Second leg ====
13 December 2021	Barracas Central	3–2 (3–2 agg.)	Almirante Brown	Buenos Aires
17:10	Paz 26', 30'; Colitto 42'	Report	Chimeli 78'; Guzmán 82'	Stadium: Claudio Chiqui Tapia; Referee: Andrés Merlos

13 December 2021	Quilmes	1–0 (2–1 agg.)	Ferro Carril Oeste	Quilmes
21:10	Anselmo 76' (pen.)	Report		Stadium: Centenario Ciudad de Quilmes; Referee: Nicolás Lamolina

=== Final ===
The semi-final winners played a match on neutral ground to decide the second team promoted to Primera División.

2021 Torneo Reducido Final
21 December 2021
20:10

Barracas Central	0–0	Quilmes
	Report
Penalties
Tapia (penalty scored); Colitto (penalty scored); Estigarribia (penalty scored); Paz (penalty scored); Valenzuela (penalty scored)	5–4	(penalty scored) Anselmo; (penalty scored) Ortega; (penalty scored) García Basso; (penalty scored) Moreno; (penalty missed) R. Barrios

Estadio Presidente Juan Domingo Perón, Avellaneda
Referee: Darío Herrera

Team details

Quilmes
Barracas Central

GK	1	(Argentina) Rodrigo Saracho
DF	4	(Argentina) Rafael Barrios
DF	2	(Argentina) Pier Barrios
DF	6	(Argentina) Agustín García Basso
DF	3	(Argentina) Agustín Bindella
MF	7	(Argentina) Julián Bonetto		Substituted off
MF	5	(Argentina) Adrián Calello (c)	Booked	Substituted off
MF	8	(Argentina) Facundo Silva	Booked	Substituted off
MF	11	(Colombia) Camilo Machado	Booked
FW	9	(Argentina) Mariano Pavone		Substituted off
FW	10	(Argentina) Facundo Pons		Substituted off
Substitutes:
DF	14	(Argentina) Martín Ortega		Substituted in
MF	15	(Argentina) Tomás Bottari		Substituted in
MF	17	(Argentina) Emanuel Moreno		Substituted in
FW	19	(Argentina) Federico Anselmo		Substituted in
FW	20	(Argentina) Tomás Blanco		Substituted in
Manager:
(Argentina) Facundo Sava

GK	1	(Argentina) Maximiliano Gagliardo
DF	4	(Argentina) Axel Bordón
DF	2	(Argentina) Bruno Cabrera	Booked	Substituted off
DF	6	(Argentina) Fernando González	Booked
DF	3	(Argentina) Gonzalo Paz
MF	7	(Argentina) Lucas Colitto
MF	8	(Argentina) Dylan Glaby
MF	5	(Argentina) Carlos Arce
MF	11	(Argentina) Juan Manuel Vázquez		Substituted off
MF	10	(Argentina) Iván Tapia (c)
FW	9	(Argentina) Mauro Albertengo		Substituted off
Substitutes:
FW	17	(Argentina) Carlos Valenzuela		Substituted in
FW	18	(Argentina) Germán Estigarribia		Substituted in
FW	19	(Argentina) Leonel Buter		Substituted in Booked
Manager:
(Argentina) Rodolfo De Paoli

== Copa Argentina qualification ==
Fifteen Primera Nacional teams qualified for the round of 32 of the 2021–22 Copa Argentina, which were the top seven teams of each zone at the end of the season and the best eighth-placed team, which was selected according to points earned per game, goal difference, and goals scored.

=== Ranking of eighth-placed teams ===
Pos	Grp	Team	Pld	W	D	L	GF	GA	GD	Pts	PPG	Qualification
1	B	Tristán Suárez	34	11	12	11	43	42	+1	45	1.32	Qualification for Copa Argentina
2	A	Alvarado	32	12	6	14	32	30	+2	42	1.31	

Source: AFA
Rules for classification: 1) Points per game; 2) Goal difference; 3) Goals scored; 4) Drawing of lots.

== Season statistics ==
=== Top scorers ===
Rank	Player	Club	Goals
1	(Argentina) Pablo Magnín	Tigre	22
2	(Argentina) Pablo Vegetti	Belgrano	17
3	(Argentina) Facundo Bruera	Brown	15
4	(Argentina) Brian Fernández	Ferro Carril Oeste	14
5	(Argentina) Nicolás Servetto	Almagro	13
5	(Argentina) Claudio Bieler	Atlético de Rafaela	13
7	(Argentina) Facundo Suárez	Gimnasia y Esgrima (J)	12
8	(Argentina) Axel Rodríguez	All Boys	11
8	(Argentina) Felipe Cadenazzi	Alvarado	11
10	(Argentina) Santiago Vera	Almirante Brown	10
10	(Argentina) Ignacio Colombini	Atlanta	10
10	(Argentina) Tomás Molina	Ferro Carril Oeste	10
10	(Argentina) Diego Cardozo	Independiente Rivadavia	10
10	(Argentina) Ezequiel Cérica	Mitre (SdE)	10

== See also ==
- 2021 Argentine Primera División
- 2021 Torneo Federal A
- 2019–20 Copa Argentina
