= 2022 Liga Deportiva Universitaria de Quito season =

L.D.U. Quito
2022 season
- President: Guillermo Romero
- Manager: Luis Zubeldía
- Stadium: Estadio Rodrigo Paz Delgado
- LigaPro: 4th
- Conmebol Sudamericana: Group stage
- Copa Ecuador: Round of 16
- Top goalscorer: League: Tomás Molina (13 goals); All: Alexander Alvarado; Tomás Molina (14 goals)
Home colours	Away colours	Third colours

Liga Deportiva Universitaria de Quito's 2022 season was the club's 92nd year of existence, the 69th year in professional football, and the 61st in the top level of professional football in Ecuador.

== Club ==
=== Personnel ===
President: Guillermo Romero
President of the Executive Commission: Esteban Paz
Sporting manager: Santiago Jácome

=== Coaching staff ===
Manager: Luis Zubeldía
Assistant manager: Maximiliano Cuberas, Carlos Gruezo
Physical trainer: Lucas Vivas
Goalkeeper trainer: Luis Preti

=== Kits ===
Supplier: Puma
Sponsor(s): Banco Pichincha, Mazda, Universidad Indoamérica, Discover, Pilsener, Ecuabet, Salud SA

Home
Home 2
Home 3
Away
Third
Third
alternate 1

Type	Shirt	Shorts	Socks	Additional information
Home	White	White	White	Worn on February 19 (vs Gualaceo), March 5 (vs Universidad Católica), March 9 (vs Mushuc Runa), March 16 (vs Mushuc Runa), March 19 (vs Aucas), April 1 (vs Emelec), April 5 (vs Atlético Goianiense), April 12 (vs Deportes Antofagasta), April 17 (vs Barcelona SC), April 28 (vs Defensa y Justicia), May 1 (vs Independiente del Valle), May 8 (vs 9 de Octubre), May 18 (vs Defensa y Justicia), May 24 (vs Atlético Goianiense), May 29 (vs Macará), August 28 (vs Barcelona SC), September 4 (vs Orense), September 9 (vs Mushuc Runa), September 17 (vs Independiente del Valle)
Home 2	White	White	White	Worn on July 9 (vs Gualaceo), July 16 (vs Deportivo Cuenca), July 19 (vs Imbabura), July 24 (vs Universidad Católica), July 30 (vs Técnico Universitario), August 14 (vs Emelec), August 20 (vs Cumbayá)
Home 3	White	White	White	Worn on October 7 (vs Delfín), October 15 (vs Guayaquil City), October 22 (vs Macará)
Away	Aqua	Aqua	Aqua	Worn on February 25 (vs Deportivo Cuenca), March 12 (vs Técnico Universitario), April 9 (vs Cumbayá), April 20 (vs Orense), May 4 (vs Deportes Antofagasta), May 21 (vs Guayaquil City), June 5 (vs Manta), August 7 (vs Aucas)
Third	Navy Blue	Navy Blue	Navy Blue	
Third alternate 1	Navy Blue	Navy Blue	White	Worn on April 24 (vs Mushuc Runa), May 14 (vs Delfín), October 1 (vs 9 de Octubre)

== Squad information ==
Num	Pos	Nat.	Player	Age	Since	App	Goals	Notes
1	GK	URU	Gonzalo Falcón	25	2022	0	0	
2	DF	ARG	Zaid Romero	22	2022	0	0	
4	DF	ECU	Luis Caicedo	29	2019	39	0	
5	MF	ECU	Joseph Espinoza	21	2019	8	0	
6	DF	ECU	Luis Ayala	28	2019	48	0	
7	FW	ARG	Tomás Molina	26	2022	0	0	
8	MF	ARG	Ángel González	28	2022	0	0	
9	FW	ARG	Lucas Gamba	35	2022	0	0	
10	MF	ECU	Alexander Alvarado	22	2022	0	0	
11	MF	ECU	Michael Hoyos	30	2022	0	0	
13	DF	ECU	Daykol Romero	20	2021	6	0	
14	DF	ECU	José Quintero	31	2015	204	17	
15	DF	ECU	Franklin Guerra	29	2018	117	4	
17	MF	ECU	Gustavo Nnachi	19	2022	0	0	
18	MF	ARG	Lucas Piovi	30	2020	41	0	
20	DF	ECU	Christian Cruz	29	2018	105	4	
21	MF	ECU	Sebastián González	18	2021	9	1	
22	GK	ECU	Alexander Domínguez	35	2022	292	0	Previously with the club from '06–'16
23	GK	ECU	Adrián Gabbarini	36	2018	129	0	
24	DF	ECU	Moisés Corozo	29	2020	39	5	
25	DF	ECU	Andrés López	28	2022	0	0	
26	GK	ECU	Brian Heras	26	2022	0	0	
27	DF	ECU	Carlos Bazurto	16	2022	0	0	
28	MF	ECU	Juan David Macías	16	2022	0	0	
30	MF	ECU	Danny Luna	31	2022	0	0	
31	MF	ECU	Ariel Borja	16	2022	0	0	
34	MF	ECU	Ariel Mina	18	2021	3	0	
35	MF	ECU	Óscar Zambrano	17	2022	0	0	
38	FW	ECU	Juan Luis Anangonó	33	2022	115	40	Previously with the club in '14 and from '16–'19

Note: Caps and goals are of the national league and are current as of the beginning of the season.

=== Winter transfers ===
Players In
Name	Nat	Pos	Age	Moving from
Gonzalo Falcón	URU	GK	26	Boston River (Uruguay) (Loan)
Brian Heras	ECU	GK	26	Deportivo Cuenca (Ecuador)
Andrés López	ECU	DF	28	Universidad Católica (Ecuador)
Zaid Romero	ARG	DF	22	Godoy Cruz (Argentina) (Loan)
Jean Carlos Quiñónez	ECU	DF	20	Norte América (Ecuador) (Loan)
Andy Velasco	ECU	DF	25	Cumbayá (Ecuador) (Loan)
Alexander Alvarado	ECU	MF	22	Orlando City (United States) (Loan)
Michael Hoyos	ECU	MF	30	Barcelona SC (Ecuador) (Loan)
Gustavo Nnachi	ECU	MF	19	Aucas (Ecuador)
Joao Ortíz	ECU	MF	25	Delfín (Ecuador)
Jordan Gaspar	ECU	FW	26	Torrent CF (Spain)
Bryan de Jesús	ECU	FW	26	Olmedo (Ecuador)
Tomás Molina	ARG	FW	22	Ferro Carril Oeste (Argentina) (Loan)

Players Out
Name	Nat	Pos	Age	Moving to
José Cardenas	ECU	GK	26	Universidad Católica (Ecuador)
Pedro Perlaza	ECU	DF	30	Independiente del Valle (Ecuador)
Andersson Ordóñez	ECU	DF	27	Universidad Católica (Ecuador)
Carlos Rodríguez	URU	DF	31	Barcelona SC (Ecuador) (Loan)
Jordy Alcívar	ECU	MF	22	Charlotte FC (United States)
Billy Arce	ECU	MF	23	Brighton (England) (Loan return)
Marcos Caicedo	ECU	MF	30	Emelec (Ecuador)
Jhojan Julio	ECU	MF	23	Santos (Brazil) (Loan)
Lucas Villarruel	ARG	MF	31	TBA
Luis Amarilla	PAR	FW	26	Vélez Sarsfield (Argentina) (Loan return)
Juan Cruz Kaprof	ARG	FW	26	Central Córdoba (Argentina)
Djorkaeff Reasco	ECU	FW	22	Newell's Old Boys (Argentina)

=== Summer transfers ===
Players In
Name	Nat	Pos	Age	Moving from
Alexander Domínguez	ECU	GK	35	Deportes Tolima (Colombia)
Ángel González	ARG	MF	28	Estudiantes (Argentina) (loan)
Danny Luna	ECU	MF	31	9 de Octubre (Ecuador)
Juan Luis Anangonó	ECU	FW	33	Comunicaciones (Guatemala)
Lucas Gamba	ARG	FW	35	Rosario Central (Argentina)

Players Out
Name	Nat	Pos	Age	Moving to
Jean Carlos Quiñónez	ECU	DF	20	Guayaquil City (Ecuador)
Andy Velasco	ECU	DF	25	Independiente del Valle (Ecuador)
Jefferson Arce	ECU	MF	22	Macará (Ecuador) (Loan)
Joao Ortíz	ECU	MF	26	Independiente del Valle (Ecuador)
Santiago Scotto	URU	MF	25	Defensor Sporting (Uruguay) (Loan)
Nilson Angulo	ECU	FW	19	Anderlecht (Belgium)
Bryan de Jesús	ECU	FW	27	TBA
Jordan Gaspar	ECU	FW	26	TBA
Kevin Mercado	ECU	FW	27	Delfín (Ecuador)
Adolfo Muñoz	ECU	FW	24	Guayaquil City (Ecuador)

== Competitions ==
Competition	Started round	Final position / round	First match	Last match
LigaPro	First stage	4th	February 19	October 22
CONMEBOL Sudamericana	First stage	Group stage	March 9	May 24
Copa Ecuador	Round of 32	Round of 16	June 5	July 19

=== Pre-season friendlies ===
January 23 Copa de Campeones	L.D.U. Quito	2 - 1	Independiente del Valle	Quito
19:00 UTC−05:00	Muñoz 29'; Macías 62'		Cabezas 85'	Stadium: Estadio Rodrigo Paz Delgado; Referee: Juan Carlos Andrade

January 26 Copa de Campeones	9 de Octubre	1 - 2	L.D.U. Quito	Guayaquil
18:30 UTC−05:00	Da Luz 32'		Angulo 61'; Molina 90+8' (pen.)	Stadium: Estadio Modelo Alberto Spencer

January 29	L.D.U. Quito	2 - 0	Universidad Católica	Quito
10:00 UTC−05:00	Espinoza 51'; Hoyos 74'			Stadium: Estadio Rodrigo Paz Delgado

February 5 Noche Oriental	Aucas	0 - 1	L.D.U. Quito	Quito
18:00 UTC−05:00			Muñoz 75'	Stadium: Estadio Gonzalo Pozo Ripalda

February 9	L.D.U. Quito	2 - 2	Cumbayá	Quito
10:00 UTC−05:00	Hoyos (pen.); Arce		Carabalí; Cepeda	Stadium: Estadio Rodrigo Paz Delgado

February 12 Noche Blanca	L.D.U. Quito	2 - 2	Aucas	Quito
20:30 UTC−05:00	González 25'; Arce 90+3'		Fara 13'; Silva 77'	Stadium: Estadio Rodrigo Paz Delgado

=== LigaPro ===
The 2022 season was Liga's 61st season in the Serie A and their 21st consecutive.

==== First stage ====
Results summary

Overall								Home						Away					
Pld	W	D	L	GF	GA	GD	Pts	W	D	L	GF	GA	GD	W	D	L	GF	GA	GD
15	9	2	4	26	22	+4	29	7	1	0	20	11	+9	2	1	4	6	11	−5

Results by round

Round	1	2	3	4	5	6	7	8	9	10	11	12	13	14	15
Ground	H	A	H	A	H	A	A	H	A	H	A	H	H	A	H
Result	W	L	W	W	D	L	W	W	L	W	L	W	W	D	W
Position	7	12	5	2	2	4	2	2	2	2	4	4	3	4	3

Updated to match(es) played on May 29. Source: Competitive matches
A = Away; H = Home; W = Win; D = Draw; L = Loss

February 19 Round 1	L.D.U. Quito	1 - 0	Gualaceo	Quito
17:30 UTC−05:00	Arce 64', (yellow card) 65'	Report	Alles (yellow card) 47'	Stadium: Estadio Rodrigo Paz Delgado; Referee: Mario Romero

February 25 Round 2	Deportivo Cuenca	2 - 0	L.D.U. Quito	Cuenca
19:00 UTC−05:00	Mera (yellow card) 40'; Biojó 57', (red card) 68'; Mancinelli 63'	Report	Z. Romero (yellow card) 55'; Cruz (yellow card) 56'; Macías (yellow card) 80'	Stadium: Estadio Alejandro Serrano Aguilar; Referee: Álex Cajas

March 5 Round 3	L.D.U. Quito	2 - 1	Universidad Católica	Quito
17:30 UTC−05:00	Guerra (yellow card) 37'; Molina 82'; Alvarado 83', (yellow card) 90+1'; Arce (yellow card) 87'	Report	Anangonó (yellow card) 44'; Cevallos 45+2'; Mosquera (red card) 87'; Rentería (yellow card) 90'	Stadium: Estadio Rodrigo Paz Delgado; Referee: Franklin Congo

March 12 Round 4	Técnico Universitario	1 - 2	L.D.U. Quito	Ambato
17:30 UTC−05:00	Patta (yellow card) 35'; Estupiñán (yellow card) 53'; Sainz (yellow card) 70'; Tapiero 76' (pen.), (yellow card) 84'; Lastra (yellow card) 80'	Report	Piovi (yellow card) 43'; Molina 45+1', 52'; Angulo (yellow card) 90+4'	Stadium: Estadio Bellavista; Referee: Luis Quiroz

March 19 Round 5	L.D.U. Quito	4 - 4	Aucas	Quito
17:30 UTC−05:00	Alvarado 45+1' (pen.), 77' (pen.); Piovi (yellow card) 45+3'; Julio (yellow card) 68'; Angulo (red card) 78'; Arce 89', 90+2'	Report	Figueroa 10', (yellow card) 24'; Adé (yellow card) 11'; Tevez 18'; Frascarelli (yellow card) 45'; Mina 65', (yellow card) 82'; Briones 67'; Silva (yellow card) 69'; Vega (yellow card) 80'	Stadium: Estadio Rodrigo Paz Delgado; Referee: Marlon Vera

April 1 Round 6	Emelec	2 - 0	L.D.U. Quito	Guayaquil
21:00 UTC−05:00	Arroyo (yellow card) 1', (goal) 79'; Zapata 11'; Vera (yellow card) 75'; Carabalí (yellow card) 89'	Report	Piovi (yellow card) 36'	Stadium: Estadio George Capwell; Referee: Jaime Sánchez

April 9 Round 7	Cumbayá	0 - 2	L.D.U. Quito	Quito
19:30 UTC−05:00	Cepeda (yellow card) 29'; Hidalgo (yellow card) 34'; Arce (yellow card) 40'; Paredes (yellow card) 84'; Hernández (yellow card) 90+3'	Report	Molina 54'; Piovi (yellow card) 64'; Hoyos 90+4' (pen.), (yellow card) 90+5'	Stadium: Estadio Olímpico Atahualpa; Referee: Diego Lara

April 17 Round 8	L.D.U. Quito	2 - 0	Barcelona SC	Quito
18:00 UTC−05:00	Alvarado 17', (yellow card) 65'; Caicedo (yellow card) 32'; Hoyos (yellow card) 74'; Piovi (yellow card) 83'; Guerra 86'; Falcón (yellow card) 88'	Report	Molina (yellow card) 24'; Piñatares (yellow card) 43'; Carcelén (yellow card) 66' (yellow-red card) 70'; Velasco (yellow card) 70'; Cortez (yellow card) 88'	Stadium: Estadio Rodrigo Paz Delgado; Referee: Augusto Aragón

April 20 Round 9	Orense	3 - 0	L.D.U. Quito	Machala
15:00 UTC−05:00	Rojas 17'; Quiñónez 29', (yellow card) 61'; Acosta 74'; Andrade (yellow card) 84'	Report	Mina 87'; Quintero (yellow card) 90+1'	Stadium: Estadio 9 de Mayo; Referee: Franklin Congo

April 24 Round 10	L.D.U. Quito	3 - 2	Mushuc Runa	Quito
14:30 UTC−05:00	Hoyos 45+2', 51'; Angulo 87'	Report	Caicedo 69' (o.g.); Villalba 77'	Stadium: Estadio Rodrigo Paz Delgado; Referee: Diego Lara

May 1 Round 11	Independiente del Valle	1 - 0	L.D.U. Quito	Quito
19:00 UTC−05:00	Falcón 5' (o.g.); Ortíz (yellow card) 18'; Segovia (yellow card) 34'; López (yellow card) 45+3'; Chávez (yellow card) 84'	Report	Piovi (yellow card) 12'; Quintero (yellow card) 59'; Caicedo (yellow card) 61'	Stadium: Estadio Banco Guayaquil; Referee: Luis Quiroz

May 8 Round 12	L.D.U. Quito	2 - 0	9 de Octubre	Quito
16:30 UTC−05:00	Romero (yellow card) 45+10'; Hoyos 46'; Caicedo (yellow card) 49'; Molina 60', (yellow card) 83'	Report	Pinos (red card) 24'; Cangá (yellow card) 45+7'	Stadium: Estadio Rodrigo Paz Delgado; Referee: Carlos Orbe

May 14 Round 13	L.D.U. Quito	3 - 2	Delfín	Quito
19:00 UTC−05:00	Quiñónez (yellow card) 22'; Piovi (yellow card) 31'; Hoyos 34'; Angulo 52' de Jesús 90+5'	Report	Cifuente 45+3'; Rojas 54'; Plata (red card) 90'	Stadium: Estadio Rodrigo Paz Delgado; Referee: Franklin Congo

May 21 Round 14	Guayaquil City	2 - 2	L.D.U. Quito	Guayaquil
20:00 UTC−05:00	Quiñónez (yellow card) 15'; Klebinho 56'; Cabezas 67'	Report	Molina (yellow card) 14', (goal) 51'; Espinoza (yellow card) 73'; Hoyos 76'; Quintero (red card) 90+6'	Stadium: Estadio Christian Benítez Betancourt; Referee: Augusto Aragón

May 29 Round 15	L.D.U. Quito	3 - 2	Macará	Quito
18:00 UTC−05:00	Hernández 26' (o.g.); Molina 45+2'; Hoyos 76'; Cazula 63' (o.g.); Alvarado (yellow card) 77'	Report	Arce 23'; Ortigoza (yellow card) 45+4'; Mancilla 78'; Valencia (yellow card) 80'; Zambrano (yellow card) 90+3'	Stadium: Estadio Rodrigo Paz Delgado; Referee: Carlos Orbe

==== Second stage ====
Results summary

Overall								Home						Away					
Pld	W	D	L	GF	GA	GD	Pts	W	D	L	GF	GA	GD	W	D	L	GF	GA	GD
15	7	5	3	23	17	+6	26	4	2	1	11	5	+6	3	3	2	12	12	0

Results by round

Round	1	2	3	4	5	6	7	8	9	10	11	12	13	14	15
Ground	A	H	A	H	A	H	H	A	H	A	H	A	A	H	A
Result	W	D	L	W	D	W	W	D	L	W	D	D	L	W	W
Position	8	4	13	6	8	4	3	5	6	4	6	6	6	4	4

Updated to match(es) played on October 22. Source: Competitive matches
A = Away; H = Home; W = Win; D = Draw; L = Loss

July 9 Round 1	Gualaceo	0 - 1	L.D.U. Quito	Azogues
20:00 UTC−05:00	Ávila (yellow card) 29'; Preciado (yellow card) 43'	Report	Anangonó 45+1'; Guerra (yellow card) 48'; Piovi (yellow card) 56'; López (yellow card) 88'	Stadium: Estadio Jorge Andrade; Referee: Franklin Congo

July 16 Round 2	L.D.U. Quito	1 - 1	Deportivo Cuenca	Quito
17:30 UTC−05:00	Alvarado 36'; Espinoza (yellow card) 86'	Report	García Basso (yellow card) 23', (goal) 84'; Duarte (yellow card) 60'; Biojó (yellow card) 66'	Stadium: Estadio Rodrigo Paz Delgado; Referee: Guillermo Guerrero

July 24 Round 3	Universidad Católica	4 - 0	L.D.U. Quito	Quito
16:30 UTC−05:00	Ordóñez 5'; Díaz (yellow card) 13', (goal) 69'; Vivar (yellow card) 25'; Anangonó 31' (o.g.); Rodríguez 33'	Report	Espinoza (yellow card) 20' (yellow-red card) 39'; Quintero (yellow card) 30'; Molina (yellow card) 79'	Stadium: Estadio Olímpico Atahualpa; Referee: Luis Quiroz

July 30 Round 4	L.D.U. Quito	2 - 0	Técnico Universitario	Quito
17:30 UTC−05:00	Guerra (yellow card) 22'; Quintero (yellow card) 24'; Piovi (yellow card) 65'; Molina 86', (yellow card) 87'; Alvarado (yellow card) 87'; S. González 90+7'	Report	Blanco (yellow card) 22'; Mina (yellow card) 27' (yellow-red card) 73'; Estupiñán (yellow card) 28'; Jiménez (yellow card) 52' (yellow-red card) 53'; Chávez (yellow card) 72'; Carcelén (yellow card) 72'	Stadium: Estadio Rodrigo Paz Delgado; Referee: Augusto Aragón

August 7 Round 5	Aucas	1 - 1	L.D.U. Quito	Quito
14:00 UTC−05:00	Adé (yellow card) 7'; Ordóñez 32', (yellow card) 49'; Cuero (yellow card) 37'; Figueroa (yellow card) 52', López (yellow card) 73'	Report	Domínguez (yellow card) 7'; Luna 90+4'	Stadium: Estadio Gonzalo Pozo Ripalda; Referee: Franklin Congo

August 14 Round 6	L.D.U. Quito	2 - 0	Emelec	Quito
18:00 UTC−05:00	Piovi (yellow card) 15'; Alvarado 25', 88', (yellow card) 89'; Corozo (yellow card) 69'; A. González (yellow card) 76'	Report	Arroyo (yellow card) 17' (yellow-red card) 60'; Zapata (yellow card) 82'	Stadium: Estadio Rodrigo Paz Delgado; Referee: Luis Quiroz

August 20 Round 7	L.D.U. Quito	1 - 0	Cumbayá	Quito
17:30 UTC−05:00	Molina 27'; Corozo (yellow card) 82'	Report	Almagro (yellow card) 25'; Arce (yellow card) 28'; Ramírez (yellow card) 49'	Stadium: Estadio Rodrigo Paz Delgado; Referee: Gabriel González

August 28 Round 8	Barcelona SC	1 - 1	L.D.U. Quito	Guayaquil
19:00 UTC−05:00	Rodríguez 4'; Perlaza (yellow card) 39'; Quiñónez (yellow card) 57'; Carcelén (yellow card) 63'	Report	Alvarado (yellow card) 32'; A. González (yellow card) 51'; Hoyos 85'; Quintero (red card) 90'	Stadium: Estadio Monumental Banco Pichincha; Referee: Augusto Aragón

September 4 Round 9	L.D.U. Quito	1 - 2	Orense	Quito
16:30 UTC−05:00	Alvarado (yellow card) 16', (goal) 76'; Molina (yellow card) 25'; Hoyos (yellow card) 39'; Corozo (yellow card) 84'; Guerra (yellow card) 89' (yellow-red card) 90'	Report	Andrade 4', (yellow card) 90+2'; Calderón 7'; Achilier (yellow card) 10'; Silva (yellow card) 22'; Quiñónez (yellow card) 66'; Portocarrero (yellow card) 69'; Kouffati (red card) 90+4'; Corozo (red card) 90+5'	Stadium: Estadio Rodrigo Paz Delgado; Referee: Marlon Vera

September 9 Round 10	Mushuc Runa	2 - 1	L.D.U. Quito	Ambato
19:00 UTC−05:00	Delgado (yellow card) 34', (goal) 45+6'; Mina (yellow card) 75'	Report	Alvarado 22'; Anangonó (yellow card) 61'; Romero (yellow card) 69'; Molina 71'	Stadium: Estadio Bellavista; Referee: Franklin Congo

September 17 Round 11	L.D.U. Quito	2 - 2	Independiente del Valle	Quito
18:00 UTC−05:00	Hoyos 40', (yellow card) 65'; Anangonó 81'	Report	Angulo 14'; Chávez 16'; Carabajal (yellow card) 47'; Segovia (yellow card) 51'; Faravelli (yellow card) 89'; Pellerano (yellow card) 90+5'	Stadium: Estadio Rodrigo Paz Delgado; Referee: Roberto Sánchez

October 1 Round 12	9 de Octubre	2 - 2	L.D.U. Quito	Milagro
17:45 UTC−05:00	Caicedo (yellow card) 63'; Cortez 88' (pen.); Vergés 89'	Report	Corozo (yellow card) 11'; González 34'; Romero (yellow card) 41' (yellow-red card) 50'; Molina 43'; Guerra (yellow card) 47'; Domínguez (yellow card) 54'; Piovi (red card) 77'; Cruz (yellow card) 90+1'	Stadium: Estadio Los Chirijos; Referee: Marlon Vera

October 7 Round 13	Delfín	3 - 0	L.D.U. Quito	Manta
19:00 UTC−05:00	Caicedo 35'; Alman (yellow card) 42'; Vélez 78'; Chicaiza 90+2' (pen.), (yellow card) 90+3'	Report	Zambrano (yellow card) 25'; Molina (yellow card) 45+1'; Cruz (yellow card) 73'; Corozo (red card) 90+1'	Stadium: Estadio Jocay; Referee: Luis Quiroz

October 15 Round 14	L.D.U. Quito	2 - 0	Guayaquil City	Quito
18:00 UTC−05:00	Quintero (yellow card) 67'; Humanante 71' (o.g.); Molina 72'; Ayala (yellow card) 74'	Report		Stadium: Estadio Rodrigo Paz Delgado; Referee: Guillermo Guerrero

October 22 Round 15	Macará	0 - 5	L.D.U. Quito	Ambato
13:00 UTC−05:00	Caicedo (yellow card) 18'; Peña (yellow card) 74'; Hernández (yellow card) 86'	Report	A. González 2'; Alvarado 45'; Zambrano 54'; Molina 59' (pen.); Romero (yellow card) 62'; Piovi (yellow card) 76'; Anangonó 83'; Quintero (yellow card) 90+2'	Stadium: Estadio Bellavista; Referee: Anthony Díaz

=== CONMEBOL Sudamericana ===
L.D.U. Quito qualified to the 2022 CONMEBOL Sudamericana—their 13rd participation in the continental tournament—as 6th place in the 2021 LigaPro. They entered the competition in the First Stage.

==== CONMEBOL Sudamericana squad ====
No.	Pos.	Nation	Player
1	GK	URU	Gonzalo Falcón
2	DF	ARG	Zaid Romero
3	DF	ECU	Jean Carlos Quiñónez
4	DF	ECU	Luis Caicedo
5	MF	ECU	Joseph Espinoza
6	DF	ECU	Luis Ayala
7	FW	ARG	Tomás Molina
8	MF	ECU	Alexander Alvarado
9	FW	ECU	Jordan Gaspar
11	MF	ECU	Michael Hoyos
13	DF	ECU	Daykol Romero
14	DF	ECU	José Quintero
15	DF	ECU	Franklin Guerra
16	FW	ECU	Bryan de Jesús
17	MF	ECU	Gustavo Nnachi
18	MF	ARG	Lucas Piovi (captain)

No.	Pos.	Nation	Player
19	MF	URU	Santiago Scotto
20	DF	ECU	Christian Cruz
21	MF	ECU	Sebastián González
22	GK	ECU	Adrián Gabbarini
23	MF	ECU	Joao Ortíz
24	DF	ECU	Moisés Corozo
25	MF	ECU	Andrés López
26	GK	ECU	Brian Heras
27	DF	ECU	Carlos Bazurto
28	MF	ECU	Juan David Macías
29	MF	ECU	Adolfo Muñoz
30	FW	ECU	Kevin Mercado
31	MF	ECU	Jefferson Arce
32	MF	ECU	Nilson Angulo
35	MF	ECU	Óscar Zambrano

Overall								Home						Away					
Pld	W	D	L	GF	GA	GD	Pts	W	D	L	GF	GA	GD	W	D	L	GF	GA	GD
8	4	3	1	14	10	+4	15	1	3	0	8	4	+4	3	0	1	6	6	0

==== First stage ====
March 9 First Stage	Mushuc Runa (Ecuador)	0 - 2	(Ecuador) L.D.U. Quito	Ambato, Ecuador
19:30 UTC−05:00	Carabalí (yellow card) 36'; Santacruz (yellow card) 80'; Giordana (yellow card) 87'	Report	Cruz (yellow card) 40'; Z. Romero (yellow card) 44', (goal) 62'; González (yellow card) 54'; Guerra (yellow card) 64'; Alvarado 87'	Stadium: Estadio Bellavista; Referee: Carlos Betancur (Colombia)

March 16 First Stage	L.D.U. Quito (Ecuador)	1 - 1	(Ecuador) Mushuc Runa	Quito, Ecuador
19:30 UTC−05:00	Alvarado 27'; Piovi (yellow card) 31'; López (yellow card) 82'	Report	Quilumba (yellow card) 43'; Carabalí (yellow card) 52'; Alonso 64'; Llama (yellow card) 87'	Stadium: Estadio Rodrigo Paz Delgado; Referee: Leodán González (Uruguay)

==== Group stage ====
Pos	Team	Pld	W	D	L	GF	GA	GD	Pts	Qualification	ACG	LDQ	ANT	DYJ
1	(Brazil) Atlético Goianiense	6	4	1	1	11	5	+6	13	Round of 16	—	4–0	1–0	3–2
2	(Ecuador) LDU Quito	6	3	2	1	11	9	+2	11		1–1	—	4–0	2–2
3	(Chile) Deportes Antofagasta	6	2	0	4	6	11	−5	6		2–1	1–2	—	1–3
4	(Argentina) Defensa y Justicia	6	1	1	4	8	11	−3	4		0–1	1–2	0–2	—

Source: CONMEBOL

April 5 Group Stage	Atlético Goianiense (Brazil)	4 - 0	(Ecuador) L.D.U. Quito	Goiânia, Brazil
21:30 UTC−03:00	Edson (yellow card) 35'; Jorginho 62'; Shaylon 77'; Hayner 87'; Rickson 90+4'	Report	Ayala (yellow card) 72'; Caicedo (yellow card) 77'	Stadium: Estádio Antônio Accioly; Referee: Gery Vargas (Bolivia)

April 12 Group Stage	L.D.U. Quito (Ecuador)	4 - 0	(Chile) Deportes Antofagasta	Quito, Ecuador
19:30 UTC−05:00	Angulo 47'; Cornejo 50' (o.g.); Hoyos (yellow card) 75'; Molina 77'; Arce 90+2'	Report	Sánchez (yellow card) 51'; Bravo (yellow card) 72'; Nieto (yellow card) 73'	Stadium: Estadio Rodrigo Paz Delgado; Referee: Augusto Menéndez (Peru)

April 28 Group Stage	Defensa y Justicia (Argentina)	1 - 2	(Ecuador) L.D.U. Quito	Florencio Varela, Argentina
19:15 UTC−03:00	Albertengo 82', (yellow card) 90+1'; Tripichio (yellow card) 85'; Fontana (yellow card) 90+1'	Report	Alvarado 55', 87'; Arce (yellow card) 90+1'	Stadium: Estadio Norberto "Tito" Tomaghello; Referee: Gery Vargas (Bolivia)

May 4 Group Stage	Deportes Antofagasta (Chile)	1 - 2	(Ecuador) L.D.U. Quito	Antofagasta, Chile
18:15 UTC−04:00	López 18'; Flores (yellow card) 76'; Vega (yellow card) 80'; Bravo (yellow card) 90'; Ahumada (red card) 73'	Report	Romero (yellow card) 12'; Alvarado (yellow card) 37'; Angulo 52'; Corozo (yellow card) 59'; López 67'; Caicedo (yellow card) 90+1'	Stadium: Estadio Regional de Antofagasta; Referee: Michael Espinoza (Peru)

May 18 Group Stage	L.D.U. Quito (Ecuador)	2 - 2	(Argentina) Defensa y Justicia	Quito, Ecuador
19:30 UTC−05:00	Quintero 5'; Alvarado (yellow card) 47'; Angulo 71'; Ayala (yellow card) 74'	Report	Cardona (yellow card) 12'; Albertengo 29', 44', (yellow card) 66'; Alanís (yellow card) 45+1'; Duarte (yellow card) 77'; Pieres (yellow card) 90+2'	Stadium: Estadio Rodrigo Paz Delgado; Referee: Nicolás Gallo (Colombia)

May 24 Group Stage	L.D.U. Quito (Ecuador)	1 - 1	(Brazil) Atlético Goianiense	Quito, Ecuador
19:30 UTC−05:00	Piovi (yellow card) 25'; Hoyos 29'; Angulo (yellow card) 41'; Alvarado (yellow card) 75'; Nnachi (yellow card) 77'; Arce (yellow card) 85'	Report	Ramon (yellow card) 6'; Jorginho (yellow card) 43'; Airton (yellow card) 57'; Edson (yellow card) 62'; Gabriel Baralhas 65'; Hayner (yellow card) 70'	Stadium: Estadio Rodrigo Paz Delgado; Referee: Gustavo Tejera (Uruguay)

=== Copa Ecuador ===
L.D.U. Quito entered the competition in the Round of 32.

Overall								Home						Away					
Pld	W	D	L	GF	GA	GD	Pts	W	D	L	GF	GA	GD	W	D	L	GF	GA	GD
2	1	0	1	2	2	0	3	0		0	0	0	0	1	0	1	2	2	0

==== Round of 32 ====
June 5 Round of 32	Manta	0 - 1	L.D.U. Quito	Manta
15:30 UTC−05:00	Peñarrieta (yellow card) 29'; Romero (yellow card) 47'; Batalla (yellow card) 74'; Portocarrero (yellow card) 84' (yellow-red card) 90+3'	Report	López (yellow card) 56'; Angulo 71'; Nnachi (yellow card) 79'	Stadium: Estadio Jocay; Referee: Carlos Aroca

==== Round of 16 ====
July 19 Round of 16	Imbabura	2 - 1	L.D.U. Quito	Ibarra
19:00 UTC−05:00	Pantoja 2', (yellow card) 82'; Vásconez (yellow card) 26'; Rodríguez 69'; Valero (yellow card) 90'	Report	Hoyos 16'; Zambrano (yellow card) 46'; Piovi (yellow card) 90'	Stadium: Estadio Olímpico de Ibarra; Referee: Marlon Vera

== Player statistics ==
Num	Pos	Player	App	Goal	Yellow card	Red card	App	Goal	Yellow card	Red card	App	Goal	Yellow card	Red card	App	Goal	Yellow card	Red card
Num	Pos	Player	LigaPro				CONMEBOL Sudamericana				Copa Ecuador				Total			
1	GK	Gonzalo Falcón	15	—	1	—	8	—	—	—	1	—	—	—	24	—	1	—
2	DF	Zaid Romero	27	—	4	1	7	1	2	—	2	—	—	—	36	1	6	1
4	DF	Luis Caicedo	15	—	3	—	6	—	2	—	1	—	—	—	22	—	5	—
5	MF	Joseph Espinoza	14	—	2	1	2	—	—	—	2	—	—	—	18	—	2	1
6	DF	Luis Ayala	19	—	1	—	6	—	2	—	2	—	—	—	27	—	3	—
7	FW	Tomás Molina	27	13	6	—	8	1	—	—	1	—	—	—	36	14	6	—
8	MF	Ángel González	9	1	2	—	—	—	—	—	—	—	—	—	9	1	2	—
9	FW	Lucas Gamba	12	—	—	—	—	—	—	—	—	—	—	—	12	—	—	—
10	MF	Alexander Alvarado	27	10	7	—	8	4	3	—	—	—	—	—	35	14	10	—
11	MF	Michael Hoyos	26	8	4	—	7	1	1	—	2	1	—	—	35	10	5	—
13	DF	Daykol Romero	10	—	—	—	—	—	—	—	—	—	—	—	10	—	—	—
14	DF	José Quintero	23	—	6	2	7	1	—	—	2	—	—	—	32	1	6	2
15	DF	Franklin Guerra	24	1	4	1	5	—	1	—	2	—	—	—	31	1	5	1
17	MF	Gustavo Nnachi	9	—	—	—	1	—	1	—	1	—	1	—	11	—	2	—
18	MF	Lucas Piovi	25	—	11	1	8	—	2	—	2	—	1	—	35	—	14	1
20	DF	Christian Cruz	14	—	3	—	3	—	1	—	1	—	—	—	18	—	4	—
21	MF	Sebastián González	19	2	—	—	2	—	1	—	2	—	—	—	23	2	1	—
22	GK	Alexander Domínguez	13	—	2	—	—	—	—	—	—	—	—	—	13	—	2	—
23	GK	Adrián Gabbarini	—	—	—	—	—	—	—	—	—	—	—	—	—	—	—	—
24	DF	Moisés Corozo	13	—	4	1	3	—	1	—	—	—	—	—	16	—	5	1
25	DF	Andrés López	17	—	1	—	5	1	1	—	2	—	1	—	24	1	3	—
26	GK	Brian Heras	2	—	—	—	—	—	—	—	1	—	—	—	3	—	—	—
27	DF	Carlos Bazurto	—	—	—	—	—	—	—	—	—	—	—	—	—	—	—	—
28	MF	Juan David Macías	3	—	1	—	—	—	—	—	—	—	—	—	3	—	1	—
30	MF	Danny Luna	13	1	—	—	—	—	—	—	1	—	—	—	14	1	—	—
31	MF	Ariel Borja	1	—	—	—	—	—	—	—	—	—	—	—	1	—	—	—
34	FW	Ariel Mina	1	—	1	—	—	—	—	—	—	—	—	—	1	—	1	—
35	FW	Óscar Zambrano	13	1	1	—	2	—	—	—	2	—	1	—	17	1	2	—
38	FW	Juan Luis Anangonó	14	3	1	—	—	—	—	—	1	—	—	—	15	3	1	—
3	DF	Jean Carlos Quiñónez	3	—	1	—	1	—	—	—	—	—	—	—	4	—	1	—
9	FW	Jordan Gaspar	2	—	—	—	—	—	—	—	—	—	—	—	2	—	—	—
10	MF	Jhojan Julio	5	—	1	—	1	—	—	—	—	—	—	—	6	—	1	—
16	FW	Bryan de Jesús	3	1	—	—	2	—	—	—	—	—	—	—	5	1	—	—
19	MF	Santiago Scotto	4	—	—	—	2	—	—	—	—	—	—	—	6	—	—	—
23	MF	Joao Ortíz	13	—	—	—	8	—	—	—	—	—	—	—	21	—	—	—
29	MF	Adolfo Muñoz	11	—	—	—	5	—	—	—	—	—	—	—	16	—	—	—
30	FW	Kevin Mercado	—	—	—	—	—	—	—	—	—	—	—	—	—	—	—	—
31	MF	Jefferson Arce	12	3	2	—	7	1	2	—	1	—	—	—	20	4	4	—
32	MF	Nilson Angulo	13	2	1	1	8	3	1	—	1	1	—	—	22	6	2	1
Totals			—	46	70	8	—	13	21	0	—	2	4	0	—	61	95	8

As of October 22, 2022

Note: Players in italics left the club mid-season.

== Team statistics ==
	Total	Home	Away
Total Games played	40	19	21
Total Games won	21	12	9
Total Games drawn	10	6	4
Total Games lost	9	1	8
Games played (LigaPro)	30	15	15
Games won (LigaPro)	16	11	5
Games drawn (LigaPro)	7	3	4
Games lost (LigaPro)	7	1	6
Games played (CONMEBOL Sudamericana)	8	4	4
Games won (CONMEBOL Sudamericana)	4	1	3
Games drawn (CONMEBOL Sudamericana)	3	3	
Games lost (CONMEBOL Sudamericana)	1		1
Games played (Copa Ecuador)	2		2
Games won (Copa Ecuador)	1		1
Games drawn (Copa Ecuador)			
Games lost (Copa Ecuador)	1		1
Biggest win (LigaPro)	5 - 0 vs Macará	2 - 0 vs Barcelona SC; 2 - 0 vs 9 de Octubre; 2 - 0 vs Técnico Universitario; 2 - 0 vs Emelec; 2 - 0 vs Guayaquil City	5 - 0 vs Macará
Biggest loss (LigaPro)	0 - 4 vs Universidad Católica	1 - 2 vs Orense	0 - 4 vs Universidad Católica
Biggest win (CONMEBOL Sudamericana)	4 - 0 vs Deportes Antofagasta	4 - 0 vs Deportes Antofagasta	2 - 0 vs Mushuc Runa
Biggest loss (CONMEBOL Sudamericana)	0 - 4 vs Atlético Goianiense		0 - 4 vs Atlético Goianiense
Biggest win (Copa Ecuador)	1 - 0 vs Manta		1 - 0 vs Manta
Biggest loss (Copa Ecuador)	1 - 2 vs Imbabura		1 - 2 vs Imbabura
Clean sheets	13	8	5
Goals scored	65	39	26
Goals conceded	51	20	31
Goal difference	+14	+19	-5
Average GF per game	1.63	2.05	1.24
Average GA per game	1.28	1.05	1.48
Yellow cards	95	45	50
Red cards	8	2	6
Most appearances	Tomás Molina (36); Zaid Romero (36)	Alexander Alvarado (18); Tomás Molina (18); Lucas Piovi (18); Zaid Romero (18)	Franklin Guerra (19); Michael Hoyos (19)
Most minutes played	Lucas Piovi (3079)	Lucas Piovi (1620)	Zaid Romero (1487)
Top scorer	Alexander Alvarado (14); Tomás Molina (14)	Alexander Alvarado (9)	Tomás Molina (7)
Worst discipline	José Quintero (2) (red card)	Franklin Guerra (1) (red card) (2) (yellow card)	José Quintero (2) (red card)
Penalties for	4/4 (100%)	2/2 (100%)	2/2 (100%)
Penalties against	3/4 (75%)		3/4 (75%)
League Points	55/90 (61.11%)	36/45 (80%)	19/45 (42.22%)
Winning rate	52.5%	63.16%	42.86%

As of October 22, 2022
Source: See Competitive matches (above)
