= Daniel Martínez =

Daniel Martínez or Martinez may refer to:

- Daniel Martínez (politician) (born 1957), Uruguayan politician
- Daniel Joseph Martinez (born 1957), American artist
- Daniel Martinez (footballer, born 1973), Swedish footballer
- Daniel Martínez (footballer, born 1981), Uruguayan footballer
- Daniel Martínez (footballer, born 1991), Uruguayan footballer
- Daniel Martínez (cyclist) (born 1996), Colombian racing cyclist
- Daniel Martínez (footballer, born 1997), Argentine footballer
- Daniel Martínez (guitarist) (born 1993), Spanish flamenco guitar player
- Danny Martinez (born 1985), American mixed martial arts fighter
