= Juan Macías (disambiguation) =

John Macias or in Spanish, Juan Macías, was a Spanish saint.

Juan Macías may also refer to:

- Juan Carlos Macías (born 1945), Argentine directors
- Juan José Serrano Macías (born 1981), Spanish footballer
- Juan Macías (footballer), Ecuadorian footballer
