= Zaid Romero =

Argentine footballer

Personal information
- Full name: Zaid Abner Romero
- Date of birth: 15 December 1999 (age 26)
- Place of birth: Mendoza, Argentina
- Height: 1.92 m (6 ft 4 in)
- Position: Centre-back

Team information
- Current team: Getafe
- Number: 24

Youth career
- Godoy Cruz

Senior career*
| Years | Team | Apps | (Gls) |
| 2019–2023 | Godoy Cruz | 2 | (0) |
| 2021 | → Villa Dálmine (loan) | 25 | (0) |
| 2022 | → LDU Quito (loan) | 27 | (0) |
| 2023–2024 | Estudiantes | 46 | (4) |
| 2024–2026 | Club Brugge | 13 | (0) |
| 2026 | → Getafe (loan) | 15 | (1) |
| 2026– | Getafe | 7 | (0) |
- * Club domestic league appearances and goals as of 20:45, 6 November 2026 (UTC)

Zaid Abner Romero (born 15 December 1999) is an Argentine professional footballer who plays as a centre-back for La Liga club Getafe.

== Career ==
=== Godoy Cruz ===
Romero made his professional debut with Godoy Cruz in a 2−0 Argentine Primera División loss to Defensa y Justicia on 8 December 2019.

At the end of February 2021, Romero was sent out on loan to Primera Nacional club Villa Dálmine for the rest of the year. He left the club and returned to Godoy Cruz at the end of 2021, with a total of 25 appearances for the club. In January 2022, Romero was once again sent out on loan, this time to Ecuadorian Serie A side LDU Quito until the end of 2022 with a purchase option. The deal was confirmed on 20 December 2021.

=== Estudiantes ===
Romero was acquired by Estudiantes de La Plata in December 2022, with a contract signed until December 2026. With the team he won a local tournament (2024) and a national cup (2023).

=== Club Brugge ===
On 30 June 2024, Romero signed a four-year contract with Club Brugge in Belgium.

=== Getafe ===
On 17 January 2026, Romero moved to La Liga side Getafe on loan until June. On 6 July, he signed a permanent four-year contract with the club.

== Personal life ==
Born in Argentina, Romero is of Syrian descent.

== Career statistics ==
As of match played 10 October 2026

Appearances and goals by club, season and competition
| Club | Season | League | | | National cup (Note: Includes Copa Ecuador, Copa Argentina, Belgian Cup) | | Continental | | Other | | Total | |
| Club | Season | Division | Apps | Goals | Apps | Goals | Apps | Goals | Apps | Goals | Apps | Goals |
|---|---|---|---|---|---|---|---|---|---|---|---|---|
| Godoy Cruz | 2019–20 | AFA Liga Profesional de Fútbol | 2 | 0 | 0 | 0 | — | | — | | 2 | 0 |
| Villa Dálmine (loan) | 2021 | Primera Nacional | 25 | 0 | 0 | 0 | — | | — | | 25 | 0 |
| LDU Quito (loan) | 2022 | LigaPro Serie A | 27 | 0 | 2 | 0 | 7 (Note: Appearances in Copa Sudamericana) | 1 | — | | 36 | 1 |
| Estudiantes (LP) | 2023 | AFA Liga Profesional de Fútbol | 28 | 2 | 3 | 1 | 6 | 0 | — | | 37 | 3 |
| Estudiantes (LP) | 2024 | AFA Liga Profesional de Fútbol | 18 | 2 | 1 | 1 | 5 (Note: Appearances in Copa Libertadores) | 0 | 1 (Note: Appearance in Supercopa Argentina) | 0 | 24 | 3 |
| Estudiantes (LP) | Total | | 46 | 4 | 4 | 2 | 11 | 0 | 1 | 0 | 62 | 6 |
| Club Brugge | 2024–25 | Belgian Pro League | 12 | 0 | 2 | 0 | 1 (Note: Appearance(s) in UEFA Champions League) | 0 | 1 (Note: Appearance in Belgian Super Cup) | 0 | 16 | 0 |
| Club Brugge | 2025–26 | Belgian Pro League | 1 | 0 | 1 | 0 | 4 | 0 | 1 | 0 | 7 | 0 |
| Club Brugge | Total | | 13 | 0 | 3 | 0 | 5 | 0 | 2 | 0 | 23 | 0 |
| Getafe (loan) | 2025–26 | La Liga | 15 | 1 | — | | — | | — | | 15 | 1 |
| Getafe | 2026–27 | La Liga | 7 | 0 | 0 | 0 | 2 (Note: Appearances in UEFA Conference League) | 0 | — | | 9 | 0 |
| Getafe | Getafe total | | 22 | 1 | 0 | 0 | 2 | 0 | — | | 32 | 0 |
| Career total | | | 135 | 5 | 9 | 2 | 25 | 1 | 3 | 0 | 172 | 8 |

== Honours ==
Estudiantes de La Plata

- Copa Argentina: 2023
- Copa de la Liga Profesional: 2024

Club Brugge

- Belgian Cup: 2024–25
