= Juan Manuel Vázquez =

Juan Manuel Vázquez may refer to:

- Juan Manuel Vázquez (footballer), Argentine forward for Barracas Central
- Juan Manuel Vázquez (handballer), Argentine handballer at the 2012 Summer Olympics
