= Ignacio Colombini =

Argentine professional footballer

Personal information
- Full name: Ignacio Mario Manuel Colombini
- Date of birth: 12 May 1992 (age 34)
- Place of birth: Salto, Argentina
- Height: 1.73 m (5 ft 8 in)
- Position: Forward

Team information
- Current team: Boca Unidos

Youth career
- Racing Club

Senior career*
Years	Team	Apps	(Gls)
2010–2013	Racing Club	5	(0)
2013–2014	Miramar Misiones	11	(2)
2014–2015	Almagro	32	(2)
2016	Quilmes	8	(0)
2016–2018	Almirante Brown	65	(18)
2018–2019	Atlanta	34	(17)
2019	Sol de América	17	(4)
2020	Defensor Sporting	13	(2)
2021	Atlanta	31	(10)
2022	Almirante Brown	19	(6)
2022	Audax Italiano	7	(1)
2023	Ferro Carril Oeste	21	(4)
2024–2025	Olimpia	8	(1)
2025–	Boca Unidos	4	(0)
- * Club domestic league appearances and goals as of 18:06, 11 June 2025 (UTC)

Ignacio Mario Manuel Colombini (born 12 May 1992) is an Argentine professional footballer who plays as a forward for Boca Unidos.

== Career ==
Colombini, who is of Italian descent, moved into senior football with Primera División side Racing Club. He made five appearances in total for the Avellaneda outfit, including for his senior bow on 2 February 2010 against Colón at the Estadio Brigadier General Estanislao López. In August 2013, Colombini switched Argentina for Uruguay after agreeing terms with Miramar Misiones. He featured eleven times in the 2013–14 Uruguayan Primera División as they suffered relegation, though he didn't feature in the second half of the campaign; he also netted two goals, scoring in fixtures with Montevideo Wanderers and Cerro Largo.

Colombini returned to his homeland with Almagro in July 2014. He scored on his starting debut against Platense, on the way to appearing thirty-two times across two seasons in Primera B Metropolitana. Colombini made a return to the top-flight in January 2016 with Quilmes, though went back to the third tier seven months later by joining Almirante Brown. He remained for 2016–17 and 2017–18, scoring nine goals in each campaign which included braces over Talleres and Deportivo Español. Fellow Primera B Metropolitana team Atlanta signed Colombini on 29 July 2018. Fourteen goals in his opening twenty-seven games came.

June 2019 saw Colombini agree a move to Paraguayan football with Sol de América. He netted on debut against Nacional, with further goals in the Primera División versus Deportivo Santaní (home and away) and San Lorenzo arriving as they finished fifth. In January 2020, Colombini headed back to Uruguay to join Defensor Sporting. He'd score away goals against Liverpool and Boston River across the 2020 season, before departing at the end of the year following the expiration of his contract. On 8 February 2021, Colombini sealed a return to Atlanta; who were now a Primera B Nacional club.

Ahead of the 2022 season, Colombini returned to his former club Almirante Brown. On second half 2022, he moved to Chile and joined Audax Italiano.

== Career statistics ==
As of 9 February 2021.

Appearances and goals by club, season and competition
Club	Season	League			Cup		League Cup		Continental		Other		Total	
Club	Season	Division	Apps	Goals	Apps	Goals	Apps	Goals	Apps	Goals	Apps	Goals	Apps	Goals
Racing Club	2009–10	Argentine Primera División	1	0	0	0	—		—		0	0	1	0
Racing Club	2010–11	Argentine Primera División	2	0	0	0	—		—		0	0	2	0
Racing Club	2011–12	Argentine Primera División	0	0	0	0	—		—		0	0	0	0
Racing Club	2012–13	Argentine Primera División	2	0	0	0	—		0	0	0	0	2	0
Racing Club	Total		5	0	0	0	—		0	0	0	0	5	0
Miramar Misiones	2013–14	Uruguayan Primera División	11	2	—		—		—		0	0	11	2
Almagro	2014	Primera B Metropolitana	15	1	0	0	—		—		0	0	15	1
Almagro	2015	Primera B Metropolitana	17	1	0	0	—		—		0	0	17	1
Almagro	Total		32	2	0	0	—		—		0	0	32	2
Quilmes	2016	Argentine Primera División	8	0	0	0	—		—		0	0	8	0
Almirante Brown	2016–17	Primera B Metropolitana	31	9	0	0	—		—		0	0	31	9
Almirante Brown	2017–18	Primera B Metropolitana	34	9	0	0	—		—		0	0	34	9
Almirante Brown	Total		65	18	0	0	—		—		0	0	65	18
Atlanta	2018–19	Primera B Metropolitana	34	17	0	0	—		—		0	0	34	17
Sol de América	2019	Paraguayan Primera División	17	4	0	0	—		—		0	0	17	4
Defensor Sporting	2020	Uruguayan Primera División	13	2	—		—		—		0	0	13	2
Atlanta	2021	Primera B Nacional	0	0	0	0	—		—		0	0	0	0
Career total			185	45	0	0	—		0	0	0	0	185	45
