= Gonzalo Falcón =

Uruguayan footballer (born 1996)

Personal information
- Full name: Gonzalo Adrián Falcón Vitancour
- Date of birth: 16 November 1996 (age 29)
- Place of birth: Montevideo, Uruguay
- Height: 1.90 m (6 ft 3 in)
- Position: Goalkeeper

Team information
- Current team: Sportivo Luqueño
- Number: 1

Youth career
- Juventud

Senior career*
Years	Team	Apps	(Gls)
2016–2017	Juventud	20	(0)
2018–2021	Boston River	131	(0)
2022	L.D.U. Quito	15	(0)
2023–	Sportivo Luqueño	33	(0)
- * Club domestic league appearances and goals as of 30 May 2022

Gonzalo Adrián Falcón Vitancour (born 16 November 1996) is a Uruguayan professional footballer who plays as a goalkeeper for Paraguayan Primera División club Sportivo Luqueño.

== Career ==
A youth academy product of Juventud, Falcón made his professional debut on 10 April 2016 in a 0–0 draw against River Plate.

Falcón joined Boston River prior to 2018 season and became club's first-choice goalkeeper. He made his continental debut on 11 April 2018 in a 2–1 loss against Colombian side Jaguares de Córdoba.

== Career statistics ==
=== Club ===
As of 18 January 2022

Club	Season	League			Cup		Continental		Total	
Club	Season	Division	Apps	Goals	Apps	Goals	Apps	Goals	Apps	Goals
Juventud	2015–16	Uruguayan Primera División	1	0	—		0	0	1	0
Juventud	2016	Uruguayan Primera División	2	0	—		—		2	0
Juventud	2017	Uruguayan Primera División	17	0	—		—		17	0
Juventud	Total		20	0	0	0	0	0	20	0
Boston River	2018	Uruguayan Primera División	29	0	—		4 (Note: Appearances in Copa Sudamericana.)	0	33	0
Boston River	2019	Uruguayan Primera División	36	0	—		—		36	0
Boston River	2020	Uruguayan Primera División	36	0	—		—		36	0
Boston River	2021	Uruguayan Primera División	30	0	—		—		30	0
Boston River	Total		131	0	0	0	4	0	135	0
L.D.U. Quito	2022	Ecuadorian Serie A	15	0	1	0	8	0	24	0
Career total			151	0	0	0	4	0	179	0
