= Bruno Cabrera =

Argentine footballer (born 1997)

Personal information
- Full name: Bruno Leonel Cabrera
- Date of birth: 28 April 1997 (age 29)
- Place of birth: La Plata, Argentina
- Height: 1.84 m (6 ft 0 in)
- Position: Centre-back

Team information
- Current team: Newell's Old Boys
- Number: 25

Youth career
- 2006–2018: Estudiantes LP

Senior career*
| Years | Team | Apps | (Gls) |
| 2018–2020 | Estudiantes LP | 0 | (0) |
| 2019–2020 | → Círculo Deportivo (loan) | 15 | (3) |
| 2020–2022 | Barracas Central | 38 | (3) |
| 2022–2023 | Nacional Asunción | 25 | (0) |
| 2023–2026 | Coquimbo Unido | 52 | (8) |
| 2026– | Newell's Old Boys | 6 | (0) |
- * Club domestic league appearances and goals as of 17:31, 8 May 2026 (UTC)

Bruno Leonel Cabrera (born 28 April 1997) is an Argentine professional footballer who plays as a centre-back for Newell's Old Boys.

== Club career ==
A product of Estudiantes de La Plata youth system, he signed his first professional contract in 2018 and was loaned at Círculo Deportivo from 2019 to 2020. Next he played for Barracas Central, getting the promotion to the Argentine top division in 2021.

In 2022, he moved abroad and joined Club Nacional in the Paraguayan Primera División.

In December 2022, Cabrera signed with Chilean Primera División side Coquimbo Unido and won the 2025 league title, the first one for the club.

Back in Argentina, Cabrera signed with Newell's Old Boys on 13 January 2026.

== Honours ==
Barracas Central

- Primera B Nacional: 2021

Coquimbo Unido

- Chilean Primera División: 2025

Individual

- Chilean Primera División Ideal Team: 2025
