= Álvaro Cazula =

Argentine footballer

Personal information
- Full name: Álvaro Gastón Cazula
- Date of birth: 16 August 1996 (age 30)
- Place of birth: Salta, Argentina
- Height: 1.82 m (6 ft 0 in)
- Position: Defender

Team information
- Current team: San Marcos

Youth career
- Gimnasia y Tiro

Senior career*
Years	Team	Apps	(Gls)
2013–2019	Gimnasia y Tiro	57	(5)
2019–2023	Gimnasia de Jujuy	58	(1)
2022	→ Macará (loan)	26	(1)
2024	Deportes Copiapó	11	(0)
2024–2025	San Miguel	14	(0)
2026–	San Marcos	0	(0)
- * Club domestic league appearances and goals as of 16:53, 17 August 2025 (UTC)

Álvaro Gastón Cazula (born 16 August 1996) is an Argentine footballer who plays as a defender for Chilean club San Marcos de Arica.

== Club career ==
Born in Salta, Argentina, Cazula started his career with Gimnasia y Tiro in his hometown. When the club was in the 2013–14 Torneo Argentino A, he was promoted to the first team by Salvador Ragusa, and made his debut in the 1–0 win against Chaco For Ever on 1 December of the same year.

In 2019, he signed with Gimnasia y Esgrima de Jujuy in the Primera Nacional under Marcelo Herrera. In 2022, he moved abroad and joined Macará in the Ecuadorian top division on a one-year loan.

In 2024, Cazula moved to Chile and signed with Deportes Copiapó in the Chilean Primera División. In the second half of the same year, he returned to Argentina and joined San Miguel.

Back to Chile, Cazula joined San Marcos de Arica for the 2026 season.
