= Daniel Martínez (guitarist) =

Spanish flamenco guitarist (born 1993)

Daniel Martinez
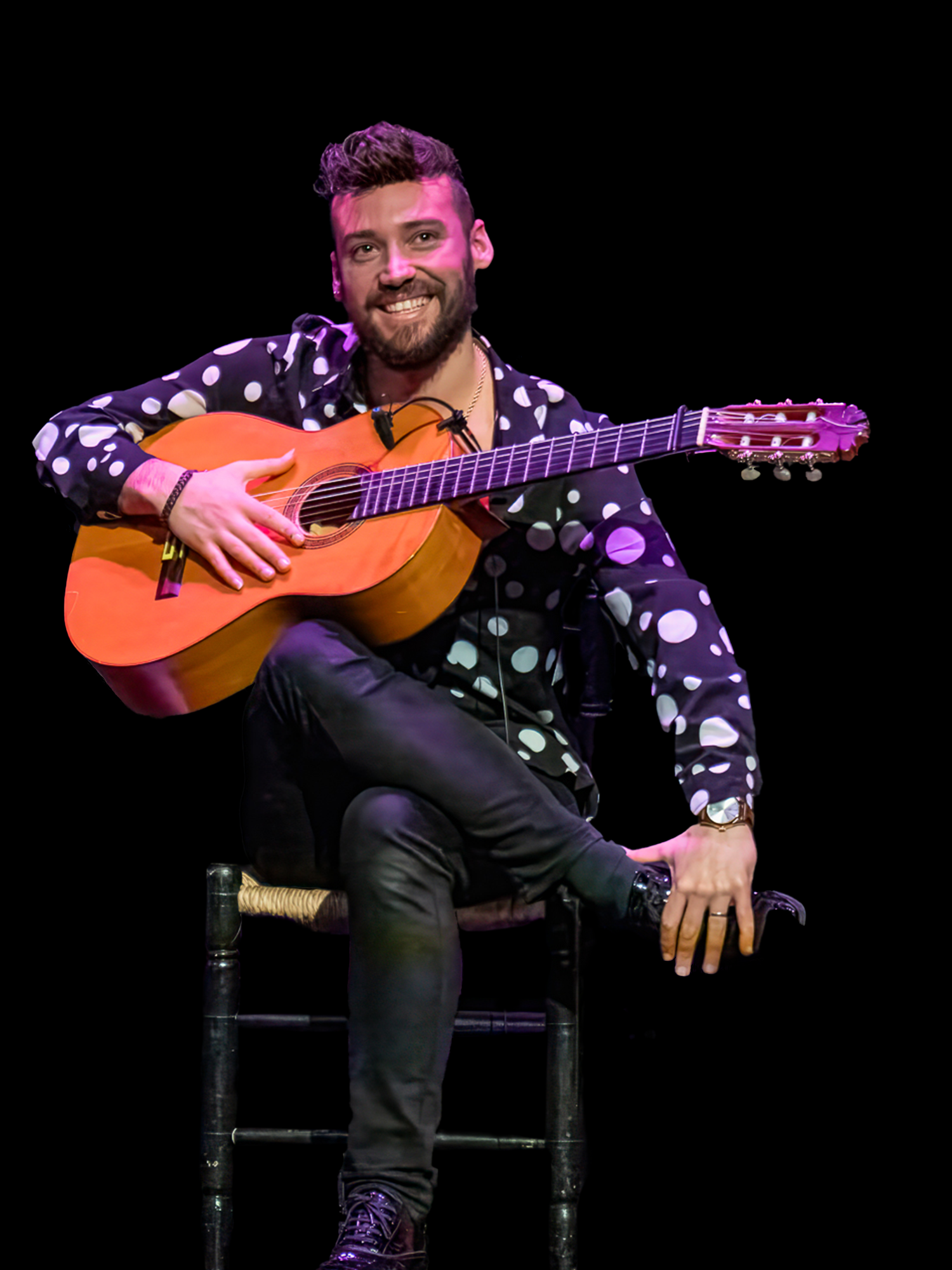

Background information
- Born: July 19, 1993 (age 32); Córdoba, Spain
- Genres: Flamenco
- Occupations: Guitarist, composer
- Instrument: Flamenco guitar
- Years active: 2015–present
- Member of: Daniel Martinez Flamenco Company
- Website: danielmartinezflamenco.com

Daniel Martinez (born 19 July 1993) is a Spanish flamenco guitarist and composer based in Edinburgh, Scotland. He is the founder of the Daniel Martinez Flamenco Company and has released two albums, Art of Believing and Andalucía.

== Early life and education ==
Martinez was born in Córdoba, Spain. He began studying flamenco guitar at the age of seven at the Royal Conservatoire of Music of Córdoba. After 14 years of formal training, he graduated in 2015 with qualifications in Elementary, Professional, and Licensed Grade. He was one of the first students to achieve all three under Spain's official grading system.

== Career ==
After graduating, Martinez performed at the Edinburgh Festival Fringe and moved to Edinburgh to work as a flamenco guitar soloist. He performed with various artists and companies in musical projects and festivals across the United Kingdom, including jazz flamenco guitarist Eduardo Niebla.

In 2017, he founded the Daniel Martinez Flamenco Company and premiered his first production, Art of Believing, at the Royal Lyceum Theatre in Edinburgh. In 2019 it won the Herald Angel Award in Edinburgh International Festival.

In February 2023, Martinez premiered his second production, Andalucía, at the Usher Hall in Edinburgh. The concert sold out and attracted over 2,000 attendees. A UK tour followed in early 2024 and expanded to other countries including Ireland and Germany.

In 2025, Martinez launched a new production titled Art of Andalucía, with a focus on flamenco dance and new compositions from his forthcoming third album.

In addition to his performance career, Martinez has worked as a flamenco guitar teacher. After running a guitar school in Córdoba for over five years, he opened a school in Edinburgh.

== Discography ==
- Art of Believing (2017)
- Andalucía (2023)
