= Andrés López (footballer) =

Ecuadorian footballer (born 1993)

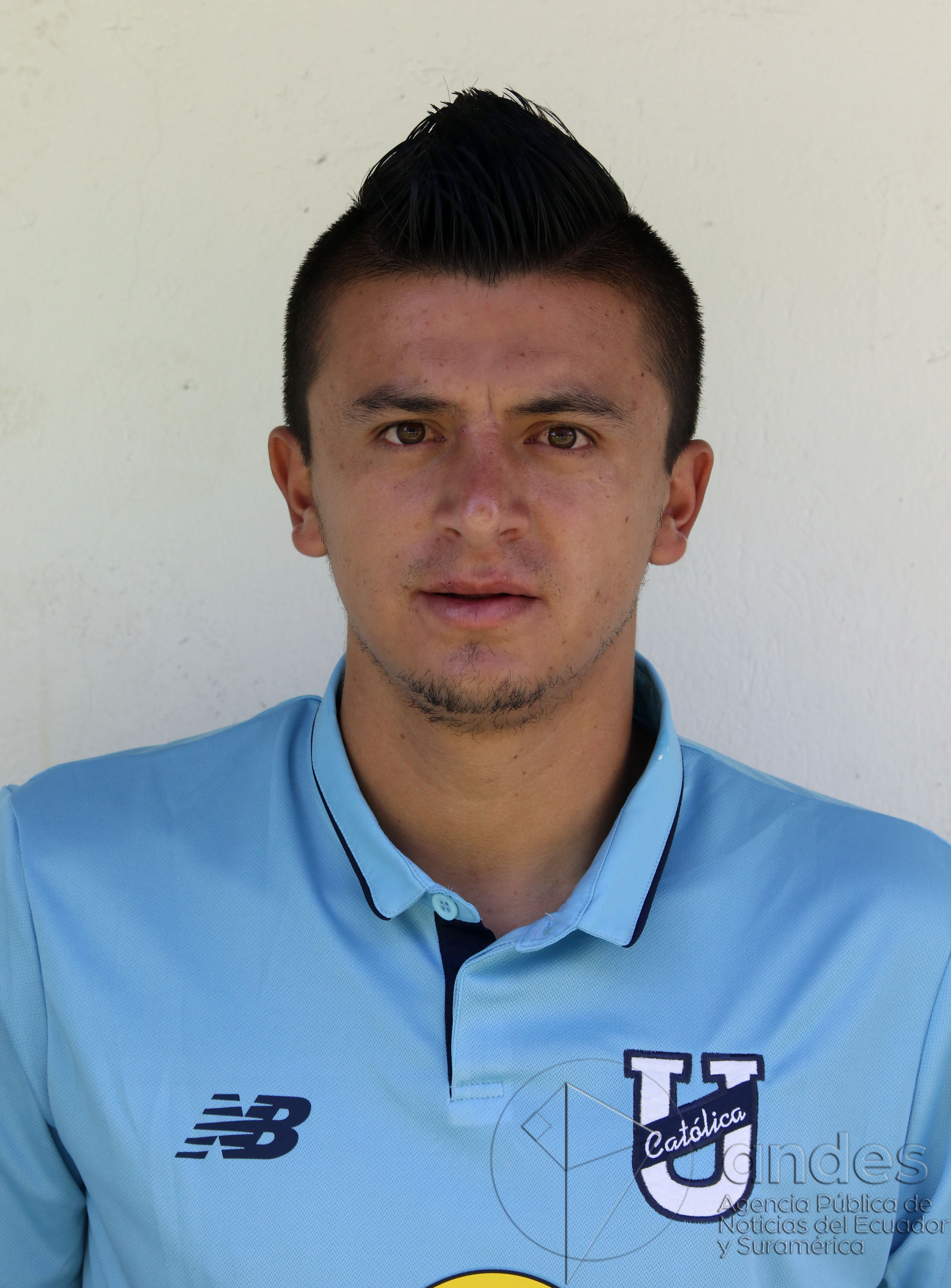
- López with Universidad Católica in February 2016

Personal information
- Full name: Marcos Andrés López Cabrera
- Date of birth: 4 February 1993 (age 33)
- Place of birth: Cuenca, Ecuador
- Height: 1.67 m (5 ft 6 in)
- Position: Defender

Team information
- Current team: Deportivo Cuenca
- Number: 25

Senior career*
Years	Team	Apps	(Gls)
2010–2016	Deportivo Cuenca	221	(11)
2016–2021	Universidad Católica	206	(17)
2022–	L.D.U. Quito	17	(0)
2023–	→ Deportivo Cuenca (loan)	79	(1)

International career^{‡}
2013	Ecuador U20	5	(0)
2017–	Ecuador	5	(0)
- * Club domestic league appearances and goals as of 20 August 2025 ‡ National team caps and goals as of 26 January 2022

Marcos Andrés López Cabrera (born 4 February 1993) is an Ecuadorian footballer who plays as a defender for Ecuadorian Serie A side C.D. Cuenca and the Ecuador national team. He made his debut for Ecuador on 6 September 2019 in a match against Peru.

He has tattoos dedicated to his brother and sister on his arm, as well as the Spanish phrase "You taught me the right way to live, I have to choose the right way to die."

== Career statistics ==
=== Club ===
As of 16 May 2025.

Club	Division	Season	League		Cup		Continental		Total	
Club	Division	Season	Apps	Goals	Apps	Goals	Apps	Goals	Apps	Goals
Deportivo Cuenca	Ecuadorian Serie A	2010	12	1	—		—		12	1
Deportivo Cuenca	Ecuadorian Serie A	2011	44	3	—		—		44	3
Deportivo Cuenca	Ecuadorian Serie A	2012	41	1	—		—		41	1
Deportivo Cuenca	Ecuadorian Serie A	2013	40	2	—		—		40	2
Deportivo Cuenca	Ecuadorian Serie A	2014	42	4	—		—		42	4
Deportivo Cuenca	Ecuadorian Serie A	2015	42	0	—		—		42	0
Universidad Católica	Ecuadorian Serie A	2016	44	1	—		2	0	46	1
Universidad Católica	Ecuadorian Serie A	2017	43	6	—		4	0	47	6
Universidad Católica	Ecuadorian Serie A	2018	44	6	0	0	0	0	44	6
Universidad Católica	Ecuadorian Serie A	2019	31	1	1	0	6	0	38	1
Universidad Católica	Ecuadorian Serie A	2020	24	2	0	0	2	0	26	2
Universidad Católica	Ecuadorian Serie A	2021	20	1	0	0	4	0	24	1
Universidad Católica	Total		206	17	1	0	18	0	225	17
L.D.U. Quito	Ecuadorian Serie A	2022	17	0	2	0	5	1	24	1
Deportivo Cuenca	Ecuadorian Serie A	2023	30	1	0	0	1	0	31	1
Deportivo Cuenca	Ecuadorian Serie A	2024	28	0	2	0	1	0	31	0
Deportivo Cuenca	Ecuadorian Serie A	2025	11	0	0	0	—		11	0
Deportivo Cuenca	Total		290	12	2	0	2	0	294	12
Career total			513	29	5	0	25	1	543	30
