= Mariano Monllor =

Argentine footballer

Personal information
- Date of birth: 28 February 1989 (age 37)
- Place of birth: Buenos Aires, Argentina
- Height: 1.85 m (6 ft 1 in)
- Position: Goalkeeper

Team information
- Current team: Acassuso

Youth career
- Vélez Sarsfield

Senior career*
Years	Team	Apps	(Gls)
2010–2013	Liniers	97	(1)
2014–2015	Dock Sud	67	(0)
2016–2018	Acassuso	1	(0)
2018–2022	Barracas Central	31	(0)
2022–2023	Defensores de Belgrano	35	(0)
2023–2024	San Martín (SJ)	36	(0)
2024	Independiente Rivadavia	2	(0)
2024–2025	Ferro Carril Oeste	10	(0)
2025–2026	Los Andes	7	(0)
2026–	Acassuso	9	(0)
- * Club domestic league appearances and goals as of 16:33, 21 April 2026 (UTC)

Mariano Monllor (born 28 February 1989) is an Argentine professional footballer who plays as a goalkeeper for Acassuso.

== Career ==
Monllor had a stint in the youth of Vélez Sarsfield. He began featuring for Primera C Metropolitana side Liniers from 2010, making ninety-seven appearances. He also scored for the club, netting a late free-kick in a draw with Dock Sud in October 2013. Monllor went on to join Dock Sud in the succeeding January. He featured sixty-seven times for them in three campaigns, as they secured a promotion play-off spot in the latter two seasons. In January 2016, Monllor switched tier four for Primera B Metropolitana by agreeing terms with Acassuso. He made his bow on 17 December versus Atlanta, replacing Julio Salvá on forty-one minutes.

July 2018 saw Monllor join Barracas Central of Primera B Metropolitana. In January 2022, Monllor moved to Defensores de Belgrano.

== Career statistics ==
As of 1 May 2019.

Appearances and goals by club, season and competition
Club	Season	League			Cup		League Cup		Continental		Other		Total	
Club	Season	Division	Apps	Goals	Apps	Goals	Apps	Goals	Apps	Goals	Apps	Goals	Apps	Goals
Acassuso	2016–17	Primera B Metropolitana	1	0	0	0	—		—		0	0	1	0
Acassuso	2017–18	Primera B Metropolitana	0	0	0	0	—		—		0	0	0	0
Acassuso	Total		1	0	0	0	—		—		0	0	1	0
Barracas Central	2018–19	Primera B Metropolitana	0	0	0	0	—		—		0	0	0	0
Career total			1	0	0	0	—		—		0	0	1	0
