= Daniel Martínez (footballer, born 1991) =

Uruguayan footballer (born 1991)

Personal information
- Full name: Daniel Enrique Martínez Bravo
- Date of birth: 4 November 1991 (age 35)
- Place of birth: San José de Mayo, Uruguay
- Height: 1.90 m (6 ft 3 in)
- Position: Forward

Senior career*
Years	Team	Apps	(Gls)
2011–2012	Bella Vista	0	(0)
2013	Plaza Colonia	6	(3)
- * Club domestic league appearances and goals as of 20:28, 28 April 2018 (UTC)

Daniel Enrique Martínez Bravo (born 4 November 1991) is a Uruguayan footballer who plays as a forward. He is currently a free agent.

== Career ==
Martínez began his career in Uruguay with Bella Vista. He appeared once for the first-team, in a 2011 Copa Sudamericana first round second leg defeat to Universidad Católica. He departed the club in 2012 before signing for Plaza Colonia, for whom he scored three goals for in six matches.

== Career statistics ==
As of 28 April 2018.

Club statistics
Club	Season	League			Cup (Note: Includes the Copa Argentina)		League Cup		Continental (Note: Includes the Copa Sudamericana)		Other		Total	
Club	Season	Division	Apps	Goals	Apps	Goals	Apps	Goals	Apps	Goals	Apps	Goals	Apps	Goals
Bella Vista	2011–12	Primera División	0	0	—		—		1 (Note: One appearance in 2011 Copa Sudamericana)	0	0	0	1	0
Plaza Colonia	2012–13	Segunda División	6	3	—		—		—		0	0	6	3
Career total			6	3	—		—		1	0	0	0	7	3
