= Estadio Fragata Presidente Sarmiento =

Football stadium in Isidro Casanova, Argentina

Coordinates: 34°41′42″S 58°35′13″W

Fragata Presidente Sarmiento Stadium
- Estadio Fragata Presidente Sarmiento
- Estadio de Almirante Brown
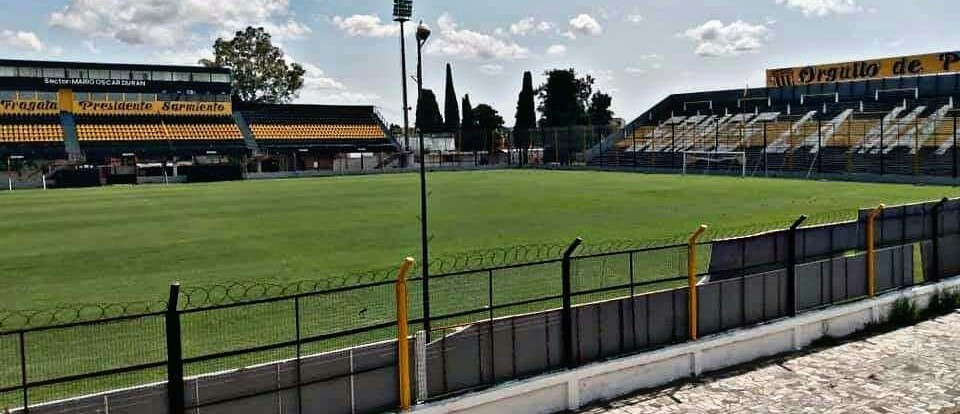
- View of the stadium in 2020
- Interactive map of Fragata Presidente Sarmiento Stadium
- Address: San Justo; Argentina
- Owner: Club Almirante Brown
- Operator: Club Almirante Brown
- Capacity: 26,000
- Type: Stadium
- Field size: 105 x 68 m
- Current use: Football

Construction
- Opened: 14 June 1969; 57 years ago
- Expanded: 1978, 1979, 2007

Tenant
- Almirante Brown (1969–present)

Estadio Fragata Presidente Sarmiento is a football stadium. It's situated at the westernmost part of San Justo, marking the transition with the nearby town of Isidro Casanova in La Matanza Partido, Argentina.

The stadium is the home ground of Club Almirante Brown and has a capacity of 26,000 spectators. It was opened on 14 June 1969.

The stadium was named after Frigate ARA Presidente Sarmiento, the first training ship of Argentina. Built in the United Kingdom, the ship made its inaugural trip in 1898. The frigate served from 1899 to 1939 and made 37 trips around the world. Repurposed as a museum since December 1961, it was declared National Historic Monument of Argentina one year later. Nowadays the frigate is moored in the Puerto Madero district of Buenos Aires.

== History ==
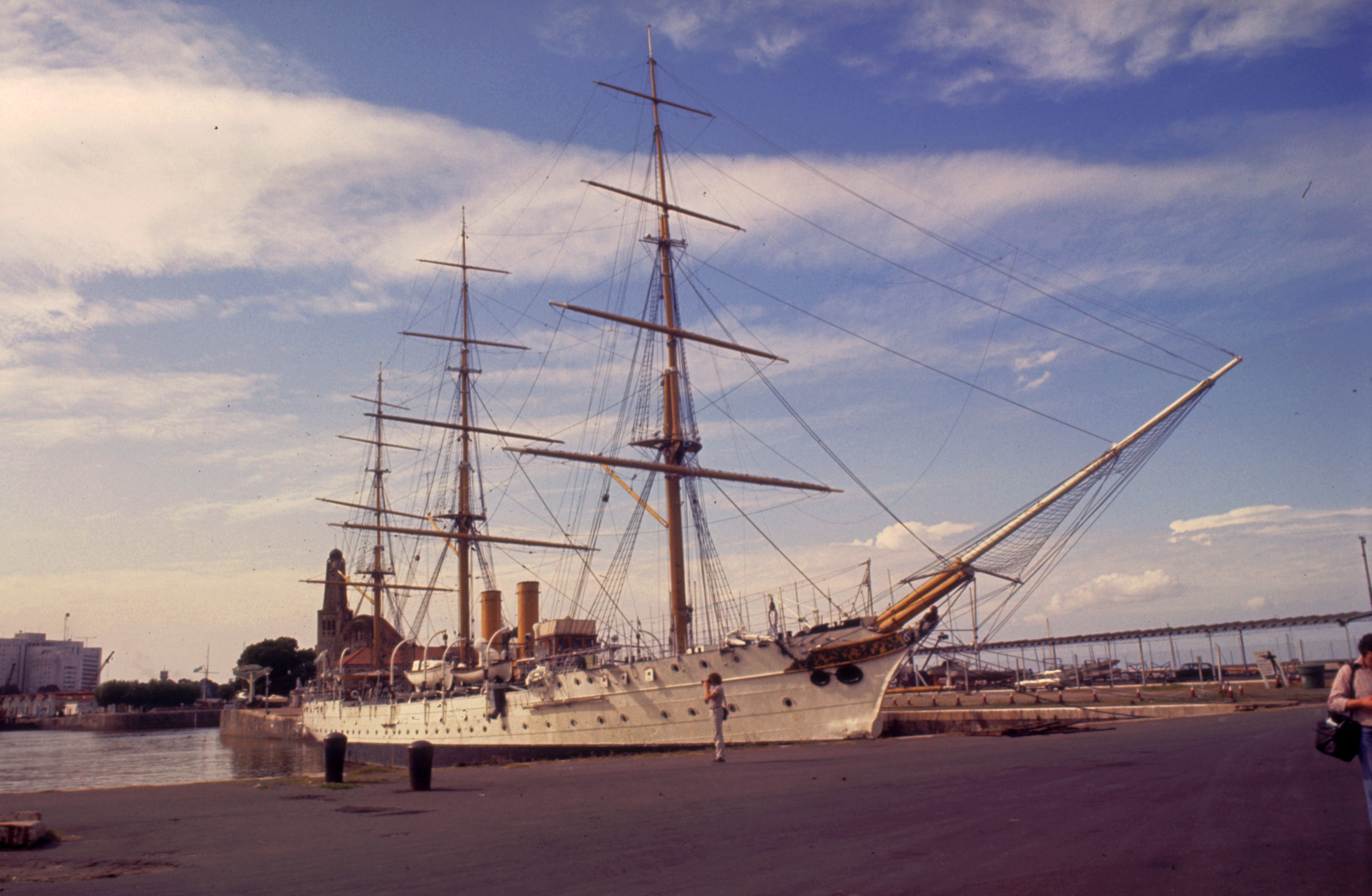
The stadium was named after Frigate ARA Presidente Sarmiento (pictured in 2005)

In the late 1960s, Almirante Brown needed to resolve the lack of a football stadium in order to meet the requirements of the Argentine Football Association to maintain its home status, since the club's stadium at Villa Sahores neighborhood did not meet those exigences from the Association, and there was no space to expand it. On March 31, 1968, the foundation stone was laid for the first stage of construction of the stadium.

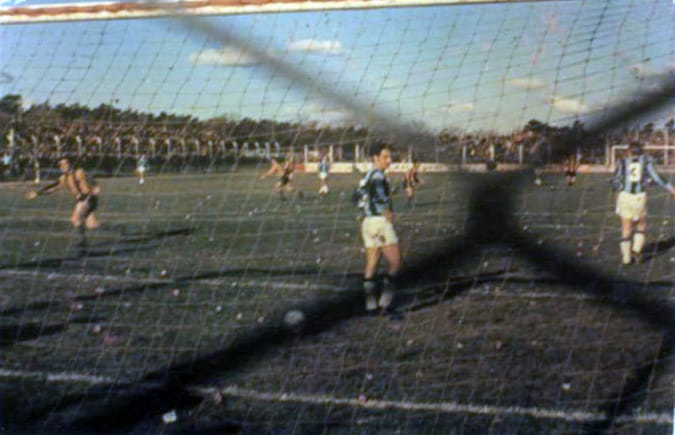
Almirante Brown (2) v San Telmo (3), inauguration of Estadio Fragata Presidente Sarmiento in June 1969

The official inauguration was on 14 June 1969, when Almirante Brown was defeated by San Telmo 3–2 in the 14th. fixture of Primera B championship. The stadium had four wooden stands of 11 steps each, brought from the club's old stadium and distributed as follows: two stands behind the goals (end stands) about 70 meters long, and two more about 30 meters long each, on either side of the old changing rooms, now covered by the central concrete side wall.

On August 17, 1970, with a 2–0 victory against Vélez Sársfield, the first 1,000 seats made entirely of concrete were inaugurated on the side opposite the changing rooms. Then, on March 14, 1979, a night match was held against River Plate to inaugurate another 1,500 concrete seats, also built asymmetrically, divided into two sections on the home side and one on the away side. In 1976, the 40-meter-long, 72-step concrete side stand, located above the locker rooms, was inaugurated, with a capacity of approximately 6,100 people. In 1978, a 13-meter-long concrete away section, also with 72 steps, was added to the left side of the stadium, with a capacity of about 2,000 people. To make room for this, the old wooden stand in that section was removed, disrupting the stadium's symmetry to this day. This stand is opened to the public for important matches, but is generally used by visiting team officials and their associates. That same year, the stadium's floodlights (which have since been changed several times in both their design and location) were inaugurated during a night match against Boca Juniors.

In 2007, construction began on the first section, 37 meters long and with 52 steps, in the south stand to host visiting fans. The work was completed that same year. Immediately afterward, works began on the north stand for home fans, following the same symmetrical design. Finally, in accordance with new regulations requiring the complete elimination of wood in stadiums in the province of Buenos Aires, the old planks brought from the Matheu and Almafuerte stadium were removed in 2008, and the north end stand for home fans was completed. It is 74 meters long and has 52 steps, with an approximate capacity of 8,500 spectators. On September 10, 2009, after 5 years since its last use, the works were completed so that it could be used again.

In July 2019, the Mario Oscar Durán boxes were inaugurated, being named after one of the most notable presidents in the history of the club. Press boxes were also inaugurated that day.
