= Salvador Ragusa =

Spanish football manager

Personal information
- Full name: Salvador Armando Ragusa
- Date of birth: 14 April 1945 (age 81)

Managerial career
- Years: Team
- 1989: Central Córdoba de Rosario
- 1989–1991: Gimnasia de Jujuy
- 1991–1992: Instituto de Córdoba
- 1992–1993: Gimnasia de Jujuy
- 1993–1994: Talleres de Córdoba
- 1994: Central Córdoba de Rosario
- 1995: Juventud Antoniana
- 1995: Chaco For Ever
- 1996: Gimnasia y Tiro
- 1997: Guabirá
- 1997: Atlético Tucumán
- 1998: Blooming
- 1998–1999: San Martín de Mendoza
- 1999: Gimnasia y Tiro
- 2000: Tiro Federal
- 2000: Guabirá
- 2001: Luján de Cuyo
- 2001: Racing de Córdoba
- 2001–2002: Aucas
- 2002: Tungurahua
- 2003: Deportivo Cuenca
- 2004: Atlanta
- 2004: San Martín de San Juan
- 2005: Olmedo
- 2006: Gimnasia y Tiro
- 2007–2008: ESPOLI
- 2009: Deportivo Azogues
- 2009: Herediano
- 2010: UT Cotopaxi
- 2010: Gimnasia y Tiro
- 2011: Gimnasia de Jujuy
- 2012: Racing de Olavarría
- 2012–2013: Central Córdoba de Rosario
- 2014: Gimnasia y Tiro
- 2015: General Paz Juniors
- 2016: Juventud Antoniana (youth)
- 2016–2017: Concepción
- 2017–2018: Club Jorge Newbery
- 2018–2019: San Martín de Formosa
- 2020–2021: Altos Hornos Zapla

Salvador Armando Ragusa (born 14 April 1945) is an Argentine football manager.

He managed clubs in Argentina, Bolivia, Ecuador as well as Herediano in Costa Rica.

He hails from Rosario. While being a fan of Rosario Central, he started his manager career in Central Córdoba de Rosario in 1989. Ragusa also spent several years managing clubs in Córdoba including Instituto, Talleres and Racing. Among others, he led Talleres to promotion from the 1993–94 Primera B Nacional, but left thereafter due to disagreements with "the leaders".

Taking over Altos Hornos Zapla during the COVID-19 pandemic in Argentina, Ragusa claimed that he was attacked by barras bravas members in the winter of 2021. "Never in my life have they come to press me at my home with knives", Ragusa stated to Channel 4, but he "decided to stay at the club until the tournament was over".
