= Fernando González (footballer, born 1988) =

Argentine professional footballer

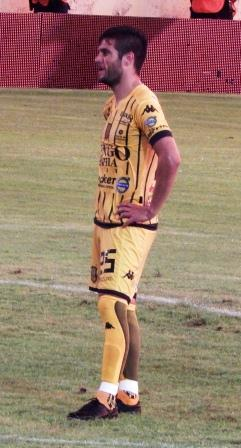
- Fernando Gonzalez

Personal information
- Full name: Fernando Javier González
- Date of birth: 25 September 1988 (age 38)
- Place of birth: Beruti, Argentina
- Height: 1.78 m (5 ft 10 in)
- Position: Left-back

Team information
- Current team: Ferrocarril Midland

Youth career
- Belgrano

Senior career*
Years	Team	Apps	(Gls)
2009–2012	Belgrano	17	(0)
2012–2014	Sarmiento	38	(0)
2014	San Martín SJ	14	(0)
2015	Temperley	6	(0)
2016	Olimpo	4	(0)
2016–2017	Douglas Haig	31	(0)
2017	Estudiantes	3	(0)
2018–2022	Barracas Central	110	(2)
2022–2023	San Martín Tucumán	14	(0)
2023–2024	Atlanta	33	(2)
2024–2025	Racing Córdoba	34	(0)
2025–2026	Güemes	30	(0)
2026–	Ferrocarril Midland	10	(0)
- * Club domestic league appearances and goals as of 16:50, 28 April 2026 (UTC)

Fernando Javier González (born 25 September 1988) is an Argentine professional footballer who plays as a left-back for Ferrocarril Midland.

== Career ==
Belgrano were González's opening senior team. After making his professional debut on 13 March 2009 against Chacarita Juniors, González made sixteen appearances in three Primera B Nacional seasons on the way to helping the club win promotion to the Primera División in 2010–11. He featured just once in the top-flight, before returning to tier two with Sarmiento in June 2012. He played thirty-eight times for them. Short stints with San Martín, as he won promotion, Temperley and Olimpo followed, with the latter two coming in the Primera División. Primera B Nacional's Douglas Haig signed González in 2016; where he'd suffer relegation.

González moved across to the other third division in 2017, agreeing terms with Estudiantes. He participated in three fixtures in Torneo Federal A, appearing twice against Unión Aconquija and once versus Deportivo Maipú. A return to Primera B Metropolitana was completed in 2018, with Barracas Central becoming his eighth club. He scored his first senior goal with them, netting in a 1–1 draw with San Miguel on 29 April 2019.

On 12 January 2022, González joined San Martín de Tucumán on a one-year deal.

== Career statistics ==
As of 1 May 2019.

Appearances and goals by club, season and competition
Club	Season	League			Cup		League Cup		Continental		Other		Total	
Club	Season	Division	Apps	Goals	Apps	Goals	Apps	Goals	Apps	Goals	Apps	Goals	Apps	Goals
Belgrano	2008–09	Primera B Nacional	3	0	0	0	—		—		0	0	3	0
Belgrano	2009–10	Primera B Nacional	4	0	0	0	—		—		0	0	4	0
Belgrano	2010–11	Primera B Nacional	9	0	0	0	—		—		0	0	9	0
Belgrano	2011–12	Primera División	1	0	2	0	—		—		0	0	3	0
Belgrano	Total		17	0	2	0	—		—		0	0	19	0
Sarmiento	2012–13	Primera B Nacional	16	0	0	0	—		—		0	0	16	0
Sarmiento	2013–14	Primera B Nacional	22	0	0	0	—		—		0	0	22	0
Sarmiento	Total		38	0	0	0	—		—		0	0	38	0
San Martín	2014	Primera B Nacional	14	0	0	0	—		—		0	0	14	0
Temperley	2015	Primera División	6	0	0	0	—		—		0	0	6	0
Olimpo	2016	Primera División	4	0	0	0	—		—		0	0	4	0
Douglas Haig	2016–17	Primera B Nacional	31	0	1	0	—		—		0	0	32	0
Estudiantes	2017–18	Torneo Federal A	3	0	0	0	—		—		0	0	3	0
Barracas Central	2017–18	Primera B Metropolitana	16	0	0	0	—		—		1 (Note: Appearance(s) in the Primera B Metropolitana play-offs)	0	17	0
Barracas Central	2018–19	Primera B Metropolitana	30	1	1	0	—		—		0	0	31	1
Barracas Central	Total		46	1	1	0	—		—		1	0	48	1
Career total			159	1	4	0	—		—		1	0	164	1

== Honours ==
Barracas Central

- Primera B Metropolitana: 2018–19
