= Rodrigo Saracho =

Argentine footballer

Personal information
- Full name: Rodrigo Emanuel Saracho
- Date of birth: 6 January 1994 (age 32)
- Place of birth: General Pacheco, Argentina
- Height: 1.93 m (6 ft 4 in)
- Position: Goalkeeper

Team information
- Current team: San Marcos
- Number: 1

Youth career
- 2008–2014: San Lorenzo

Senior career*
Years	Team	Apps	(Gls)
2015–2016	Olimpo	0	(0)
2016–2021	Estudiantes BA	80	(0)
2021	Quilmes	30	(0)
2022	Barracas Central	18	(0)
2023–2025	Godoy Cruz	1	(0)
2024	→ Ferro Carril Oeste (loan)	11	(0)
2024	→ Deportivo Riestra (loan)	0	(0)
2025	→ San Antonio Bulo Bulo (loan)	6	(0)
2026–	San Marcos	1	(0)
- * Club domestic league appearances and goals as of 15 April 2026

Rodrigo Emanuel Saracho (born 6 January 1994) is an Argentine footballer who plays as a goalkeeper for Chilean club San Marcos de Arica.

== Club career ==
Born in General Pacheco, Argentina, Saracho was trained at San Lorenzo de Almagro.

In 2015, Saracho signed with Olimpo. The next year, he switched to Estudiantes de Buenos Aires until 2021.

After playing for Quilmes in 2021 and Barracas Central in 2022, Saracho switched to Godoy Cruz in 2023. He had stints on loan with Ferro Carril Oeste, Deportivo Riestra and the Bolivian club San Antonio Bulo Bulo.

In January 2026, Saracho moved to Chile and joined San Marcos de Arica.
