= Lucas Colitto =

Argentine footballer

Personal information
- Full name: Lucas Andrés Colitto
- Date of birth: 1 June 1994 (age 32)
- Place of birth: San Martín, Buenos Aires, Argentina
- Height: 1.72 m (5 ft 8 in)
- Position: Winger

Team information
- Current team: Cusco FC
- Number: 22

Youth career
- 2011–2012: Defensores

Senior career*
Years	Team	Apps	(Gls)
2012–2014	Defensores	62	(2)
2014–2015	Arouca	6	(0)
2015–2016	→ Unión (loan)	0	(0)
2016	→ Defensores (loan)	11	(0)
2016–2017	Herediano	8	(0)
2017	Gualaceo		
2017–2018	Fénix	28	(5)
2018–2019	Atlanta	32	(5)
2019–2021	Barracas Central	58	(5)
2022-2023	Cuenca	58	(5)
2023-2024	Barracas Central	15	(0)
2024-	Cusco FC	63	(10)
- * Club domestic league appearances and goals as of 1 December 2025

Lucas Andrés Colitto (born 1 June 1994) is an Argentine professional footballer who plays as a winger for Cusco FC.

== Career ==
Born in San Martín, Buenos Aires, Colitto began his career with Defensores de Belgrano. He made his professional debut on the 4 August 2012, in away fixture against Atlanta. Colitto would score his first goal for Defensores de Belgrano on the 27 October 2012, against Flandria.

In the summer of 2014, Colitto left the Buenos Aires outfit to join Portuguese side F.C. Arouca. Colitto debuted for the Arouquenses on the 31 August 2014 in a 2–0 away loss to C.D. Nacional.

== Career statistics ==
As of 24 May 2024

Appearances and goals by club, season and competition
Club	Season	League		Cup		Continental		Total	
Club	Season	Apps	Goals	Apps	Goals	Apps	Goals	Apps	Goals
Defensores de Belgrano	2012-13	31	2	0	0	–		31	2
Defensores de Belgrano	2013-14	31	0	1	0	–		32	0
Defensores de Belgrano	Total	62	2	1	0	0	0	63	2
Arouca	2014-15	6	0	2	0	–		8	0
Unión	2015	0	0	–		–		0	0
Defensores de Belgrano (loan)	2016	11	0	–		–		11	0
Herediano	2016	8	0	–		1	0	9	0
Gualaceo	2017	12	0	–		–		12	0
Fénix	2017-18	28	5	–		–		28	5
Atlanta	2018-19	32	5	1	0	–		33	5
Barracas Central	2019-20	18	0	–		–		18	0
Barracas Central	2020	5	0	–		–		5	0
Barracas Central	2021	35	5	–		–		35	5
Barracas Central	2023	15	0	8	1	–		23	1
Barracas Central	Total	73	5	8	1	0	0	81	6
Deportivo Cuenca	2022	28	1	1	0	–		29	1
Cusco FC	2024	16	3	–		–		16	3
Career total		276	21	13	1	1	0	290	22
