= Gonzalo Paz =

Argentine professional footballer

Personal information
- Full name: Gonzalo Ezequiel Paz
- Date of birth: 6 June 1993 (age 33)
- Place of birth: Morón, Argentina
- Height: 1.78 m (5 ft 10 in)
- Position: Left-back

Team information
- Current team: Nueva Chicago

Youth career
- 2002–2011: Chacarita Juniors
- 2011: Universidad Católica
- 2012–2013: Deportivo Armenio

Senior career*
Years	Team	Apps	(Gls)
2013–2020	Deportivo Armenio	93	(0)
2017	→ El Linqueño (loan)	10	(0)
2018	→ Stade Nyonnais (loan)	–	(–)
2018–2019	→ Barracas Central (loan)	4	(0)
2020	Sacachispas	4	(0)
2021–2023	Barracas Central	55	(2)
2023	Levadiakos	12	(0)
2023–2024	Atlético Tucumán	6	(0)
2024–2026	Deportes Limache	37	(0)
2026–	Nueva Chicago	4	(0)

International career
2016	Argentina U23		
- * Club domestic league appearances and goals as of 16:56, 13 April 2026 (UTC)

Gonzalo Ezequiel Paz (born 6 June 1993) is an Argentine professional footballer who plays as a left-back for Primera Nacional club Nueva Chicago.

== Club career ==
Paz played for the Chacarita Juniors academy from the age of nine, before joining Universidad Católica in Chile in 2011. A year later, Deportivo Armenio signed Paz. He made his debut as a late substitute in a Primera B Metropolitana victory away to Tristán Suárez on 22 September 2013, with his first start arriving on 17 November against Flandria. He featured eight times in 2013–14, placing fourteenth. Sixty-eight appearances followed in four seasons, twenty-six of which came in Primera C Metropolitana following 2016 relegation. In 2017, Paz was loaned to Torneo Federal B's El Linqueño; featuring in ten games.

Paz joined Swiss Promotion League side Stade Nyonnais on loan in 2018. On 11 July 2018, after returning from Switzerland's third tier, Paz joined his homeland's equivalent after agreeing terms with Barracas Central. His first appearances arrived within the next three months versus Comunicaciones and Atlanta respectively.

In June 2024, Paz moved to Chile and signed with Deportes Limache in the Primera B. He left them at the end of 2025.

== International career ==
In 2016, Paz was called up to the Argentina U23s by Julio Olarticoechea ahead of the Sait Nagjee Trophy in India.

== Career statistics ==
As of 2 May 2019.

Appearances and goals by club, season and competition
Club	Season	League			Cup		League Cup		Continental		Other		Total	
Club	Season	Division	Apps	Goals	Apps	Goals	Apps	Goals	Apps	Goals	Apps	Goals	Apps	Goals
Deportivo Armenio	2013–14	Primera B Metropolitana	8	0	1	0	—		—		0	0	9	0
Deportivo Armenio	2014	Primera B Metropolitana	12	0	1	0	—		—		0	0	13	0
Deportivo Armenio	2015	Primera B Metropolitana	16	0	0	0	—		—		0	0	16	0
Deportivo Armenio	2016	Primera B Metropolitana	13	0	0	0	—		—		0	0	13	0
Deportivo Armenio	2016–17	Primera C Metropolitana	26	0	0	0	—		—		0	0	26	0
Deportivo Armenio	2017–18	Primera C Metropolitana	0	0	0	0	—		—		0	0	0	0
Deportivo Armenio	2018–19	Primera C Metropolitana	0	0	0	0	—		—		0	0	0	0
Deportivo Armenio	Total		75	0	2	0	—		—		0	0	77	0
El Linqueño (loan)	2017–18	Torneo Federal B	10	0	0	0	—		—		0	0	10	0
Barracas Central (loan)	2018–19	Primera B Metropolitana	3	0	0	0	—		—		0	0	3	0
Career total			88	0	2	0	—		—		0	0	90	0

== Honours ==
Barracas Central

- Primera B Metropolitana: 2018–19
