= Eric Ahumada =

Chilean footballer (born 1994)

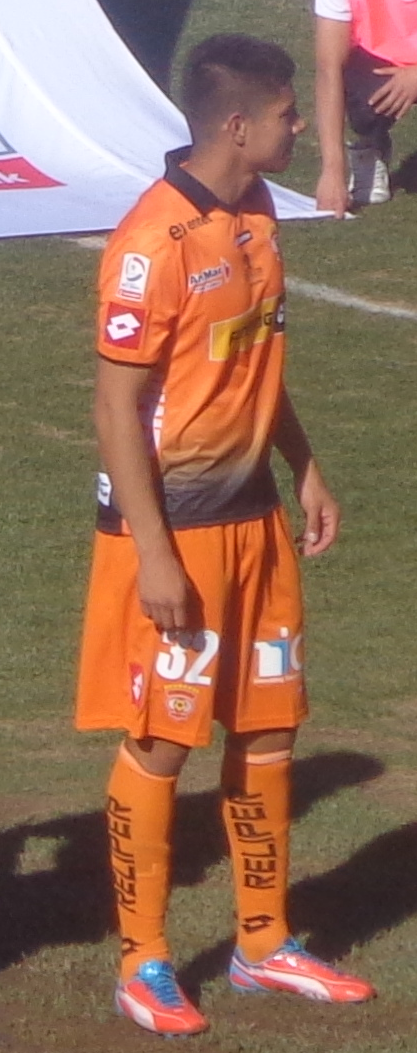
- Ahumada with Cobreloa in 2015

Personal information
- Full name: Eric Andrés Ahumada Escobar
- Date of birth: 14 February 1994 (age 32)
- Place of birth: Tierra Amarilla, Chile
- Height: 1.84 m (6 ft 1/2 in)
- Position: Centre-back

Youth career
- Cobreloa

Senior career*
Years	Team	Apps	(Gls)
2014–2017	Cobreloa	52	(0)
2017–2018	Huachipato	0	(0)
2018	→ Magallanes (loan)	0	(0)
2019	Iberia	12	(0)
2020–2021	Cobreloa	23	(1)
2021–2022	Deportes Antofagasta	17	(0)
2023–2024	Universidad de Concepción	9	(0)
2024	Deportes Rengo	10	(0)
Total		123	(1)
- * Club domestic league appearances and goals

Eric Andrés Ahumada Escobar (born 14 February 1994) is a Chilean former footballer who played as a centre-back.

== Career ==
Ahumada was trained at Cobreloa.

Ahumada last played for Deportes Rengo in the Segunda División Profesional de Chile in 2024. He announced his retirement in March 2025.
