= Carlos Arce (footballer, born 1990) =

Argentine professional footballer

Personal information
- Full name: Carlos Alfredo Arce
- Date of birth: 16 September 1990 (age 36)
- Place of birth: Buenos Aires, Argentina
- Height: 1.69 m (5 ft 7 in)
- Position: Midfielder

Team information
- Current team: Barracas Central
- Number: 17

Youth career
- Barracas Central

Senior career*
Years	Team	Apps	(Gls)
2009–	Barracas Central	390	(13)
2024	→ Atlanta (loan)	11	(0)
2025	→ Los Andes (loan)	17	(0)
- * Club domestic league appearances and goals as of 17:12, 16 February 2026 (UTC)

Carlos Alfredo Arce (born 16 September 1990) is an Argentine professional footballer who plays as a midfielder for Barracas Central.

== Career ==
Arce began his career with Barracas Central. He started featuring at senior level from 2009 in Primera C Metropolitana, making forty-six appearances across the 2008–09 and 2009–10 seasons; with the latter concluding with promotion to Primera B Metropolitana. His first goals in the third tier came in 2010–11 as he netted against Comunicaciones and Atlanta. After nine campaigns in the division, as he took his overall tally for the club to nine goals in three hundred and eleven matches, Barracas Central were promoted to Primera B Nacional as champions in 2018–19.

== Career statistics ==
As of 5 July 2020.

Appearances and goals by club, season and competition
Club	Season	League			Cup		League Cup		Continental		Other		Total	
Club	Season	Division	Apps	Goals	Apps	Goals	Apps	Goals	Apps	Goals	Apps	Goals	Apps	Goals
Barracas Central	2012–13	Primera B Metropolitana	18	0	0	0	—		—		0	0	18	0
Barracas Central	2013–14	Primera B Metropolitana	39	1	1	0	—		—		0	0	40	1
Barracas Central	2014	Primera B Metropolitana	20	0	0	0	—		—		1 (Note: Appearance(s) in the Primera B Metropolitana play-offs)	0	21	0
Barracas Central	2015	Primera B Metropolitana	31	3	1	0	—		—		1	0	33	3
Barracas Central	2016	Primera B Metropolitana	16	1	0	0	—		—		0	0	16	1
Barracas Central	2016–17	Primera B Metropolitana	31	1	0	0	—		—		1	0	32	1
Barracas Central	2017–18	Primera B Metropolitana	29	0	0	0	—		—		1	0	30	0
Barracas Central	2018–19	Primera B Metropolitana	35	1	1	0	—		—		0	0	36	1
Barracas Central	2019–20	Primera B Nacional	16	1	1	0	—		—		0	0	17	1
Career total			235	8	4	0	—		—		4	0	243	8

== Honours ==
Barracas Central

- Primera C Metropolitana: 2009–10
- Primera B Metropolitana: 2018–19
