= Daniel Martínez (footballer, born 1997) =

Argentine footballer (born 1997)

Personal information
- Full name: Enzo Daniel Martínez
- Date of birth: 17 January 1997 (age 29)
- Place of birth: San Miguel, Argentina
- Height: 1.73 m (5 ft 8 in)
- Position: Left-back

Team information
- Current team: Barracas Central
- Number: 28

Youth career
- River Plate

Senior career*
Years	Team	Apps	(Gls)
2016–2017	River Plate	0	(0)
2016–2017	→ Estudiantes (loan)	17	(1)
2017–2018	Independiente	0	(0)
2020–	Barracas Central	17	(0)
- * Club domestic league appearances and goals as of 20:51, 22 March 2022 (UTC)

Enzo Daniel Martínez (born 17 January 1997) is an Argentine professional footballer who plays as a left-back for Barracas Central.

== Career ==
Martínez's career began with River Plate; he never featured for the first team but did represent the U20s at the 2016 U-20 Copa Libertadores in Paraguay, making two appearances. On 9 February 2017, Martínez was loaned to Estudiantes of Primera B Nacional. He subsequently scored one goal, versus Central Córdoba, in seventeen appearances. He returned to River Plate in July, prior to being let go in August to join Independiente. He departed in mid-2018 having not appeared at first-team level, though was an unused substitute for a league match with Arsenal de Sarandí in December 2017.

In the summer of 2020, Martínez joined Barracas Central.

== Career statistics ==
As of 8 July 2020.

Club statistics
Club	Season	League			Cup		League Cup		Continental		Other		Total	
Club	Season	Division	Apps	Goals	Apps	Goals	Apps	Goals	Apps	Goals	Apps	Goals	Apps	Goals
River Plate	2016–17	Primera División	0	0	0	0	—		0	0	0	0	0	0
Estudiantes (loan)	2016–17	Primera B Nacional	17	1	—		—		—		0	0	17	1
Independiente	2017–18	Primera División	0	0	0	0	—		0	0	0	0	0	0
Career total			17	1	0	0	—		0	0	0	0	17	1
