= Tomás Molina =

Argentine footballer

Personal information
- Full name: Tomás Martín Molina
- Date of birth: 12 April 1995 (age 31)
- Place of birth: Pilar, Argentina
- Height: 1.83 m (6 ft 0 in)
- Position: Forward

Team information
- Current team: Argentinos Juniors
- Number: 27

Youth career
- Huracán

Senior career*
Years	Team	Apps	(Gls)
2016–2019	Huracán	4	(0)
2018–2019	→ Almirante Brown (loan)	39	(4)
2019–2020	Brown de Adrogué	21	(5)
2020–2021	Ferro Carril Oeste	30	(10)
2022	LDU Quito	27	(13)
2023	Juárez	13	(4)
2023–2024	Talleres	5	(0)
2024	→ Central Córdoba SdE (loan)	17	(5)
2024–	Argentinos Juniors	58	(16)
- * Club domestic league appearances and goals as of 17:30, 10 July 2026 (UTC)

Tomás Martín Molina (born 12 April 1995) is an Argentine professional footballer who plays as a forward for Argentinos Juniors.

== Career ==
Molina started his career with Huracán. His professional debut came on 27 February 2016 in a 1–1 draw with San Lorenzo. Three more appearances followed in 2016 and 2016–17, prior to Molina leaving on loan in January 2018 to join Primera B Metropolitana side Almirante Brown. He featured for Almirante Brown for the first time on 27 January versus Comunicaciones.

== Career statistics ==
As of 27 May 2018.

Club statistics
Club	Season	League			Cup (Note: Includes the Copa Argentina)		League Cup		Continental (Note: Includes the Copa Libertadores and Copa Sudamericana)		Other		Total	
Club	Season	Division	Apps	Goals	Apps	Goals	Apps	Goals	Apps	Goals	Apps	Goals	Apps	Goals
Huracán	2016	Primera División	2	0	0	0	—		0	0	0	0	2	0
Huracán	2016–17	Primera División	2	0	0	0	—		0	0	0	0	2	0
Huracán	2017–18	Primera División	0	0	0	0	—		0	0	0	0	0	0
Huracán	Total		4	0	0	0	—		0	0	0	0	4	0
Almirante Brown (loan)	2017–18	Primera B Metropolitana	15	0	0	0	—		—		0	0	15	0
Career total			19	0	0	0	—		0	0	0	0	19	0
