= Juan Macías (footballer) =

Ecuadorian footballer (born 2005)

Personal information
- Full name: Juan David Macías Alcívar
- Date of birth: 15 January 2005 (age 21)
- Place of birth: El Carmen, Manabí, Ecuador
- Height: 1.70 m (5 ft 7 in)
- Position: Midfielder

Team information
- Current team: Macará

Youth career
- Claudio Alcívar Soccer School
- 2016–2022: LDU Quito
- 2020: → Atlético Kin (loan)
- 2023: → São Paulo (loan)

Senior career*
Years	Team	Apps	(Gls)
2022–2024	LDU Quito	3	(0)
2023	→ São Paulo (loan)	0	(0)
2024–	→ Macará	2	(0)
- * Club domestic league appearances and goals as of 4 February 2025

Juan David Macías Alcívar (born 15 January 2005) is an Ecuadorian footballer currently playing as a midfielder for Macará.

== Club career ==
Born in El Carmen Canton in the Manabí Province of Ecuador, Macías began his footballing career at the Soccer School founded by former Ecuadorian international footballer, and Macías' uncle, Claudio Alcívar. In 2016, at the age of eleven, he joined the academy of L.D.U. Quito, and during his time in the club's youth ranks, he spent time on loan with Atlético Kin. He made his senior debut for L.D.U. Quito on 23 January 2022, scoring in the 2–1 win against Independiente del Valle in the Copa de Campeones, a friendly competition.

He made his professional debut in the Ecuadorian Serie A the following month, starting in an eventual 1–0 win against Gualaceo, before being replaced in the second half by Jefferson Arce, who would go on to score the game's only goal. In September 2022, he was named by English newspaper The Guardian as one of the best players born in 2005 worldwide.

By the end of the 2022 season, Macías began attracting the attention of a number of Brazilian clubs, with Fluminense and Internacional being touted as potential suitors. In January 2023, a bid from Fluminense fell through, with the two clubs reportedly unable to agree a deal.

In March 2023, it was announced that Macías had joined Campeonato Brasileiro Série A side São Paulo on a year-and-a-half-long loan deal with an option to buy.

== Career statistics ==
=== Club ===
As of 28 September 2022.

Appearances and goals by club, season and competition
Club	Season	League			Cup		Continental		Other		Total	
Club	Season	Division	Apps	Goals	Apps	Goals	Apps	Goals	Apps	Goals	Apps	Goals
LDU Quito	2022	Ecuadorian Serie A	3	0	0	0	0	0	0	0	3	0
LDU Quito	2023	Ecuadorian Serie A	0	0	0	0	0	0	0	0	0	0
LDU Quito	Total		3	0	0	0	0	0	0	0	3	0
São Paulo (loan)	2023	Série A	0	0	0	0	0	0	0	0	0	0
Career total			3	0	0	0	0	0	0	0	3	0
