= Juan Manuel Vázquez (footballer) =

Argentine footballer

Personal information
- Full name: Juan Manuel Vázquez
- Date of birth: 25 July 1994 (age 32)
- Place of birth: José León Suárez, Argentina
- Height: 1.83 m (6 ft 0 in)
- Positions: Midfielder; winger

Team information
- Current team: Almirante Brown

Youth career
- All Boys

Senior career*
Years	Team	Apps	(Gls)
2014–2017	All Boys	73	(8)
2018	Correcaminos UAT	5	(0)
2018	Deportivo Pasto	11	(1)
2019	Sportivo Luqueño	9	(1)
2020	Atenas	0	(0)
2020–2022	Barracas Central	65	(5)
2023	Aldosivi	9	(1)
2023	→ Almirante Brown (loan)	20	(0)
2024	Independiente Rivadavia	11	(1)
2024	Coquimbo Unido	9	(0)
2025–	Almirante Brown	17	(0)
- * Club domestic league appearances and goals as of 17:43, 30 June 2025 (UTC)

Juan Manuel Vázquez (born 25 July 1994) is an Argentine professional footballer who plays as a midfielder or winger for Almirante Brown.

== Career ==
Vázquez started his career in Argentina with All Boys. After being an unused substitute for the Primera B Nacional club in a Copa Argentina tie with Tigre in July 2014, Vázquez made his professional debut on 1 October during a match with Sarmiento; in the process netting All Boys' goal in a 1–0 win. Two goals in thirty-six further appearances followed in his first three campaigns, prior to five goals over the course of the 2016–17 Primera B Nacional as All Boys finished twelfth. Midway through the next campaign, Vázquez departed to join Ascenso MX side Correcaminos UAT. He was subsequently selected seven times in 2017–18.

Vázquez switched Mexican football for Colombian football in June 2018, with the forward agreeing to sign for Deportivo Pasto of Categoría Primera A. His first goal for Deportivo Pasto arrived during his second start, scoring the club's opening goal of a home victory over Alianza Petrolera on 23 September. January 2019 saw Vázquez head to Paraguay with Sportivo Luqueño. Nine appearances and one goal, versus Deportivo Santaní, followed in the Primera División. He departed midway through the year, following a contractual dispute between him and the club; claiming he was owed $52,500.

In early 2020, Vázquez joined Uruguayan Segunda División team Atenas. He featured and scored in a friendly match with Boston River in March, but wouldn't appear in competitive action due to the season's start being delayed due to the COVID-19 pandemic. On 25 August 2020, Vázquez was announced as a new signing back in his homeland for Primera B Nacional outfit Barracas Central.

In July 2024, Vázquez joined Chilean Primera División club Coquimbo Unido from Independiente Rivadavia. The next year, he returned to Almirante Brown after his stint in 2023.

== Career statistics ==
As of 23 September 2020.

Club statistics
Club	Season	League			Cup		League Cup		Continental		Other		Total	
Club	Season	Division	Apps	Goals	Apps	Goals	Apps	Goals	Apps	Goals	Apps	Goals	Apps	Goals
All Boys	2014	Primera B Nacional	13	1	0	0	—		—		0	0	13	1
All Boys	2015	Primera B Nacional	8	1	1	0	—		—		0	0	9	1
All Boys	2016	Primera B Nacional	15	1	0	0	—		—		0	0	15	1
All Boys	2016–17	Primera B Nacional	33	5	1	0	—		—		0	0	34	5
All Boys	2017–18	Primera B Nacional	4	0	0	0	—		—		0	0	4	0
All Boys	Total		73	8	2	0	—		—		0	0	75	8
Correcaminos UAT	2017–18	Ascenso MX	5	0	2	0	—		—		0	0	7	0
Deportivo Pasto	2018	Categoría Primera A	11	1	0	0	—		—		0	0	11	1
Sportivo Luqueño	2019	Primera División	9	1	0	0	—		—		0	0	9	1
Atenas	2020	Segunda División	0	0	—		—		—		0	0	0	0
Barracas Central	2020–21	Primera B Nacional	0	0	0	0	—		—		0	0	0	0
Career total			98	10	4	0	—		—		0	0	102	10
