= 2024 Liga Deportiva Universitaria de Quito season =

L.D.U. Quito
2024 season
- President: Isaac Álvarez
- Manager: Pablo Sánchez
- Stadium: Estadio Rodrigo Paz Delgado
- LigaPro: Champions (13th title)
- CONMEBOL Libertadores: Group Stage
- CONMEBOL Recopa: Runner-up
- CONMEBOL Sudamericana: Round of 16
- Copa Ecuador: Quarter-finals
- Top goalscorer: League: Álex Arce (28 goals); All: Álex Arce (35 goals)
Home colours	Away colours	Third colours

Liga Deportiva Universitaria de Quito's 2024 season was the club's 94th year of existence, the 71st year in professional football, and the 63rd in the top level of professional football in Ecuador.

== Club ==
=== Personnel ===
President: Isaac Álvarez
Sporting manager: Eduardo Álvarez

=== Coaching staff ===
Manager: Pablo Sánchez
Assistant manager: Leandro Martín, Adrián Gabbarini
Physical trainer: Walter Minella
Goalkeeper trainer: Luis Preti

=== Kits ===
Supplier: Puma
Sponsor(s): Banco Pichincha, Chery, Discover, Ecuabet, Terrawind Global Protection

== Squad information ==
Num	Pos	Nat.	Player	Age	Since	App	Goals	Notes
1	GK	ECU	Gonzalo Valle	27	2024	0	0	
3	DF	ECU	Richard Mina	24	2023	13	0	
4	DF	HAI	Ricardo Adé	33	2023	28	0	
8	MF	ECU	Luis Estupiñán	24	2024	0	0	
9	FW	ARG	Lisandro Alzugaray	33	2023	30	5	
11	FW	ECU	Michael Estrada	27	2024	0	0	
12	GK	ECU	Ethan Minda	19	2022	1	0	
13	FW	ECU	Ruddy Mina	17	2024	0	0	
14	DF	ECU	José Quintero	33	2015	250	22	
15	MF	BOL	Gabriel Villamil	22	2024	0	0	
17	MF	ECU	Darío Mina	25	2024	0	0	
18	MF	ARG	Lucas Piovi	32	2020	93	0	
19	FW	PAR	Álex Arce	28	2024	0	0	
20	MF	CHI	Fernando Cornejo	28	2024	0	0	
21	MF	ECU	Ederson Castillo	15	2024	0	0	
22	GK	ECU	Alexander Domínguez	36	2022	332	0	Previously with the club from '06–'16
24	DF	ARG	Andrés Zanini	26	2024	0	0	
25	MF	ECU	Madison Julio	26	2024	0	0	
26	MF	ECU	Jhojan Julio	25	2023	176	23	Previously with the club from '16–'22
29	DF	ECU	Bryan Ramírez	23	2023	25	0	
30	DF	URU	Gian Franco Allala	27	2024	0	0	
31	DF	ECU	Daniel de la Cruz	20	2024	0	0	
32	MF	ECU	Juan Sebastián Rodríguez	18	2024	0	0	
33	DF	ECU	Leonel Quiñónez	30	2023	23	1	
35	FW	ECU	Jairón Charcopa	19	2021	4	0	
88	MF	ECU	Marco Angulo	21	2024	0	0	

Note: Caps and goals are of the national league and are current as of the beginning of the season.

=== Winter transfers ===
Players In
Name	Nat	Pos	Age	Moving from
Gonzalo Valle	ECU	GK	27	Guayaquil City (Ecuador)
Andrés Zanini	ARG	DF	26	Chacarita Juniors (Argentina)
Marco Angulo	ECU	MF	21	FC Cincinnati (United States) (Loan)
Joseph Espinoza	ECU	MF	23	Emelec (Ecuador) (Loan return)
Luis Estupiñán	ECU	MF	24	Técnico Universitario (Ecuador)
Juan Macías	ECU	MF	18	São Paulo (Brazil) (Loan return)
Gabriel Villamil	BOL	MF	22	Bolívar (Bolivia) (Loan)
Álex Arce	PAR	FW	28	Independiente Rivadavia (Argentina)
Michael Estrada	ECU	FW	27	CSKA Sofia (Bulgaria)
Miguel Parrales	ECU	FW	28	Guayaquil City (Ecuador) (Loan)

Players Out
Name	Nat	Pos	Age	Moving to
Adrián Gabbarini	ECU	GK	38	Retired
Yeltzin Erique	ECU	DF	20	Orense (Ecuador) (Loan)
Danny Luna	ECU	MF	32	Deportivo Cuenca (Ecuador)
Mauricio Martínez	ARG	MF	30	Rosario Central (Argentina)
Ariel Mina	ECU	MF	20	Cuniburo F.C. (Ecuador) (Loan)
Jefferson Valverde	ECU	MF	24	Houston Dynamo FC (United States)
José Enrique Angulo	ECU	FW	28	Delfín (Ecuador)
Walter Chalá	ECU	FW	31	Deportivo Cuenca (Ecuador)
Paolo Guerrero	PER	FW	40	Universidad César Vallejo (Peru)
Renato Ibarra	ECU	FW	32	Independiente del Valle (Ecuador)

=== Summer transfers ===
Players In
Name	Nat	Pos	Age	Moving from
Gian Franco Allala	URU	DF	27	Boston River (Uruguay)
Fernando Cornejo	CHI	MF	28	Palestino (Chile)
Madison Julio	ECU	MF	26	Oleksandriya (Ukraine)
Dario Mina	ECU	MF	25	Macará (Ecuador)

Players Out
Name	Nat	Pos	Age	Moving to
Facundo Rodríguez	ARG	DF	24	Estudiantes (Argentina)
Daykol Romero	ECU	DF	23	Universidad Católica (Ecuador) (Loan)
Alexander Alvarado	ECU	MF	25	Universidad Católica (Ecuador) (Loan)
Michael Bermúdez	ECU	MF	18	OFK Beograd (Serbia) (Loan)
Joseph Espinoza	ECU	MF	23	Macará (Ecuador) (Loan)
Sebastián González	ECU	MF	21	TBA
Juan Macías	ECU	MF	19	Macará (Ecuador) (Loan)
Óscar Zambrano	ECU	MF	20	Hull City (England) (Loan)
Jan Carlos Hurtado	VEN	FW	24	Atlético Goianiense (Brazil) (Loan return)
Miguel Parrales	ECU	FW	28	Orense (Ecuador)

== Competitions ==
Competition	Started round	Final position / round	First match	Last match
LigaPro	First Stage	Champions	March 4	December 14
CONMEBOL Libertadores	Group Stage	Group Stage	April 2	May 28
CONMEBOL Recopa	Final	Runner-up	February 22	February 29
CONMEBOL Sudamericana	Knockout round play-offs	Round of 16	July 18	August 21
Copa Ecuador	Round of 32	Quarter-finals	July 30	October 2

=== Pre-season friendlies ===
January 29 Noche Blanca	L.D.U. Quito	2–0	Universidad Católica	Quito
19:30 UTC−05:00	Jairón Charcopa 48', 56'			Stadium: Estadio Rodrigo Paz Delgado

=== LigaPro ===
The 2024 season was Liga's 63rd season in the Serie A and their 23rd consecutive. They won their 13th title.

==== First stage ====
Results summary

Overall								Home						Away					
Pld	W	D	L	GF	GA	GD	Pts	W	D	L	GF	GA	GD	W	D	L	GF	GA	GD
15	9	3	3	27	17	+10	30	5	1	1	15	7	+8	4	2	2	12	10	+2

Results by round

Round	1	2	3	4	5	6	7	8	9	10	11	12	13	14	15
Ground	H	A	H	A	A	H	A	H	A	H	A	H	A	H	A
Result	W	W	L	W	L	W	W	W	L	W	W	D	D	W	D
Position	6	3	7	4	6	2	3	1	4	4	4	4	4	3	3

Updated to match(es) played on June 2. Source: Competitive matches
A = Away; H = Home; W = Win; D = Draw; L = Loss

March 4 Round 1	L.D.U. Quito	2–1	Macará	Quito
19:00 UTC−05:00	Alzugaray 5'; Arce 30'; Adé (yellow card) 48'; Estupiñán (yellow card) 87'		Pons 8' (pen.), (yellow card) 36'; Morales (yellow card) 41'	Stadium: Estadio Rodrigo Paz Delgado; Attendance: 3,409; Referee: Oswaldo Contreras

March 10 Round 2	Cumbayá	1–3	L.D.U. Quito	Quito
18:00 UTC−05:00	Estacio (yellow card) 13'; Carabalí (yellow card) 48'; Hurtado (yellow card) 61'; Vides 73'; Altuna (yellow card) 75'		Alzugaray 11'; Quiñónez (yellow card) 30'; Arce 54', 63'; Rodríguez (yellow card) 58'; Piovi (yellow card) 83'	Stadium: Estadio Olímpico Atahualpa; Attendance: 3,563; Referee: Juan Carlos Andrade

March 16 Round 3	L.D.U. Quito	1–2	Aucas	Quito
15:30 UTC−05:00	Arce 4'; Piovi (yellow card) 38'; Alzugaray (yellow card) 50'; Domínguez (yellow card) 90+2'		Jaramillo (yellow card) 29'; Vega (yellow card) 32'; Carcelén 44', (yellow card) 76'; Medina 45+4'; Muñoz (yellow card) 59'; Reséndez (yellow card) 78'	Stadium: Estadio Rodrigo Paz Delgado; Attendance: 15,507; Referee: Alex Cajas

March 28 Round 6	L.D.U. Quito	5–0	Imbabura	Quito
19:00 UTC−05:00	Arce 12', 72', 75'; Rodríguez (yellow card) 65'; Piovi 81'; Charcopa 86', (yellow card) 87'		Folleco (yellow card) 42'; Coronel (yellow card) 64'	Stadium: Estadio Rodrigo Paz Delgado; Attendance: 3,021; Referee: Christian Guillén

April 6 Round 7	El Nacional	1–2	L.D.U. Quito	Quito
15:30 UTC−05:00	Peralta (yellow card) 19' (yellow-red card) 90+3'; Palacios 43'; Olmedo (yellow card) 90'		Rodríguez (yellow card) 32'; Piovi 34', (yellow card) 86'; Arce (yellow card) 32', (goal) 51'; Estupiñán (yellow card) 65'	Stadium: Estadio Olímpico Atahualpa; Attendance: 22,747; Referee: Gabriel González

April 15 Round 8	L.D.U. Quito	2–1	Delfín	Quito
19:00 UTC−05:00	Piovi (red card) 18'; Arce 39', 76' (pen.)		Elordi (yellow card) 20'; Alman (yellow card) 41'; Humanante (yellow card) 75'; Messiniti 88'	Stadium: Estadio Rodrigo Paz Delgado; Attendance: 3,663; Referee: Bruan Loayza

April 19 Round 9	Orense	1–0	L.D.U. Quito	Machala
16:30 UTC−05:00	Herrera 27'; Velasco (yellow card) 44'; Quiñónez (yellow card) 45+3'; Achilier (yellow card) 60'; Andrade (yellow card) 90+1'		Mina Caicedo (yellow card) 21'; Alzugaray (yellow card) 21'; Adé (yellow card) 58'; Julio (yellow card) 90+1'	Stadium: Estadio 9 de Mayo; Attendance: 3,612; Referee: Anthony Díaz

April 27 Round 10	L.D.U. Quito	1–0	Técnico Universitario	Quito
18:00 UTC−05:00	Arce 16'; Quiñónez (yellow card) 20'; Domínguez (yellow card) 82'; Adé (red card) 81'; Estrada (yellow card) 90+1'; Piovi (yellow card) 90+4'		Luzarraga (yellow card) 39' (yellow-red card) 46'	Stadium: Estadio Rodrigo Paz Delgado; Attendance: 5,361; Referee: Kevin Pazmiño

April 30 Round 4	Libertad	2–3	L.D.U. Quito	Loja
19:00 UTC−05:00	Caicedo (yellow card) 22'; Zambrano 60'; Ávila 68'		Charcopa 2', 28'; Estrada 17', (yellow card) 45+4'; Piovi (yellow card) 61'	Stadium: Estadio Federativo Reina del Cisne; Attendance: 1,009; Referee: Russell Terán
Note: This match was rescheduled because Liga's players were participating in international friendly matches with their national teams.

May 4 Round 11	Mushuc Runa	0–1	L.D.U. Quito	Ambato
15:30 UTC−05:00	Parrales (yellow card) 44'; Zambrano (yellow card) 45'; Bauman (yellow card) 45+6'		Arce 41'; Domínguez (yellow card) 45+3'; Villamil (yellow card) 45+5'; Alvarado (yellow card) 60', (red card) 78'; Estrada (yellow card) 90+2'	Stadium: Estadio COAC Mushuc Runa; Attendance: 4,999; Referee: Augusto Aragón

May 11 Round 12	L.D.U. Quito	2–2	Emelec	Quito
18:00 UTC−05:00	Alzugaray 12', (yellow card) 25'; Quiñónez (yellow card) 15'; Estrada 84'		Carabalí (yellow card) 46'; Castelli 66', (yellow card) 84' (yellow-red card) 86'; González (yellow card) 79'; Rivero 87'; Erbes (yellow card) 90+1'	Stadium: Estadio Rodrigo Paz Delgado; Attendance: 9,927; Referee: Alex Cajas

May 18 Round 13	Independiente del Valle	1–1	L.D.U. Quito	Quito
18:00 UTC−05:00	Carabajal (yellow card) 30'; Zabala 32'; Ibarra (yellow card) 56'; Fernández (yellow card) 90+5'		Arce 22', (yellow card) 74'; Estupiñán (yellow card) 69'; Rodríguez (yellow card) 81'	Stadium: Estadio Banco Guayaquil; Attendance: 6,387; Referee: Bryan Loayza

May 22 Round 5	Barcelona SC	2–0	L.D.U. Quito	Guayaquil
19:00 UTC−05:00	Díaz 30'; Fydriszewski 47'		Quiñónez (yellow card) 21'; Estrada (yellow card) 74' (yellow-red card) 82'; Zambrano (yellow card) 85'	Stadium: Monumental Banco Pichincha; Attendance: 10,514; Referee: Yerson Zambrano
Note: This match was rescheduled because Liga's players were participating in international friendly matches with their national teams.

May 25 Round 14	L.D.U. Quito	2–1	Universidad Católica	Quito
20:00 UTC−05:00	Arce 25'; Ramírez (yellow card) 29'; Quiñónez (yellow card) 32'; Villamil (yellow card) 36'; Mina Caicedo (yellow card) 55'; Estupiñán (yellow card) 68'; Martínez 87' (o.g.); Hurtado (yellow card) 90+4'		Clavijo (yellow card) 50'; Rodríguez (yellow card) 64'; Díaz (yellow card) 64', (goal) 81' (pen.); Anangonó (yellow card) 72'; Castillo (yellow card) 75'	Stadium: Estadio Rodrigo Paz Delgado; Attendance: 9,123; Referee: Gabriel González

June 2 Round 15	Deportivo Cuenca	2–2	L.D.U. Quito	Cuenca
18:00 UTC−05:00	Magnín 45' (pen.); Mancinelli 76'		Estrada 17'; Alzugaray 41'; Villamil (yellow card) 65'	Stadium: Estadio Alejandro Serrano Aguilar; Attendance: 9,018; Referee: Guillermo Guerrero

==== Second stage ====
Results summary

Overall								Home						Away					
Pld	W	D	L	GF	GA	GD	Pts	W	D	L	GF	GA	GD	W	D	L	GF	GA	GD
15	11	2	2	33	14	+19	35	6	2	0	19	4	+15	5	0	2	14	10	+4

Results by round

Round	1	2	3	4	5	6	7	8	9	10	11	12	13	14	15
Ground	A	H	A	H	H	A	H	A	H	A	H	A	H	A	H
Result	W	W	W	W	W	L	D	L	W	W	D	W	W	W	W
Position	1	1	2	1	1	1	1	2	1	1	2	2	1	1	1

Updated to match(es) played on December 1. Source: Competitive matches
A = Away; H = Home; W = Win; D = Draw; L = Loss

August 4 Round 1	Macará	0–4	L.D.U. Quito	Ambato
15:30 UTC−05:00	Álvarez (yellow card) 58'; Tello (yellow card) 72'; Muñoz (yellow card) 88'		Zambrano 12'; J. Julio 16'; Arce 43', 55'	Stadium: Estadio Bellavista; Attendance: 7,379; Referee: Yerson Zambrano

August 10 Round 2	L.D.U. Quito	2–1	Cumbayá	Quito
15:00 UTC−05:00	Arce 61'; Alzugaray 66'; J. Julio (yellow card) 90+4'		Gustavino 23'; Serpa (yellow card) 25'; Paredes (yellow card) 55'; Ortíz (yellow card) 68'; Plúas (yellow card) 88'	Stadium: Estadio Rodrigo Paz Delgado; Attendance: 7,196; Referee: Guillermo Guerrero

August 17 Round 3	Aucas	0–1	L.D.U. Quito	Quito
16:30 UTC−05:00	González (yellow card) 27'; Blanco (yellow card) 45+1'; Caicedo (yellow card) 76'		Ramírez (yellow card) 19'; Arce 52'; Quintero (yellow card) 90+1'	Stadium: Estadio Gonzalo Pozo Ripalda; Attendance: 8,959; Referee: Augusto Aragón

August 25 Round 4	L.D.U. Quito	3–0	Libertad	Quito
15:30 UTC−05:00	D. Mina (red card) 45'; Ramírez 61'; Adé 72'; Estupiñán 80'		Mina (yellow card) 33'; Caicedo (yellow card) 35'; Molina (yellow card) 38'; Bolaños (red card) 53'	Stadium: Estadio Rodrigo Paz Delgado; Attendance: 7,344; Referee: Oswaldo Contreras

August 31 Round 5	L.D.U. Quito	3–0	Barcelona SC	Quito
18:00 UTC−05:00	Cornejo 2'; Arce (yellow card) 22'; Quintero 29', 79'; Adé (yellow card) 37'; Ramírez (yellow card) 69'; Estupiñán (yellow card) 84'		Ramírez (yellow card) 28'; Chalá (yellow card) 71'; Oyola (yellow card) 84'	Stadium: Estadio Rodrigo Paz Delgado; Attendance: 19,134; Referee: Gabriel González

September 14 Round 6	Imbabura	4–0	L.D.U. Quito	Ibarra
16:30 UTC−05:00	Klimowicz 6', 44'; Paz 22'; Pantoja (yellow card) 27', (goal) 45+2' (pen.); Mendoza (yellow card) 66' (yellow-red card) 70'		Domínguez (yellow card) 69'	Stadium: Estadio Olímpico de Ibarra; Attendance: 6,353; Referee: Guillermo Guerrero

September 21 Round 7	L.D.U. Quito	1–1	El Nacional	Quito
16:30 UTC−05:00	Adé (yellow card) 19'; Villamil 45'; Mina Caicedo (yellow card) 71' (yellow-red card) 90+6'		Cortez 21' (pen.); Cabezas (yellow card) 27'; Cabeza (yellow card) 41'; Borja (yellow card) 53'; Pazmiño (yellow card) 85'; Mora (yellow card) 90+4'	Stadium: Estadio Rodrigo Paz Delgado; Attendance: 9,510; Referee: Augusto Aragón

September 29 Round 8	Delfín	3–2	L.D.U. Quito	Manta
15:00 UTC−05:00	Phillips 23', 72' (pen.); Angulo 89' (pen.)		Piovi 11', (yellow card) 71'; Allala (yellow card) 26'; Arce 45+2'; Adé (yellow card) 68'; Domínguez (yellow card) 72'; Charcopa (red card) -'	Stadium: Estadio Jocay; Attendance: 853; Referee: Franklin Congo

October 6 Round 9	L.D.U. Quito	2–0	Orense	Quito
14:30 UTC−05:00	Cornejo 21'; Alzugaray (yellow card) 59'; Ramírez 79'		Vásquez (yellow card) 27'; Servetto (yellow card) 45+11'; Calderón (yellow card) 83'	Stadium: Estadio Rodrigo Paz Delgado; Attendance: 7,243; Referee: Bryan Loayza

October 19 Round 10	Técnico Universitario	1–2	L.D.U. Quito	Ambato
15:30 UTC−05:00	Pérez (yellow card) 51'; Armas 83'; Torres (yellow card) 90'		Piovi (yellow card) 34'; Alzugaray 41' de la Cruz (yellow card) 53' (yellow-red card) 58'; Arce 65'	Stadium: Estadio Bellavista; Attendance: 6,312; Referee: Guillermo Guerrero

October 26 Round 11	L.D.U. Quito	1–1	Mushuc Runa	Quito
15:30 UTC−05:00	Montaño 27' (o.g.); Quiñónez (yellow card) 38' (yellow-red card) 75'; Piovi (yellow card) 79'; Arce (yellow card) 90+1'; Mina Caicedo (yellow card) 90+4'		Montaño (yellow card) 22'; Quintero (yellow card) 34'; Tapiero (red card) 80'; Acuña 90+3'; Mina (yellow card) 90+4'	Stadium: Estadio Rodrigo Paz Delgado; Attendance: 5,902; Referee: Robert Cabrera

November 3 Round 12	Emelec	0–1	L.D.U. Quito	Guayaquil
15:30 UTC−05:00	Ayoví (yellow card) 53'; Meli (yellow card) 72'; Cortéz (yellow card) 74'; Quiñónez (yellow card) 75'; Sánchez (yellow card) 90+5'; González (yellow card) 90+7'		Piovi 45+3', (yellow card) 54' de la Cruz (yellow card) 63'; Mina Caicedo (yellow card) 75'; Estrada (yellow card) 90+7'	Stadium: Estadio George Capwell; Attendance: 9,540; Referee: Juan Carlos Andrade

November 9 Round 13	L.D.U. Quito	2–1	Independiente del Valle	Quito
15:30 UTC−05:00	Arce 45+1'; Cornejo 62'		Medina 17'; Medina (yellow card) 60'; Carabajal (yellow card) 65'; Zárate (yellow card) 74'; Páez (yellow card) 90+3'	Stadium: Estadio Rodrigo Paz Delgado; Attendance: 19,267; Referee: Guillermo Guerrero

November 24 Round 14	Universidad Católica	2–4	L.D.U. Quito	Quito
15:30 UTC−05:00	Grillo (yellow card) 54'; Palacios 85' (pen.); Nieto 90+3' (pen.)		Arce 9', 32', 46'; Piovi 26'; Ramírez (yellow card) 45'; Domínguez (red card) 90+1'	Stadium: Estadio Olímpico Atahualpa; Attendance: 12,190; Referee: Bryan Loayza

December 1 Round 15	L.D.U. Quito	5–0	Deportivo Cuenca	Quito
15:30 UTC−05:00	Villamil 3', 90'; Ramírez 8'; Arce 22', 42'		Mera (yellow card) 47'; Duarte (yellow card) 70'	Stadium: Estadio Rodrigo Paz Delgado; Attendance: 17,963; Referee: Augusto Aragón

==== Finals ====
Results summary

Overall								Home						Away					
Pld	W	D	L	GF	GA	GD	Pts	W	D	L	GF	GA	GD	W	D	L	GF	GA	GD
2	1	0	1	3	1	+2	3	1	0	0	3	0	+3	0	0	1	0	1	−1

Results by round

Round	1	2
Ground	H	A
Result	W	L

Updated to match(es) played on December 14. Source: Competitive matches
A = Away; H = Home; W = Win; D = Draw; L = Loss

December 7 Finals	L.D.U. Quito	3–0	Independiente del Valle	Quito
15:30 UTC−05:00	Arce 45+2', 58'; Villamil 73'; Estrada (yellow card) 90'			Stadium: Estadio Rodrigo Paz Delgado; Attendance: 17,938; Referee: Bryan Loayza

December 14 Finals	Independiente del Valle	1–0	L.D.U. Quito	Quito
15:30 UTC−05:00	Carabajal (yellow card) 36'; Ibarra (yellow card) 42'; Caicedo (yellow card) 83'; Zárate 90+6'		Villamil (yellow card) 36'; Quiñónez (yellow card) 38' de la Cruz (yellow card) 45+2'; Adé (yellow card) 45+2'; Quintero (yellow card) 46'; Arce (yellow card) 82'	Stadium: Estadio Banco Guayaquil; Attendance: 8,800; Referee: Guillermo Guerrero

=== CONMEBOL Libertadores ===
L.D.U. Quito qualified to the 2024 CONMEBOL Libertadores—their 21st participation in the continental tournament—as champions of the 2023 CONMEBOL Sudamericana. They entered the competition in the Group Stage.

==== CONMEBOL Libertadores squad ====
No.	Pos.	Nation	Player
1	GK	ECU	Gonzalo Valle
3	DF	ECU	Richard Mina
4	DF	HAI	Ricardo Adé
6	DF	ARG	Facundo Rodríguez
7	FW	VEN	Jan Carlos Hurtado
8	MF	ECU	Luis Estupiñán
9	FW	ARG	Lisandro Alzugaray
10	MF	ECU	Alexander Alvarado
11	FW	ECU	Michael Estrada
12	GK	ECU	Ethan Minda
13	DF	ECU	Daykol Romero
14	DF	ECU	José Quintero
15	MF	BOL	Gabriel Villamil
16	FW	ECU	Miguel Parrales

No.	Pos.	Nation	Player
17	MF	ECU	Michael Bermúdez
18	MF	ARG	Lucas Piovi (captain)
19	FW	PAR	Álex Arce
21	MF	ECU	Sebastián González
22	GK	ECU	Alexander Domínguez
24	DF	ARG	Andrés Zanini
26	MF	ECU	Jhojan Julio
28	MF	ECU	Joseph Espinoza
29	DF	ECU	Bryan Ramírez
30	MF	ECU	Juan Macías
33	DF	ECU	Leonel Quiñónez
35	FW	ECU	Jairón Charcopa
88	MF	ECU	Marco Angulo

Overall								Home						Away					
Pld	W	D	L	GF	GA	GD	Pts	W	D	L	GF	GA	GD	W	D	L	GF	GA	GD
6	2	1	3	6	6	0	7	2	0	1	3	1	+2	0	1	2	3	5	−2

==== Group stage ====
Pos	Team	Pld	W	D	L	GF	GA	GD	Pts	Qualification	JUN	BOT	LDQ	UNI
1	(Colombia) Junior	6	2	4	0	7	4	+3	10	Advance to round of 16	—	0–0	1–1	1–1
2	(Brazil) Botafogo	6	3	1	2	7	6	+1	10	Advance to round of 16	1–3	—	2–1	3–1
3	(Ecuador) LDU Quito	6	2	1	3	6	6	0	7	Transfer to Copa Sudamericana	0–1	1–0	—	2–0
4	(Peru) Universitario	6	1	2	3	5	9	−4	5		1–1	0–1	2–1	—

Source: CONMEBOL

April 2 Round 1	Universitario (Peru)	2–1	(Ecuador) L.D.U. Quito	Lima
21:00 UTC−05:00	Saravia (yellow card) 13'; Rivera 50', 70'; Portocarrero (yellow card) 66'; Cabanillas (yellow card) 83'	Report	Angulo (yellow card) 20'; Quiñónez 29'; González (yellow card) 86'	Stadium: Estadio Monumental "U"; Referee: Esteban Ostojich (Uruguay)

April 11 Round 2	L.D.U. Quito (Ecuador)	1–0	(Brazil) Botafogo	Quito
17:00 UTC−05:00	Alzugaray 4'; Rodríguez (yellow card) 45+3'; Villamil (yellow card) 67'; Julio (yellow card) 84'	Report		Stadium: Estadio Rodrigo Paz Delgado; Referee: Andrés Matonte (Uruguay)

April 23 Round 3	Junior (Colombia)	1–1	(Ecuador) L.D.U. Quito	Barranquilla
21:00 UTC−05:00	Bacca 12' (pen.), (yellow card) 80'; Mena (yellow card) 21'; Peña (yellow card) 90+5'	Report	Estrada (yellow card) 21'; Arce 45' (pen.), (yellow card) 90'; Julio (yellow card) 61'	Stadium: Estadio Metropolitano Roberto Meléndez; Referee: Facundo Tello (Argentina)

May 8 Round 4	Botafogo (Brazil)	2–1	(Ecuador) L.D.U. Quito	Rio de Janeiro
21:30 UTC−03:00	Hugo 31'; Lucas Halter (yellow card) 45'; Marlon Freitas (yellow card) 51'; Luiz Henrique (yellow card) 56'; Júnior Santos 69'; Hernández (yellow card) 90'		Estrada 45+1', (yellow card) 45+7'; Domínguez (yellow card) 72'; Piovi (yellow card) 82'	Stadium: Estádio Olímpico Nilton Santos; Referee: Darío Herrera (Argentina)

May 14 Round 5	L.D.U. Quito (Ecuador)	0–1	(Colombia) Junior	Quito
17:00 UTC−05:00	Mina Caicedo (yellow card) 45'	Report	Pacheco (yellow card) 29'; Enamorado 37'	Stadium: Estadio Rodrigo Paz Delgado; Referee: Esteban Ostojich (Uruguay)

May 28 Round 6	L.D.U. Quito (Ecuador)	2–0	(Peru) Universitario	Quito
17:00 UTC−05:00	Arce 44'; Quintero (yellow card) 45+2'; Alzugaray 67'	Report	Gonzáles (yellow card) 63' (yellow-red card) 83'	Stadium: Estadio Rodrigo Paz Delgado; Referee: Darío Herrera (Argentina)

=== CONMEBOL Recopa ===
L.D.U. Quito qualified to the 2024 CONMEBOL Recopa—their 3rd participation in the continental tournament—as champions of the 2023 CONMEBOL Sudamericana.

==== CONMEBOL Recopa squad ====
No.	Pos.	Nation	Player
1	GK	ECU	Gonzalo Valle
3	DF	ECU	Richard Mina
4	DF	HAI	Ricardo Adé
5	MF	ECU	Óscar Zambrano
6	DF	ARG	Facundo Rodríguez
7	FW	VEN	Jan Carlos Hurtado
8	MF	ECU	Luis Estupiñán
9	FW	ARG	Lisandro Alzugaray
10	MF	ECU	Alexander Alvarado
11	FW	ECU	Michael Estrada
12	GK	ECU	Ethan Minda
13	DF	ECU	Daykol Romero
14	DF	ECU	José Quintero
15	MF	BOL	Gabriel Villamil
16	FW	ECU	Miguel Parrales

No.	Pos.	Nation	Player
17	MF	ECU	Michael Bermúdez
18	MF	ARG	Lucas Piovi (captain)
19	FW	PAR	Álex Arce
21	MF	ECU	Sebastián González
22	GK	ECU	Alexander Domínguez
24	DF	ARG	Andrés Zanini
25	MF	ECU	Jefferson Valverde
26	MF	ECU	Jhojan Julio
28	MF	ECU	Joseph Espinoza
29	DF	ECU	Bryan Ramírez
30	MF	ECU	Juan Macías
33	DF	ECU	Leonel Quiñónez
35	FW	ECU	Jairón Charcopa
88	MF	ECU	Marco Angulo

Overall								Home						Away					
Pld	W	D	L	GF	GA	GD	Pts	W	D	L	GF	GA	GD	W	D	L	GF	GA	GD
2	1	0	1	1	2	−1	3	1	0	0	1	0	+1	0	0	1	0	2	−2

February 22 Final	L.D.U. Quito (Ecuador)	1–0	(Brazil) Fluminense	Quito
19:30 UTC−05:00	Piovi (yellow card) 47'; Arce 90+2', (yellow card) 90+5'	Report	Matheus Martinelli (yellow card) 43'; Guga (yellow card) 74'	Stadium: Estadio Rodrigo Paz Delgado; Referee: Andrés Rojas (Colombia)

February 29 Final	Fluminense (Brazil)	2–0	(Ecuador) L.D.U. Quito	Rio de Janeiro
21:30 UTC−03:00	Arias 76', 90' (pen.); Thiago Santos (yellow card) 78'; John Kennedy (red card) 79'; Diogo Barbosa (red card) 90+3'; Cano (yellow card) 90+4'	Report	Quintero (yellow card) 67'; Julio (yellow card) 78'	Stadium: Maracanã; Referee: Facundo Tello (Argentina)

=== CONMEBOL Sudamericana ===
L.D.U. Quito qualified to the 2024 CONMEBOL Sudamericana—their 15th participation in the continental tournament—after finishing third in Group D 2024 CONMEBOL Libertadores. They entered the competition in the Knockout round play-offs.

==== CONMEBOL Sudamericana squad ====
No.	Pos.	Nation	Player
1	GK	ECU	Gonzalo Valle
3	DF	ECU	Richard Mina
4	DF	HAI	Ricardo Adé
5	MF	ECU	Óscar Zambrano
8	MF	ECU	Luis Estupiñán
9	FW	ARG	Lisandro Alzugaray
11	FW	ECU	Michael Estrada
12	GK	ECU	Ethan Minda
14	DF	ECU	José Quintero
15	MF	BOL	Gabriel Villamil
17	MF	ECU	Darío Mina
18	MF	ARG	Lucas Piovi (captain)

No.	Pos.	Nation	Player
19	FW	PAR	Álex Arce
20	MF	CHI	Fernando Cornejo
22	GK	ECU	Alexander Domínguez
24	DF	ARG	Andrés Zanini
25	MF	ECU	Madison Julio
26	MF	ECU	Jhojan Julio
29	DF	ECU	Bryan Ramírez
30	DF	URU	Gian Franco Allala
31	DF	ECU	Daniel de la Cruz
33	DF	ECU	Leonel Quiñónez
35	FW	ECU	Jairón Charcopa
88	MF	ECU	Marco Angulo

Overall								Home						Away					
Pld	W	D	L	GF	GA	GD	Pts	W	D	L	GF	GA	GD	W	D	L	GF	GA	GD
4	1	0	3	6	8	−2	3	1	0	1	4	2	+2	0	0	2	2	6	−4

==== Knockout round play-offs ====
July 18 Knockout round play-offs	L.D.U. Quito (Ecuador)	3–0	(Bolivia) Always Ready	Quito
19:30 UTC−05:00	Arce 16'; Adé 27'; J. Julio (yellow card) 48', (goal) 53'; Alzugaray (yellow card) 65'	Report	Caicedo (yellow card) 87'	Stadium: Estadio Rodrigo Paz Delgado; Referee: Kevin Ortega (Peru)

July 25 Knockout round play-offs	Always Ready (Bolivia)	3–1	(Ecuador) L.D.U. Quito	El Alto
20:30 UTC−04:00	Terrazas 1'; Cuéllar (yellow card) 17'; Carabalí (yellow card) 82', (goal) 88'; Martínes 84'	Report	Adé (yellow card) 43'; Alzugaray 50'; Estrada (yellow card) 85'; Villamil (yellow card) 86'	Stadium: Estadio Municipal de El Alto; Referee: Flavio de Souza (Brazil)

==== Round of 16 ====
August 14 Round of 16	L.D.U. Quito (Ecuador)	1–2	(Argentina) Lanús	Quito
19:30 UTC−05:00	Arce 14'; Piovi (yellow card) 19'; D. Mina (yellow card) 90+2'	Report	Pérez 23'; Moreno 45+1'; Aquino (yellow card) 64'	Stadium: Estadio Rodrigo Paz Delgado; Referee: Juan Benítez (Paraguay)

August 21 Round of 16	Lanús (Argentina)	3–1	(Ecuador) L.D.U. Quito	Lanús
21:30 UTC−03:00	Bou 9'; Aquino (yellow card) 33'; Morgantini (yellow card) 73'; Izquierdoz 78'; Acosta 89'	Report	Arce 37'; Piovi (yellow card) 77'; J. Julio (yellow card) 81'; Estupiñán (yellow card) 90+3'	Stadium: Estadio Ciudad de Lanús – Néstor Díaz Pérez; Referee: Kevin Ortega (Peru)

=== Copa Ecuador ===
It will be L.D.U. Quito's 3rd participation in the Copa Ecuador. They entered the competition in the Round of 32.

Overall								Home						Away					
Pld	W	D	L	GF	GA	GD	Pts	W	D	L	GF	GA	GD	W	D	L	GF	GA	GD
3	1	2	0	3	0	+3	5	1	1	0	3	0	+3	0	1	0	0	0	0

==== Round of 32 ====
July 30 Round of 32	Bonita Banana	0–0 (0–3 p)	L.D.U. Quito	Machala
19:00 UTC−00:00	García (yellow card) 25'		Zanini (yellow card) 38'; Piovi (yellow card) 87'	Stadium: Estadio 9 de Mayo; Referee: Mario Romero
	Penalties
	Montaño (penalty missed); Zhingre (penalty missed); Méndez (penalty missed)		(penalty scored) Arce; (penalty scored) Alzugaray; (penalty missed) Piovi; (penalty scored) Estrada

==== Round of 16 ====
August 28 Round of 16	L.D.U. Quito	3–0	Deportivo Cuenca	Quito
18:30 UTC−00:00	Alzugaray (yellow card) 10'; M. Julio 33'; Arce 70'; Piovi (yellow card) 74'; Villamil 75'		Zanini (yellow card) 38'; Piovi (yellow card) 87'	Stadium: Estadio Rodrigo Paz Delgado; Referee: Kevin Pazmiño

==== Quarter-finals ====
October 2 Quarter-finals	L.D.U. Quito	0–0 (1–3 p)	El Nacional	Quito
17:00 UTC−00:00	Ramírez (yellow card) 53' (yellow-red card) 90+3'; Quintero (yellow card) 57'		Arce (red card) 60'	Stadium: Estadio Rodrigo Paz Delgado; Referee: Gabriel González
	Penalties
	Arce (penalty scored); Alzugaray (penalty missed); Quiñónez (penalty missed); Piovi (penalty missed)		(penalty missed) Bedoya; (penalty scored) Cela; (penalty scored) Pineida; (penalty scored) Vélez

== Player statistics ==
Num	Pos	Player	App	Goal	Yellow card	Red card	App	Goal	Yellow card	Red card	App	Goal	Yellow card	Red card	App	Goal	Yellow card	Red card	App	Goal	Yellow card	Red card	App	Goal	Yellow card	Red card
Num	Pos	Player	LigaPro				CONMEBOL Libertadores				CONMEBOL Recopa				CONMEBOL Sudamericana				Copa Ecuador				Total			
1	GK	Gonzalo Valle	3	—	—	—	—	—	—	—	—	—	—	—	2	—	—	—	1	—	—	—	6	—	—	—
3	DF	Richard Mina	21	—	4	1	3	—	1	—	2	—	—	—	3	—	—	—	1	—	—	—	30	—	5	1
4	DF	Ricardo Adé	27	1	6	1	5	—	—	—	2	—	—	—	4	1	1	—	2	—	—	—	40	2	7	1
8	MF	Luis Estupiñán	28	1	5	—	6	—	—	—	2	—	—	—	3	—	1	—	3	—	—	—	42	1	6	—
9	FW	Lisandro Alzugaray	24	6	4	—	5	2	—	—	2	—	—	—	4	1	1	—	3	—	1	—	38	9	6	—
11	FW	Michael Estrada	23	3	5	1	6	1	2	—	2	—	—	—	2	—	1	—	1	—	—	—	34	4	8	1
12	GK	Ethan Minda	—	—	—	—	—	—	—	—	—	—	—	—	—	—	—	—	—	—	—	—	—	—	—	—
13	FW	Ruddy Mina	1	—	—	—	—	—	—	—	—	—	—	—	—	—	—	—	—	—	—	—	1	—	—	—
14	DF	José Quintero	18	2	2	—	6	—	1	—	2	—	1	—	4	—	—	—	2	—	1	—	32	2	5	—
15	MF	Gabriel Villamil	24	4	4	—	4	—	1	—	2	—	—	—	2	—	1	—	3	1	—	—	35	5	6	—
17	MF	Darío Mina	5	—	—	1	—	—	—	—	—	—	—	—	2	—	1	—	2	—	—	—	9	—	1	1
18	MF	Lucas Piovi	28	5	9	1	6	—	1	—	2	—	1	—	3	—	2	—	3	—	2	—	42	5	15	1
19	FW	Álex Arce	31	28	5	—	6	2	1	—	2	1	1	—	4	3	—	—	3	1	—	—	46	35	7	—
20	MF	Fernando Cornejo	17	3	—	—	—	—	—	—	—	—	—	—	4	—	—	—	3	—	—	—	24	3	—	—
21	MF	Ederson Castillo	1	—	—	—	—	—	—	—	—	—	—	—	—	—	—	—	—	—	—	—	1	—	—	—
22	GK	Alexander Domínguez	30	—	5	1	6	—	1	—	2	—	—	—	2	—	—	—	2	—	—	—	42	—	6	1
24	DF	Andrés Zanini	7	—	—	—	1	—	—	—	—	—	—	—	—	—	—	—	2	—	1	—	10	—	1	—
25	MF	Madison Julio	15	—	—	—	—	—	—	—	—	—	—	—	—	—	—	—	1	1	—	—	16	1	—	—
26	MF	Jhojan Julio	17	1	2	—	4	—	2	—	2	—	1	—	4	1	2	—	2	—	—	—	29	2	7	—
29	DF	Bryan Ramírez	26	3	4	—	3	—	—	—	—	—	—	—	2	—	—	—	2	—	—	1	33	3	4	1
30	DF	Gian Franco Allala	8	—	1	—	—	—	—	—	—	—	—	—	2	—	—	—	2	—	—	—	12	—	1	—
31	DF	Daniel de la Cruz	12	—	2	1	—	—	—	—	—	—	—	—	—	—	—	—	2	—	—	—	14	—	2	1
32	MF	Juan Sebastián Rodríguez	7	—	—	—	—	—	—	—	—	—	—	—	—	—	—	—	—	—	—	—	7	—	—	—
33	DF	Leonel Quiñónez	30	—	6	1	6	1	—	—	2	—	—	—	4	—	—	—	3	—	—	—	45	1	6	1
35	FW	Jairón Charcopa	11	3	1	1	2	—	—	—	—	—	—	—	3	—	—	—	1	—	—	—	17	3	1	1
88	MF	Marco Angulo	11	—	—	—	5	—	1	—	—	—	—	—	2	—	—	—	2	—	—	—	20	—	1	—
5	MF	Óscar Zambrano	13	1	1	—	—	—	—	—	2	—	—	—	2	—	—	—	—	—	—	—	17	1	1	—
6	DF	Facundo Rodríguez	11	—	4	—	5	—	1	—	—	—	—	—	—	—	—	—	—	—	—	—	16	—	5	—
7	FW	Jan Carlos Hurtado	5	—	1	—	2	—	—	—	2	—	—	—	—	—	—	—	—	—	—	—	9	—	1	—
10	MF	Alexander Alvarado	10	—	1	1	3	—	—	—	—	—	—	—	1	—	—	—	—	—	—	—	14	—	1	1
13	DF	Daykol Romero	7	—	—	—	2	—	—	—	—	—	—	—	—	—	—	—	—	—	—	—	9	—	—	—
16	FW	Miguel Parrales	9	—	—	—	1	—	—	—	—	—	—	—	—	—	—	—	—	—	—	—	10	—	—	—
17	MF	Michael Bermúdez	—	—	—	—	—	—	—	—	—	—	—	—	—	—	—	—	—	—	—	—	—	—	—	—
21	MF	Sebastián González	7	—	—	—	2	—	1	—	2	—	—	—	—	—	—	—	—	—	—	—	11	—	1	—
25	MF	Jefferson Valverde	1	—	—	—	—	—	—	—	1	—	—	—	—	—	—	—	—	—	—	—	2	—	—	—
28	MF	Joseph Espinoza	5	—	—	—	1	—	—	—	—	—	—	—	—	—	—	—	—	—	—	—	6	—	—	—
34	MF	Juan Macías	—	—	—	—	—	—	—	—	—	—	—	—	—	—	—	—	—	—	—	—	—	—	—	—
Totals			—	61	72	10	—	6	13	0	—	1	4	0	—	6	10	0	—	3	5	1	—	77	104	11

As of December 14, 2024

Note: Players in italics left the club mid-season.

== Team statistics ==
	Total	Home	Away
Total Games played	47	24	23
Total Games won	26	17	9
Total Games drawn	8	4	4
Total Games lost	13	3	10
Games played (LigaPro)	32	16	16
Games won (LigaPro)	21	12	9
Games drawn (LigaPro)	5	3	2
Games lost (LigaPro)	6	1	5
Games played (CONMEBOL Libertadores)	6	3	3
Games won (CONMEBOL Libertadores)	2	2	
Games drawn (CONMEBOL Libertadores)	1		1
Games lost (CONMEBOL Libertadores)	3	1	2
Games played (CONMEBOL Recopa)	2	1	1
Games won (CONMEBOL Recopa)	1	1	
Games drawn (CONMEBOL Recopa)			
Games lost (CONMEBOL Recopa)	1		1
Games played (CONMEBOL Sudamericana)	4	2	2
Games won (CONMEBOL Sudamericana)	1	1	
Games drawn (CONMEBOL Sudamericana)			
Games lost (CONMEBOL Sudamericana)	3	1	2
Games played (Copa Ecuador)	3	2	1
Games won (Copa Ecuador)	1	1	
Games drawn (Copa Ecuador)	2	1	1
Games lost (Copa Ecuador)			
Biggest win (LigaPro)	5–0 vs Imbabura; 5–0 vs Deportivo Cuenca	5–0 vs Imbabura; 5–0 vs Deportivo Cuenca	4–0 vs Macará
Biggest loss (LigaPro)	0–4 vs Imbabura	1–2 vs Aucas	0–4 vs Imbabura
Biggest win (CONMEBOL Libertadores)	2–0 vs Universitario	2–0 vs Universitario	
Biggest loss (CONMEBOL Libertadores)	1–2 vs Universitario; 1–2 vs Botafogo; 0–1 vs Junior	0–1 vs Junior	1–2 vs Universitario; 1–2 vs Botafogo
Biggest win (CONMEBOL Recopa)	1–0 vs Fluminense	1–0 vs Fluminense	
Biggest loss (CONMEBOL Recopa)	0–2 vs Fluminense		0–2 vs Fluminense
Biggest win (CONMEBOL Sudamericana)	3–0 vs Always Ready	3–0 vs Always Ready	
Biggest loss (CONMEBOL Sudamericana)	1–3 vs Always Ready; 1–3 vs Lanús	1–2 vs Lanús	1–3 vs Always Ready; 1–3 vs Lanús
Biggest win (Copa Ecuador)	3–0 vs Deportivo Cuenca	3–0 vs Deportivo Cuenca	
Biggest loss (Copa Ecuador)			
Clean sheets	18	13	5
Goals scored	79	48	31
Goals conceded	48	14	34
Goal difference	+31	+34	-3
Average GF per game	1.68	2	1.35
Average GA per game	1.02	0.58	1.48
Yellow cards	104	44	60
Red cards	11	6	5
Most appearances	Álex Arce (46)	Álex Arce (24); Leonel Quiñónez (24)	Álex Arce (22)
Most minutes played	Leonel Quiñónez (3789)	Leonel Quiñónez (2032)	Alexander Domínguez (1845)
Top scorer	Álex Arce (35)	Álex Arce (20)	Álex Arce (15)
Worst discipline	Lucas Piovi (1) (red card) (15) (yellow card)	Lucas Piovi (1) (red card) (6) (yellow card)	Michael Estrada (1) (red card) (6) (yellow card)
Penalties for	2/3 (66.67%)	1/1 (100%)	1/2 (50%)
Penalties against	11/13 (84.62%)	3/3 (100%)	8/10 (80%)
League Points	68/96 (70.83%)	39/48 (81.25%)	29/48 (60.42%)
Winning rate	55.32%	70.83%	39.13%

As of December 14, 2024
Source: See Competitive matches (above)
