= 2024 Recopa Sudamericana =

CONMEBOL Recopa Sudamericana 2024
LDU Quito	Fluminense
(Ecuador)	(Brazil)
1	2
- on aggregate

First leg
LDU Quito	Fluminense
1	0
- Date: 22 February 2024
- Venue: Estadio Rodrigo Paz Delgado, Quito
- Referee: Andrés Rojas (Colombia)
- Attendance: 30,712

Second leg
Fluminense	LDU Quito
2	0
- Date: 29 February 2024
- Venue: Maracanã, Rio de Janeiro
- Referee: Facundo Tello (Argentina)
- Attendance: 61,217

The 2024 CONMEBOL Recopa Sudamericana (Portuguese: CONMEBOL Recopa Sul-Americana de 2024) was the 32nd edition of the CONMEBOL Recopa Sudamericana (also referred to as the Recopa Sudamericana), the football competition organized by CONMEBOL between the winners of the previous season's two major South American club tournaments, the Copa Libertadores and the Copa Sudamericana.

The competition was contested in two-legged home-and-away format between Brazilian team Fluminense, the 2023 Copa Libertadores champions, and Ecuadorian team LDU Quito, the 2023 Copa Sudamericana champions. The first leg was hosted by LDU Quito at Estadio Rodrigo Paz Delgado in Quito, Ecuador on 22 February 2024 while the second leg was hosted by Fluminense at Maracanã in Rio de Janeiro, Brazil on 29 February 2024. The matches had been originally scheduled played on 21 and 28 February 2024.

Fluminense were the champions, winning their first Recopa Sudamericana title after defeating LDU Quito 2–1 on aggregate.

== Teams ==
Team	Qualification	Previous appearances (bold indicates winners)
(Brazil) Fluminense	2023 Copa Libertadores champions	0
(Ecuador) LDU Quito	2023 Copa Sudamericana champions	2 (**2009** and **2010**)

== Format ==
The Recopa Sudamericana was played on a home-and-away two-legged basis, with the Copa Libertadores champions hosting the second leg. If tied on aggregate at the end of the second leg, 30 minutes of extra time would be played. If still tied after extra time, the penalty shoot-out would be used to determine the winners (Regulations Article 17).

== Matches ==
CONMEBOL confirmed team uniforms on 5 February 2024.

Spanish coach Josep Alcácer (LDU Quito) was not on the bench, as he does not have the necessary qualification for tournaments organized by CONMEBOL. He was replaced by assistant coach Adrián Gabbarini.

=== First leg ===
22 February 2024
19:30 UTC−5

LDU Quito (Ecuador)	1–0	(Brazil) Fluminense
Arce 90+2'	Report

Estadio Rodrigo Paz Delgado, Quito
Attendance: 30,712
Referee: Andrés Rojas (Colombia)

**LDU Quito**	**Fluminense**

GK	22	(Ecuador) Alexander Domínguez
RB	14	(Ecuador) José Quintero
CB	4	(Haiti) Ricardo Adé
CB	3	(Ecuador) Richard Mina
LB	33	(Ecuador) Leonel Quiñónez
DM	5	(Ecuador) Óscar Zambrano		(substituted off) 70'
RM	8	(Ecuador) Luis Estupiñán		(substituted off) 56'
CM	18	(Argentina) Lucas Piovi (c)	(yellow card) 47'
CM	21	(Ecuador) Sebastián González		(substituted off) 77'
LM	26	(Ecuador) Jhojan Julio
FW	7	(Venezuela) Jan Carlos Hurtado		(substituted off) 70'
Substitutes:
GK	1	(Ecuador) Gonzalo Valle
DF	13	(Ecuador) Daykol Romero
DF	24	(Argentina) Andrés Zanini
DF	29	(Ecuador) Bryan Ramírez
MF	10	(Ecuador) Alexander Alvarado
MF	15	(Bolivia) Gabriel Villamil		(substituted on) 70'
MF	25	(Ecuador) Jefferson Valverde
FW	9	(Argentina) Lisandro Alzugaray		(substituted on) 77'
FW	11	(Ecuador) Michael Estrada		(substituted on) 70'
FW	16	(Ecuador) Miguel Parrales
FW	19	(Paraguay) Alex Arce	(yellow card) 90+5'	(substituted on) 56'
FW	35	(Ecuador) Jairón Charcopa
Manager:
(Argentina) Adrián Gabbarini (assistant)			(yellow card) 78'

GK	1	(Brazil) Fábio
RB	23	(Brazil) Guga	(yellow card) 74'
CB	29	(Brazil) Thiago Santos
CB	30	(Brazil) Felipe Melo (c)		(substituted off) 56'
LB	12	(Brazil) Marcelo		(substituted off) 14'
DM	8	(Brazil) Martinelli	(yellow card) 43'
CM	7	(Brazil) André
CM	10	(Brazil) Ganso		(substituted off) 69'
RF	21	(Colombia) Jhon Arias
CF	14	(Argentina) Germán Cano		(substituted off) 69'
LF	11	(Brazil) Keno		(substituted off) 55'
Substitutes:
GK	27	(Brazil) Felipe Alves
DF	4	(Brazil) Marlon		(substituted on) 56'
DF	6	(Brazil) Diogo Barbosa		(substituted on) 14'
DF	25	(Brazil) Antônio Carlos
MF	5	(Brazil) Alexsander
MF	20	(Brazil) Renato Augusto
MF	22	(Brazil) Gabriel Pires
MF	45	(Brazil) Lima		(substituted on) 69'
MF	80	(Uruguay) David Terans
FW	18	(Brazil) Lelê		(substituted on) 69'
FW	77	(Brazil) Marquinhos
FW	90	(Brazil) Douglas Costa		(substituted on) 55'
Manager:
(Brazil) Fernando Diniz			(yellow card) 17'

Assistant referees:
Alexander Guzmán (Colombia)
Jhon Gallego (Colombia)
Fourth official:
Jhon Ospina (Colombia)
Fifth official:
Richard Ortiz (Colombia)
Video assistant referee:
Nicolás Gallo (Colombia)
Assistant video assistant referees:
John León (Colombia)
Yadir Acuña (Colombia)
John Perdomo (Colombia)

Match rules:

- 90 minutes.
- Twelve named substitutes, of which up to five may be used.

=== Second leg ===
29 February 2024
21:30 UTC−3

Fluminense (Brazil)	2–0	(Ecuador) LDU Quito
Arias 76', 90' (pen.)	Report

Maracanã, Rio de Janeiro
Attendance: 61,217
Referee: Facundo Tello (Argentina)

**Fluminense**	**LDU Quito**

GK	1	(Brazil) Fábio
RB	2	(Brazil) Samuel Xavier		(substituted off) 85'
CB	29	(Brazil) Thiago Santos	(yellow card) 78'
CB	30	(Brazil) Felipe Melo (c)		(substituted off) 46'
LB	6	(Brazil) Diogo Barbosa	(red card) 90+3'	(substituted off) 67'
RM	8	(Brazil) Martinelli
CM	7	(Brazil) André
LM	10	(Brazil) Ganso		(substituted off) 67'
RF	21	(Colombia) Jhon Arias
CF	14	(Argentina) Germán Cano	(yellow card) 90+4'
LF	11	(Brazil) Keno		(substituted off) 66'
Substitutes:
GK	27	(Brazil) Felipe Alves
DF	4	(Brazil) Marlon
DF	12	(Brazil) Marcelo		(substituted on) 67'
DF	23	(Brazil) Guga		(substituted on) 85'
DF	25	(Brazil) Antônio Carlos
MF	5	(Brazil) Alexsander
MF	20	(Brazil) Renato Augusto		(substituted on) 67'
MF	45	(Brazil) Lima
MF	80	(Uruguay) David Terans
FW	9	(Brazil) John Kennedy	(red card) 79'	(substituted on) 46'
FW	18	(Brazil) Lelê
FW	90	(Brazil) Douglas Costa		(substituted on) 66'
Manager:
(Brazil) Fernando Diniz

GK	22	(Ecuador) Alexander Domínguez
RB	14	(Ecuador) José Quintero	(yellow card) 67'
CB	4	(Haiti) Ricardo Adé
CB	3	(Ecuador) Richard Mina
LB	33	(Ecuador) Leonel Quiñónez
DM	5	(Ecuador) Óscar Zambrano		(substituted off) 90+1'
RM	8	(Ecuador) Luis Estupiñán		(substituted off) 72'
CM	18	(Argentina) Lucas Piovi (c)
CM	25	(Ecuador) Jefferson Valverde		(substituted off) 90+1'
LM	21	(Ecuador) Sebastián González		(substituted off) 82'
FW	7	(Venezuela) Jan Carlos Hurtado		(substituted off) 71'
Substitutes:
GK	1	(Ecuador) Gonzalo Valle
DF	13	(Ecuador) Daykol Romero
DF	24	(Argentina) Andrés Zanini
DF	29	(Ecuador) Bryan Ramírez
MF	9	(Argentina) Lisandro Alzugaray		(substituted on) 82'
MF	10	(Ecuador) Alexander Alvarado
MF	15	(Bolivia) Gabriel Villamil		(substituted on) 90+1'
MF	26	(Ecuador) Jhojan Julio	(yellow card) 78'	(substituted on) 72'
FW	11	(Ecuador) Michael Estrada		(substituted on) 90+1'
FW	16	(Ecuador) Miguel Parrales
FW	19	(Paraguay) Alex Arce		(substituted on) 71'
FW	35	(Ecuador) Jairón Charcopa
Manager:
(Argentina) Adrián Gabbarini (assistant)			(red card) 90+3'

Assistant referees:
Ezequiel Brailovsky (Argentina)
Gabriel Chade (Argentina)
Fourth official:
Darío Herrera (Argentina)
Fifth official:
Maximiliano Del Yesso (Argentina)
Video assistant referee:
Mauro Vigliano (Argentina)
Assistant video assistant referees:
Cristian Navarro (Argentina)
Hernán Mastrangelo (Argentina)
Héctor Paletta (Argentina)

Match rules:

- 90 minutes.
- 30 minutes of extra time if tied on aggregate (away goals rule not applied).
- Penalty shoot-out if still tied on aggregate after extra time.
- Twelve named substitutes.
- Maximum of five substitutions, with a sixth allowed in extra time.
