= Óscar Zambrano =

Ecuadorian footballer (born 2004)

Personal information
- Full name: Óscar Steven Zambrano Preciado
- Date of birth: 20 April 2004 (age 22)
- Place of birth: Santo Domingo, Ecuador
- Height: 1.76 m (5 ft 9 in)
- Position: Defensive midfielder

Team information
- Current team: Hull City
- Number: 20

Youth career
- Colorados Jaipadida
- 2016: L.D.U. Quito
- 2017: América de Quito
- 2018–2022: L.D.U. Quito

Senior career*
| Years | Team | Apps | (Gls) |
| 2022–2025 | L.D.U. Quito | 50 | (2) |
| 2024–2025 | → Hull City (loan) | 8 | (1) |
| 2025–2026 | NK Maribor | 7 | (2) |
| 2026– | Hull City | 0 | (0) |

International career^{‡}
| 2019 | Ecuador U15 | 1 | (0) |
| 2022– | Ecuador U20 | 14 | (0) |
| 2026– | Ecuador | 1 | (0) |
- * Club domestic league appearances and goals as of 1 August 2025 ‡ National team caps and goals as of 14 November 2026

Óscar Steven Zambrano Preciado (born 20 April 2004) is an Ecuadorian professional footballer who plays as a defensive midfielder for Premier League club Hull City and the Ecuador national team.

== Early life ==
Born in the Santo Domingo Canton of Ecuador, Zambrano is the youngest of six siblings, with one of his brothers, Jefferson Preciado, also going on to become a footballer.

== Club career ==
Zambrano began his footballing career in the same academy as compatriot and current Ecuador international footballer Moisés Caicedo - Colorados Jaipadida. He joined the academy of L.D.U. Quito in 2016, but spent the following season with América de Quito. He returned to L.D.U. Quito and progressed through the academy, before making his professional debut in a 2–0 Ecuadorian Serie A win over Cumbayá on 10 April 2022.

Having already trialled at Dutch side Ajax in 2022, Zambrano was again linked with a move to Europe the following season, with club president Esteban Paz stating that teams were interested, but that they hadn't "received any concrete offer yet". He was later linked with Brazilian side São Paulo and American MLS team Colorado Rapids.

On 16 August 2024, Zambrano joined EFL Championship club Hull City on a season-long loan, with the club having an option to buy in the summer of 2025. He made his debut on 24 August 2024, in the Tigers' 0–0 draw at home to Millwall. On 28 September 2024, he scored a goal in the 4–1 home win against Cardiff City.

=== Return to Hull City ===
On 21 July 2026, Zambrano returned to Hull City on a permanent deal for an undisclosed fee, signing a four-year contract, with the option of an extra year.

== International career ==
Zambrano was called up to the Ecuador under-20 side for the 2023 FIFA U-20 World Cup, where he was one of Ecuador's better players in a campaign that saw them knocked out in the round of 16 by South Korea.

Zambrano made his debut for the Ecuador national team on 13 November 2026 in a friendly against Costa Rica.

== Doping ban ==
Following the 2024 Recopa Sudamericana second leg on 29 February 2024, a game which Zambrano and Quito lost, Zambrano tested positive for doping. He was, however, allowed to keep playing competitive football. That was until 5 November 2024, when CONMEBOL suspended Zambrano for 16 months. By this time, he had gone out on loan to Hull and made 8 league appearances for his new team, scoring one goal in the process. Five months later, on 13 March 2025, Zambrano had his appeal heard by the Court of Arbitration for Sport. On 24 April, it was reported that the ban had been reduced, with the new expiry date set for 3 November 2025.

== Career statistics ==
As of match played 23 July 2026

Appearances and goals by club, season and competition
| Club | Season | League | | | National cup (Note: Includes Copa Ecuador) | | League cup | | Continental | | Other | | Total | |
| Club | Season | Division | Apps | Goals | Apps | Goals | Apps | Goals | Apps | Goals | Apps | Goals | Apps | Goals |
|---|---|---|---|---|---|---|---|---|---|---|---|---|---|---|
| LDU Quito | 2022 | Ecuadorian Serie A | 13 | 1 | 2 | 0 | — | | 2 (Note: Appearances in the Copa Sudamericana) | 0 | — | | 17 | 1 |
| LDU Quito | 2023 | Ecuadorian Serie A | 24 | 0 | 0 | 0 | — | | 7 | 0 | — | | 31 | 0 |
| LDU Quito | 2024 | Ecuadorian Serie A | 13 | 1 | 0 | 0 | — | | 4 (Note: Two appearances in the Recopa Sudamericana and two appearances in the Copa Sudamericana) | 0 | — | | 17 | 1 |
| LDU Quito | Total | | 50 | 2 | 2 | 0 | — | | 13 | 0 | — | | 65 | 2 |
| Hull City (loan) | 2024–25 | Championship | 8 | 1 | 0 | 0 | — | | — | | — | | 8 | 1 |
| NK Maribor | 2025–26 | Slovenian PrvaLiga | 7 | 2 | 0 | 0 | — | | 0 | 0 | — | | 7 | 2 |
| Hull City | 2026–27 | Premier League | 0 | 0 | 0 | 0 | 0 | 0 | — | | — | | 0 | 0 |
| Career total | | | 65 | 5 | 2 | 0 | 0 | 0 | 13 | 0 | 0 | 0 | 73 | 3 |
