= Epifanio Brizuela =

Argentine footballer

Personal information
- Place of birth: Argentina
- Position: Forward

Senior career*
Years	Team	Apps	(Gls)
1959–1960	Macará		
1960-1963	LDU Quito		
1964	Montreal Italica		
1964	Montreal Cantalia		
1966	Montreal Italica		
1967	Montreal Portuguese		
1968–1973	Montreal Spania		
- * Club domestic league appearances and goals

Epifanio Brizuela is an Argentine former footballer who played as a forward.

== Career ==
Brizuela played in the Campeonato Ecuatoriano de Fútbol in 1959 with C.S.D. Macará. He recorded 15 goals for Macara during the 1960 season. In 1963, he played with L.D.U. Quito, and finished as the club's top goal scorer in the Interandino tournament. In 1964, he played abroad in the Eastern Canada Professional Soccer League with Montréal Italica. He was later released and signed a contract with Montreal Cantalia of the National Soccer League. He returned to his former club Montreal Italica for the 1966 ECPSL season.

In 1967, he played in the Quebec Major Soccer League with Montreal Portuguese. The following season he signed with league rivals Montreal Spania. He re-signed with Spania for the 1969 season. He finished second in the league scoring charts with ten goals during the 1970 season. He continued playing with Spania for three more seasons from 1971 till the 1973 season.
