= 1975 Campeonato Ecuatoriano de Fútbol Serie A =

Campeonato Ecuatoriano de Fútbol
- Season: 1975
- Champions: LDU Quito (3rd title)
- Copa Libertadores: LDU Quito; Deportivo Cuenca
- Top goalscorer: Ángel Liciardi (36 goals)
- Biggest home win: Deportivo Cuenca 6–0 LDU Portoviejo
- Biggest away win: LDU Portoviejo 0–5 Barcelona
- Highest scoring: Emelec 7–2 LDU Portoviejo

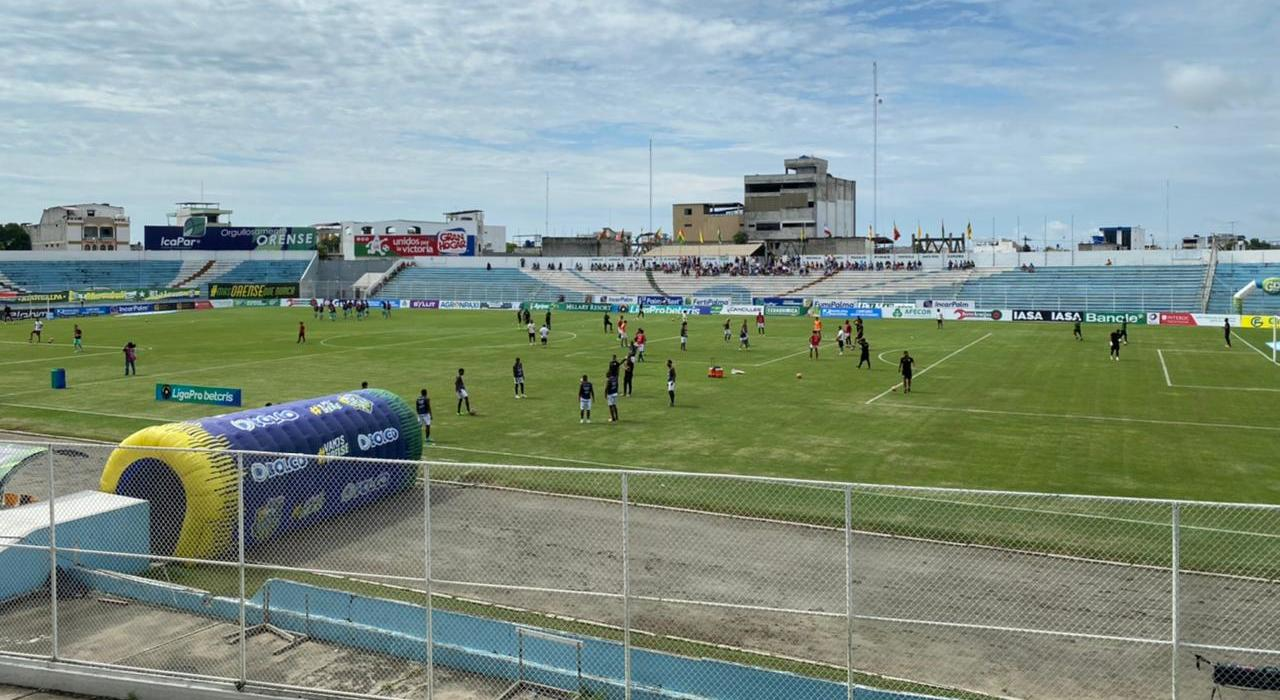

The 1975 Campeonato Ecuatoriano de Fútbol de la Serie A was the 17th national championship for football teams in Ecuador. LDU Quito successfully defended their title for their third overall.

== Teams ==
The number of teams for this season was expanded from eight to twelve. There would be no mid-season replacements.

Club	City
9 de Octubre	Guayaquil
América	Quito
Aucas	Quito
Barcelona	Guayaquil
Carmen Mora	Machala
Deportivo Cuenca	Cuenca
Deportivo Quito	Quito
El Nacional	Quito
Emelec	Guayaquil
LDU Portoviejo	Portoviejo
LDU Quito	Quito
Universidad Católica	Quito

== First stage ==
Pos	Team	Pld	W	D	L	GF	GA	GD	Pts	Qualification or relegation
1	LDU Quito	22	12	5	5	43	22	+21	29	Qualified to the Liguilla Final
2	Deportivo Cuenca	22	13	3	6	44	25	+19	29	Qualified to the Liguilla Final
3	Barcelona	22	9	9	4	40	27	+13	27	Qualified to the Liguilla Final
4	El Nacional	22	10	6	6	33	19	+14	26	
5	Emelec	22	9	4	9	28	30	−2	22	
6	América de Quito	22	9	3	10	42	44	−2	21	
7	Aucas	22	7	7	8	24	31	−7	21	
8	Universidad Católica	22	7	6	9	22	27	−5	20	
9	Deportivo Quito	22	5	9	8	22	28	−6	19	
10	LDU Portoviejo	22	4	10	8	20	41	−21	18	
11	9 de Octubre	22	7	3	12	28	36	−8	17	Relegated to the Serie B
12	Carmen Mora	22	5	5	12	22	38	−16	15	Relegated to the Serie B

Source: RSSSF - 1975 Serie A

== Second stage ==
Pos	Team	Pld	W	D	L	GF	GA	GD	Pts	Qualification or relegation
1	Deportivo Cuenca	18	11	3	4	35	14	+21	25	Qualified to the Liguilla Final
2	Aucas	18	9	3	6	25	17	+8	21	Qualified to the Liguilla Final
3	Universidad Católica	18	8	5	5	21	20	+1	21	Qualified to the Liguilla Final
4	Emelec	18	8	4	6	29	20	+9	20	
5	LDU Quito	18	7	6	5	25	19	+6	20	
6	El Nacional	18	7	6	5	27	21	+6	20	
7	Barcelona	18	8	3	7	21	25	−4	19	
8	América de Quito	18	5	5	8	17	26	−9	15	
9	Deportivo Quito	18	2	6	10	15	31	−16	10	Relegated to the Serie B
10	LDU Portoviejo	18	4	1	13	16	38	−22	9	Relegated to the Serie B

Source: RSSSF - 1975 Serie A

== Liguilla Final ==
Pos	Team	Pld	W	D	L	GF	GA	GD	Pts	Qualification
1	LDU Quito (C)	8	4	3	1	12	8	+4	14 (Note: Includes bonus points earned in the earlier stages: Deportivo Cuenca 5; LDU Quito 3; Aucas 2; Barcelona and Universidad Católica 1 each.)	1976 Copa Libertadores
2	Deportivo Cuenca	8	2	2	4	5	10	−5	11	1976 Copa Libertadores
3	Aucas	8	2	4	2	7	10	−3	10	
4	Barcelona	8	3	2	3	11	8	+3	9	
5	Universidad Católica	8	2	3	3	8	7	+1	8	

Source: RSSSF - 1975 Serie A
(C) Champions
Notes:

Campeonato Ecuatoriano de Fútbol
1975 champion

3rd title
