= Estadio El Ejido =

Multi-use stadium in Quito, Ecuador

- Estadio El Arbolito
- Interactive map of Estadio El Ejido
- Full name: Estadio El Ejido
- Location: Quito, Ecuador
- Operator: Concenración Deportiva de Pichincha
- Capacity: 20,000

Construction
- Groundbreaking: 1930
- Opened: 1932
- Closed: 1965
- Demolished: 1966

Tenants
- LDU Quito América de Quito Aucas Deportivo Quito: (1932–1962) (1939–1962) (1945–1962) (1955–1962)

Estadio El Ejido was a multi-use stadium in Quito, Ecuador that was primarily used for football matches. It served as the home ground for all the Quito-based, including Aucas, Deportivo Quito, and LDU Quito. It had a capacity for 20,000. Estadio Olímpico Atahualpa replaced it as the premier football stadium in the city in 1962. The stadium closed in 1965 and was subsequently demolished in 1966. Parque El Arbolito, located at Avenida 6 de Diciembre and Tarqui, is the location of where the stadium used to stand.
