= Miguel Parrales =

Ecuadorian footballer (born 1995)

Personal information
- Full name: Miguel Enrique Parrales Vera
- Date of birth: 26 December 1995 (age 30)
- Place of birth: Portoviejo, Ecuador
- Height: 1.81 m (5 ft 11 in)
- Position: Striker

Team information
- Current team: Barcelona S.C.
- Number: 33

Senior career*
Years	Team	Apps	(Gls)
2011	5 de Julio	10	(6)
2011-2012	Manta	16	(3)
2013	Independiente del Valle	12	(1)
2013-2014	Villarreal B	3	(0)
2014	El Nacional	17	(3)
2015	Portoviejo	22	(6)
2015-2016	Cruz Azul Hidalgo	20	(16)
2016	Universidad Católica del Ecuador	8	(0)
2017-2018	El Nacional	47	(17)
2019	Universidad Católica del Ecuador	6	(0)
2019	El Nacional	10	(5)
2020-2025	Guayaquil City	99	(33)
2024	→ LDU Quito (loan)	9	(0)
2024–2025	→ Orense (loan)	26	(16)
2025–	Barcelona S.C.	27	(4)
- * Club domestic league appearances and goals as of 22 March 2026

Miguel Enrique Parrales Vera (born 26 December 1995) is an Ecuadorian footballer who plays as a striker for Barcelona S.C.

== Career ==
For the second half of 2013–14, Parrales signed for the reserves of Spanish La Liga side Villarreal from Independiente del Valle in the Ecuadorian top flight.

In 2015, he signed for the reserves of Mexican top flight club Cruz Azul from Portoviejo in the Ecuadorian second division.

== Career statistics ==
=== Club ===
As of match played 21 December 2025.

Club	Division	Season	League		Cup		Continental		Total	
Club	Division	Season	Apps	Goals	Apps	Goals	Apps	Goals	Apps	Goals
5 de Julio	Segunda Categoría	2011	10	6	—		—		10	6
Manta	Ecuadorian Serie A	2012	16	3	—		—		16	3
Independiente del Valle	Ecuadorian Serie A	2013	12	1	—		—		12	1
Villarreal B	Primera Federación	2013-14	3	0	—		—		3	0
El Nacional	Ecuadorian Serie A	2014	17	3	—		—		17	3
Portoviejo	Ecuadorian Serie B	2015	22	6	—		—		22	6
Cruz Azul Hidalgo	Liga Premier de Ascenso	2015-16	20	16	—		—		20	16
Universidad Católica del Ecuador	Ecuadorian Serie A	2016	8	0	—		—		8	0
El Nacional	Ecuadorian Serie A	2017	25	10	—		—		25	10
El Nacional	Ecuadorian Serie A	2018	22	7	—		3	1	25	8
Universidad Católica del Ecuador	Ecuadorian Serie A	2019	6	0	1	0	3	0	10	0
Universidad Católica del Ecuador	Total		14	0	1	0	3	0	18	0
El Nacional	Ecuadorian Serie A	2019	10	5	0	0	—		10	5
El Nacional	Total		74	25	0	0	3	1	77	26
Guayaquil City	Ecuadorian Serie A	2020	17	1	—		—		17	1
Guayaquil City	Ecuadorian Serie A	2021	28	9	—		2	1	30	10
Guayaquil City	Ecuadorian Serie A	2022	28	7	1	1	—		29	8
Guayaquil City	Ecuadorian Serie A	2023	26	16	0	0	—		26	16
Guayaquil City	Total		99	33	1	1	2	1	102	35
LDU Quito	Ecuadorian Serie A	2024	9	0	0	0	1	0	10	0
Orense	Ecuadorian Serie A	2024	14	9	1	0	—		15	9
Orense	Ecuadorian Serie A	2025	12	7	0	0	1	0	13	7
Orense	Total		26	16	1	0	1	0	28	16
Barcelona S.C.	Ecuadorian Serie A	2025	21	4	1	0	0	0	22	4
Career total			326	110	4	1	10	2	340	113

== Honours ==
Individual

- Ecuadorian Serie A Top Goalscorer: 2023
