= Andrés Zanini =

Argentine footballer

Personal information
- Date of birth: 18 January 1997 (age 29)
- Place of birth: Tigre, Buenos Aires, Argentina
- Position: Defender

Team information
- Current team: Deportes La Serena (on loan from LDU Quito)

Youth career
- 2007–2017: Tigre

Senior career*
Years	Team	Apps	(Gls)
2017–2018	Tigre	0	(0)
2018–2024	Acassuso	69	(0)
2022	→ Güemes (loan)	31	(1)
2023	→ Chacarita Juniors (loan)	31	(4)
2024	→ LDU Quito (loan)	7	(0)
2025–	LDU Quito	0	(0)
2025–	→ Deportes La Serena (loan)	24	(2)
- * Club domestic league appearances and goals as of 15 December 2025

Raúl Andrés Zanini (born 18 January 1997) is an Argentine professional footballer who plays as a defender for Chilean club Deportes La Serena on loan from Ecuadorian club LDU Quito.

== Career ==
Zanini started his senior career with Primera División side Tigre; having joined their youth ranks in 2007. Although he didn't appear competitively for the club, he was once an unused substitute for a fixture with San Lorenzo on 2 April 2017. Zanini left at the end of the following 2017–18 campaign, signing for Acassuso of Primera B Metropolitana on 30 June 2018. His first appearance arrived in September versus Deportivo Español.

In 2025, Zanini moved to Chile and joined Deportes La Serena on a one-year loan from LDU Quito. He renewed for the 2026 season.

== Career statistics ==
As of 4 May 2024.

Appearances and goals by club, season and competition
Club	Season	League			Cup		Continental		Other		Total	
Club	Season	Division	Apps	Goals	Apps	Goals	Apps	Goals	Apps	Goals	Apps	Goals
Tigre	2016–17	Primera División	0	0	0	0	—		0	0	0	0
Tigre	2017–18	Primera División	0	0	0	0	—		0	0	0	0
Tigre	Total		0	0	0	0	—		0	0	0	0
Acassuso	2018–19	Primera B Metropolitana	29	0	1	0	—		0	0	30	0
Acassuso	2019–20	Primera B Metropolitana	10	0	0	0	—		0	0	10	0
Acassuso	2021	Primera B Metropolitana	30	0	0	0	—		0	0	30	0
Acassuso	Total		69	0	1	0	—		0	0	70	0
Güemes	2022	Primera Nacional	31	1	1	0	—		0	0	32	1
Chacarita Juniors	2023	Primera Nacional	31	4	1	0	—		0	0	32	4
L.D.U. Quito	2024	Primera B Metropolitana	1	0	0	0	—		0	0	1	0
Career total			132	5	3	0	—		0	0	135	5
