= Lucas Piovi =

Argentine footballer (born 1992)

Personal information
- Full name: Lucas Ezequiel Piovi
- Date of birth: 20 August 1992 (age 34)
- Place of birth: Buenos Aires, Argentina
- Height: 1.72 m (5 ft 8 in)
- Position: Defensive midfielder

Team information
- Current team: Estudiantes
- Number: 21

Youth career
- Vélez Sarsfield

Senior career*
Years	Team	Apps	(Gls)
2013–2014	Messina	3	(0)
2014	General Lamadrid	11	(0)
2015–2017	Fénix	52	(3)
2016–2017	→ Almagro (loan)	26	(2)
2017–2021	Almagro	45	(1)
2019–2020	→ Arsenal Sarandí (loan)	20	(1)
2020–2025	LDU Quito	121	(5)
2025–	Estudiantes	46	(1)
- * Club domestic league appearances and goals as of 17:32, 21 November 2026 (UTC)

Lucas Ezequiel Piovi (born 20 August 1992) is an Argentine professional footballer who plays as a defensive midfielder for Estudiantes.

== Career ==
Piovi started his career in the youth system of Vélez Sarsfield, prior to departing in 2013. Piovi subsequently joined Lega Pro Seconda Divisione side Messina, making his bow in Italian football on 13 October 2013 against Foggia. He made two further appearances, versus Poggibonsi and Chieti, as Messina won their group. On 30 June 2014, Piovi completed a return to Argentina by agreeing to sign for General Lamadrid. Eleven appearances followed in Primera C Metropolitana. 2015 saw Piovi join Primera B Metropolitana's Fénix. He scored his first senior goal on 4 October 2015 in a win away to Almagro.

In June 2016, Piovi was loaned by the aforementioned Almagro; a team now in Primera B Nacional. He scored two goals in twenty-six matches in 2016–17, which led to the club signing Piovi permanently. His first appearance as a full-time Almagro player arrived versus Ferro Carril Oeste on 23 September 2017. On 14 June 2019, Piovi agreed loan terms with Primera División side Arsenal de Sarandí. One goal, in a 3–3 draw with River Plate, occurred across twenty appearances for Arsenal. In July 2020, Piovi headed abroad to join Ecuadorian Serie A team L.D.U. Quito.

His debut for the Quito club came on 22 August against Aucas, while September would see him appear in the Copa Libertadores for the first time; featuring in wins over Binacional (twice) and São Paulo.

On 29 January 2025, Piovi returned to Argentina to join Estudiantes, signing a four-year contract.

== Personal life ==
Piovi's brother, Gonzalo, is also a professional footballer.

== Career statistics ==
As of 14 May 2024.

Club statistics
Club	Season	League			Cup		League Cup		Continental		Other		Total	
Club	Season	Division	Apps	Goals	Apps	Goals	Apps	Goals	Apps	Goals	Apps	Goals	Apps	Goals
Messina	2013–14	Lega Pro Seconda Divisione	3	0	0	0	—		—		0	0	3	0
General Lamadrid	2014	Primera C Metropolitana	11	0	0	0	—		—		0	0	11	0
Fénix	2015	Primera B Metropolitana	33	1	0	0	—		—		0	0	33	1
Fénix	2016	Primera B Metropolitana	19	2	0	0	—		—		0	0	19	2
Fénix	2016–17	Primera B Metropolitana	0	0	0	0	—		—		0	0	0	0
Fénix	Total		66	3	0	0	—		—		0	0	66	3
Almagro (loan)	2016–17	Primera B Nacional	26	2	0	0	—		—		0	0	26	2
Almagro	2017–18	Primera B Nacional	23	0	0	0	—		—		2 (Note: Appearance(s) in the Primera B Nacional play-offs)	0	25	0
Almagro	2018–19	Primera B Nacional	22	1	4	0	—		—		4	1	30	2
Almagro	2019–20	Primera B Nacional	0	0	0	0	—		—		0	0	0	0
Almagro	2020–21	Primera B Nacional	0	0	0	0	—		—		0	0	0	0
Almagro	Total		71	3	4	0	—		—		6	1	81	4
Arsenal de Sarandí (loan)	2019–20	Primera División	20	1	0	0	0	0	—		0	0	20	1
L.D.U. Quito	2020	Serie A	16	0	—		—		4 (Note: Appearance(s) in the Copa Libertadores)	0	—		20	0
L.D.U. Quito	2021	Serie A	25	0	—		—		8 (Note: Appearance(s) in the Copa Libertadores and Copa Sudamericana)	0	2 (Note: Appearance(s) in the Supercopa Ecuador)	0	35	0
L.D.U. Quito	2022	Serie A	25	0	2	0	—		8 (Note: Appearance(s) in the Copa Sudamericana)	0	—		35	0
L.D.U. Quito	2023	Serie A	27	0	—		—		13	1	—		40	1
L.D.U. Quito	2024	Serie A	9	2	—		—		5	0	2 (Note: Appearance(s) in the Recopa Sudamericana)	0	16	2
L.D.U. Quito	Total		102	2	2	0	—		38	1	4	0	146	3
Career total			259	9	6	0	0	0	38	1	10	1	313	11

== Honours ==
=== Club ===
LDU Quito

- Copa Sudamericana: 2023

Estudiantes

- Primera División: 2025 Clausura
- Trofeo de Campeones de la Liga Profesional: 2025
