= Luis Zárate (footballer) =

Paraguayan footballer (born 2000)

Personal information
- Full name: Luis Felipe Zárate Cardozo
- Date of birth: 25 February 2000 (age 26)
- Place of birth: Paraguay
- Height: 1.89 m (6 ft 2 in)
- Position: Centre-back

Team information
- Current team: Independiente del Valle
- Number: 2

Senior career*
Years	Team	Apps	(Gls)
2022–2023	Olimpia	44	(2)
2024–	Independiente del Valle	36	(5)

International career^{‡}
2017	Paraguay U17	7	(0)
2022–	Paraguay	1	(0)
- * Club domestic league appearances and goals as of 19 August 2025 ‡ National team caps and goals as of 09:59, 18 June 2023 (UTC)

Luis Felipe Zárate Cardozo (born 25 February 2000) is a Paraguayan professional footballer who plays as a centre-back for Ecuadorian Serie A club Independiente del Valle and the Paraguay national team.

== Club career ==
On 8 January 2024, Zárate signed for Ecuadorian Serie A club Independiente del Valle on a four-year contract.

== International career ==
On 2 June 2022, Zárate made his international debut for Paraguay in a 4–1 friendly defeat to Japan.

== Honours ==
Olimpia

- Paraguayan Primera División: 2022 Clausura
