= Sebastián González (footballer, born 2003) =

Ecuadorian footballer (born 2003)

Sebastían González
Personal information
- Full name: Sebastían González Baquero
- Date of birth: 6 June 2003 (age 23)
- Height: 1.77 m (5 ft 10 in)
- Position: Midfielder

Team information
- Current team: Shabab Al Ahli
- Number: 28

Youth career
- –2021: L.D.U. Quito

Senior career*
Years	Team	Apps	(Gls)
2021–2024	L.D.U. Quito	57	(4)
2024–	Shabab Al Ahli	4	(0)
2025	→ Al-Orooba (loan)	7	(0)

International career
2023–	Ecuador U20	11	(2)
- * Club domestic league appearances and goals as of 00:15 26 May 2026 (UTC)

Sebastían González Baquero (born 6 June 2003) is an Ecuadorian professional footballer who plays as a midfielder for Shabab Al Ahli.

== Early life ==
Gonzalez started playing football at a soccer school in Nayón when he was 7 years old. He joined L.D.U. Quito at under-12 level. He was a fan of the club growing up, and would watch them play with his dad.

== Club career ==
Gonzalez made his debut for L.D.U. Quito on 22 June 2021 against Delfín in the Supercopa Ecuador. He scored his first goal in a 2–2 draw against Manta Fútbol Club on 26 September 2021.

After establishing himself in the first team he was progress was halted by a shoulder injury in March 2022, that required surgery. Despite that, during the 2022 season he collected over 1,200 minutes, scored two goals, and was credited with two assists. He started the final of the 2023 2023 Copa Sudamericana which L.D.U. Quito won on penalties against Brazilian opponents Fortaleza.

In 2024 he signed on a free transfer for Dubai-based side Shabab Al Ahli Club.

== International career ==
In November 2022, he was called up for the first time to the Ecuador national team for a friendly match against Iraq. In January 2023, he was called up to the Ecuador U-20 side for the 2023 South American U-20 Championship. In May 2023, he was called up to the Ecuador under-20 side for the 2023 FIFA U-20 World Cup.

== Style of play ==
Gonzalez style of play in central midfield has been compared with Spanish great Sergio Busquets.

== Honours ==
Liga de Quito

- Serie A: 2023
- Copa Sudamericana: 2023
- Supercopa Ecuador: 2021
