= Álex Arce =

Paraguayan footballer (born 1995)

- Arce with Paraguay in 2026

Personal information
- Full name: Álex Adrián Arce Barrios
- Date of birth: 16 June 1995 (age 31)
- Place of birth: Carapeguá, Paraguay
- Height: 1.87 m (6 ft 2 in)
- Position: Striker

Team information
- Current team: Independiente Rivadavia
- Number: 9

Youth career
- Cerro Porteño

Senior career*
Years	Team	Apps	(Gls)
2017–2019	Cerro Porteño	1	(0)
2019	Rubio Ñu	22	(7)
2021–2023	Sportivo Ameliano	36	(10)
2023–2024	Independiente Rivadavia	36	(28)
2024–2025	LDU Quito	43	(31)
2025–	Independiente Rivadavia	29	(12)

International career^{‡}
2024–	Paraguay	19	(1)
- * Club domestic league appearances and goals as of 12 September 2026 ‡ National team caps and goals as of 2 October 2026

Álex Adrián Arce Barrios (born 16 June 1995) is a Paraguayan professional footballer who plays as a striker for Argentine club Independiente Rivadavia and the Paraguay national team.

== Early life ==
Arce came through the youth academy at Cerro Porteño and signed his first contract in 2015. However, he had to wait almost two years to make his debut in the top category and shortly afterwards suffered a cruciate ligament rupture. After recovering, his level was not the same and that is why he spent a lot of time training with the team's Reserve, until in 2019 he decided to leave to seek continuity in a minor league club.

== Club career ==
Arce played for Paraguayan side Sportivo Ameliano, helping the club achieve promotion.

== International career ==
Arce made his debut for the Paraguay national team on 7 June 2024 in a friendly against Peru at Estadio Monumental. He started the game and played 65 minutes in a 0–0 draw.

On 1 June 2026, he was named by head coach Gustavo Alfaro in Paraguay's 26-man squad for the 2026 FIFA World Cup.

== Style of play ==
Arce mainly operates as a striker and has been described as "stands out for kicking from outside the area with both legs, executing free kicks, dribbling at speed and As if that were not enough, his 187 centimeters and strength in jumping made him add a dangerous aerial game".

== Personal life ==
Arce is the son of Miriam Barrios.

== Career statistics ==
=== International ===
As of match played 2 October 2026

Appearances and goals by national team and year
National team	Year	Apps	Goals
Paraguay	2024	9	0
Paraguay	2025	4	1
Paraguay	2026	6	0
Total		19	1

List of international goals scored by Álex Arce
No.	Date	Venue	Opponent	Score	Result	Competition
1.	15 November 2025	Subaru Park, Chester, United States	United States	1–1	1–2	Friendly

== Honours ==
Cerro Porteño

- Primera División: 2017

Sportivo Ameliano

- Copa Paraguay: 2022
- Supercopa Paraguay: 2022

Independiente Rivadavia

- Primera B Nacional: 2023
- Copa Argentina: 2025

LDU Quito

- Serie A: 2024
- Supercopa Ecuador: 2025
