= Gabriel Villamil =

Bolivian footballer (born 2001)

Gabriel Villamíl
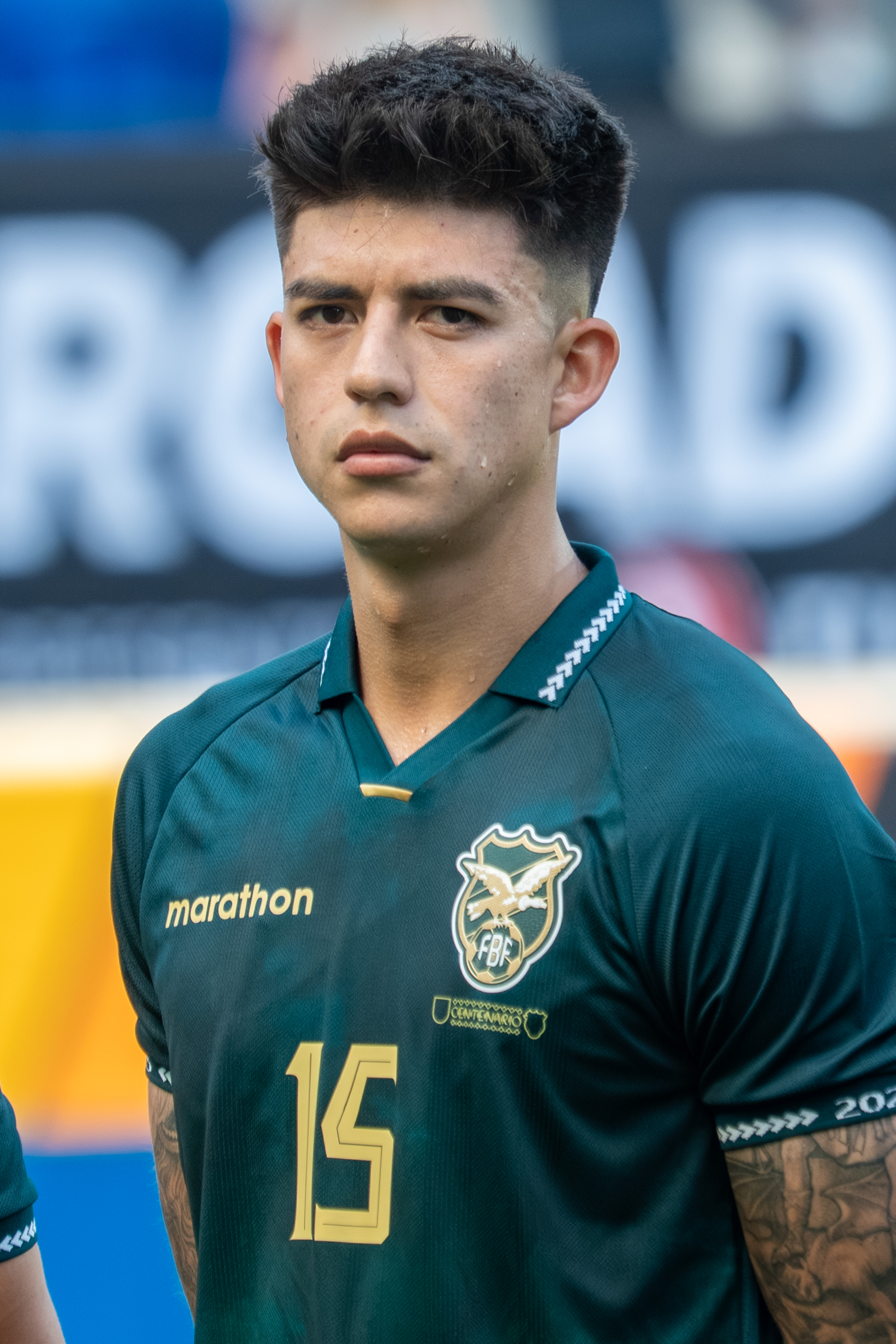
- Villamil in 2026

Personal information
- Full name: Gabriel Alejandro Villamil Cortez
- Date of birth: 28 June 2001 (age 25)
- Place of birth: Tarija, Bolivia
- Height: 1.79 m (5 ft 10 in)
- Position: Midfielder

Team information
- Current team: LDU Quito
- Number: 15

Youth career
- –2021: Bolívar

Senior career*
Years	Team	Apps	(Gls)
2018–2024	Bolívar	100	(13)
2024	→ LDU Quito (loan)	24	(4)
2025–	LDU Quito	58	(6)

International career^{‡}
2021–	Bolivia	39	(0)
- * Club domestic league appearances and goals as of 1 September 2026 ‡ National team caps and goals as of 23:13, 27 September 2026 (UTC)

Gabriel Alejandro Villamil Cortez (born 28 June 2001) is a Bolivian professional footballer who plays as a midfielder for Ecuadorian Serie A club LDU Quito and the Bolivia national team.

== International career ==
He made his debut for Bolivia national football team on 9 September 2021 in a World Cup qualifier against Argentina.

== Career statistics ==
=== Club ===
As of match played 1 September 2026

Appearances and goals by club, season and competition
Club	Season	League			Cup		Continental		Other		Total	
Club	Season	Division	Apps	Goals	Apps	Goals	Apps	Goals	Apps	Goals	Apps	Goals
Bolívar	2018	FBF División Profesional	2	0	0	0	—		—		2	0
Bolívar	2019	FBF División Profesional	1	0	0	0	—		—		1	0
Bolívar	2020	FBF División Profesional	2	0	0	0	0	0	—		2	0
Bolívar	2021	FBF División Profesional	27	2	0	0	5 (Note: One appearance in Copa Libertadores and four appearances in Copa Sudamericana)	0	—		32	2
Bolívar	2022	FBF División Profesional	41	5	0	0	3 (Note: Appearances in Copa Libertadores)	0	—		44	5
Bolívar	2023	FBF División Profesional	27	6	13	1	10	0	—		50	7
Bolívar	Total		100	13	13	1	18	0	—		131	14
LDU Quito (loan)	2024	LigaPro Serie A	30	1	0	0	6 (Note: Four appearances in Copa Libertadores, two appearances in Copa Sudamericana)	0	2 (Note: Appearances in Recopa Sudamericana)	0	38	1
LDU Quito	2025	LigaPro Serie A	35	6	3	0	12	0	1 (Note: Appearance in Supercopa Ecuador)	0	50	6
LDU Quito	2026	LigaPro Serie A	18	0	1	0	6	1	—		25	1
LDU Quito	Total		53	6	4	0	18	1	1	0	75	1
Career total			182	21	17	1	42	1	3	0	244	23

=== International ===
As of match played 27 September 2026

Appearances and goals by national team and year
National team	Year	Apps	Goals
Bolivia	2021	1	0
Bolivia	2022	4	0
Bolivia	2023	8	0
Bolivia	2024	12	0
Bolivia	2025	11	0
Bolivia	2026	4	0
Total		39	0

== Honours ==
Bolívar

- Bolivian Primera División (2): 2019-A, 2022-A

Liga de Quito

- Ecuadorian Serie A (1): 2024
