= LDU Quito =

Ecuadorian professional football club

- Full name: Liga Deportiva Universitaria
- Nicknames: Rey de Copas Ecuatoriano (Ecuadorian King of Cups); Albos (The Whites); Los Reyes; Centrales; La Bordadora; Los Merengues (The Merengues); La U (The U); Los Universitarios (The Universitaries)
- Founded: 23 October 1918; 108 years ago, as Club Universitario
- Ground: Estadio Rodrigo Paz Delgado (Casa Blanca)
- Capacity: 41,575
- Honorary President: Rodrigo Paz
- President: Isaac Álvarez
- Manager: Gustavo Álvarez
- League: Ecuadorian Serie A
- 2025: First stage: 3rd of 16; First hexagonal: 2nd of 6
- Website: www.ldu.com.ec
| Home colours | Away colours | Third colours |

Liga Deportiva Universitaria (Spanish pronunciation: [ˈliɣa ðepoɾˈtiβawniβeɾsiˈtaɾja]), commonly known as Liga de Quito or LDU Quito is an Ecuadorian professional football club based in Quito. They play in the Serie A, the highest level of the Ecuadorian professional football league. They play their home games at the Estadio Rodrigo Paz Delgado, more commonly referred to as Casa Blanca. Rival clubs include Quito-based clubs El Nacional, Deportivo Quito, Aucas and Universidad Católica.

Liga Deportiva Universitaria de Quito has its roots in the semi-pro sports teams in 1918 competing as "Universitario" at the Central University of Ecuador, and was officially founded on 11 January 1930. They began making an impact in the provincial leagues, winning nine Pichincha titles (six in the professional era). Their provincial success continued into the national league, where they have won 13 national title (4th overall) having won their most recent title in 2024.

Liga Deportiva Universitaria de Quito is the most successful Ecuadorian club in international competitions. The team was the first, and currently the only, Ecuadorian club to win the Copa Libertadores (2008), they have won two Copas Sudamericanas (2009 and 2023), and two Recopas Sudamericanas (2009 and 2010). They are one of only six teams—Boca Juniors, Independiente, River Plate, Internacional and São Paulo being the other five— to have achieved the CONMEBOL treble, winning all three continental club tournaments. LDU is the only team to win all three mentioned cups one after another between 2008 and 2010 causing them to be rated as the best South American team of 2008 and 2009. Additionally, Liga de Quito was the runner-up at the 2008 FIFA Club World Cup.

== History ==
=== Creation and early years (1918–1954) ===
Liga de Quito's roots lie in a semi-pro sports team based out of the Central University of Ecuador on 23 October 1918, headed by Dr. César Jácome Moscoso. Under the leadership of Dr. Bolívar León, the club was officially founded on 11 January 1930. In the early days, Liga participated in a variety of disciplines, including football, basketball, athletics, boxing, baseball, swimming, ping-pong, and chess. The club's initial budget was about 500 sucres. The first team's players were students from the university, and had to pay for their own uniforms, medicines, and expenses. Dr. León designed the first uniform, placing its crest, a white "U" on an inverted red and blue triangle, on a white shirt, honoring the team's beginnings at the university. Amongst Liga's first players were Carlos Andrade Marín, Oswaldo Mosquera, Alfonso Cevallos, Alfonso Troya and "El Mono" Icaza.

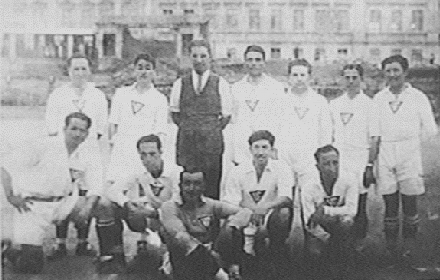
1930 squad

In 1932, Liga won their first football title at an amateur Pichincha tournament; there was no national amateur league at the time. Five teams participated: Liga, Gladiador, Gimnástico, Atlético, and Cleveland. Liga won all their games, and in the final match, played at the Estadio El Ejido, defeated Gladiador by a score of 4–0. Playing for Liga were Jorge Zapater, Eduardo Flores, Alfonso Cevallos, César González, Jorge Vallarino, Jorge Naranjo, Bolívar "Ñato" León, Alejandro Dávalos, Humberto Yáñez, Humberto Freire, and Ernesto García, with Bolívar León as coach. Liga would also win amateur titles in 1952 and 1953, before the league turned professional the following year.

=== Beginning of professional era (1954–1966) ===
By 1955, the amateur football association in Pichincha had evolved into the Asociación de Fútbol No Amateur de Pichincha (Pichincha Non-Amateur Football Association), which subsequently organized a professional league for their member clubs from Quito and Ambato. The inaugural Campeonato Professional Interandino (Inter-Andean Professional Championship) was held in 1954. Liga won the league's first title, under the management of Lucho Vásquez. The club finished as the runner-up in 1955 and 1956, before winning again in 1958 under Argentine Roberto Ortega. The club won four titles during the 1960s, in 1960, 1961, 1966, and 1967, and finished as runner-up in 1962, 1963, and 1964. Liga had the most successful run of any professional Interandino-era club, accumulating a total of 6 regional titles.

In 1957 and from 1960 onwards, winning the Interandino title qualified a team to participate in a tournament which crowned a national champion of Ecuadorian professional football. Liga first participated in 1960, after winning the Interandino cup that year. The team's three subsequent Interandino victories did not lead to a national title; the club's best performance was a third-place finish in 1964.

Foreign players became integral to the squad during the 1960s. International players included Paulista José Gomes Nogueira in 1960, Chilean Román Soto in 1961, and Paraguayan José María Ocampo in 1966.

=== National success, relegation, and comeback (1967–1989) ===
In 1967, all regional tournaments were discontinued in favor of a single national tournament. Liga won its first national championship in 1969, one year after joining the new league, under the leadership of Brazilian José Gomes Nogueira. Liga's ranks at the time included Francisco "El Tano" Bertocchi, Jorge Tapia, Armando "Tito" Larrea, Carlos Ríos, Santiago Alé, Enrique Portilla, and Ramiro Tobar. Liga's victory granted the club its first Copa Libertadores participation in 1970, where it reached the second phase of the tournament, with '"El Tano" Bertocchi tying for the title of top goalscorer of the tournament.

Liga's success was short-lived; in 1972, the club finished seventh of the eight teams participating in the Serie A. At the time, only four teams from the province of Pichincha could play in the top flight. As the worst-performing Pichincha team, Liga took part in a playoff match against the best-performing Pichincha team in Serie B, Universidad Católica, for a berth in the next season's Serie A tournament. Liga lost the match, relegating it to Serie B for the 1973 season, at the end of which the club faced a second relegation, down to the Segunda Categoria of Ecuadorian football. The club was able to gain promotion back to the Serie B in time for the 1974 season. After winning the first stage of the 1974 Serie B, Liga returned to the Serie A after two years in the lower flights. Liga's rise continued as the team won their second national title after defeating El Nacional. The success was followed by another title win in 1975, marking Liga's first back-to-back national championships. Liga's 1975 and 1976 Copa Libertadores participations saw the squad twice reach the semi-finals of the continental tournament. Key to Liga's success were players Polo Carrera, Oscar Zubía, Jorge Tapia, Gustavo Tapia, Walter Maesso, Juan Carlos Gómez, Ramiro Tobar, Juan José Pérez, and Roberto Sussman, along with Colombian coach Leonel Montoya. Liga would round out the decade with a runners-up finish in 1977, allowing for another Copa Libertadores participation in 1978.

In contrast to the team's good performances after coming back from relegation, the 1980s were a dismal decade for the club. Liga's best performance during that period was a runners-up finish in 1981, and a subsequent Copa Libertadores participation in 1982. Player Paulo Cesar was the top Serie A goalscorer in 1981.

=== Rise to powerhouse status (1990–present) ===
In the two decades since 1990, Liga enjoyed a period of domestic success. They started the 1990s with a national title, edging established powerhouse Barcelona. Before the end of the decade, Liga won two more national titles in 1998 and 1999. The 1998 title was won the year Liga inaugurated their new stadium, La Casa Blanca, and ended with an impressive 7–0 win over Emelec.

In 2000, the club experienced a period of crisis. This crisis resulted in a poor performance in the national league and Liga was relegated to the Serie B that season. The club managed to bounce back from relegation and won the Serie B in 2001 to gain promotion back to the Serie A. Two years later in 2003, Liga won their 7th national title. Liga added another five more national titles in 2005 Apertura, 2007, 2010, 2018, 2023 and the most recent in 2024 to bring their current count to thirteen, placing them third all-time domestically (tied with El Nacional).

==== International success (2008–present) ====
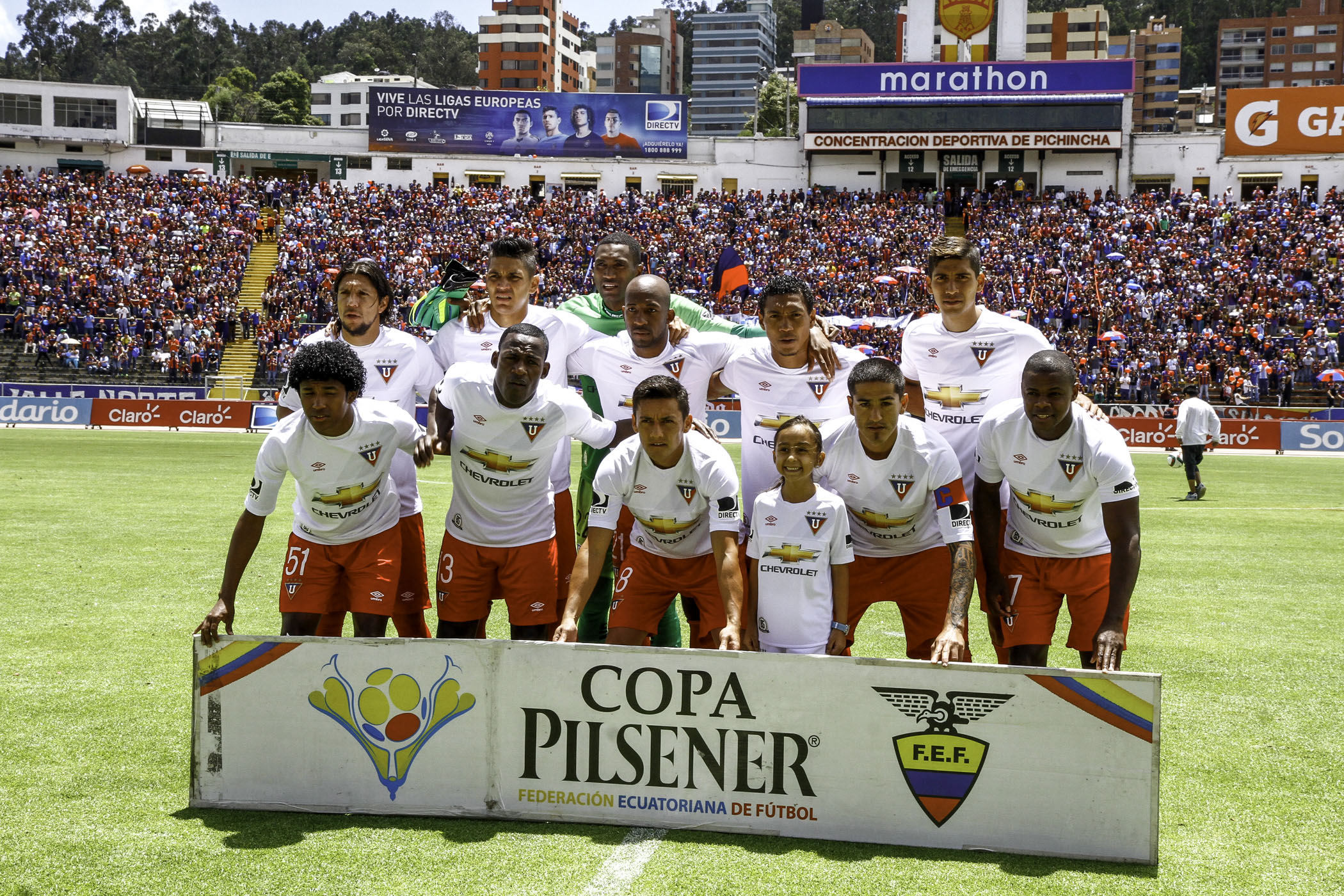
LDU players

Prior to 2008, Liga had participated in sixteen international/continental tournaments. Their best success in South American football at the beginning of 2008 was reaching the semi-finals of the 1975 Copa Libertadores, the 1976 Copa Libertadores, and the 2004 Copa Sudamericana.

On 2 July 2008, Liga became the first-ever Ecuadorian team to win the Copa Libertadores, after defeating Fluminense in the finals on penalties 3–1, after being level on aggregate 5–5 at the end of extra time. Liga's Libertadores title gave the club an automatic berth into the semi-finals of the 2008 FIFA Club World Cup, becoming the first non-Argentine or Brazilian CONMEBOL squad to participate in the tournament. Liga defeated Pachuca by 2–0 in their semi-final match, advancing to the final against 2007–08 UEFA Champions League winners Manchester United, where Liga lost on December 21 in Yokohama, Japan, by a score of 1–0.

In June 2009, Liga, as the 2008 Copa Libertadores champion, participated in the 2009 Recopa Sudamericana against the 2008 Copa Sudamericana champion Internacional of Porto Alegre, Brazil. Liga won the first leg, played at Beira Rio stadium in Porto Alegre, by a score of 1–0, with a goal from Claudio Bieler. In the second leg, played at La Casa Blanca, Liga won 3–0 with goals from Carlos Espínola, Claudio Bieler, and Enrique Vera. The 2009 Recopa title was Liga's second international title, as well as being the second international title ever achieved by any Ecuadorian club.

Soon after the Recopa victory, Liga earned their third international trophy in their history, the 2009 Copa Sudamericana. In a rematch of the 2008 Copa Libertadores Final, Liga edged Fluminense 5–4 on aggregate over two legs by winning impressively at home 5–1 and losing 3–0 in Rio de Janeiro. On their way to the finals, they disposed of important clubs, such as Libertad of Paraguay, Argentine clubs Lanús and Vélez Sarsfield, and Uruguayan club River Plate.

With the Copa Sudamericana title, Liga technically achieved a CONMEBOL treble (Copa Libertadores, Copa Sudamericana, Recopa Sudamericana), but since the three titles were not all achieved in the same calendar year, (they were achieved in 17 months), the club narrowly fell short of a traditional treble; Liga would've achieved the treble if they won the 2008 Copa Sudamericana, and even though their Recopa Sudamericana win was in 2009, the treble would have still counted because those were the three back-to-back CONMEBOL tournaments.

Additionally, they qualified to play in the 2010 Recopa Sudamericana against Argentine club Estudiantes de La Plata. They won the first leg 2–1 with both goals coming from Hernán Barcos. The win at home in the first leg was enough to secure the title after both teams drew the second leg 0–0. With this title, Liga became the third team to win back-to-back Recopa Sudamericanas. The victory gave the club the right to play in the 2010 Suruga Bank Championship, which was won by FC Tokyo 4–3 on penalties after a 2–2 draw in August 2010.

Liga also reached the 2011 Copa Sudamericana Finals, which they lost to Universidad de Chile by a global score of 4–0.

In 2023 Liga won its second Copa Sudamericana after defeating Fortaleza Esporte Clube on penalties 4–3, following a 1–1 draw.

== Stadium ==
Over the years, Liga has used four stadiums for their home stadium. Their first stadium was Estadio Universitario César Aníbal Espinoza, on the grounds of the Universidad Central del Ecuador. In 1932, Liga moved to Estadio El Ejido, which a number of other teams in Quito used as a home ground. In 1962, Liga moved to Estadio Olímpico Atahualpa, along with a number of other teams from the city. They would use that stadium as a home ground until 1996.

In 1997, LDU inaugurated their own stadium, Estadio Casa Blanca, in the northern part of the city. It is the largest stadium in Quito in terms of capacity, and the second largest in Ecuador after the Estadio Monumental Banco Pichincha in Guayaquil. The stadium officially opened on 6 March 1997, in a match against Brazilian club Atlético Mineiro. Liga won the match 3–1.

Since its inauguration, the Casa Blanca has been home to Liga's greatest period of success and is often unbeatable at the stadium. They have had six victory laps (vueltas olimpicas) in the stadium since it was inaugurated for five national titles and one international title (two national title and three international titles were sealed elsewhere in the same time period).

== Supporters ==
LDU Quito is one of the most supported clubs in Ecuador. According to a recent study, Liga has the largest fanbase in Quito. Their ultras have earned the nicknamed the "Muerte Blanca'' (The White Death).

== Rivalries ==
LDU Quito has formed a number of footballing rivalries throughout its history. Their longest-standing rivalry is with Aucas, a southern Quito club founded in 1945, making the two clubs the oldest in the city still in existence. Liga-Aucas matches are referred to as El Superclásico de Quito (The Quito Super Derby), and the rivalry traces its history back to the first match on 1 February 1945, which ended in a 1–1 tie. A second match, played on February 18, 1945, ended in a 2–2 draw. At the end of the 90 minutes, the game was 2–1; the timekeeper ended the match, but the referee did not notice, allowing the game to continue into extra time, where Aucas equalized the score. In the past two decades an intense rivalry has also formed with Guayaquil based club Barcelona S. C. with which it competes for the title of most successful team, given that Liga has already won 22 official trophies, but Barcelona still has more national championships.

=== Rivalry with El Nacional ===
Due to the little importance that the Superclásico de Quito has at present, this party has started to position itself as the most important of the capital. Liga de Quito and El Nacional star in the team match Quito with more national titles, 13 for Liga de Quito and 13 for El Nacional. The first match was in 1964 which ended with an El Nacional 1–0 victory. Both teams played the finals of 1974 and 1999 by national championship, resulting Liga de Quito champion both times.

=== Rivalry with Deportivo Quito ===
In the absence of intense rivalry with Aucas and El Nacional, Liga and its fans developed a strong rivalry with Deportivo Quito. in the 2000s. The Clásico Capitalino (Capital Derby) was the most important game in Quito and was considered a "must win" game of the season. In 2008 and 2009, the match had national championship implications that exacerbated the rivalry to a greater degree. This rivalry has largely been put on hold since Deportivo Quito's relegation to the third tier of Ecuador's football league in 2015, where it has been playing ever since.

=== Rivalry with Fluminense ===
Since Liga's win over Brazilian team Fluminense F. C. in the 2008 Copa Libertadores final and the Copa Sudamericana final of the following year, a strong international rivalry has developed between the two teams. This rivalry reached new heights when the two teams met on a third international final for the 2024 Recopa Sudamericana, which was won by Fluminense. This has been the only case of two CONMEBOL teams facing each other on each of the three continental tournaments.

== Current squad ==
As of 22 November 2026

Note: Flags indicate national team as defined under FIFA eligibility rules; some limited exceptions apply. Players may hold more than one non-FIFA nationality.

| No. | Pos. | Nation | Player |
|---|---|---|---|
| 1 | GK | ECU | Gonzalo Valle |
| 3 | DF | ECU | Richard Mina |
| 4 | DF | HAI | Ricardo Adé |
| 5 | MF | ECU | Sebastián González |
| 7 | MF | ARG | Lucas Rodríguez |
| 8 | MF | PER | Jesús Pretell |
| 10 | FW | ECU | Alexander Alvarado |
| 11 | FW | ECU | Michael Estrada |
| 12 | GK | ECU | Alexis Villa |
| 13 | FW | ECU | Janner Corozo |
| 14 | DF | ECU | José Quintero |
| 15 | MF | BOL | Gabriel Villamíl |
| 16 | FW | BRA | Deyverson |
| 20 | MF | CHI | Fernando Cornejo |

| No. | Pos. | Nation | Player |
|---|---|---|---|
| 21 | MF | ECU | Ederson Castillo |
| 22 | GK | ECU | Alexander Domínguez |
| 23 | FW | ECU | Yerlin Quiñónez |
| 26 | MF | ECU | Iván Zambrano |
| 28 | DF | ECU | Josué Cuero |
| 30 | DF | URU | Gian Franco Allala |
| 31 | MF | ECU | Juanse Rodríguez |
| 33 | DF | ECU | Leonel Quiñónez |
| 44 | DF | ECU | Luis Segovia |
| 57 | DF | ARG | Marcelo Weigandt (on loan from Boca Juniors) |
| 67 | DF | ECU | José Carabalí |
| 77 | FW | ECU | Kevin Velasco |
| 99 | MF | ECU | Cristian Tobar |

=== Out on loan ===
Note: Flags indicate national team as defined under FIFA eligibility rules; some limited exceptions apply. Players may hold more than one non-FIFA nationality.

| No. | Pos. | Nation | Player |
|---|---|---|---|
| 5 | MF | ECU | Kevin Minda (at FBC Melgar until 30 June 2027) |
| 19 | FW | ECU | Michael Bermúdez (at Orense until 31 December 2026) |
| 25 | MF | ECU | Madison Julio (at Guayaquil City until 31 December 2026) |

| No. | Pos. | Nation | Player |
|---|---|---|---|
| 32 | DF | ECU | Daniel de la Cruz (at Nacional until 30 June 2027) |
| — | FW | ECU | Jairón Charcopa (at Atlante until 31 December 2026) |

== Notable players ==
=== Top scorers ===
LDU has had six players become the season top-scorer in the Serie A, five players become the top-scorer in the Campeaonato Profesional Interandino, three players as the top-scorer in the Copa Libertadores, one player become the top-scorer in the Copa Sudamericana, and one player become the top-scorer in the Copa CONMEBOL. The team's all-time top scorer is Polo Carrera with 92 goals.

| N.° | Player | Seasons | Goals |
|---|---|---|---|
| 1 | (Ecuador) Polo Carrera | 1960–1965, 1966–1967, 1975–1977, 1979–1980, 1982–1983 y 1984. | 92 |
| 2 | (Argentina) Hernán Barcos | 2010–2011 y 2017–2018. | 91 |
| 3 | (Ecuador) José Moreno | 1981–1987. | 87 |
| 4 | (Argentina) (Ecuador) Claudio Bieler | 2008–2009 y 2011–2012. | 71 |
| 5 | (Ecuador) Patricio Hurtado | 1994–2000 y 2002. | 69 |
| 6 | (Ecuador) Patricio Urrutia | 2003–2009 y 2010–2013. | 59 |
| 7 | (Ecuador) Diego Herrera | 1985, 1989–1993 y 1995–1996. | 55 |
| 8 | (Ecuador) Franklin Salas | 2000–2006 y 2007–2010. | 52 |
| 9 | (Uruguay) Carlos Berrueta | 1990–1992 y 1994. | 50 |
| 10 | (Colombia) Cristian Martínez Borja | 2018–2019 y 2020–2021. | 49 |

Serie A

- (Brazil) Pio Coutinho (1966, 13 goals)
- (Uruguay) Francisco Bertocchi (1969, 26 goals)
- (Brazil) Paulo César (1981, 25 goals)
- (Brazil) Janio Pinto (1988, 18 goals)
- (Ecuador) Diego Herrera (1993, 21 goals)
- (Argentina) (Ecuador) Claudio Bieler (2009, 22 goals)
- (Argentina) Hernán Barcos (2017, 21 goals)
- (Colombia) Cristian Martínez Borja (2020, 24 goals)
- (Paraguay) Álex Arce (2024, 28 goals)

Interandino

- (Ecuador) Felipe Andrade (1954, 8 goals)
- (Ecuador) Armando Larrea (1963, 7 goals)
- (Argentina) Epifanio Brizuela (1963, 7 goals)
- (Colombia) Nelson Cabezas (1963, 7 goals)
- (Brazil) Pio Coutinho (1967, 7 goals)

Copa Libertadores

- (Uruguay) Francisco Bertocchi (1970, 9 goals)
- (Ecuador) Agustín Delgado (2006, 5 goals)
- (Ecuador) Patricio Urrutia (2006, 5 goals)

Copa Sudamericana

- (Argentina) (Ecuador) Claudio Bieler (2009, 8 goals)

Copa CONMEBOL

- (Uruguay) Carlos Morales (1998, 4 goals)

=== World Cup players ===
The following players were chosen to represent their country at the FIFA World Cup while contracted to LDU Quito.

- (Ecuador) Alfonso Obregón (2002)
- (Ecuador) Carlos Tenorio (2002)
- (Ecuador) Paúl Ambrosi (2006)
- (Ecuador) Agustín Delgado (2006)
- (Ecuador) Giovanny Espinoza (2006)
- (Ecuador) Édison Méndez (2006)
- (Ecuador) Cristian Mora (2006)
- (Ecuador) Néicer Reasco (2006)
- (Ecuador) Patricio Urrutia (2006)
- (Paraguay) Enrique Vera (2010)
- (Ecuador) Alexander Dominguez (2014, 2022)
- (Haiti) Ricardo Adé (2026)
- (Ecuador) Gonzalo Valle (2026)

== Managers ==
=== Noted managers ===
The following managers won at least one trophy when in charge of LDU Quito, in addition to the first manager:

- (Ecuador) Bolívar León (first manager)
- (Ecuador) César Jácome Moscoso (won the 1932 amateur Pichincha)
- (Ecuador) Luis Vásquez (won the 1952 & 1953 amateur Pichincha and the 1954 Interandino)
- (Argentina) (Ecuador) Roberto Eliseo Ortega (won the 1958 Interandino)
- (Brazil) José Gomes Nogueira (won the 1960 Interandino and the 1969 Serie A)
- (Chile) Román Soto Vergara (won the 1961 Interandino)
- (Ecuador) José María Ocampo (won the 1966 & 1967 Interandino)
- (Colombia) Leonel Montoya (won promotion in 1973 and won the 1974 and 1975 Serie A)
- (Ecuador) Polo Carrera (won the 1990 Serie A)
- (Brazil) Paulo Massa (won the 1998 Serie A)
- (Chile) Manuel Pellegrini (won the 1999 Serie A)
- (Argentina) Julio Asad (won the 2001 Serie B and promotion to the Serie A)
- (Uruguay) Jorge Fossati (first tenure, won the 2003 Serie A; second tenure, won the 2009 Recopa Sudamericana and 2009 Copa Sudamericana)
- (Peru) Juan Carlos Oblitas (won the 2005 Apertura)
- (Argentina) Edgardo Bauza (first tenure, won the 2007 Serie A and 2008 Copa Libertadores; second tenure, won the 2010 Recopa Sudamericana and the 2010 Serie A)
- (Uruguay) Pablo Repetto (won the 2018 Serie A, won the 2018-19 Copa Ecuador and won the 2020 Supercopa Ecuador)
- (Argentina) Gabriel Di Noia (won the 2021 Supercopa Ecuador)
- (Argentina) Luis Zubeldía (won the 2023 Serie A, won the 2023 Copa Sudamericana)
- (Argentina) Pablo Sánchez (won the 2024 Serie A)

== Honours ==
LDU is the most successful club in the history of Ecuadorian football, with nine regional titles, thirteen national titles, and five international titles. Liga won three amateur titles in the Interandino amateur era, tying them for third overall with Gimnástico. In the Interandino's professional era, Liga won six titles, which makes them the most successful team. Nationally, the club has won 13 national titles, the last one in 2024. Their national title count places them fourth overall behind Barcelona with 16 titles, Emelec with 14 titles and tied with El Nacional, with 13 titles each. Liga is the Ecuadorian club who have won the most international titles, with five of them.

L.D.U. Quito honours
| Type | Competition | Titles | Seasons |
|---|---|---|---|
| National | Serie A | 13 | 1969, 1974, 1975, 1990, 1998, 1999, 2003, 2005 Apertura, 2007, 2010, 2018, 2023, 2024 |
| National | Serie B | 2 | 1974 E1, 2001 |
| National | Copa Ecuador | 1 | 2019 |
| National | Supercopa Ecuador | 3 | 2020, 2021, 2025 |
| International | Copa Libertadores | 1 | 2008 |
| International | Copa Sudamericana | 2 | 2009, 2023 |
| International | Recopa Sudamericana | 2 | 2009, 2010 |

- record

=== Regional ===
- Campeonato Amateur del Fútbol de Pichincha
  - Winners (3): 1932, 1952, 1953
- Campeonato Olímpico Universitario
  - Winners (1): 1945
- Copa Presidente de la República Alfredo Baquerizo Moreno
  - Winners (1): 1919 (Club Universitario)
- Campeonato Professional Interandino
  - Winners (6): 1954, 1958, 1960, 1961, 1966, 1967
- Segunda Categoría de Pichincha
  - Winners (1): 1973

== Statistics ==
| Competition | Part | Pld | W | D | L | GF | GA | GD | Pts | Champion | Runner-up | Other info |
National
| Serie A | 60 | 2149 | 918 | 604 | 627 | 3242 | 2464 | +778 | 3358 | 13 | 6 | 4th all-time, Champion (13 times) |
| Copa Ecuador | 1 | 10 | 4 | 4 | 2 | 15 | 6 | +9 | 16 | 1 | 0 | Best: Champion (2019) |
| Supercopa Ecuador | 2 | 3 | 2 | 1 | 0 | 6 | 3 | +3 | 7 | 2 | 0 | Best: Champion (2020. 2021) |
International
| Copa Libertadores | 20 | 161 | 62 | 36 | 63 | 238 | 228 | +10 | 204 | 1 | 0 | Best: Champion (2008) |
| Copa Sudamericana | 13 | 80 | 38 | 16 | 26 | 123 | 95 | +28 | 130 | 2 | 1 | Best: Champion (2009, 2023) |
| Recopa Sudamericana | 3 | 6 | 4 | 1 | 1 | 7 | 3 | +4 | 13 | 2 | 1 | Best: Champion (2009, 2010) |
| FIFA Club World Cup | 1 | 2 | 1 | 0 | 1 | 2 | 1 | +1 | 3 | 0 | 1 | Best: Runner-up (2008) |
| Copa Suruga Bank | 1 | 1 | 0 | 1 | 0 | 2 | 2 | 0 | 1 | 0 | 1 | Best: Runner-up (2010) |
| Copa CONMEBOL | 1 | 4 | 2 | 1 | 1 | 8 | 7 | +1 | 7 | 0 | 0 | Best: Quarterfinals (1998) |

Note: All statistics are current as of the end of their last participation.

== See also ==
- Central University of Ecuador
