= 2020 Liga Deportiva Universitaria de Quito season =

L.D.U. Quito
2020 season
- President: Guillermo Romero
- Manager: Pablo Repetto
- Stadium: Estadio Rodrigo Paz Delgado
- LigaPro: Runner-up
- Conmebol Libertadores: Round of 16
- Supercopa Ecuador: Champions (1st title)
- Top goalscorer: League: Cristian Martínez (24 goals); All: Cristian Martínez (27 goals)
Home colours	Away colours	Third colours

Liga Deportiva Universitaria de Quito's 2020 season was the club's 90th year of existence, the 67th year in professional football, and the 59th in the top level of professional football in Ecuador.

== Club ==
=== Personnel ===
President: Guillermo Romero
Honorary President: Rodrigo Paz
President of the Executive Commission: Esteban Paz
Sporting manager: Santiago Jácome

=== Coaching staff ===
Manager: Pablo Repetto
Assistant manager: Óscar Quagliatta, Joaquin Casales
Physical trainer: Marcelo Cabezas
Goalkeeper trainer: Luis Preti

=== Kits ===
Supplier: Puma
Sponsor(s): Banco Pichincha, Discover, GOL TV, Pilsener

Home
Home
alternate 1
Away
Third

Type	Shirt	Shorts	Socks	Additional information
Home	White	White	White	
Home alternate 1	White	Green	White	Worn on August 29 (vs Orense)
Away	Green	Green	Green	
Third	Black	Black	Black	

== Squad information ==
Num	Pos	Nat.	Player	Age	Since	App	Goals	Notes
1	GK	ECU	Leonel Nazareno	25	2015	26	0	
2	DF	ECU	Joel Ventura	19	2019	1	0	
3	DF	ECU	Edilson Cabeza	17	2020	0	0	
4	DF	ECU	Luis Caicedo	27	2019	10	0	
5	MF	ARG	Lucas Villarruel	29	2020	0	0	
6	DF	ECU	Luis Ayala	26	2019	13	0	
7	MF	ECU	Édison Vega	29	2016	126	1	
8	MF	ECU	Jordy Alcívar	20	2018	9	0	
9	FW	ECU	Ronny Medina	24	2020	0	0	
10	MF	ECU	Junior Sornoza	25	2020	0	0	
11	MF	ECU	Billy Arce	21	2020	0	0	
12	GK	ECU	Erik Viveros	23	2017	4	0	
13	DF	ECU	Pedro Perlaza	28	2020	0	0	
14	DF	ECU	José Quintero	29	2015	156	11	
15	DF	ECU	Franklin Guerra	27	2018	71	3	
16	MF	ECU	Davinson Jama	21	2020	0	0	
17	FW	ECU	Marcos Caicedo	28	2020	0	0	
18	MF	ARG	Ezequiel Piovi	28	2020	0	0	
19	FW	COL	Cristian Martínez	31	2018	41	7	
20	DF	ECU	Christian Cruz	27	2018	53	0	
21	DF	ECU	Andersson Ordóñez	25	2018	23	0	
22	GK	ARG	Adrián Gabbarini	34	2018	76	0	
23	MF	URU	Matías Zunino	29	2020	0	0	
24	DF	ECU	Moisés Corozo	27	2020	0	0	
25	MF	ECU	Stalin Valencia	16	2020	0	0	
26	MF	ECU	Jhojan Julio	21	2016	99	14	
27	FW	URU	Rodrigo Aguirre	25	2019	22	12	
28	MF	ECU	Joseph Espinoza	19	2019	1	0	
29	MF	ECU	Adolfo Muñoz	22	2019	22	1	
30	MF	ECU	Jefferson Troya	18	2020	0	0	
31	MF	ECU	Jefferson Arce	19	2019	1	0	
32	GK	ECU	Julio Cárdenas	19	2020	0	0	

Note: Caps and goals are of the national league and are current as of the beginning of the season.

=== Winter transfers ===
Players In
Name	Nat	Pos	Age	Moving from
Moisés Corozo	ECU	DF	27	Macará (Ecuador)
Pedro Perlaza	ECU	DF	28	Delfín (Ecuador)
Billy Arce	ECU	MF	21	Barcelona SC (Ecuador)
Luis Arce	ECU	MF	26	El Nacional (Ecuador)
Davinson Jama	ECU	MF	21	Fuerza Amarilla (Ecuador)
Junior Sornoza	ECU	MF	25	Corinthians (Brazil) (loan)
Lucas Villarruel	ARG	MF	29	Newell's Old Boys (Argentina)
Matías Zunino	URU	MF	25	Nacional (Uruguay)
Marcos Caicedo	ECU	FW	28	Barcelona SC (Ecuador)
Ronny Medina	ECU	FW	24	América de Quito (Ecuador)

Players Out
Name	Nat	Pos	Age	Moving to
Kevin Minda	ECU	DF	21	Universidad Católica (Ecuador) (loan)
Édison Realpe	ECU	DF	23	Deceased
Julio Angulo	ECU	MF	29	Mushuc Runa (Ecuador)
José Luis Cazares	ECU	MF	28	Aucas (Ecuador)
Andrés Chicaiza	ECU	MF	27	Universidad Católica (Ecuador) (loan)
Anderson Julio	ECU	MF	23	Atlético San Luis (Mexico)
Jacob Murillo	ECU	MF	26	Independiente del Valle (Ecuador)
Jefferson Orejuela	ECU	MF	26	Querétaro (Mexico)
Thiago Serpa	ECU	MF	20	Deportivo Cuenca (Ecuador) (loan)
José Ayoví	ECU	FW	28	Guayaquil City (Ecuador)
Djorkaeff Reasco	ECU	FW	20	Dorados de Sinaloa (Mexico) (loan)

=== Summer transfers ===
Players In
Name	Nat	Pos	Age	Moving from
Ezequiel Piovi	ARG	MF	28	Arsenal de Sarandí (Argentina)

Players Out
Name	Nat	Pos	Age	Moving to
Carlos Rodríguez	URU	DF	30	Delfín (Ecuador) (loan)
Luis Arce	ECU	MF	26	Deportivo Cuenca (Ecuador)
Antonio Valencia	ECU	MF	34	Querétaro F.C. (Mexico)

== Competitions ==
Competition	Started round	Final position / round	First match	Last match
LigaPro	First Stage	Runner-up	February 14	December 29
CONMEBOL Libertadores	Group Stage	Round of 16	March 4	December 1
Supercopa Ecuador	Final	Champions	February 1	February 1

=== Pre-season friendlies ===
January 25 Noche Blanca	L.D.U. Quito	2–0	Fénix	Quito
20:30 UTC−05:00	Martínez 12'; J. Arce 76'	Report		Stadium: Estadio Rodrigo Paz Delgado; Attendance: 27,053; Referee: Carlos Orbe

=== LigaPro ===
The 2020 season was Liga's 59th season in the Serie A and their 19th consecutive.

==== First stage ====
Results summary

Overall								Home						Away					
Pld	W	D	L	GF	GA	GD	Pts	W	D	L	GF	GA	GD	W	D	L	GF	GA	GD
15	11	2	2	29	13	+16	35	6	0	1	12	5	+7	5	2	1	17	8	+9

Results by round

Round	1	2	3	4	5	6	7	8	9	10	11	12	13	14	15
Ground	A	H	A	H	A	H	A	H	A	H	A	H	A	A	H
Result	W	L	W	W	W	W	L	W	W	W	D	W	D	W	W
Position	2	9	4	1	1	1	1	1	1	1	1	1	1	1	1

Updated to match(es) played on October 3, 2020. Source: Competitive matches
A = Away; H = Home; W = Win; D = Draw; L = Loss

February 14 Round 1	Deportivo Cuenca	1–2	L.D.U. Quito	Cuenca
20:00 UTC−05:00	Viotti 20'; Arce (yellow card) 50'; Neculmán (yellow card) 53'; Cucco (yellow card) 69'; Segura (yellow card) 82'; Larrea (yellow card) 90+4'		Martínez 16', 80' (pen.); Vega (yellow card) 30'; Muñoz (yellow card) 41'; Perlaza (yellow card) 83'; Ayala (yellow card) 86'	Stadium: Estadio Alejandro Serrano Aguilar; Referee: Augusto Aragón

February 22 Round 2	L.D.U. Quito	2–3	Independiente del Valle	Quito
17:45 UTC−05:00	Valencia (yellow card) 45'; Martínez 73', 74'; Zunino (yellow card) 89'		Loor (yellow card) 46'; Mera 49', 90+5' (pen.); Chávez (yellow card) 55'; Piedra (yellow card) 57'; Murillo (yellow card) 67'; Caicedo 79'	Stadium: Estadio Rodrigo Paz Delgado; Attendance: 11,107; Referee: Guillermo Guerero

February 28 Round 3	El Nacional	0–3	L.D.U. Quito	Quito
19:00 UTC−05:00	Paredes (yellow card) 36'; Quiñónez (yellow card) 43' (yellow-red card) 69'; De Jesús (yellow card) 46'; Lara (yellow card) 65'; Mejía (yellow card) 71'		Martínez 10', 86'; Quintero 22'; Caicedo (yellow card) 29'; Valencia (yellow card) 33'; Rodríguez (yellow card) 35'; Villarruel (yellow card) 69'	Stadium: Estadio Olímpico Atahualpa; Referee: Roberto Sánchez

March 7 Round 4	L.D.U. Quito	2–1	Barcelona SC	Quito
18:00 UTC−05:00	Martínez 28' (pen.); Guerra (yellow card) 47', (goal) 90+1'; Villarruel (yellow card) 82'		Martínez 61'; Díaz (yellow card) 90'	Stadium: Estadio Rodrigo Paz Delgado; Attendance: 20,737; Referee: Franklin Congo

August 16 Round 5	Olmedo	2–3	L.D.U. Quito	Riobamba
16:00 UTC−05:00	Chalá (yellow card) 22'; Bolaños 42' (pen.); Delgado 48'; Pluas (yellow card) 54'; Bagüí (yellow card) 73'		Martínez 1'; Aguirre 82'; Muñoz 86'; Perlaza (yellow card) 90'	Stadium: Estadio Olímpico de Riobamba; Referee: Gabriel González

August 19 Round 6	L.D.U. Quito	2–1	Universidad Católica	Quito
17:00 UTC−05:00	Aguirre 17'; Sornoza (yellow card) 22'; Alcívar 26'; Guerra (yellow card) 54'		Tévez 28'; Minda (yellow card) 34' de los Santos (yellow card) 78'; Chicaiza (yellow card) 80'	Stadium: Estadio Rodrigo Paz Delgado; Referee: Álex Cajas

August 22 Round 7	Aucas	2–0	L.D.U. Quito	Quito
18:30 UTC−05:00	López 3', (yellow card) 15'; Mina 25'; Manchot (yellow card) 82'; Espinoza (yellow card) 90+2'; Figueroa (yellow card) 90+7'		Guerra (yellow card) 13'; Julio (red card) 36'; Quintero (yellow card) 90+6'	Stadium: Estadio Gonzalo Pozo Ripalda; Referee: Carlos Orbe

August 25 Round 8	L.D.U. Quito	1–0	Delfín	Quito
19:00 UTC−05:00	Corozo 14'; Guerra (yellow card) 43'; Piovi (yellow card) 45+1'			Stadium: Estadio Rodrigo Paz Delgado; Referee: Juan Andrade

August 29 Round 9	Orense	1–2	L.D.U. Quito	Machala
15:15 UTC−05:00	Nazareno (yellow card) 28'; Angulo (yellow card) 46'; Alman 59'; García (yellow card) 69'; Caicedo (yellow card) 84'; Silva (yellow card) 86'	Report	Muñoz 10', (yellow card) 15'; Aguirre (yellow card) 29'; Corozo 33'; Alcívar (yellow card) 41'	Stadium: Estadio 9 de Mayo; Referee: Jaime Sánchez

September 1 Round 10	L.D.U. Quito	1–0	Macará	Quito
16:45 UTC−05:00	Aguirre 43' (pen.); Guerra (yellow card) 55'; Perlaza (yellow card) 82'; Piovi (yellow card) 85'; Arce (red card) 89'	Report	Herrera (yellow card) 1'; Mora (yellow card) 45+4'	Stadium: Estadio Rodrigo Paz Delgado; Referee: Marlon Vera

September 5 Round 11	L.D.U. Portoviejo	1–1	L.D.U. Quito	Portoviejo
16:30 UTC−05:00	Hurtado (yellow card) 3'; Almada 19'; Monteverde (yellow card) 56'; Gómez (yellow card) 80'		Piovi (yellow card) 17'; Villarruel (yellow card) 24'; Martínez 45+7'	Stadium: Estadio Reales Tamarindos; Referee: Roberto Sánchez

September 11 Round 12	L.D.U. Quito	2–0	Guayaquil City	Quito
19:00 UTC−05:00	Zunino 21'; Cruz (yellow card) 45+2'; Martínez 51'; Guerra (yellow card) 60'		Ayoví (yellow card) 83'; Parrales (yellow card) 84'; Jiménez (yellow card) 85'	Stadium: Estadio Rodrigo Paz Delgado; Referee: Diego Lara

September 19 Round 13	Emelec	1–1	L.D.U. Quito	Guayaquil
18:00 UTC−05:00	Cevallos (yellow card) 17'; Leguizamón (yellow card) 48'; Ordóñez 58', (yellow card) 74' (yellow-red card) 84'		Sornoza 40'; Zunino (yellow card) 43'	Stadium: Estadio George Capwell; Referee: Jaime Sánchez

September 26 Round 14	Técnico Universitario	0–5	L.D.U. Quito	Ambato
19:30 UTC−05:00	Patta (yellow card) 14' (yellow-red card) 33'; Mosquera (yellow card) 60'; Santacruz (yellow card) 76'		Muñoz 6'; Piovi (yellow card) 38'; Arce 66'; Martínez 74', 89'; Sornoza 82'	Stadium: Estadio Bellavista; Referee: Marlon Vera

October 3 Round 15	L.D.U. Quito	2–0	Mushuc Runa	Quito
15:30 UTC−05:00	Villarruel (yellow card) 21', (goal) 36'; Perlaza (yellow card) 22'; Corozo 45+1'; Piovi (yellow card) 45+3'; Martínez (yellow card) 90+1'		Gómez (yellow card) 46'	Stadium: Estadio Rodrigo Paz Delgado; Referee: Álex Cajas

==== Second stage ====
Results summary

Overall								Home						Away					
Pld	W	D	L	GF	GA	GD	Pts	W	D	L	GF	GA	GD	W	D	L	GF	GA	GD
15	7	3	5	31	20	+11	24	5	1	2	20	6	+14	2	2	3	11	14	−3

Results by round

Round	1	2	3	4	5	6	7	8	9	10	11	12	13	14	15
Ground	H	A	H	A	H	A	H	H	A	H	A	H	A	A	H
Result	W	L	W	D	W	W	W	L	D	W	L	D	W	L	L
Position	1	5	4	4	2	1	1	2	3	3	4	4	3	3	4

Updated to match(es) played on December 20, 2020. Source: Competitive matches
A = Away; H = Home; W = Win; D = Draw; L = Loss

October 14 Round 1	L.D.U. Quito	5–0	Deportivo Cuenca	Quito
16:00 UTC−05:00	Muñoz 6', 32'; Guerra (yellow card) 15'; Martínez 20'; Quintero 28'; Sornoza 61'		Chávez (yellow card) 57'	Stadium: Estadio Rodrigo Paz Delgado; Referee: Roberto Sánchez

October 17 Round 2	Independiente del Valle	3–2	L.D.U. Quito	Quito
17:00 UTC−05:00	Loor (yellow card) 27'; Caicedo 75'; Faravelli 85'; Murillo 90+1' (pen.)		Martínez 7', 65' (pen.), (yellow card) 31'; Guerra (yellow card) 22'; Piovi (red card) 35'; Arce (yellow card) 80'; Gabbarini (yellow card) 84'; Perlaza (yellow card) 84'	Stadium: Estadio Olímpico Atahualpa; Referee: Marlon Vera

October 24 Round 3	L.D.U. Quito	1–0	El Nacional	Quito
20:30 UTC−05:00	Villarruel 71'		Díaz (yellow card) 37'; Chalá (yellow card) 45+2'; Quiñónez (yellow card) 45+4' (yellow-red card) 90+4'	Stadium: Estadio Rodrigo Paz Delgado; Referee: Augusto Aragón

November 1 Round 4	Barcelona SC	2–2	L.D.U. Quito	Guayaquil
18:00 UTC−05:00	Piñatares (yellow card) 8'; Castillo (yellow card) 35'; Colmán 44'; Díaz 54'		Alcívar (yellow card) 27', (goal) 75'; Martínez 66'	Stadium: Estadio Monumental Banco Pichincha; Referee: René Marín

November 6 Round 5	L.D.U. Quito	4–0	Orense	Quito
16:30 UTC−05:00	Muñoz 15'; Martínez 57', 72'; Julio 77'		Hall (yellow card) 81'	Stadium: Estadio Rodrigo Paz Delgado; Referee: Roddy Zambrano

November 11 Round 6	Mushuc Runa	1–2	L.D.U. Quito	Ambato
14:30 UTC−05:00	Mosquera (yellow card) 43' (yellow-red card) 61'; Faría 70', (red card) 89'; Orzán (red card) 87'		Caicedo (yellow card) 27'; Zunino 52'; Aguirre (yellow card) 65'; Arce 85'	Stadium: Estadio Mushuc Runa; Referee: Guillermo Guerrero

November 14 Round 7	L.D.U. Quito	4–1	Aucas	Quito
20:30 UTC−05:00	Martínez 5', 53', 81'; Zunino 10'; Quintero (yellow card) 31'; Caicedo (yellow card) 33'; Cruz (yellow card) 59'; Ordóñez (yellow card) 61'		Quiñónez 17'; Barreiro (yellow card) 44'; Mina (red card) 56'	Stadium: Estadio Rodrigo Paz Delgado; Referee: Franklin Congo

November 18 Round 8	L.D.U. Quito	1–2	Emelec	Quito
19:00 UTC−05:00	Caicedo (yellow card) 20'; Martínez 45+2'; Sornoza (yellow card) 45+4'; Quintero (yellow card) 55' (yellow-red card) 64'		Carabalí (yellow card) 21' (yellow-red card) 27'; Arroyo (yellow card) 28'; Rodríguez 77'; Cevallos 90+5'	Stadium: Estadio Rodrigo Paz Delgado; Referee: Augusto Aragón

November 21 Round 9	Guayaquil City	1–1	L.D.U. Quito	Guayaquil
20:00 UTC−05:00	Hoyos 25'; Sambonino (yellow card) 68'		Julio 5'; Cruz (yellow card) 21'; Caicedo (yellow card) 44'; Ordóñez (yellow card) 57'	Stadium: Estadio Christian Benítez Betancourt; Referee: Carlos Orbe

November 27 Round 10	L.D.U. Quito	3–0	Olmedo	Quito
16:30 UTC−05:00	Martínez 6', 27'; Arce 23'		Vidal (yellow card) 24'; Bolaños (yellow card) 49'; Cevallos (yellow card) 61'; Sainz (yellow card) 79'	Stadium: Estadio Rodrigo Paz Delgado; Referee: Gabriel González

December 5 Round 11	Universidad Católica	2–0	L.D.U. Quito	Quito
20:00 UTC−05:00	Oña 9'; Insaurralde (yellow card) 27'; Nazareno Bazán 78'; Minda (yellow card) 82'; Armas (yellow card) 89'		Corozo (yellow card) 38'; Alcívar (yellow card) 88'	Stadium: Estadio Olímpico Atahualpa; Referee: René Marín

December 9 Round 12	L.D.U. Quito	1–1	L.D.U. Portoviejo	Quito
15:00 UTC−05:00	Arce (yellow card) 51'; Ushiña 53' (o.g.); Caicedo (yellow card) 60'; Quintero (yellow card) 72'; Martínez (yellow card) 87'; Zunino (red card) 90+4'		Méndez 11'; Ushiña (yellow card) 13'; Frydiszewski (yellow card) 74'; Cisneros (yellow card) 90+5'	Stadium: Estadio Rodrigo Paz Delgado; Referee: Henri Arizaga

December 13 Round 13	Macará	3–4	L.D.U. Quito	Ambato
14:00 UTC−05:00	Quiñónez (yellow card) 14', (goal) 43' (pen.); Viotti (yellow card) 15'; Santacruz 17'; Molina 54'		Aguirre 7' (pen.), 45+1', (yellow card) 61'; Ayala (yellow card) 41'; Corozo 45+2', (yellow card) 87'; Muñoz 70'; Nazareno (yellow card) 82'; Arce (yellow card) 83'	Stadium: Estadio Bellavista; Referee: Augusto Aragón

December 16 Round 14	Delfín	2–0	L.D.U. Quito	Manta
19:00 UTC−05:00	Noboa (yellow card) 67'; Garcés 69'; Rojas 82'		Perlaza (yellow card) 45+2'; Alcívar (yellow card) 90+2'	Stadium: Estadio Jocay; Referee: Gabriel González

December 20 Round 15	L.D.U. Quito	1–2	Técnico Universitario	Quito
19:00 UTC−05:00	Jama 8'		Quintero 10'; Pineda 33'	Stadium: Estadio Rodrigo Paz Delgado; Referee: René Marín

==== Finals ====
Results summary

Overall								Home						Away					
Pld	W	D	L	GF	GA	GD	Pts	W	D	L	GF	GA	GD	W	D	L	GF	GA	GD
2	0	2	0	1	1	0	2	0	1	0	0	0	0	0	1	0	1	1	0

Results by round

Round	1	2
Ground	A	H
Result	D	D
Position	2	2

Updated to match(es) played on December 29, 2020. Source: Competitive matches
A = Away; H = Home; W = Win; D = Draw; L = Loss

December 23 Finals	Barcelona SC	1–1	L.D.U. Quito	Guayaquil
20:15 UTC−05:00	Álvez 50'; Pineida (yellow card) 67'; Piñatares (yellow card) 72'; Oyola (yellow card) 89'		Julio 45+4'; Alcívar (yellow card) 52'; Sornoza (yellow card) 55'; Martínez (yellow card) 90+6'	Stadium: Estadio Monumental Banco Pichincha; Referee: Augusto Aragón

December 29 Finals	L.D.U. Quito	0–0 (1–3 p)	Barcelona SC	Quito
20:15 UTC−05:00	Guerra (yellow card) 43'; Julio (yellow card) 63'		Pineida (yellow card) 76'; Piñatares (yellow card) 80'; Velasco (yellow card) 85'; Castillo (yellow card) 90+2'	Stadium: Estadio Rodrigo Paz Delgado; Referee: Guillermo Guerrero
	Penalties
	Alcívar (penalty scored); Guerra (penalty missed); Piovi (penalty missed); Martínez (penalty missed)		(penalty scored) Álvez; (penalty scored) Oyola; (penalty scored) Díaz

=== CONMEBOL Libertadores ===
L.D.U. Quito qualified to the 2020 CONMEBOL Libertadores—their 18th participation in the continental tournament—as Runner-up of the 2019 Serie A. They entered the competition in the group stage.

==== CONMEBOL Libertadores squad ====
No.	Pos.	Nation	Player
1	GK	ECU	Leonel Nazareno
2	MF	ECU	Daykol Romero
3	MF	ECU	Edilson Cabeza
4	DF	ECU	Luis Caicedo
5	MF	ARG	Lucas Villarruel
6	DF	ECU	Luis Ayala
7	MF	ECU	Édison Vega
8	MF	ECU	Jordy Alcívar
9	FW	ECU	Ronny Medina
10	MF	ECU	Junior Sornoza
11	MF	ECU	Billy Arce
12	GK	ECU	Erik Viveros
13	DF	ECU	Pedro Perlaza
14	DF	ECU	José Quintero
15	DF	ECU	Franklin Guerra

No.	Pos.	Nation	Player
16	MF	ECU	Davinson Jama
17	FW	ECU	Marcos Caicedo
18	MF	ECU	Jefferson Arce
19	FW	COL	Cristian Martínez
20	DF	ECU	Christian Cruz
21	DF	ECU	Andersson Ordóñez
22	GK	ARG	Adrián Gabbarini (captain)
23	MF	URU	Matías Zunino
24	DF	ECU	Moisés Corozo
25	MF	ARG	Ezequiel Piovi
26	MF	ECU	Jhojan Julio
27	FW	URU	Rodrigo Aguirre
28	MF	ECU	Joseph Espinoza
29	MF	ECU	Adolfo Muñoz

1. Carlos Rodríguez left the club.
2. Antonio Valencia left the club.
3. Luis Arce left the club.

Overall								Home						Away					
Pld	W	D	L	GF	GA	GD	Pts	W	D	L	GF	GA	GD	W	D	L	GF	GA	GD
8	5	0	3	14	10	+4	15	3	0	1	12	4	+8	2	0	2	2	6	−4

==== Group stage ====
Pos	Team	Pld	W	D	L	GF	GA	GD	Pts	Qualification
1	(Argentina) River Plate	6	4	1	1	21	6	+15	13	Round of 16
2	(Ecuador) LDU Quito	6	4	0	2	12	8	+4	12	Round of 16
3	(Brazil) São Paulo	6	2	1	3	14	11	+3	7	Copa Sudamericana
4	(Peru) Binacional	6	1	0	5	3	25	−22	3	

Source: CONMEBOL
Rules for classification: 1) Points; 2) Goal difference; 3) Goals scored; 4) Away goals scored; 5) CONMEBOL ranking.

March 4 Group Stage	L.D.U. Quito (Ecuador)	3–0	(Argentina) River Plate	Quito, Ecuador
19:30 UTC−05:00	Guerra 15'; Sornoza (yellow card) 34', (goal) 76' (pen.); Martínez 36'; Ayala (yellow card) 78'	Report	Ponzio (yellow card) 40'; Zuculini (yellow card) 74'; Ferreira (yellow card) 84'; Pratto (yellow card) 89'	Stadium: Estadio Rodrigo Paz Delgado; Referee: Andrés Rojas (Colombia)

March 11 Group Stage	São Paulo (Brazil)	3–0	(Ecuador) L.D.U. Quito	São Paulo, Brazil
21:30 UTC−03:00	Reinaldo 14' (pen.), (yellow card) 26'; Dani Alves 16'; Juanfran (yellow card) 45+2'; Igor Gomes 61'; Pablo (yellow card) 90+3'	Report	Quintero (yellow card) 26'; Guerra (yellow card) 37'; Ayala (yellow card) 41'; Sornoza (red card) 67'; Valencia (yellow card) 77'	Stadium: Estádio do Morumbi; Attendance: 39,107; Referee: Esteban Ostojich (Uruguay)

September 15 Group Stage	Binacional (Peru)	0–1	(Ecuador) L.D.U. Quito	Lima, Peru
19:30 UTC−05:00	Romero (yellow card) 57'	Report	Aguirre (yellow card) 24'; Zunino 30', (yellow card) 83'; Cruz (yellow card) 72'; Villarruel (yellow card) 78'	Stadium: Estadio Nacional del Perú; Referee: Ivo Méndez (Bolivia)

September 22 Group Stage	L.D.U. Quito (Ecuador)	4–2	(Brazil) São Paulo	Quito, Ecuador
19:30 UTC−05:00	Martínez 21'; Zunino (yellow card) 33'; Julio 36', 45+1'; Piovi (yellow card) 37'; Arce 76'	Report	Brenner 60'; Tréllez 82'; Rodrigo Nestor (yellow card) 89'	Stadium: Estadio Rodrigo Paz Delgado; Referee: Wilmar Roldán (Colombia)

September 29 Group Stage	L.D.U. Quito (Ecuador)	4–0	(Peru) Binacional	Quito, Ecuador
19:30 UTC−05:00	Otoya 2' (o.g.); Mancilla 14' (o.g.); Muñoz 58', 82'; Guerra (yellow card) 60'	Report	Romero (yellow card) 27'; Angles (yellow card) 64'; Reyes (yellow card) 82'	Stadium: Estadio Rodrigo Paz Delgado; Referee: Jhon Ospina (Colombia)

October 20 Group Stage	River Plate (Argentina)	3–0	(Ecuador) L.D.U. Quito	Avellaneda, Argentina
21:30 UTC−03:00	Montiel (yellow card) 20'; Santos Borré 53'; Álvarez 60'; De La Cruz (yellow card) 84'; Carrascal 89'	Report	Gabbarini (yellow card) 11'; Villarruel (yellow card) 19'; Muñoz (yellow card) 23'	Stadium: Estadio Libertadores de América; Referee: Roberto Tobar (Chile)

==== Round of 16 ====
November 24 Round of 16	L.D.U. Quito (Ecuador)	1–2	(Brazil) Santos	Quito, Ecuador
17:15 UTC−05:00	Vega (yellow card) 32'; Julio 45+2'; Alcívar (yellow card) 62'; Aguirre (yellow card) 81'; Ordóñez (yellow card) 90+8'	Report	Soteldo 7', (yellow card) 84'; Luiz Felipe (yellow card) 40'; Wagner Leonardo (yellow card) 48'; Marinho 59' (pen.); Felipe Jonatan (yellow card) 80'	Stadium: Estadio Rodrigo Paz Delgado; Referee: Fernando Rapallini (Argentina)

December 1 Round of 16	Santos (Brazil)	0–1	(Ecuador) L.D.U. Quito	Santos, Brazil
19:15 UTC−03:00	Alison (yellow card) 45'; Soteldo (yellow card) 59'; Wagner Leonardo (yellow card) 90+1'; John (yellow card) 90+22'; Luiz Felipe (red card) 90+22'	Report	Ayala (yellow card) 46'; Zunino 66'; Caicedo (yellow card) 89'; Aguirre (red card) 90+12'; Villarruel (red card) 90+22'	Stadium: Estádio Urbano Caldeira; Referee: Néstor Pitana (Argentina)

=== Supercopa Ecuador ===
It was the first edition of the tournament. L.D.U. Quito entered the competition as champions of 2019 Copa Ecuador and became the first champion of the tournament.

February 1 Final	Delfín	1–1 (4–5 p)	L.D.U. Quito	Guayaquil
16:00 UTC−05:00	Cangá (yellow card) 27'; Garcés 45+3' (pen.), (yellow card) 64'; Calderón (yellow card) 54'		Martínez 18'; Perlaza (yellow card) 36'; Rodríguez (yellow card) 40'; Quintero (yellow card) 71'; Zunino (yellow card) 82'; Valencia (yellow card) 90+4'	Stadium: Estadio Christian Benítez Betancourt; Referee: Guillermo Guerrero
	Penalties
	Cangá (penalty scored); Calderón (penalty scored); Mera (penalty missed); Garcés (penalty scored); Ale (penalty scored)		(penalty scored) Rodríguez; (penalty scored) Guerra; (penalty scored) Ayala; (penalty scored) Martínez; (penalty scored) Sornoza

== Player statistics ==
Num	Pos	Player	App	Goal	Yellow card	Red card	App	Goal	Yellow card	Red card	App	Goal	Yellow card	Red card	App	Goal	Yellow card	Red card
Num	Pos	Player	LigaPro				CONMEBOL Libertadores				Supercopa Ecuador				Total			
1	GK	Leonel Nazareno	3	—	1	—	—	—	—	—	—	—	—	—	3	—	1	—
2	DF	Joel Ventura	1	—	—	—	—	—	—	—	—	—	—	—	1	—	—	—
3	DF	Edilson Cabeza	1	—	—	—	—	—	—	—	—	—	—	—	1	—	—	—
4	DF	Luis Caicedo	13	—	5	—	4	—	1	—	—	—	—	—	17	—	6	—
5	MF	Lucas Villarruel	23	2	4	—	7	—	2	1	—	—	—	—	30	2	6	1
6	DF	Luis Ayala	20	—	2	—	7	—	3	—	1	—	—	—	28	—	5	—
7	MF	Édison Vega	15	—	1	—	3	—	1	—	1	—	—	—	19	—	2	—
8	MF	Jordy Alcívar	27	2	5	—	4	—	1	—	—	—	—	—	31	2	6	—
9	FW	Ronny Medina	1	—	—	—	2	—	—	—	—	—	—	—	3	—	—	—
10	MF	Junior Sornoza	27	3	3	—	3	1	1	1	1	—	—	—	31	4	4	1
11	MF	Billy Arce	26	3	3	1	8	1	—	—	—	—	—	—	34	4	3	1
12	GK	Erik Viveros	—	—	—	—	—	—	—	—	—	—	—	—	—	—	—	—
13	DF	Pedro Perlaza	24	—	6	—	7	—	—	—	1	—	1	—	32	—	7	—
14	DF	José Quintero	27	2	3	1	7	—	1	—	1	—	1	—	35	2	5	1
15	DF	Franklin Guerra	22	1	9	—	5	1	2	—	1	—	—	—	28	2	11	—
16	MF	Davinson Jama	10	1	—	—	—	—	—	—	1	—	—	—	11	1	—	—
17	FW	Marcos Caicedo	25	—	1	—	7	—	—	—	—	—	—	—	32	—	1	—
18	MF	Ezequiel Piovi	16	—	5	1	4	—	1	—	—	—	—	—	20	—	6	1
19	FW	Cristian Martínez	31	24	4	—	8	2	—	—	1	1	—	—	40	27	4	—
20	DF	Christian Cruz	26	—	3	—	5	—	1	—	—	—	—	—	31	—	4	—
21	DF	Andersson Ordóñez	5	—	2	—	2	—	1	—	—	—	—	—	7	—	3	—
22	GK	Adrián Gabbarini	29	—	1	—	8	—	1	—	1	—	—	—	38	—	2	—
23	MF	Matías Zunino	18	3	2	1	6	2	2	—	1	—	1	—	25	5	5	1
24	DF	Moisés Corozo	22	4	2	—	4	—	—	—	—	—	—	—	26	4	2	—
25	MF	Stalin Valencia	1	—	—	—	—	—	—	—	—	—	—	—	1	—	—	—
26	MF	Jhojan Julio	21	3	1	1	6	3	—	—	—	—	—	—	27	6	1	1
27	FW	Rodrigo Aguirre	20	5	3	—	5	—	2	1	—	—	—	—	25	5	5	1
28	MF	Joseph Espinoza	2	—	—	—	—	—	—	—	—	—	—	—	2	—	—	—
29	MF	Adolfo Muñoz	17	7	2	—	4	2	1	—	1	—	—	—	22	9	3	—
30	MF	Jefferson Troya	1	—	—	—	—	—	—	—	—	—	—	—	1	—	—	—
31	MF	Jefferson Arce	1	—	—	—	—	—	—	—	—	—	—	—	1	—	—	—
32	GK	Julio Cárdenas	—	—	—	—	—	—	—	—	—	—	—	—	—	—	—	—
3	DF	Carlos Rodríguez	4	—	1	—	2	—	—	—	1	—	1	—	7	—	2	—
25	MF	Antonio Valencia	4	—	2	—	2	—	1	—	1	—	1	—	7	—	4	—
30	MF	Luis Arce	1	—	—	—	—	—	—	—	—	—	—	—	1	—	—	—
Totals			—	60	71	5	—	12	22	3	—	1	5	0	—	73	98	8

As of December 29, 2020

Note: Players in italics left the club mid-season.

== Team statistics ==
	Total	Home	Away	Neutral
Total Games played	41	20	20	1
Total Games won	23	14	9	
Total Games drawn	8	2	5	1
Total Games lost	10	4	6	
Games played (LigaPro)	32	16	16	
Games won (LigaPro)	18	11	7	
Games drawn (LigaPro)	7	2	4	
Games lost (LigaPro)	7	3	4	
Games played (CONMEBOL Libertadores)	8	4	4	
Games won (CONMEBOL Libertadores)	5	3	2	
Games drawn (CONMEBOL Libertadores)				
Games lost (CONMEBOL Libertadores)	3	1	2	
Games played (Supercopa Ecuador)	1			1
Games won (Supercopa Ecuador)				
Games drawn (Supercopa Ecuador)	1			1
Games lost (Supercopa Ecuador)				
Biggest win (LigaPro)	5-0 vs Técnico Universitario; 5-0 vs Deportivo Cuenca	5-0 vs Deportivo Cuenca	5-0 vs Técnico Universitario	
Biggest loss (LigaPro)	0-2 vs Aucas; 0-2 vs Universidad Católica; 0-2 vs Delfín	2-3 vs Independiente del Valle; 1-2 vs Emelec; 1-2 vs Técnico Universitario	0-2 vs Aucas; 0-2 vs Universidad Católica; 0-2 vs Delfín	
Biggest win (CONMEBOL Libertadores)	4-0 vs Binacional	4-0 vs Binacional	1-0 vs Binacional; 1-0 vs Santos	
Biggest loss (CONMEBOL Libertadores)	0-3 vs São Paulo; 0-3 vs River Plate	1-2 vs Santos	0-3 vs São Paulo; 0-3 vs River Plate	
Biggest win (Supercopa Ecuador)				
Biggest loss (Supercopa Ecuador)				
Clean sheets	15	11	4	
Goals scored	76	44	31	1
Goals conceded	45	15	29	1
Goal difference	+31	+29	+2	0
Average GF per game	1.85	2.2	1.55	1
Average GA per game	1.1	0.75	1.45	1
Yellow cards	98	35	58	5
Red cards	8	3	5	
Most appearances	(Colombia) Cristian Martínez (40)	(Argentina) Adrián Gabbarini (19) (Colombia) Cristian Martínez (19)	(Colombia) Cristian Martínez (20)	(Ecuador) Luis Ayala (1) (Argentina) Adrián Gabbarini (1) (Ecuador) Franklin Guerra (1) (Ecuador) Davinson Jama (1) (Colombia) Cristian Martínez (1) (Ecuador) Adolfo Muñoz (1) (Ecuador) Pedro Perlaza (1) (Ecuador) José Quintero (1) (Uruguay) Carlos Rodríguez (1) (Ecuador) Junior Sornoza (1) (Ecuador) Antonio Valencia (1) (Ecuador) Édison Vega (1) (Uruguay) Matías Zunino (1)
Most minutes played	(Argentina) Adrián Gabbarini (3420)	(Argentina) Adrián Gabbarini (1710)	(Argentina) Adrián Gabbarini (1620)	(Ecuador) Luis Ayala (90) (Argentina) Adrián Gabbarini (90) (Ecuador) Franklin Guerra (90) (Colombia) Cristian Martínez (90) (Ecuador) Pedro Perlaza (90) (Uruguay) Carlos Rodríguez (90) (Ecuador) Junior Sornoza (90) (Ecuador) Antonio Valencia (90) (Ecuador) Édison Vega (90)
Top scorer	(Colombia) Cristian Martínez (27)	(Colombia) Cristian Martínez (15)	(Colombia) Cristian Martínez (11)	(Colombia) Cristian Martínez (1)
Worst discipline	(Argentina) Ezequiel Piovi (1) (red card) (6) (yellow card) (Argentina) Lucas Villarruel (1) (red card) (6) (yellow card)	(Ecuador) José Quintero (1) (red card) (2) (yellow card) (Uruguay) Matías Zunino (1) (red card) (2) (yellow card)	(Argentina) Lucas Villarruel (1) (red card) (4) (yellow card)	(Ecuador) Pedro Perlaza (1) (yellow card) (Ecuador) José Quintero (1) (yellow card) (Uruguay) Carlos Rodríguez (1) (yellow card) (Ecuador) Antonio Valencia (1) (yellow card) (Uruguay) Matías Zunino (1) (yellow card)
Penalties for	6/6 (100%)	3/3 (100%)	3/3 (100%)	
Penalties against	7/8 (87.5%)	3/4 (75%)	3/3 (100%)	1/1 (100%)
League Points	61/96 (63.54%)	35/48 (72.92%)	26/48 (54.17%)	
Winning rate	56.1%	70%	45%	0%

As of December 29, 2020
Source: See Competitive matches (above)
