= 2020 in Ecuadorian football =

Football in Ecuador
- Season: 2020

Men's football
- Liga Pro: Barcelona
- Liga Pro Serie B: 9 de Octubre
- Segunda Categoría: Guayaquil Sport
- Copa Ecuador: cancelled

Women's football
- Superliga Femenina: El Nacional
- Serie A Femenina: Liga Juvenil

The 2020 season in Ecuadorian football included all the matches of the different national male and female teams, as well as the local club tournaments, and the participation of these in international competitions in which representatives of the country's teams had participated.

== National teams ==
=== Ecuador national football team ===
==== Kits ====
Home	Away

==== 2022 FIFA World Cup qualification ====
8 October 2022 FIFA World Cup qualification	Argentina	1–0	Ecuador	Buenos Aires, Argentina
21:30 UTC−3	Messi 13' (pen.)	Report		Stadium: Estadio Alberto J. Armando; Attendance: 0 Referee: Roberto Tobar (Chile)

13 October 2022 FIFA World Cup qualification	Ecuador	4–2	Uruguay	Quito, Ecuador
16:00 UTC−5	Caicedo 14'; Estrada 45+3', 52'; Plata 75'	Report	Suárez 83' (pen.), 90+5' (pen.)	Stadium: Estadio Rodrigo Paz Delgado; Attendance: 0 Referee: Wilmar Roldán (Colombia)

12 November 2022 FIFA World Cup qualification	Bolivia	2–3	Ecuador	La Paz, Bolivia
16:00 UTC−4	Arce 37'; Moreno 60'	Report	B. Caicedo 46'; Mena 55'; Gruezo 88' (pen.)	Stadium: Estadio Hernando Siles; Attendance: 0 Referee: Wilton Sampaio (Brazil)

17 November 2022 FIFA World Cup qualification	Ecuador	6–1	Colombia	Quito, Ecuador
16:00 UTC−5	Arboleda 7'; Mena 9'; Estrada 32'; Arreaga 39'; Plata 78'; Estupiñán 90+1'	Report	Rodríguez 45+1' (pen.)	Stadium: Estadio Rodrigo Paz Delgado; Attendance: 0 Referee: Jesús Valenzuela (Venezuela)

==== 2020 Copa América ====
Tournament postponed for a year due to the COVID-19 pandemic in South America.

=== Ecuador national under-23 football team ===
==== 2020 CONMEBOL Pre-Olympic Tournament ====
===== Group A =====
Pos	Team	Pld	W	D	L	GF	GA	GD	Pts	Qualification
1	Argentina	4	4	0	0	9	2	+7	12	Final stage
2	Colombia (H)	4	2	1	1	7	3	+4	7	Final stage
3	Chile	4	2	1	1	4	2	+2	7	
4	Venezuela	4	1	0	3	3	7	−4	3	
5	Ecuador	4	0	0	4	0	9	−9	0	

Source: CONMEBOL
Rules for classification: Group stage tiebreakers
(H) Hosts

18 January 2020	Ecuador	0–3	Chile	Pereira
18:00		Report	Porozo 59' (o.g.); Moya 76'; Morales 90+4'	Stadium: Estadio Hernán Ramírez Villegas; Referee: Ivo Méndez (Bolivia)

21 January 2020	Colombia	4–0	Ecuador	Armenia
20:30	Benedetti 15'; Carrascal 26'; Cetré 32'; Carbonero 87'	Report		Stadium: Estadio Centenario; Referee: Eber Aquino (Paraguay)

24 January 2020	Venezuela	1–0	Ecuador	Pereira
18:00	Soteldo 25'	Report		Stadium: Estadio Hernán Ramírez Villegas; Referee: Andrés Matonte (Uruguay)

27 January 2020	Argentina	1–0	Ecuador	Pereira
18:00	Mac Allister 12'	Report		Stadium: Estadio Hernán Ramírez Villegas; Referee: Rodolpho Toski (Brazil)

=== Ecuador women's national under-20 football team ===
==== 2020 South American Under-20 Women's Football Championship ====
===== Group A =====
Pos	Team	Pld	W	D	L	GF	GA	GD	Pts	Qualification
1	Venezuela	4	3	1	0	14	1	+13	10	Final stage
2	Colombia	4	2	1	1	13	2	+11	7	Final stage
3	Argentina (H)	4	1	3	0	2	1	+1	6	
4	Ecuador	4	1	0	3	2	12	−10	3	
5	Bolivia	4	0	1	3	1	16	−15	1	

Source: CONMEBOL
Rules for classification: Group stage tiebreakers
(H) Hosts

4 March 2020	Argentina	1–0	Ecuador	San Juan
21:15	Braun 59'	Report		Stadium: Estadio San Juan del Bicentenario; Referee: Zulma Quiñónez (Paraguay)

8 March 2020	Bolivia	0–2	Ecuador	San Juan
21:15		Report	Arreaga 80'; Jácome 85'	Stadium: Estadio San Juan del Bicentenario; Referee: Elizabeth Tintaya (Peru)

11 March 2020	Ecuador	0–4	Colombia	San Juan
19:00		Report	Robledo 10', 18', 77'; Guerra 15'	Stadium: Estadio San Juan del Bicentenario; Referee: Edina Alves Batista (Brazil)

13 March 2020	Venezuela	7–0	Ecuador	San Juan
19:00	Higuera 38', 50', 86'; Argüelles 45+2'; Olivieri 57', 89'; Moreno 59'	Report		Stadium: Estadio San Juan del Bicentenario; Referee: María Carvajal (Chile)

=== Ecuador women's national under-17 football team ===
==== 2020 South American Under-17 Women's Football Championship ====
Tournament postponed due to the COVID-19 pandemic in South America.

== CONMEBOL competitions ==
=== CONMEBOL Copa Libertadores ===
==== Qualifying stages ====
===== First qualifying stage =====
Team 1	Agg.	Team 2	1st leg	2nd leg
Progreso (Uruguay)	1–5	(Ecuador) Barcelona	0–2	1–3

===== Second qualifying stage =====
Team 1	Agg.	Team 2	1st leg	2nd leg
Macará (Ecuador)	0–2	(Colombia) Deportes Tolima	0–1	0–1
Barcelona (Ecuador)	5–2	(Peru) Sporting Cristal	4–0	1–2

===== Third qualifying stage =====
Team 1	Agg.	Team 2	1st leg	2nd leg
Barcelona (Ecuador)	5–0	(Paraguay) Cerro Porteño	1–0	4–0

==== Group stage ====
===== Group A =====
Pos	Team	Pld	W	D	L	GF	GA	GD	Pts	Qualification	FLA	IDV	JUN	BSC
1	(Brazil) Flamengo	6	5	0	1	14	8	+6	15	Round of 16	—	4–0	3–1	3–0
2	(Ecuador) Independiente del Valle	6	4	0	2	14	8	+6	12	Round of 16	5–0	—	3–0	2–0
3	(Colombia) Junior	6	2	0	4	8	12	−4	6	Copa Sudamericana	1–2	4–1	—	0–2
4	(Ecuador) Barcelona	6	1	0	5	4	12	−8	3		1–2	0–3	1–2	—

Source: CONMEBOL

===== Group D =====
Pos	Team	Pld	W	D	L	GF	GA	GD	Pts	Qualification	RIV	LDQ	SPA	BIN
1	(Argentina) River Plate	6	4	1	1	21	6	+15	13	Round of 16	—	3–0	2–1	8–0
2	(Ecuador) LDU Quito	6	4	0	2	12	8	+4	12	Round of 16	3–0	—	4–2	4–0
3	(Brazil) São Paulo	6	2	1	3	14	11	+3	7	Copa Sudamericana	2–2	3–0	—	5–1
4	(Peru) Binacional	6	1	0	5	3	25	−22	3		0–6	0–1	2–1	—

Source: CONMEBOL

===== Group G =====
Pos	Team	Pld	W	D	L	GF	GA	GD	Pts	Qualification	SAN	DEL	DYJ	OLI
1	(Brazil) Santos	6	5	1	0	10	5	+5	16	Round of 16	—	1–0	2–1	0–0
2	(Ecuador) Delfín	6	2	1	3	6	7	−1	7	Round of 16	1–2	—	3–0	1–1
3	(Argentina) Defensa y Justicia	6	2	0	4	8	10	−2	6	Copa Sudamericana	1–2	3–0	—	2–1
4	(Paraguay) Olimpia	6	1	2	3	6	8	−2	5		2–3	0–1	2–1	—

Source: CONMEBOL

==== Knockout phase ====
===== Round of 16 =====
Team 1	Agg.	Team 2	1st leg	2nd leg
Independiente del Valle (Ecuador)	0–0 (2–4 p)	(Uruguay) Nacional	0–0	0–0
Delfín (Ecuador)	1–8	(Brazil) Palmeiras	1–3	0–5
LDU Quito (Ecuador)	2–2 (a)	(Brazil) Santos	1–2	1–0

=== CONMEBOL Copa Sudamericana ===
==== First stage ====
Team 1	Agg.	Team 2	1st leg	2nd leg
Blooming (Bolivia)	0–5	(Ecuador) Emelec	0–3	0–2
Fénix (Uruguay)	3–2	(Ecuador) El Nacional	1–0	2–2
Vélez Sarsfield (Argentina)	2–2 (a)	(Ecuador) Aucas	1–0	1–2
Lanús (Argentina)	3–2	(Ecuador) Universidad Católica	3–0	0–2

==== Second stage ====
Team 1	Agg.	Team 2	1st leg	2nd leg
Unión (Argentina)	2–2 (a)	(Ecuador) Emelec	0–1	2–1

=== CONMEBOL Copa Libertadores Femenina ===
==== Group stage ====
===== Group A =====
Pos	Team	Pld	W	D	L	GF	GA	GD	Pts	Qualification
1	(Brazil) Corinthians	3	3	0	0	27	0	+27	9	Quarter-finals
2	(Colombia) América	3	2	0	1	10	4	+6	6	Quarter-finals
3	(Peru) Universitario	3	0	1	2	1	14	−13	1	
4	(Ecuador) El Nacional	3	0	1	2	2	22	−20	1	

Source: CONMEBOL

== Men's football ==
League	Promoted to league	Relegated from league
Serie A	Orense S.C.; L.D.U. Portoviejo	América de Quito; Fuerza Amarilla S.C.
Serie B	Chacaritas F.C.; 9 de Octubre F.C.	L.D.U. Loja; C.D. Clan Juvenil
Segunda Categoría	—N/a	—N/a

=== Serie A ===
==== First stage ====
Pos	Team	Pld	W	D	L	GF	GA	GD	Pts	Qualification
1	LDU Quito	15	11	2	2	29	13	+16	35	Advance to Finals and qualification for Copa Libertadores group stage
2	Independiente del Valle	15	9	5	1	36	22	+14	32	
3	Universidad Católica	15	9	4	2	32	14	+18	31	
4	Barcelona	15	8	5	2	23	13	+10	29	
5	Macará	15	6	6	3	22	17	+5	24	
6	Aucas	15	7	2	6	26	23	+3	23	
7	Técnico Universitario	15	6	4	5	17	16	+1	22	
8	Delfín	15	5	3	7	17	22	−5	18	
9	Guayaquil City	15	5	3	7	17	23	−6	18	
10	Mushuc Runa	15	5	3	7	16	22	−6	18	
11	Olmedo	15	5	2	8	26	29	−3	17	
12	Emelec	15	4	4	7	20	22	−2	16	
13	El Nacional	15	3	5	7	16	24	−8	14	
14	LDU Portoviejo	15	3	4	8	19	30	−11	13	
15	Orense	15	1	7	7	15	27	−12	10	
16	Deportivo Cuenca	15	1	5	9	16	30	−14	8	

Source: LigaPro, Soccerway
Rules for classification: 1) Points, 2) Goal difference, 3) Goals for, 4) Away goals for, 5) Head-to-head record, 6) Drawing of lots.

==== Second stage ====
Pos	Team	Pld	W	D	L	GF	GA	GD	Pts	Qualification
1	Barcelona	15	8	5	2	22	7	+15	29	Advance to Finals and qualification for Copa Libertadores group stage
2	Emelec	15	8	4	3	28	15	+13	28	
3	Guayaquil City	15	7	5	3	23	17	+6	26	
4	LDU Quito	15	7	3	5	31	20	+11	24	
5	Deportivo Cuenca	15	6	5	4	18	21	−3	23	
6	Independiente del Valle	15	7	1	7	26	21	+5	22	
7	Orense	15	5	6	4	12	19	−7	21	
8	Delfín	15	5	5	5	22	19	+3	20	
9	Universidad Católica	15	5	5	5	16	14	+2	20	
10	Técnico Universitario	15	5	5	5	11	11	0	20	
11	Macará	15	6	2	7	15	20	−5	20	
12	Aucas	15	4	7	4	33	32	+1	19	
13	LDU Portoviejo	15	5	2	8	20	29	−9	17	
14	Mushuc Runa	15	3	4	8	17	23	−6	13	
15	Olmedo	15	3	4	8	16	27	−11	13	
16	El Nacional	15	3	3	9	10	25	−15	12	

Source: LigaPro, Soccerway
Rules for classification: 1) Points, 2) Goal difference, 3) Goals for, 4) Away goals for, 5) Head-to-head record, 6) Drawing of lots.

==== Aggregate table ====
Pos	Team	Pld	W	D	L	GF	GA	GD	Pts	Qualification or relegation
1	LDU Quito	30	18	5	7	60	33	+27	59	Qualification for Copa Libertadores group stage
2	Barcelona (C)	30	16	10	4	46	21	+25	58	Qualification for Copa Libertadores group stage
3	Independiente del Valle	30	16	6	8	62	43	+19	54	Qualification for Copa Libertadores second stage
4	Universidad Católica	30	14	9	7	48	28	+20	51	Qualification for Copa Libertadores first stage
5	Emelec	30	12	8	10	48	37	+11	44	Qualification for Copa Sudamericana first stage (Note: Since the 2020 Copa Ecuador was cancelled due to the COVID-19 pandemic in Ecuador, the spot awarded to its champions (Copa Sudamericana first stage) was passed over to the aggregate table fourth best-placed team not qualified for the Copa Libertadores.)
6	Guayaquil City	30	12	8	10	40	40	0	44	Qualification for Copa Sudamericana first stage
7	Macará	30	12	8	10	37	37	0	44	Qualification for Copa Sudamericana first stage
8	Aucas	30	11	9	10	59	55	+4	42	Qualification for Copa Sudamericana first stage
9	Técnico Universitario	30	11	9	10	28	27	+1	42	
10	Delfín	30	10	8	12	39	41	−2	38	
11	Mushuc Runa	30	8	7	15	33	45	−12	31	
12	Deportivo Cuenca	30	7	10	13	34	51	−17	31	
13	Orense	30	6	13	11	28	47	−19	31	
14	Olmedo	30	8	6	16	42	56	−14	30	
15	LDU Portoviejo (R)	30	8	6	16	39	59	−20	30	Relegation to Serie B
16	El Nacional (R)	30	6	8	16	26	49	−23	26	Relegation to Serie B

Source: LigaPro
Rules for classification: 1) Points, 2) Goal difference, 3) Goals for, 4) Away goals for, 5) Head-to-head record, 6) Drawing of lots.
(C) Champions; (R) Relegated

==== Finals ====
23 December 2020
20:15 UTC−5

Barcelona	1–1	LDU Quito
Álvez 50'	Report	Julio 45+4'

Estadio Monumental Isidro Romero Carbo, Guayaquil
Attendance: 0
Referee: Augusto Aragón

29 December 2020
20:15 UTC−5

LDU Quito	0–0	Barcelona
	Report
Penalties
Alcívar (penalty scored); Guerra (penalty missed); Piovi (penalty missed); Martínez Borja (penalty missed)	1–3	(penalty scored) Álvez; (penalty scored) Oyola; (penalty scored) Díaz

Estadio Rodrigo Paz Delgado, Quito
Attendance: 0
Referee: Guillermo Guerrero

=== Serie B ===
Pos	Team	Pld	W	D	L	GF	GA	GD	Pts	
1	9 de Octubre (C, P)	18	9	6	3	27	16	+11	33	Champions, promoted to the 2021 Serie A
2	Manta (P)	18	9	5	4	26	18	+8	32	Promoted to the 2021 Serie A
3	América de Quito	18	8	4	6	20	14	+6	28	
4	Atlético Porteño	18	7	5	6	15	15	0	26	
5	Chacaritas	18	5	8	5	23	26	−3	23	
6	Gualaceo	18	6	4	8	21	21	0	22	
7	Independiente Juniors	18	4	8	6	19	24	−5	20	
8	Atlético Santo Domingo	18	4	8	6	12	19	−7	20	
9	Fuerza Amarilla (R)	18	3	9	6	14	19	−5	18	Relegated to the 2021 Segunda Categoría
10	Santa Rita (R)	18	3	7	8	19	24	−5	16	Relegated to the 2021 Segunda Categoría

Source: LigaPro
(C) Champions; (P) Promoted; (R) Relegated

=== Segunda Categoría ===
1st Round
Cumbayá	1	4	5
Ciudad de Pedernales	1	0	1
Imbabura	0	3	3
Venecia	1	1	2
Libertad	0	1	1
Vargas Torres (a)	0	1	1
Everest	0	1	1
La Unión	2	0	2
Alianza	1	1	2
Bonita Banana	0	0	0
Águilas	2	5	7
LDJ (Macas)	1	1	2
Universitario	0	4	4
Cañar	0	0	0
Unibolívar	0	2	2
Baldor Bermeo Cabrera	2	1	3
La Paz	2	3	5
Leones del Norte	0	1	1
Atlético Saquisilí	2	3	5
Santa Elena	1	0	1
Azogues	2	0	2
3 de Julio	3	1	4
Guayaquil Sport	1	3	4
Gloria	1	0	1
Atacames	0	2	2
Dunamis	0	0	0
Caribe Junior	1	1	2
Deportivo Coca	3	0	3
Primero de Mayo	1	0	1
Pastaza	1	1	2
Aampetra	1	2	3
Insutec	1	1	2

2nd Round
Cumbayá (p)	1	0	1 (13)
Imbabura	0	1	1 (12)
Vargas Torres	1	0	1
La Unión	2	0	2
Alianza	1	3	4
Águilas	2	0	2
Universitario	0	2	2
Baldor Bermeo Cabrera	1	0	1
La Paz	1	1	2
Atlético Saquisilí	1	0	1
3 de Julio	0	2	2
Guayaquil Sport	2	2	4
Atacames	1	3	4
Deportivo Coca	0	0	0
Pastaza	0	0	0
Aampetra	1	1	2

Quarterfinals
Cumbayá	2	1	3
La Unión	1	1	2
Alianza	2	1	3
Universitario	1	1	2
La Paz	0	1	1
Guayaquil Sport	2	0	2
Atacames	0	0	0 (2)
Aampetra (p)	0	0	0 (3)

Semifinals
Cumbayá (a)	1	0	1
Alianza	1	0	1
Guayaquil Sport	0	2	2
Aampetra	1	0	1

Finals
Cumbayá	0
Guayaquil Sport	1

=== Copa Ecuador ===
- Tournament was cancelled due to the COVID-19 pandemic.

=== Supercopa de Ecuador ===
1 February 2020
16:00 UTC−5

Delfín	1–1	LDU Quito
Garcés 45+2' (pen.)	Report	Martínez Borja 18'
Penalties
Cangá (penalty scored); Calderón (penalty scored); Mera (penalty missed); Garcés (penalty scored); Ale (penalty scored)	4–5	(penalty scored) Rodríguez; (penalty scored) Guerra; (penalty scored) Ayala; (penalty scored) Martínez Borja; (penalty scored) Sornoza

Estadio Christian Benítez Betancourt, Guayaquil
Referee: Guillermo Guerrero

== Women's football ==
=== Superliga Femenina ===
Finals

16 December 2020
16:00

Ñañas	0–2	El Nacional
	Report	Charcopa 57'; Bolaños 77'

Estadio Olímpico Atahualpa, Quito

21 December 2020
19:00

El Nacional	2–1	Ñañas
Bolaños 9'; Gracia 86'	Report	Pérez 71'

Estadio Olímpico Atahualpa, Quito

El Nacional won 4–1 on aggregate.
