= 2020 Supercopa Ecuador =

Delfín	LDU Quito
1	1
- LDU Quito won 5–4 on penalties
- Date: 1 February 2020
- Venue: Estadio Christian Benítez Betancourt, Guayaquil
- Referee: Guillermo Guerrero

The 2020 Supercopa Ecuador was the first edition of the Supercopa Ecuador, Ecuador's football super cup. It was held on 1 February 2020 between 2019 Ecuadorian Serie A champions Delfín and 2019 Copa Ecuador champions LDU Quito, being the third final in a row played between both sides after the final series of both the league and the cup. It was also the first time VAR was implemented in Ecuadorian football.

The match was played at Estadio Christian Benítez Betancourt in Guayaquil. Originally it was scheduled to be played at Estadio Monumental Isidro Romero Carbo, however, the venue was switched due to the latter stadium hosting the return leg of Barcelona's Copa Libertadores first stage tie against Uruguayan club Progreso on 29 January.

LDU Quito were the winners, beating Delfín 5–4 on penalties following a 1–1 draw after 90 minutes.

== Teams ==
Team	Qualification
Delfín	2019 Ecuadorian Serie A champions
LDU Quito	2019 Copa Ecuador champions

== Match ==
1 February 2020
16:00 UTC−5

Delfín	1–1	LDU Quito
Garcés 45+2' (pen.)	Report	Martínez Borja 18'
Penalties
Cangá (penalty scored); Calderón (penalty scored); Mera (penalty missed); Garcés (penalty scored); Ale (penalty scored)	4–5	(penalty scored) Rodríguez; (penalty scored) Guerra; (penalty scored) Ayala; (penalty scored) Martínez Borja; (penalty scored) Sornoza

Estadio Christian Benítez Betancourt, Guayaquil
Referee: Guillermo Guerrero

Delfín	LDU Quito

GK	1	(Venezuela) Alain Baroja
DF	24	(Ecuador) Geovanny Nazareno
DF	33	(Ecuador) Luis Cangá	(yellow card) 27'
DF	26	(Uruguay) Agustín Ale
DF	10	(Ecuador) Francisco Mera
MF	18	(Ecuador) David Noboa
MF	3	(Equatorial Guinea) Niko Kata	(substituted off) 46'
MF	15	(Uruguay) Martín Alaniz	(substituted off) 80'
FW	7	(Ecuador) Juan Diego Rojas
FW	14	(Ecuador) Segundo Portocarrero	(substituted off) 46'
FW	11	(Ecuador) Carlos Garcés	(yellow card) 64'
Substitutes:
MF	32	(Argentina) Óscar Benítez	(substituted on) 46'
MF	8	(Ecuador) Richard Calderón	(substituted on) 46'	(yellow card) 55'
DF	13	(Ecuador) Janner Corozo	(substituted on) 80'
Manager:
(Spain) Ángel López Pérez

GK	22	(Argentina) Adrián Gabbarini
DF	13	(Ecuador) Pedro Pablo Perlaza
DF	15	(Ecuador) Franklin Guerra
DF	3	(Uruguay) Carlos Rodríguez	(yellow card) 36'
DF	6	(Ecuador) Luis Ayala
MF	25	(Ecuador) Antonio Valencia	(yellow card) 90+4'
MF	7	(Ecuador) Édison Vega
MF	14	(Ecuador) José Quintero	(yellow card) 71'	(substituted off) 75'
MF	10	(Ecuador) Junior Sornoza
MF	29	(Ecuador) Adolfo Muñoz	(substituted off) 85'
CF	7	(Colombia) Cristian Martínez Borja
Substitutes:
MF	23	(Uruguay) Matías Zunino	(substituted on) 75'	(yellow card) 82'
MF	16	(Ecuador) Davinson Jama	(substituted on) 85'
Manager:
(Uruguay) Pablo Repetto

Assistant referees:
Christian Lescano
Mónica Amboya
Fourth official:
Augusto Aragón
Video assistant referee:
Carlos Orbe
Assistant video assistant referee:
Luis Quiroz

Match rules

- 90 minutes.
- Penalty shoot-out if tied.
