= 2020 LigaPro Serie A =

LigaPro Serie A
- Season: 2020
- Dates: 14 February – 29 December 2020
- Champions: Barcelona (16th title)
- Relegated: LDU Portoviejo; El Nacional
- Copa Libertadores: Barcelona; LDU Quito; Independiente del Valle; Universidad Católica
- Copa Sudamericana: Emelec; Guayaquil City; Macará; Aucas
- Matches: 240
- Goals: 667 (2.78 per match)
- Top goalscorer: Cristian Martínez Borja (24 goals)
- Biggest home win: LDU Quito 5–0 Dep. Cuenca (14 October)
- Biggest away win: LDU Portoviejo 0–6 Emelec (11 November)
- Highest scoring: Ind. del Valle 4–4 Macará (18 August)

The 2020 Campeonato Ecuatoriano de Fútbol Serie A (until 18 September 2020 officially known as the LigaPro Banco Pichincha 2020 for sponsorship reasons) was the 62nd season of the Serie A, Ecuador's top tier football league, and the second under the management of the Liga Profesional de Fútbol del Ecuador (or LigaPro). Delfín were the defending champions. Barcelona won their 16th domestic league title after defeating LDU Quito 3–1 on penalties following a 1–1 draw on aggregate score in the finals.

The competition was suspended from 14 March to 14 August due to the COVID-19 pandemic.

== Format ==
The format for the 2020 season was decided by LigaPro's Council of Presidents on 22 October 2019. For this season, the league returned to the three-stage system used before the 2019 season, scrapping the play-off stage played in the previous season. The first and second stages were played as single round-robin tournaments with all teams playing each other once for a total of 15 matches per stage. The first stage fixture was reversed for the second stage, and the top teams at the end of each stage qualified for the finals as well as the Copa Libertadores group stage. The finals were a double-legged series between the winners of both stages with a penalty shoot-out deciding the champion in case of a tie in points and goals scored. In case a team won both stages of the season, the finals would not have been played and that team would win the championship.

An aggregate table including the matches of both the first and second stages was used to decide international qualification and relegation, with the best two teams (other than the stage winners) qualifying for the Copa Libertadores, and the next best three teams qualifying for the Copa Sudamericana. The remaining Copa Sudamericana berth would have been allocated through the 2020 Copa Ecuador, which was cancelled due to the COVID-19 pandemic and had its berth reallocated to the next best team in the aggregate table. Meanwhile, the teams that ended in the 15th and 16th place of the aggregate table would have competed in relegation play-offs against the third- and fourth-placed teams of the 2020 Serie B for the right to remain in the top tier for the following season, however, in a Council of Presidents session held on 23 May 2020 it was decided not to expand the Serie A to 18 teams for the 2021 season, meaning that the bottom two teams of the aggregate table at the end of the season were relegated to Serie B.

== Teams ==
=== Stadia and locations ===
Locations of the 2020 Serie A teams.

Team	City	Stadium	Capacity
Aucas	Quito	Gonzalo Pozo Ripalda	21,689
Barcelona	Guayaquil	Monumental Banco Pichincha	57,267
Delfín	Manta	Jocay	17,834
Deportivo Cuenca	Cuenca	Banco del Austro Alejandro Serrano Aguilar	18,549
El Nacional	Quito	Olímpico Atahualpa	35,258
El Nacional	Cayambe	Guillermo Albornoz	12,000
Emelec	Guayaquil	Banco del Pacífico Capwell	40,020
Guayaquil City	Guayaquil	Christian Benítez Betancourt	10,152
Independiente del Valle	Sangolquí	Rumiñahui	7,233
Independiente del Valle	Quito	Olímpico Atahualpa (Note: Used by Independiente del Valle for their home match against Mushuc Runa, and as home stadium since the resumption of the league following the COVID-19 pandemic.)	35,258
Independiente del Valle	Quito	Rodrigo Paz Delgado (Note: Used by Independiente del Valle for their home match against Orense.)	41,575
LDU Portoviejo	Portoviejo	Reales Tamarindos	20,500
LDU Quito	Quito	Rodrigo Paz Delgado	41,575
Macará	Ambato	Bellavista	16,467
Mushuc Runa	Ambato	COAC Mushuc Runa	6,000
Mushuc Runa	Ambato	Bellavista (Note: Used by Mushuc Runa for their home match against Barcelona.)	16,467
Olmedo	Riobamba	Olímpico	7,233
Orense	Machala	9 de Mayo	16,456
Técnico Universitario	Ambato	Bellavista	16,467
Universidad Católica	Quito	Olímpico Atahualpa	35,258

=== Personnel and kits ===
Team	Manager	Kit manufacturer	Shirt sponsor
Aucas	(Argentina) Darío Tempesta	Umbro	Banco del Pacífico
Barcelona	(Argentina) Fabián Bustos	Marathon	Pilsener
Delfín	(Argentina) Horacio Montemurro (caretaker)	Baldo's	Banco del Pacífico
Deportivo Cuenca	(Argentina) Guillermo Duró (caretaker)	Joma	Chubb Seguros
El Nacional	(Ecuador) José Villafuerte (caretaker)	Lotto	Aceros ANDEC; Banco General Rumiñahui
Emelec	(Spain) Ismael Rescalvo	Adidas	Tubos Pacífico
Guayaquil City	(Ecuador) Pool Gavilánez	Astro	Cooperativa San Francisco Ltda.
Independiente del Valle	(Spain) Miguel Ángel Ramírez	Marathon	Chery; DirecTV
LDU Portoviejo	(Argentina) Pablo Trobbiani	Boman	Cooperativa 15 de Abril
LDU Quito	(Uruguay) Pablo Repetto	Puma	Banco Pichincha
Macará	(Ecuador) Paúl Vélez	Boman	Cooperativa San Francisco Ltda.
Mushuc Runa	(Argentina) Ricardo Dillon	Elohim	Cooperativa Mushuc Runa
Olmedo	(Ecuador) Geovanny Cumbicus	Boman	Cooperativa Daquilema; GolTV
Orense	(Argentina) Patricio Lara	JMP Sport	Banco del Austro
Técnico Universitario	(Colombia) José Eugenio Hernández	Boman	Cooperativa San Francisco Ltda.
Universidad Católica	(Colombia) Santiago Escobar	Umbro	Discover Card

=== Managerial changes ===
Team	Outgoing manager	Manner of departure	Date of vacancy	Position in table	Incoming manager	Date of appointment
First stage
Olmedo	(Argentina) Ricardo Dillon	Resigned	3 November 2019	Pre-season	(Argentina) Darío Franco	9 December 2019
Mushuc Runa	(Argentina) Martín Cardetti	Sacked	5 November 2019	Pre-season	(Argentina) Ricardo Dillon	12 November 2019
El Nacional	(Argentina) Marcelo Zuleta	End of contract	7 November 2019	Pre-season	(Colombia) Eduardo Lara	12 November 2019
Barcelona	(Uruguay) Tabaré Silva	End of contract	27 November 2019	Pre-season	(Argentina) Fabián Bustos	16 December 2019
Aucas	(Argentina) Gabriel Schürrer	End of contract	9 December 2019	Pre-season	(Argentina) Máximo Villafañe	11 December 2019
Delfín	(Argentina) Fabián Bustos	Signed by Barcelona	15 December 2019	Pre-season	(Spain) Ángel López Pérez	27 December 2019
Delfín	(Spain) Ángel López Pérez	Sacked	29 February 2020	11th	(Argentina) Carlos Ischia	1 March 2020
Aucas	(Argentina) Máximo Villafañe	Resigned	14 June 2020	16th	(Argentina) Darío Tempesta	14 June 2020
Olmedo	(Argentina) Darío Franco	Resigned	15 June 2020	13th	(Ecuador) Geovanny Cumbicus	18 June 2020
El Nacional	(Colombia) Eduardo Lara	Sacked	20 June 2020	9th	(Argentina) Jorge Montesino	20 June 2020
Orense	(Ecuador) Humberto Pizarro	Mutual consent	1 September 2020	15th	(Argentina) Patricio Lara	2 September 2020
Delfín	(Argentina) Carlos Ischia	Sacked	4 September 2020	11th	(Argentina) Miguel Ángel Zahzú	4 September 2020
Deportivo Cuenca	(Uruguay) Tabaré Silva	Sacked	30 September 2020	16th	(Argentina) Guillermo Duró (caretaker)	30 September 2020
Second stage
LDU Portoviejo	(Argentina) Rubén Darío Insúa	Sacked	5 November 2020	15th	(Argentina) Marcelo Zuleta	5 November 2020
El Nacional	(Argentina) Jorge Montesino	Sacked	7 November 2020	15th	(Ecuador) Javier Rodríguez	7 November 2020
El Nacional	(Ecuador) Javier Rodríguez	Resigned	20 November 2020	16th	(Ecuador) Édison Méndez	20 November 2020
LDU Portoviejo	(Argentina) Marcelo Zuleta	Resigned	20 November 2020	15th	(Argentina) Pablo Trobbiani	20 November 2020
Delfín	(Argentina) Miguel Ángel Zahzú	Sacked	3 December 2020	10th	(Argentina) Horacio Montemurro (caretaker)	3 December 2020
El Nacional	(Ecuador) Édison Méndez	Resigned	8 December 2020	16th	(Ecuador) José Villafuerte (caretaker)	8 December 2020

== Effects of the COVID-19 pandemic ==
On 14 March 2020 after two Matchday 5 games had been played, the competition was suspended indefinitely by LigaPro due to the COVID-19 pandemic.

On 20 May LigaPro's Council of Presidents decided to tentatively resume the league on 17 July pending final approval by the Ecuadorian government, with matches to be played behind closed doors. That same day the Council approved to restart training activities on 8 June, which was later moved to 10 June per decision by the National Emergency Operations Committee (COE). However, the date for the resumption of the competition was pushed back as the protocol approved by the Ecuadorian government through the National COE had set 29 July as the earliest tentative date for resumption.

On 27 July, the National COE approved LigaPro's biosecurity protocol and established 15 August as the tentative date to resume the competition. Eventually, on 11 August the National COE approved LigaPro's request to resume the competition on 14 August, with the completion of the fifth matchday.

== First stage ==
=== Standings ===
Pos	Team	Pld	W	D	L	GF	GA	GD	Pts	Qualification
1	LDU Quito	15	11	2	2	29	13	+16	35	Advance to Finals and qualification for Copa Libertadores group stage
2	Independiente del Valle	15	9	5	1	36	22	+14	32	
3	Universidad Católica	15	9	4	2	32	14	+18	31	
4	Barcelona	15	8	5	2	23	13	+10	29	
5	Macará	15	6	6	3	22	17	+5	24	
6	Aucas	15	7	2	6	26	23	+3	23	
7	Técnico Universitario	15	6	4	5	17	16	+1	22	
8	Delfín	15	5	3	7	17	22	−5	18	
9	Guayaquil City	15	5	3	7	17	23	−6	18	
10	Mushuc Runa	15	5	3	7	16	22	−6	18	
11	Olmedo	15	5	2	8	26	29	−3	17	
12	Emelec	15	4	4	7	20	22	−2	16	
13	El Nacional	15	3	5	7	16	24	−8	14	
14	LDU Portoviejo	15	3	4	8	19	30	−11	13	
15	Orense	15	1	7	7	15	27	−12	10	
16	Deportivo Cuenca	15	1	5	9	16	30	−14	8	

Source: LigaPro, Soccerway
Rules for classification: 1) Points, 2) Goal difference, 3) Goals for, 4) Away goals for, 5) Head-to-head record, 6) Drawing of lots.

=== Results ===
Home \ Away	AUC	BAR	DEL	CUE	NAC	EME	GUA	IDV	LDP	LDQ	MAC	MUS	OLM	ORE	TEC	CAT
Aucas	—	—	1–2	2–0	2–0	—	3–1	—	4–1	2–0	1–0	3–0	—	—	—	—
Barcelona	4–2	—	—	—	0–0	2–1	—	—	1–1	—	—	—	3–1	1–0	0–0	1–0
Delfín	—	1–2	—	2–1	2–1	2–0	—	—	—	—	—	4–1	—	0–0	0–2	0–0
Deportivo Cuenca	—	0–3	—	—	—	—	1–1	1–3	—	1–2	—	—	0–3 (Note: Match awarded 3–0 to Olmedo due to Deportivo Cuenca being suspended by FEF for failing to pay its creditors.)	2–2	2–2	1–2
El Nacional	—	—	—	1–1	—	2–1	—	2–4	2–1	0–3	—	—	3–2	2–2	0–1	—
Emelec	4–0	—	—	2–0	—	—	1–2	2–2	2–1	1–1	—	2–0	—	—	—	—
Guayaquil City	—	2–1	0–0	—	2–1	—	—	—	—	—	1–1	—	4–1	—	1–0	1–3
Independiente del Valle	1–1	1–1	4–2	—	—	—	3–0	—	—	—	4–4	2–1	1–2	—	—	2–2
LDU Portoviejo	—	—	2–1	2–4	—	—	3–1	1–2	—	1–1	2–2	—	2–1	—	—	—
LDU Quito	—	2–1	1–0	—	—	—	2–0	2–3	—	—	1–0	2–0	—	—	—	2–1
Macará	—	1–1	5–1	2–1	1–0	1–0	—	—	—	—	—	—	—	—	0–0	1–1
Mushuc Runa	—	1–2	—	1–1	1–1	—	2–1	—	1–0	—	2–0	—	—	—	—	1–2
Olmedo	3–2	—	2–0	—	—	1–1	—	—	—	2–3	1–2	1–2	—	2–2	—	—
Orense	2–2	—	—	—	—	2–2	1–0	1–3	1–1	1–2	1–2	0–2	—	—	—	—
Técnico Universitario	2–0	—	—	—	—	2–0	—	0–1	3–1	0–5	—	1–1	1–3	2–0	—	—
Universidad Católica	3–1	—	—	—	1–1	4–1	—	—	4–0	—	—	—	3–1	4–0	2–1	—

Source: LigaPro, Soccerway
Legend: Blue = home team win; Yellow = draw; Red = away team win.

== Second stage ==
=== Standings ===
Pos	Team	Pld	W	D	L	GF	GA	GD	Pts	Qualification
1	Barcelona	15	8	5	2	22	7	+15	29	Advance to Finals and qualification for Copa Libertadores group stage
2	Emelec	15	8	4	3	28	15	+13	28	
3	Guayaquil City	15	7	5	3	23	17	+6	26	
4	LDU Quito	15	7	3	5	31	20	+11	24	
5	Deportivo Cuenca	15	6	5	4	18	21	−3	23	
6	Independiente del Valle	15	7	1	7	26	21	+5	22	
7	Orense	15	5	6	4	12	19	−7	21	
8	Delfín	15	5	5	5	22	19	+3	20	
9	Universidad Católica	15	5	5	5	16	14	+2	20	
10	Técnico Universitario	15	5	5	5	11	11	0	20	
11	Macará	15	6	2	7	15	20	−5	20	
12	Aucas	15	4	7	4	33	32	+1	19	
13	LDU Portoviejo	15	5	2	8	20	29	−9	17	
14	Mushuc Runa	15	3	4	8	17	23	−6	13	
15	Olmedo	15	3	4	8	16	27	−11	13	
16	El Nacional	15	3	3	9	10	25	−15	12	

Source: LigaPro, Soccerway
Rules for classification: 1) Points, 2) Goal difference, 3) Goals for, 4) Away goals for, 5) Head-to-head record, 6) Drawing of lots.

=== Results ===
Home \ Away	AUC	BAR	DEL	CUE	NAC	EME	GUA	IDV	LDP	LDQ	MAC	MUS	OLM	ORE	TEC	CAT
Aucas	—	2–1	—	—	—	1–1	—	3–3	—	—	—	—	3–3	4–1	2–1	1–1
Barcelona	—	—	1–0	2–0	—	—	2–0	2–0	—	2–2	3–0	3–0	—	—	—	—
Delfín	2–2	—	—	—	—	—	1–1	1–0	4–2	2–0	1–2	—	3–1	—	—	—
Deportivo Cuenca	3–3	—	2–1	—	0–0	2–1	—	—	2–1	—	2–1	1–0	—	—	—	—
El Nacional	2–2	1–1	1–3	—	—	—	0–3 (Note: Match awarded 3–0 to Guayaquil City due to El Nacional being suspended by FEF for failing to pay its creditors.)	—	—	—	2–1	2–1	—	—	—	0–2
Emelec	—	1–1	3–2	—	3–0	—	—	—	—	—	0–0	—	4–1	1–0	1–1	2–0
Guayaquil City	4–2	—	—	2–1	—	1–0	—	0–2	3–1	1–1	—	3–2	—	1–1	—	—
Independiente del Valle	—	—	—	2–1	2–0	3–0	—	—	2–3	3–2	—	—	—	4–0	1–0	—
LDU Portoviejo	3–2	0–2	—	—	3–0	0–6	—	—	—	—	—	0–0	—	1–2	0–2	2–1
LDU Quito	4–1	—	—	5–0	1–0	1–2	—	—	1–1	—	—	—	3–0	4–0	1–2	—
Macará	2–1	—	—	—	—	—	1–1	1–0	1–0	3–4	—	0–3	1–0	0–1	—	—
Mushuc Runa	1–4	—	2–0	—	—	2–3	—	3–2	—	1–2	—	—	1–1	0–0	0–1	—
Olmedo	—	1–0	—	1–1	1–2	—	1–2	2–1	1–3	—	—	—	—	—	0–0	2–1
Orense	—	0–0	1–1	1–1	1–0	—	—	—	—	—	—	—	2–1	—	1–0	1–1
Técnico Universitario	—	0–2	1–1	1–1	1–0	—	0–0	—	—	—	0–1	—	—	—	—	1–0
Universidad Católica	—	0–0	0–0	0–1	—	—	2–1	3–1	—	2–0	2–1	1–1	—	—	—	—

Source: LigaPro, Soccerway
Legend: Blue = home team win; Yellow = draw; Red = away team win.

== Finals ==
LDU Quito and Barcelona qualified for the Finals (Third stage) by being the First stage and Second stage winners, respectively. The winners were the Serie A champions and earned the Ecuador 1 berth in the 2021 Copa Libertadores, and the losers were the Serie A runners-up and earned the Ecuador 2 berth in the 2021 Copa Libertadores. By having the greater number of points in the aggregate table, LDU Quito played the second leg at home.

23 December 2020
20:15 UTC−5

Barcelona	1–1	LDU Quito
Álvez 50'	Report	Julio 45+4'

Estadio Monumental Isidro Romero Carbo, Guayaquil
Attendance: 0
Referee: Augusto Aragón

29 December 2020
20:15 UTC−5

LDU Quito	0–0	Barcelona
	Report
Penalties
Alcívar (penalty scored); Guerra (penalty missed); Piovi (penalty missed); Martínez Borja (penalty missed)	1–3	(penalty scored) Álvez; (penalty scored) Oyola; (penalty scored) Díaz

Estadio Rodrigo Paz Delgado, Quito
Attendance: 0
Referee: Guillermo Guerrero

Tied 1–1 on aggregate, Barcelona won on penalties.

== Aggregate table ==
Pos	Team	Pld	W	D	L	GF	GA	GD	Pts	Qualification or relegation
1	LDU Quito	30	18	5	7	60	33	+27	59	Qualification for Copa Libertadores group stage
2	Barcelona (C)	30	16	10	4	46	21	+25	58	Qualification for Copa Libertadores group stage
3	Independiente del Valle	30	16	6	8	62	43	+19	54	Qualification for Copa Libertadores second stage
4	Universidad Católica	30	14	9	7	48	28	+20	51	Qualification for Copa Libertadores first stage
5	Emelec	30	12	8	10	48	37	+11	44	Qualification for Copa Sudamericana first stage (Note: Since the 2020 Copa Ecuador was cancelled due to the COVID-19 pandemic in Ecuador, the spot awarded to its champions (Copa Sudamericana first stage) was passed over to the aggregate table fourth best-placed team not qualified for the Copa Libertadores.)
6	Guayaquil City	30	12	8	10	40	40	0	44	Qualification for Copa Sudamericana first stage
7	Macará	30	12	8	10	37	37	0	44	Qualification for Copa Sudamericana first stage
8	Aucas	30	11	9	10	59	55	+4	42	Qualification for Copa Sudamericana first stage
9	Técnico Universitario	30	11	9	10	28	27	+1	42	
10	Delfín	30	10	8	12	39	41	−2	38	
11	Mushuc Runa	30	8	7	15	33	45	−12	31	
12	Deportivo Cuenca	30	7	10	13	34	51	−17	31	
13	Orense	30	6	13	11	28	47	−19	31	
14	Olmedo	30	8	6	16	42	56	−14	30	
15	LDU Portoviejo (R)	30	8	6	16	39	59	−20	30	Relegation to Serie B
16	El Nacional (R)	30	6	8	16	26	49	−23	26	Relegation to Serie B

Source: LigaPro
Rules for classification: 1) Points, 2) Goal difference, 3) Goals for, 4) Away goals for, 5) Head-to-head record, 6) Drawing of lots.
(C) Champions; (R) Relegated

== Top goalscorers ==
Rank	Name	Club	Goals
1	(Colombia) Cristian Martínez Borja	LDU Quito	24
2	(Panama) Gabriel Torres	Independiente del Valle	16
3	(Argentina) Víctor Figueroa	Aucas	14
4	(Ecuador) José Cevallos	Emelec	13
4	(Argentina) Francisco Fydriszewski	LDU Portoviejo	13
6	(Colombia) Juan Sebastián Herrera	Macará	11
6	(Uruguay) Gonzalo Mastriani	Guayaquil City	11
6	(Argentina) Muriel Orlando	Mushuc Runa	11
9	(Uruguay) Facundo Barceló	Emelec	10
9	(Argentina) Damián Díaz	Barcelona	10
9	(United States) Michael Hoyos	Guayaquil City	10
9	(Argentina) Sergio López	Aucas	10

Source: Soccerway

== See also ==
- Ecuadorian Serie A
- 2020 in Ecuadorian football
- 2020 Ecuadorian Serie B
- 2020 Segunda Categoría
- 2020 Superliga Femenina
- 2020 Ecuadorian Women's Serie B
