= Pedro Perlaza =

Ecuadorian footballer (born 1991)

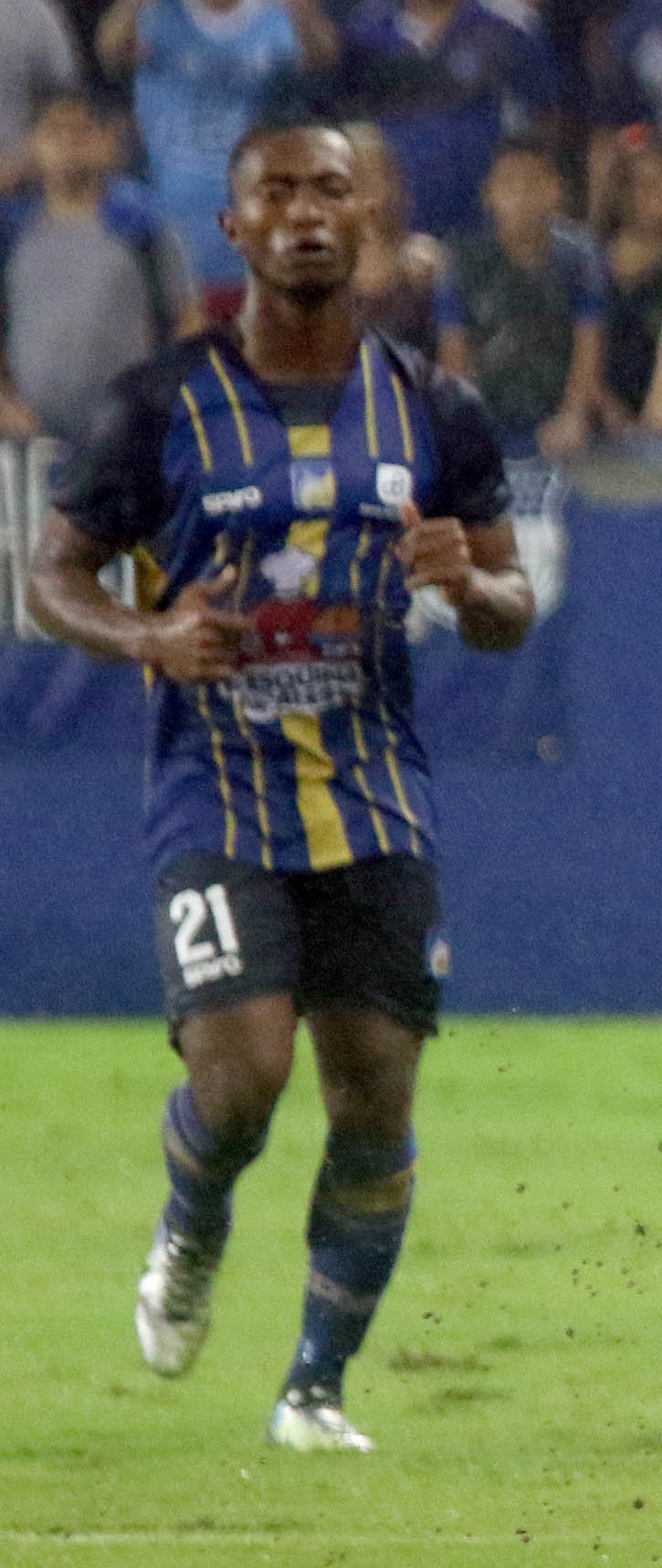

Personal information
- Full name: Pedro Pablo Perlaza Caicedo
- Date of birth: 3 February 1991 (age 35)
- Place of birth: Esmeraldas, Ecuador
- Height: 1.78 m (5 ft 10 in)
- Position: Defender

Team information
- Current team: Mushuc Runa

Senior career*
Years	Team	Apps	(Gls)
2009	Juventus	18	(0)
2010	Rocafuerte S.C.	20	(1)
2011	América de Quito	4	(0)
2012–2013	Rocafuerte S.C.	48	(7)
2014–2015	Esmeraldas Petrolero	28	(3)
2015	Deportivo Quevedo	17	(1)
2016	Macará	5	(0)
2016	L.D.U. Portoviejo	19	(0)
2017	Colón F.C.	15	(2)
2017–2019	Delfín	71	(3)
2020–2021	L.D.U. Quito	42	(0)
2022	Independiente del Valle	5	(0)
2022–2023	S.D. Aucas	3	(0)
2023–2024	Barcelona SC	3	(0)
2024	Delfín	1	(0)

International career^{‡}
2020–	Ecuador	3	(0)
- * Club domestic league appearances and goals as of September 25, 2021 ‡ National team caps and goals as of January 26, 2022

Pedro Pablo Perlaza Caicedo (born 3 February 1991) is an Ecuadorian footballer who plays for Mushuc Runa S.C. Perlaza gained worldwide attention when he was kidnapped and held for ransom by unknown assailants in December 2024. After being held for three days he was rescued after police engaged in a firefight with his captors in a remote jungle area near he Colombian border.

== Club career ==
He began his career with Juventus in 2009.

== Career statistics ==
As of September 25, 2020

Club	Season	League		Cup		International		Other		Total	
Club	Season	Apps	Goals	Apps	Goals	Apps	Goals	Apps	Goals	Apps	Goals
Juventus	2009	18	0	—	—	—	—	—	—	18	0
Rocafuerte S.C.	2010	20	1	—	—	—	—	—	—	20	1
América de Quito	2011	4	0	—	—	—	—	—	—	4	0
Rocafuerte S.C.	2012	21	3	—	—	—	—	—	—	21	3
Rocafuerte S.C.	2013	27	4	—	—	—	—	—	—	27	4
Rocafuerte S.C.	Total	48	7	—	—	—	—	—	—	48	7
Esmeraldas Petrolero	2014	22	1	—	—	—	—	—	—	22	1
Esmeraldas Petrolero	2015	6	2	—	—	—	—	—	—	6	2
Esmeraldas Petrolero	Total	28	3	—	—	—	—	—	—	28	3
Deportivo Quevedo	2015	17	1	—	—	—	—	—	—	17	1
Macará	2016	5	0	—	—	—	—	—	—	5	0
L.D.U. Portoviejo	2016	19	0	—	—	—	—	—	—	19	0
Colón F.C.	2017	15	2	—	—	—	—	—	—	15	2
Delfín	2017	1	0	—	—	—	—	—	—	1	0
Delfín	2018	38	1	—	—	6	0	—	—	44	1
Delfín	2019	32	2	9	0	4	0	—	—	45	2
Delfín	Total	71	3	9	0	10	0	—	—	90	3
L.D.U. Quito	2020	24	0	—	—	7	0	1	0	32	0
L.D.U. Quito	2021	18	0	—	—	8	0	0	0	26	0
L.D.U. Quito	Total	42	0	—	—	15	0	1	0	58	0
Career total		287	17	9	0	25	0	1	0	322	17

== Honours ==
Aucas

- Ecuadorian Serie A: 2022

Delfín

- Ecuadorian Serie A: 2019

LDU Quito

- Supercopa Ecuador: 2020, 2021
