= Pablo Trobbiani =

Argentine footballer

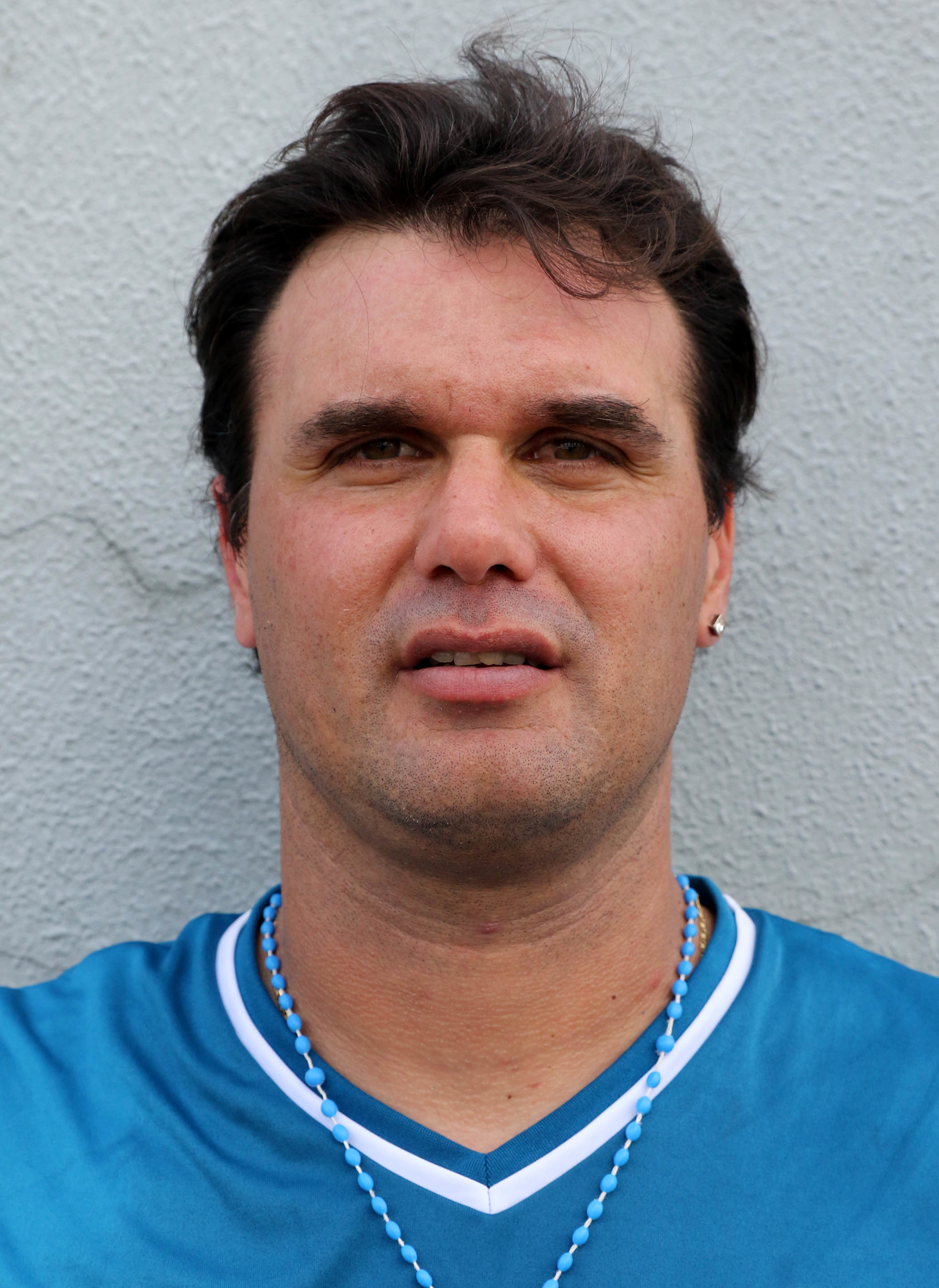
- Trobbiani in 2016

Personal information
- Full name: Pablo Marcelo Trobbiani Carnesella
- Date of birth: 28 December 1976 (age 49)
- Place of birth: Elche, Spain
- Height: 1.83 m (6 ft 0 in)
- Position: Midfielder

Team information
- Current team: Barcelona SC (manager)

Youth career
- Boca Juniors

Senior career*
Years	Team	Apps	(Gls)
1996	Boca Juniors	4	(0)
1997	Cobreloa	3	(0)
1997–1998	Málaga	6	(0)
1998	Badajoz	2	(0)
1998	Talleres	3	(0)
1999	San Fernando		
1999–2000	Castel di Sangro	9	(0)
2000–2001	Sabadell	4	(0)
2001–2002	Motril		
2002	San Fernando	6	(0)
2002–2003	Elche B		
2003–2004	Hellín		
2005	Villa del Río	6	(0)
2006	Treviso		

International career
1995	Argentina U20	1	(0)

Managerial career
- 2008–2010: Cienciano (assistant)
- 2012: Defensa y Justicia (assistant)
- 2013: Estudiantes LP (youth)
- 2014: Cobreloa (assistant)
- 2015–2016: River Ecuador (assistant)
- 2016: River Ecuador (interim)
- 2017–2018: Barcelona SC (youth)
- 2018–2020: Toreros
- 2020: LDU Portoviejo
- 2021: Olmedo
- 2022: Manta
- 2023–: Barcelona SC (assistant)
- 2025: Barcelona SC (interim)
- 2026: ADT
- 2026–: Barcelona SC
- * Club domestic league appearances and goals

Pablo Marcelo Trobbiani Carnesella (born 28 December 1976) is an Argentine football manager and former player who played as a centre midfielder. He is the current manager of Ecuadorian club Barcelona SC.

== Personal life ==
He is the son of the Argentine coach Marcelo Trobbiani.
