= Carlos Rodríguez (Uruguayan footballer) =

Uruguayan footballer (born 1990)

Personal information
- Full name: Carlos Emiliano Rodríguez Rodríguez
- Date of birth: 7 April 1990 (age 36)
- Place of birth: Salto, Uruguay
- Height: 1.85 m (6 ft 1 in)
- Position: Defender

Senior career*
Years	Team	Apps	(Gls)
2009–2012	Danubio	29	(0)
2011–2012	→ Miramar Misiones (loan)	44	(6)
2012–2014	Miramar Misiones	4	(0)
2014–2015	Boston River	37	(3)
2015–2019	Plaza Colonia	28	(2)
2016–2017	→ Olimpo (loan)	27	(4)
2017–2018	→ Tigre (loan)	19	(1)
2018	→ Peñarol (loan)	13	(1)
2019	→ LDU Quito (loan)	23	(3)
2020–2022	LDU Quito	4	(0)
2020	→ Delfín (loan)	9	(0)
2021	→ Peñarol (loan)	22	(2)
2022	→ Barcelona SC (loan)	28	(3)
2023–2024	Barcelona SC	32	(3)
2024–2025	Deportes Iquique	14	(0)
- * Club domestic league appearances and goals as of 11 December 2025

Carlos Emiliano Rodríguez Rodríguez (born 7 April 1990) is a Uruguayan professional footballer who plays as a defender.

== Career ==
Rodríguez began his career in Uruguay with Danubio. His first match arrived on 23 August 2009, he featured for the full duration of a 1–2 victory. He went on to make twenty-eight more appearances in his first two seasons with Danubio. In 2011, Rodríguez spent a season on loan with Miramar Misiones. A year later, Miramar Misiones signed Rodríguez permanently. He remained with Miramar Misiones for three seasons in total, featuring in forty-eight domestic fixtures and netting six goals. Ahead of the 2013–14 Uruguayan Segunda División season, Boston River completed the signing of defender Rodríguez.

He scored his first goal for the club on 22 April 2014 versus Central Español, the first of three in two campaigns. On 29 July 2015, Rodríguez joined Uruguayan Primera División side Plaza Colonia. Twenty-nine games and two goals followed in his opening season. In July 2016, Rodríguez left Uruguayan football to play for Argentina's Olimpo on loan. He netted goals against Godoy Cruz, Quilmes, Atlético de Rafaela and Independiente during 2016–17. For 2017–18, Rodríguez was loaned to fellow Argentine Primera División club Tigre. He scored his only goal in his second game, versus Chacarita Juniors.

On 17 July 2018, Rodríguez was loaned by Peñarol. He made fourteen appearances and scored one goal for them as they won the 2018 title. On 23 December, Ecuadorian Serie A side L.D.U. Quito announced the loan signing of Rodríguez. He scored goals against Deportivo Cuenca, Fuerza Amarilla and Universidad Católica in 2019 as they won the Copa Ecuador. He was soon signed permanently. In September 2020, having won the Supercopa Ecuador, Rodríguez was loaned to fellow Serie A team Delfín. He made his debut in a Copa Libertadores defeat to Defensa y Justicia on 18 September.

In the second half of 2024, Rodriguez moved to Chile and signed with Deportes Iquique.

== Career statistics ==
As of 11 October 2020.

Club statistics
Club	Season	League			Cup		Continental		Other		Total	
Club	Season	Division	Apps	Goals	Apps	Goals	Apps	Goals	Apps	Goals	Apps	Goals
Danubio	2009–10	Uruguayan Primera División	20	0	—		—		0	0	20	0
Danubio	2010–11	Uruguayan Primera División	9	0	—		—		0	0	9	0
Danubio	2011–12	Uruguayan Primera División	0	0	—		—		0	0	0	0
Danubio	Total		29	0	—		—		0	0	29	0
Boston River	2013–14	Segunda División	12	2	—		—		1 (Note: Appearance(s) in the Segunda División play-offs)	0	13	2
Boston River	2014–15	Segunda División	25	1	—		—		1	0	26	1
Boston River	Total		37	3	—		—		2	0	39	3
Plaza Colonia	2015–16	Uruguayan Primera División	28	2	—		—		1	0	29	2
Plaza Colonia	2016	Uruguayan Primera División	0	0	—		0	0	0	0	0	0
Plaza Colonia	2017	Uruguayan Primera División	0	0	—		—		0	0	0	0
Plaza Colonia	2018	Segunda División	0	0	—		—		0	0	0	0
Plaza Colonia	Total		28	2	—		0	0	1	0	29	2
Olimpo (loan)	2016–17	Argentine Primera División	27	4	2	0	—		0	0	29	4
Tigre (loan)	2017–18	Argentine Primera División	19	1	0	0	—		0	0	19	1
Peñarol (loan)	2018	Uruguayan Primera División	13	1	—		1 (Note: Appearance(s) in the Copa Sudamericana)	0	1	0	15	1
L.D.U. Quito (loan)	2019	Serie A	23	3	4	0	10 (Note: Appearance(s) in the Copa Libertadores)	0	0	0	37	3
L.D.U. Quito	2020	Serie A	4	0	0	0	2	0	1 (Note: Appearance(s) in the Supercopa Ecuador)	0	7	0
L.D.U. Quito	Total		27	3	4	0	12	0	1	0	44	3
Delfín (loan)	2020	Serie A	3	0	0	0	2	0	0	0	5	0
Career total			183	14	6	0	15	0	5	0	209	14

== Honours ==
Peñarol

- Uruguayan Primera División: 2018

L.D.U. Quito

- Copa Ecuador: 2019
- Supercopa Ecuador: 2020
