= Ricardo Dillon =

Argentine football manager

Personal information
- Full name: Ricardo Horacio Dillon
- Date of birth: 4 August 1964 (age 62)
- Place of birth: Mendoza, Argentina
- Positions: Midfielder; forward

Senior career*
Years	Team	Apps	(Gls)
1982–1983	Argentino de Mendoza		
1983–1984	Juventud Alianza		
1984–1985	Gimnasia y Esgrima de Mendoza		
1985–1986	Independiente Rivadavia		
1986–1990	Argentino de Mendoza		
1990–1996	San Martín de San Juan		
1996–1997	Atlético Tucumán	26	(6)
1997–1998	San Martín de San Juan		
1998–2000	San Martín de Mendoza	58	(15)
2000–2001	Godoy Cruz	29	(14)
2001–2003	San Martín de San Juan		

Managerial career
- 2011: Independiente Rivadavia
- 2011–2012: Sportivo Desamparados
- 2012–2015: Juventud Alianza
- 2015–2016: Sportivo Desamparados
- 2017: Güemes
- 2018–2019: Olmedo
- 2020: Mushuc Runa
- * Club domestic league appearances and goals

Ricardo Horacio Dillon (born 4 August 1964) is an Argentine football manager and former player who played as either a midfielder or a forward.

== Managerial career ==
Dillon started his managerial career with Independiente Rivadavia. In 2011, he was appointed head coach of Sportivo Desamparados in the Argentinean Primera B Nacional, a position he held until 2012. After that, he coached Juventud Alianza, Club Atlético Güemes, C.D. Olmedo, and Mushuc Runa S.C., where he currently coaches.
