= Édison Vega =

Ecuadorian footballer (born 1990)

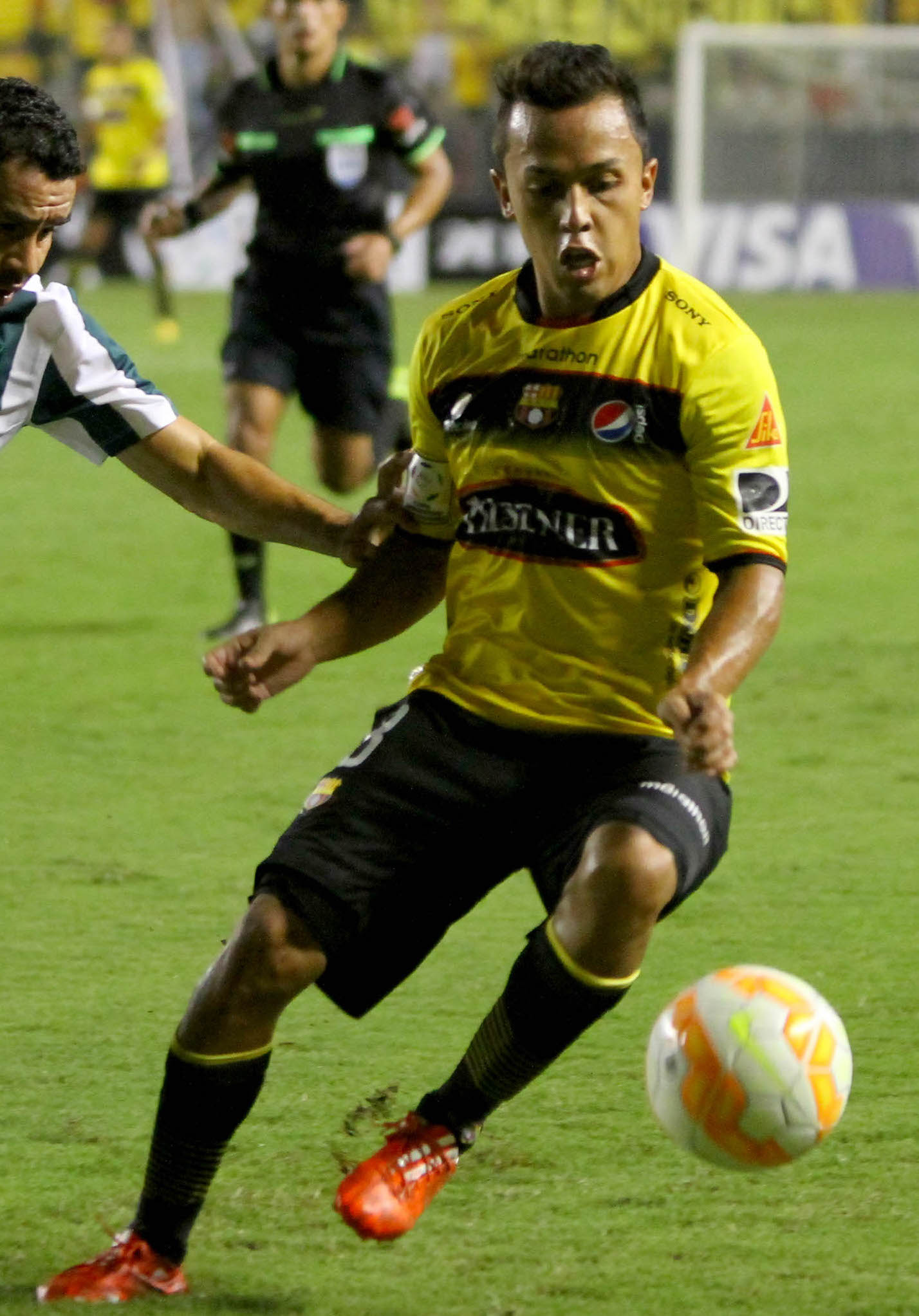
- Vega in the 2015 Copa Libertadores

Personal information
- Full name: Édison Fernando Vega Obando
- Date of birth: 8 March 1990 (age 36)
- Place of birth: Ibarra, Ecuador
- Height: 1.68 m (5 ft 6 in)
- Position: Midfielder

Team information
- Current team: Delfín S.C.

Youth career
- 2004: ESPOLI
- 2005–2006: Ibarra F.C.

Senior career*
Years	Team	Apps	(Gls)
2007–2011	Imbabura	149	(10)
2012–2014	Deportivo Quito	105	(1)
2015	Barcelona SC	36	(1)
2016–2020	L.D.U. Quito	141	(1)
2021–2024	Aucas	15	(0)
2024	Técnico Universitario	0	(0)
2025–	Delfín	2	(0)

International career^{‡}
2018–	Ecuador	3	(0)
- * Club domestic league appearances and goals as of December 16, 2020 ‡ National team caps and goals as of November 20, 2018

Édison Fernando Vega Obando (born 8 March 1990) is an Ecuadorian footballer who plays for Delfín.

== Club career ==
Vega began playing football with Imbabura. He joined Deportivo Quito in 2012. In 2015 he played for Barcelona SC.

He joined L.D.U. Quito in 2016.

== International career ==
He made his international debut for the Ecuador national football team in a 2–0 victory over Jamaica on September 7, 2018.

== Honours ==
LDU Quito

- Ecuadorian Serie A: 2018
- Copa Ecuador: 2019
- Supercopa Ecuador: 2020

Aucas

- Ecuadorian Serie A: 2022
