= Richard Calderón =

Ecuadorian footballer (born 1993)

Personal information
- Full name: Richard Rodrigo Calderón Llori
- Date of birth: 25 June 1993 (age 33)
- Place of birth: Lago Agrio, Ecuador
- Height: 1.78 m (5 ft 10 in)
- Position: Midfielder

Team information
- Current team: Deportivo Cuenca
- Number: 8

Youth career
- 2010: LDU

Senior career*
Years	Team	Apps	(Gls)
2011–2012	LDU	7	(1)
2012	Espoli	9	(0)
2013	Deportivo Quito		
2013	Liga de Cuenca	8	(4)
2014	LDU		
2015	Deportivo Quito	39	(5)
2016–2020	Barcelona	50	(1)
2018	→ Universidad Católica (loan)	35	(2)
2020	→ Delfín (loan)	7	(1)
2021	Macará	25	(2)
2022–2024	Orense	71	(7)
2025–	Deportivo Cuenca	7	(0)
- * Club domestic league appearances and goals as of 20 August 2025

Richard Rodrigo Calderón Llori (born June 25, 1993, in Lago Agrio, Ecuador) is an Ecuadorian professional footballer who plays as midfielder for C.D. Cuenca

Playing for LDU, he made his professional debut on 16 October 2011, starting in a 3–0 home win against Liga de Loja, and scored his first goal on 27 November 2011, in a 1–2 home loss against Imbabura.

Playing for Barcelona, Calderón made his Copa Libertadores debut on 20 April 2017, starting in a 1–1 home drawn against Botafogo. He played another Copa Libertadores matches against traditional South American teams, like Estudiantes de La Plata, Atlético Nacional, Olimpia and Santos.

== Career statistics ==
As of 23 September 2020

Club	Season	League			Cup		Continental		Other		Total	
Club	Season	Division	Apps	Goals	Apps	Goals	Apps	Goals	Apps	Goals	Apps	Goals
LDU	2011	Liga PRO Ecuador	7	1	—		—		—		7	1
Deportivo Quito	2015	Liga PRO Ecuador	39	5	—		—		—		39	5
Barcelona	2016	Liga PRO Ecuador	22	0	—		0	0	—		22	0
Barcelona	2017	Liga PRO Ecuador	19	0	—		4 (Note: All appearance(s) in Copa Libertadores)	0	—		23	0
Barcelona	2019	Liga PRO Ecuador	9	1	—		1	0	—		10	1
Barcelona	Total		50	0	0	0	5	0	0	0	55	1
Universidad Católica	2018	Liga PRO Ecuador	35	2	—		—		—		35	2
Delfín	2020	Liga PRO Ecuador	7	1	—		2	0	1 (Note: All appearance(s) in Supercopa Ecuador)	0	10	1
Career total			138	10	0	0	7	0	1	0	146	10
