= Estadio Guillermo Albornoz =

Stadium in Ecuador

Coordinates: 00°03′03.26″N 78°08′19.77″W

Estadio Guillermo Albornoz is a multi-use stadium in Cayambe, Ecuador. It is currently used mostly for football matches and is the home stadium of Cuniburo Fútbol Club. The stadium holds 12,000 people.
