= Marcos Caicedo =

Ecuadorian footballer (born 1991)

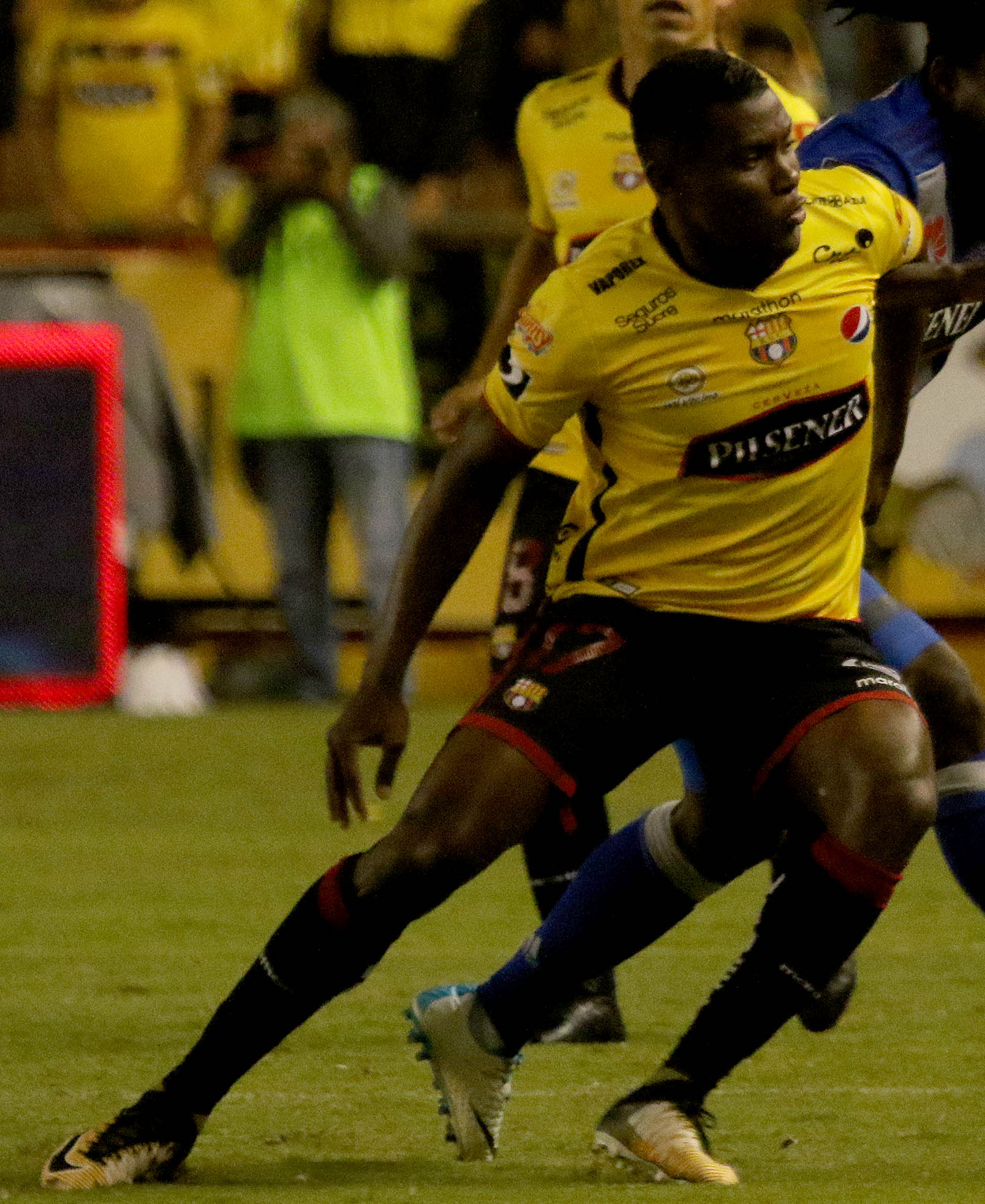

Personal information
- Full name: Marcos Jackson Caicedo Caicedo
- Date of birth: 10 November 1991 (age 35)
- Place of birth: Guayaquil, Ecuador
- Height: 1.78 m (5 ft 10 in)
- Position: Left winger

Team information
- Current team: Emelec

Youth career
- 2005–2009: Emelec

Senior career*
Years	Team	Apps	(Gls)
2007–2011	Emelec	84	(8)
2012	El Nacional	38	(19)
2013–2014	Emelec	43	(11)
2014–2017	León	25	(1)
2015–2016	→ Sinaloa (loan)	15	(1)
2016	→ Zacatecas (loan)	19	(0)
2016	→ Barcelona SC (loan)	21	(2)
2017–2019	Barcelona SC	91	(7)
2020–2022	L.D.U. Quito	25	(0)
2021	→ Guayaquil City (loan)	0	(0)
2022–	Emelec	0	(0)

International career^{‡}
2016–	Ecuador	9	(1)
- * Club domestic league appearances and goals as of 29 December 2020 ‡ National team caps and goals as of 14 November 2019

Marcos Jackson Caicedo Caicedo (born 10 November 1991) is an Ecuadorian professional footballer who plays as a winger for C.S. Emelec.

== International career ==
=== International goals ===
Scores and results list Ecuador's goal tally first.

No	Date	Venue	Opponent	Score	Result	Competition
1.	22 February 2017	Estadio George Capwell, Guayaquil, Ecuador	Honduras	1–1	3–1	Friendly
