= Juan Diego Rojas =

Ecuadorian football player (born 1992)

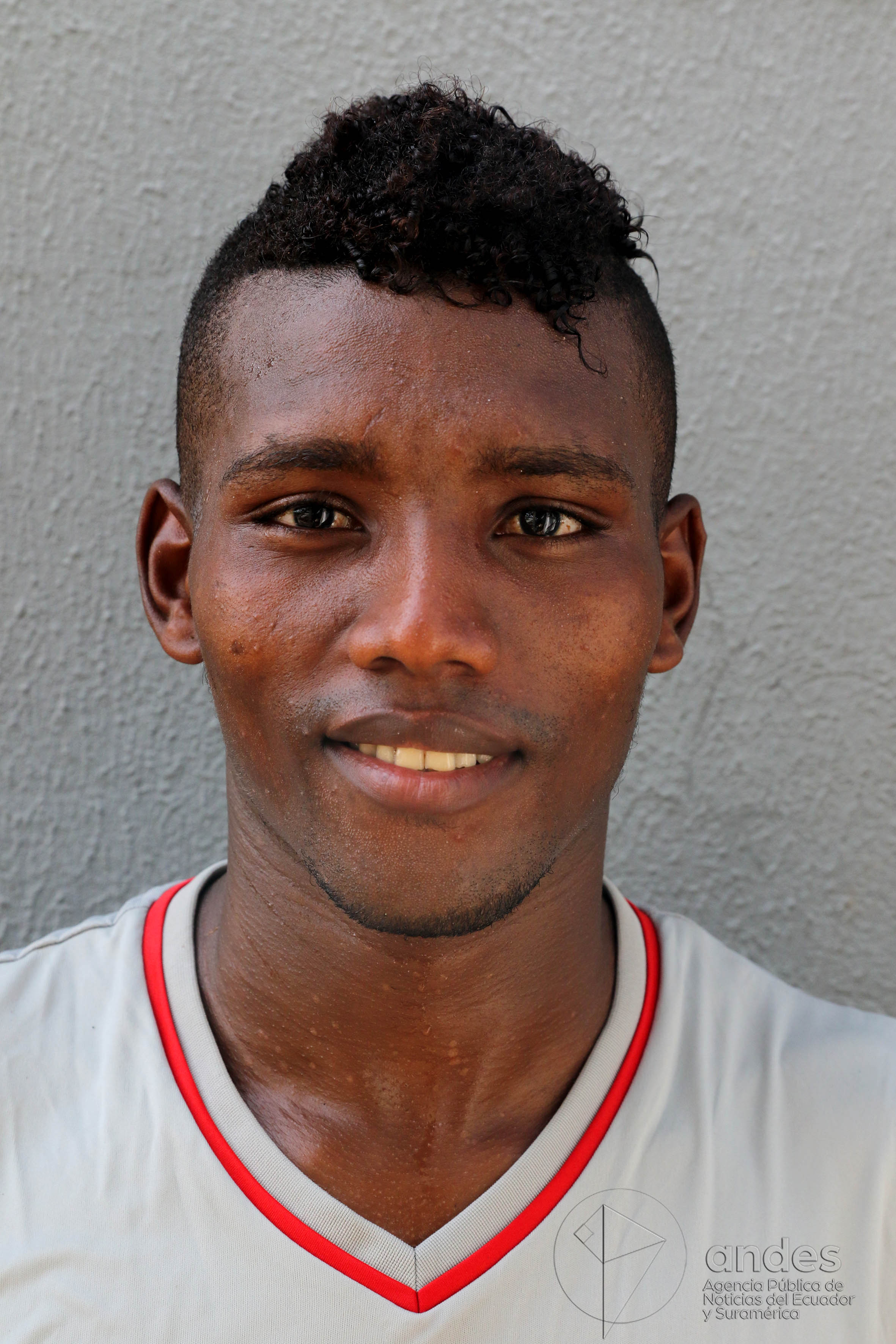

Personal information
- Full name: Juan Diego Rojas Caicedo
- Date of birth: 23 December 1992 (age 33)
- Place of birth: Ecuador
- Height: 1.68 m (5 ft 6 in)
- Positions: Midfielder; winger; forward

Team information
- Current team: Delfín

Senior career*
Years	Team	Apps	(Gls)
2013–2014	Independiente del Valle	1	(0)
2015	Deportivo Quito	39	(10)
2016–2017	Guayaquil City	70	(10)
2018	Deportivo Cuenca	42	(9)
2019–	Delfín	68	(3)
- * Club domestic league appearances and goals

Juan Diego Rojas Caicedo (born 23 December 1992) is an Ecuadorian footballer who plays as a midfielder, winger, or attacker for Delfín.

== Career ==
Before the 2019 season, Rojas signed for Delfín in Ecuador, helping them win their only top flight title. On 22 January 2019, he earned comparisons to Brazilian international Neymar after doing backwards stepovers over the ball while it was rolling backwards during a 3–0 win over Paraguayan side Nacional (Asunción).
