= Pablo Repetto =

Uruguayan football manager (born 1974)

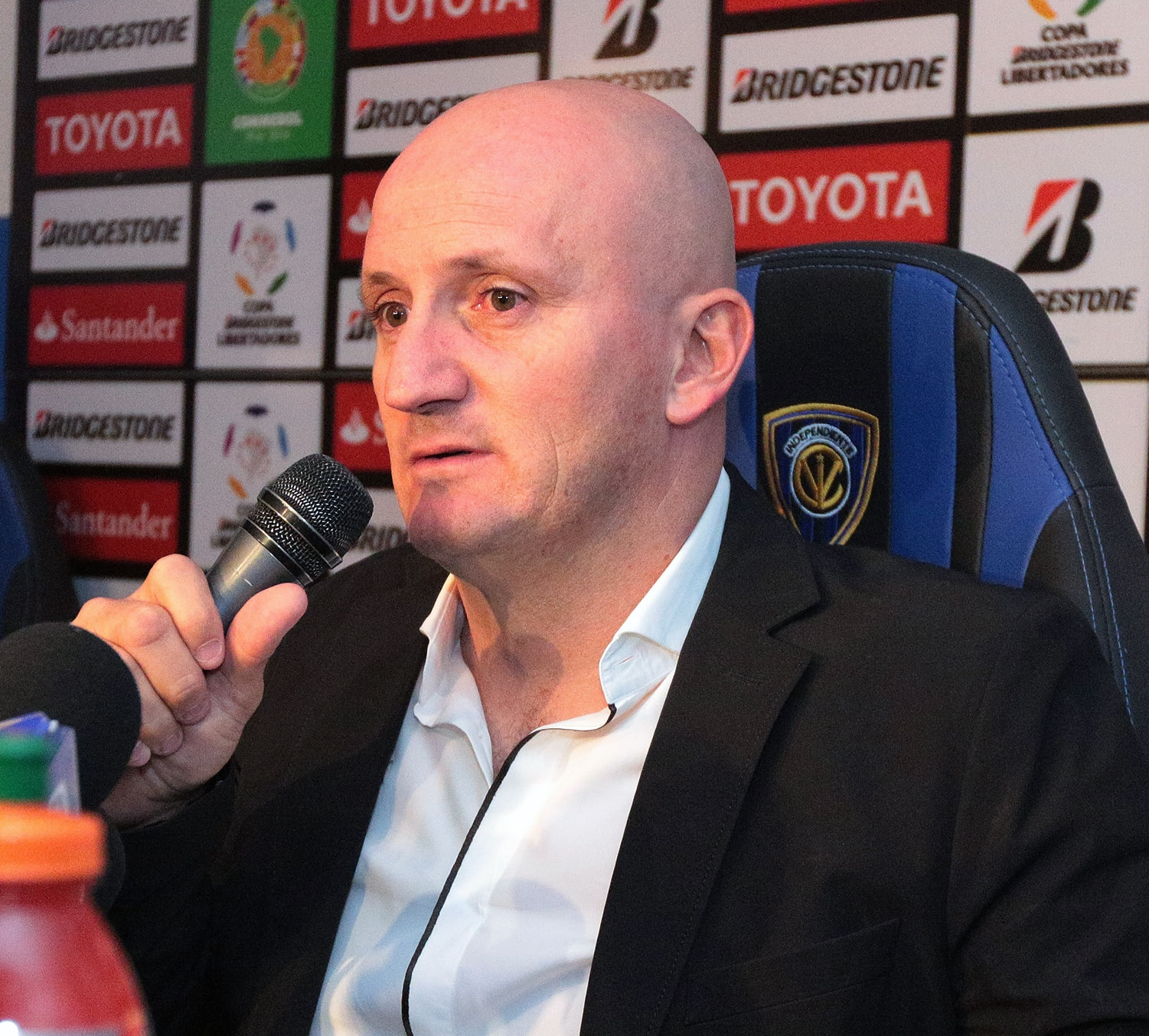
- Repetto with Independiente del Valle in 2016

Personal information
- Full name: Pablo Eduardo Repetto Aquino
- Date of birth: 14 March 1974 (age 52)
- Place of birth: Montevideo, Uruguay
- Position: Midfielder

Team information
- Current team: Santa Fe (manager)

Youth career
- 1988–19XX: Montevideo Wanderers
- Racing Montevideo
- Fénix

Senior career*
Years	Team	Apps	(Gls)
1995–2000	Fénix		
2000	Villa Teresa		

Managerial career
- 2002–2006: Fénix (youth)
- 2006–2008: Fénix
- 2008–2009: Cerro
- 2009: Blooming
- 2009–2010: Cerro
- 2010–2011: Defensor
- 2012–2016: Independiente del Valle
- 2016: Baniyas
- 2017: Olimpia
- 2017–2021: LDU Quito
- 2022: Nacional
- 2023–2024: Santos Laguna
- 2024: Atlético Nacional
- 2026–: Santa Fe
- * Club domestic league appearances and goals

Pablo Eduardo Repetto Aquino (born 14 March 1974) is a Uruguayan football manager and former player who played as a midfielder. He is the current manager of Colombian club Santa Fe.

== Playing career ==
Born in Montevideo, Repetto began his career at Montevideo Wanderers' youth setup in 1988. After playing for the youth sides of Racing Club de Montevideo, he made his senior debut with Fénix in 1995, aged 20.

In 1998, Repetto fractured his tibia and fibula, which kept him sidelined for one and a half year. In 2000, after six unsuccessful months at Villa Teresa, he retired.

== Managerial career ==
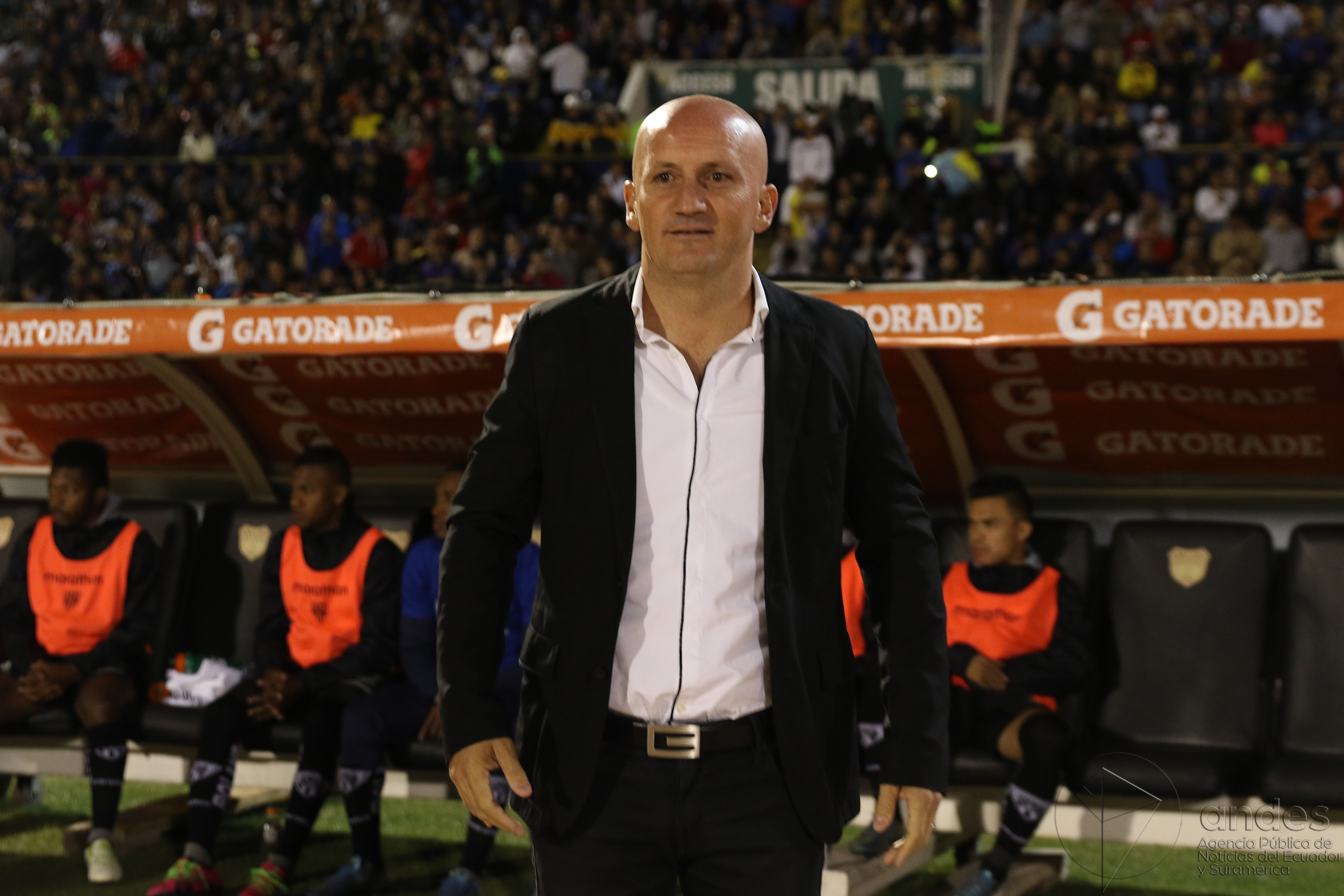
Repetto with Independiente del Valle in 2016

After retiring, Repetto acquired a coaching license and returned to his first club Fénix as manager of the youth setup in 2002. In July 2006, he took over the first team in Segunda División, and achieved promotion at the end of the season.

Ahead of the 2008–09 season, Repetto was named in charge of Cerro also in Primera División. The following 20 February, he was appointed at Bolivian side Blooming, but left the club in June.

On 16 December 2009, Repetto returned to Cerro, and led the side in the 2010 Copa Libertadores. He left the following May, and was appointed at the helm of fellow league team Defensor Sporting shortly after.

Repetto won the 2010 Torneo Apertura with Defensor, but lost the Final to Nacional. On 9 December 2011, he was dismissed.

On 24 September 2012, after nearly a year without a club, Repetto took over Ecuadorian Serie A side Independiente del Valle. He led the side to the 2016 Copa Libertadores Finals before being presented as manager of Emirati side Baniyas on 31 July of that year.

Repetto was relieved of his duties on 21 October 2016, and returned to South America on 15 December to take over Olimpia in Paraguay. He was sacked the following 24 February, after only six matches, and was presented as manager of LDU Quito on 5 July 2017.

Repetto led LDU to titles of Ecuadorian Serie A, Copa Ecuador and Supercopa Ecuador during his period at the club, but left on a mutual consent on 16 June 2021. On 11 December, he took over Nacional back in his home country.

Repetto led Nacional to their 2022 Primera División title, but still left the club on 9 November of that year.

== Managerial statistics ==
As of 20 November 2026

Managerial record by team and tenure
Team	Nat.	From	To	Record								Ref
Team	Nat.	From	To	G	W	D	L	GF	GA	GD	Win %	Ref
Fénix	(Uruguay)	July 2006	February 2008	45	20	16	9	59	40	+19	44.44	
Cerro	(Uruguay)	July 2008	February 2009	15	6	5	4	20	12	+8	40.00	
Blooming	(Bolivia)	20 February 2009	30 June 2009	19	6	6	7	20	25	−5	31.58	
Cerro	(Uruguay)	18 December 2009	May 2010	21	11	4	6	33	23	+10	52.38	
Defensor Sporting	(Uruguay)	May 2010	9 December 2011	52	27	11	14	88	49	+39	51.92	
Independiente del Valle	(Ecuador)	24 September 2012	29 July 2016	198	100	44	54	306	211	+95	50.51	
Baniyas	(United Arab Emirates)	31 July 2016	21 October 2016	8	0	2	6	6	14	−8	0.00	
Olimpia	(Paraguay)	15 December 2016	24 February 2017	6	3	1	2	8	4	+4	50.00	
LDU Quito	(Ecuador)	5 July 2017	16 June 2021	197	93	58	46	318	213	+105	47.21	
Nacional	(Uruguay)	16 December 2021	9 November 2022	51	31	10	10	86	36	+50	60.78	
Santos Laguna	(Mexico)	24 April 2023	11 February 2024	31	9	6	16	51	64	−13	29.03	
Atlético Nacional	(Colombia)	28 February 2024	27 August 2024	17	8	4	5	21	15	+6	47.06	
Santa Fe	(Colombia)	9 December 2025	present	61	24	23	14	86	59	+27	39.34	
Career total				721	338	190	193	1,102	765	+337	46.88	—

== Honours ==
=== Manager ===
Fénix

- Uruguayan Segunda División: 2006–07

Defensor Sporting

- Apertura: 2010

LDU Quito

- Ecuadorian Serie A: 2018
- Copa Ecuador: 2019
- Supercopa Ecuador: 2020

Nacional

- Intermedio: 2022
- Clausura: 2022
- Uruguayan Primera División: 2022
