= Franklin Guerra =

Ecuadorian footballer (born 1992)

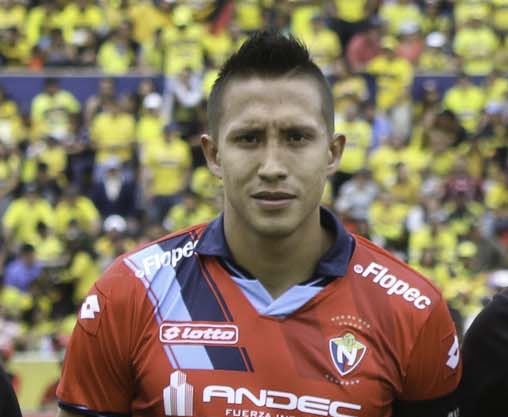

Personal information
- Full name: Franklin Joshua Guerra Cedeño
- Date of birth: 12 April 1992 (age 34)
- Place of birth: Portoviejo, Ecuador
- Height: 1.85 m (6 ft 1 in)
- Positions: Midfielder; defender

Team information
- Current team: Barcelona S.C.
- Number: 15

Youth career
- 2004–2006: L.D.U. Portoviejo
- 2009: El Nacional

Senior career*
Years	Team	Apps	(Gls)
2010–2017	El Nacional	228	(4)
2018–2023	L.D.U. Quito	141	(5)
2023	→ Universidad Católica (loan)	29	(1)
2024–	Barcelona SC	2	(0)

International career^{‡}
2020–	Ecuador	0	(0)
- * Club domestic league appearances and goals as of August 20, 2025 ‡ National team caps and goals as of October 13, 2020

Franklin Joshua Guerra Cedeño (born 12 April 1992) is an Ecuadorian footballer who plays for Barcelona S.C.

== Club career ==
He began his career with El Nacional in 2010.

== Career statistics ==
As of September 19, 2021

Club	Season	League		Cup		International		Other		Total	
Club	Season	Apps	Goals	Apps	Goals	Apps	Goals	Apps	Goals	Apps	Goals
El Nacional	2010	12	0	—	—	—	—	—	—	12	0
El Nacional	2011	26	0	—	—	—	—	—	—	26	0
El Nacional	2012	13	0	—	—	2	0	—	—	15	0
El Nacional	2013	38	0	—	—	—	—	—	—	38	0
El Nacional	2014	40	0	—	—	—	—	—	—	40	0
El Nacional	2015	24	0	—	—	—	—	—	—	24	0
El Nacional	2016	36	1	—	—	—	—	—	—	36	1
El Nacional	2017	39	3	—	—	2	0	—	—	41	3
El Nacional	Total	228	4	—	—	4	0	—	—	232	4
L.D.U. Quito	2018	44	1	—	—	6	0	—	—	50	1
L.D.U. Quito	2019	27	2	7	1	4	0	—	—	38	3
L.D.U. Quito	2020	22	1	—	—	5	1	1	0	28	2
L.D.U. Quito	2021	24	0	—	—	9	1	—	—	33	1
L.D.U. Quito	2022	24	1	2	0	5	0	—	—	31	1
L.D.U. Quito	Total	141	5	9	1	29	2	1	0	180	8
Career total		369	9	9	1	33	2	1	0	412	12

== Honours ==
LDU Quito

- Ecuadorian Serie A: 2018
- Copa Ecuador: 2019
- Supercopa Ecuador: 2020, 2021
