= Carlos Garcés (Ecuadorian footballer) =

Ecuadorian footballer (born 1990)

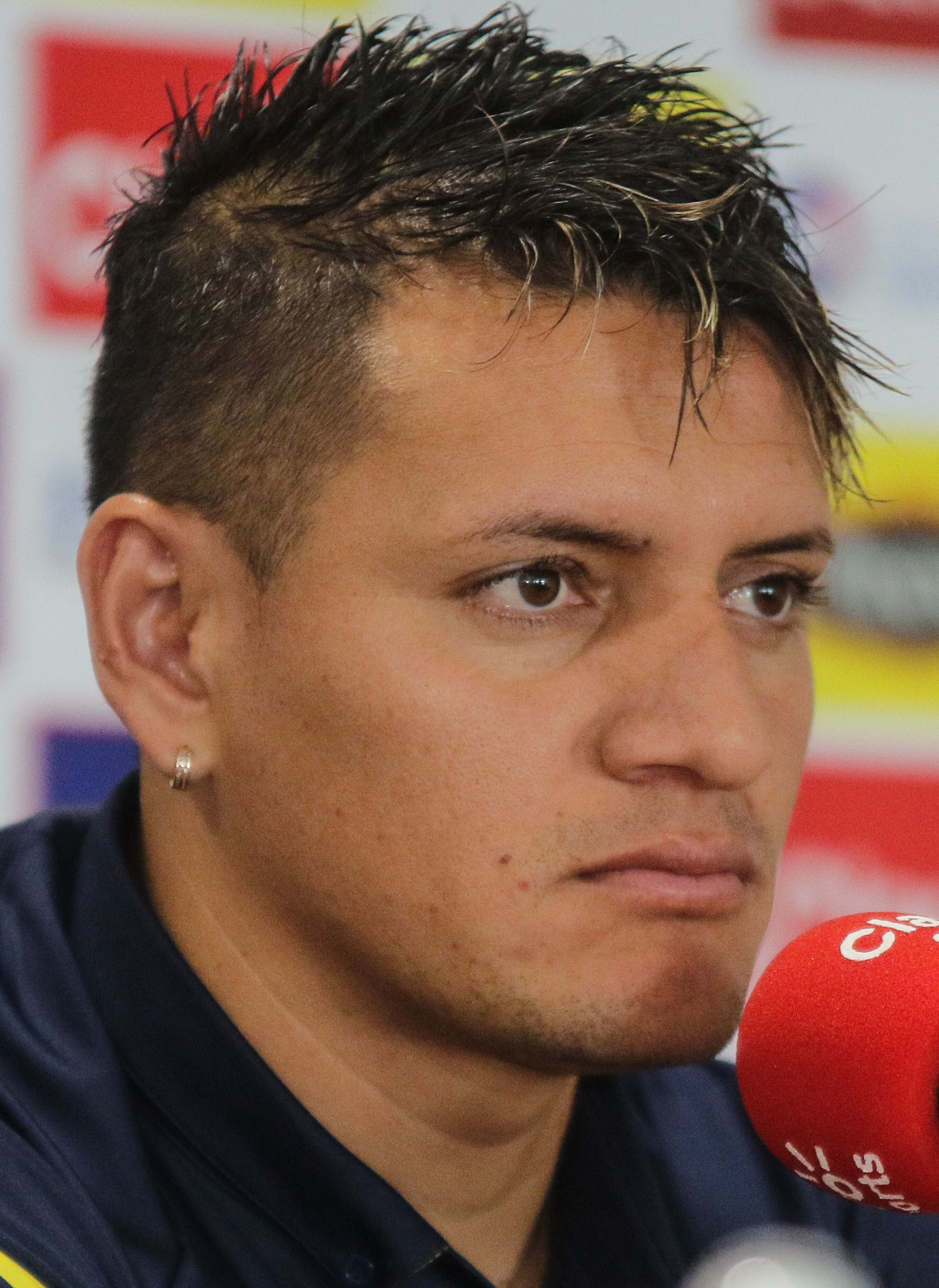
- Garcés with Ecuador in 2017

Personal information
- Full name: Carlos Jhon Garcés Acosta
- Date of birth: 1 March 1990 (age 36)
- Place of birth: Manta, Ecuador
- Height: 1.84 m (6 ft 0 in)
- Position: Forward

Team information
- Current team: Cienciano
- Number: 21

Youth career
- 2005–2007: Manta

Senior career*
Years	Team	Apps	(Gls)
2008–2012	Manta	84	(15)
2010	→ L.D.U. Portoviejo (loan)	26	(5)
2013	LDU Quito	23	(3)
2014	Deportivo Quito	12	(3)
2014	L.D.U. Portoviejo	18	(8)
2015	Deportivo Cuenca	18	(8)
2015–2016	Atlante	53	(24)
2017–2020	Delfín	134	(63)
2021–2022	Barcelona S.C.	42	(6)
2022	→ 9 de Octubre F.C. (loan)	12	(2)
2023–	Cienciano	108	(53)

International career^{‡}
2017–2019	Ecuador	3	(0)
- * Club domestic league appearances and goals as of 20 March 2026 ‡ National team caps and goals as of 17 December 2019

Carlos Jhon Garcés Acosta (born 1 March 1990) is an Ecuadorian professional footballer who plays as a forward for Cienciano. He made three appearances for the Ecuador national team.

== Career statistics ==
=== Club ===
As of 20 March 2026.

Appearances and goals by club, season and competition
Club	Division	League			Cup		Continental		Total	
Club	Division	Season	Apps	Goals	Apps	Goals	Apps	Goals	Apps	Goals
Manta	Ecuadorian Serie B	2007	0	0	—		—		0	0
Manta	Ecuadorian Serie B	2008	1	0	—		—		1	0
Manta	Ecuadorian Serie A	2009	16	1	—		—		16	1
L.D.U. Portoviejo	Ecuadorian Serie B	2010	26	5	—		—		26	5
Manta	Ecuadorian Serie A	2011	25	4	—		—		25	4
Manta	Ecuadorian Serie A	2012	42	10	—		—		42	10
Manta	Total		84	15	0	0	0	0	84	15
LDU Quito	Ecuadorian Serie A	2013	23	3	—		2	0	25	3
Deportivo Quito	Ecuadorian Serie A	2014	12	3	—		—		12	3
L.D.U. Portoviejo	Ecuadorian Serie B	2014	18	8	—		—		18	8
L.D.U. Portoviejo	Total		44	13	0	0	0	0	44	13
Deportivo Cuenca	Ecuadorian Serie A	2015	18	8	0	0	0	0	18	8
Atlante	Ascenso MX	2015-16	30	18	4	3	0	0	34	21
Atlante	Ascenso MX	2016-17	23	6	3	0	0	0	26	6
Atlante	Total		53	24	7	3	0	0	60	27
Delfín	Ecuadorian Serie A	2017	35	19	—		—		35	19
Delfín	Ecuadorian Serie A	2018	41	20	—		5	0	46	20
Delfín	Ecuadorian Serie A	2019	34	15	9	5	4	3	47	23
Delfín	Ecuadorian Serie A	2020	24	9	1	1	7	1	32	11
Delfín	Total		134	63	10	6	16	4	160	73
Barcelona S.C.	Ecuadorian Serie A	2021	28	5	2	1	12	3	42	9
Barcelona S.C.	Ecuadorian Serie A	2022	14	1	0	0	12	2	26	3
Barcelona S.C.	Total		42	6	2	1	24	5	68	12
9 de Octubre F.C.	Ecuadorian Serie A	2022	12	2	4	0	0	0	16	2
Cienciano	Liga 1	2023	31	16	0	0	1	0	32	16
Cienciano	Liga 1	2024	34	19	0	0	0	0	34	19
Cienciano	Liga 1	2025	30	9	0	0	7	3	37	12
Cienciano	Liga 1	2026	8	7	0	0	1	0	9	7
Cienciano	Total		103	51	0	0	9	3	112	54
Career total			525	188	23	10	51	12	599	210

== Honors ==
Manta

- Serie B: 2008

Delfín

- Serie A: 2019

Individual

- Ascenso MX top scorer: 2015 Apertura
