= Estadio Christian Benítez Betancourt =

Football stadium in Guayaquil, Ecuador

Christian Benítez Betancourt
- Interactive map of Christian Benítez Betancourt
- Full name: Estadio Christian Benítez Betancourt
- Location: Guayaquil, Ecuador
- Coordinates: 2°6′10″S 79°54′14″W
- Capacity: 10,152
- Surface: grass

Tenant
- Guayaquil City F.C.

Estadio Christian Benítez Betancourt is a football stadium in Guayaquil, Ecuador. It was named after footballer Christian Benítez. Guayaquil City F.C. play their home games at the 10,152-capacity stadium.
