= Cristian Martínez (Colombian footballer) =

Colombian footballer (born 1988)

Personal information
- Full name: Cristian Martínez Borja
- Date of birth: 3 March 1988 (age 38)
- Place of birth: Quibdó, Colombia
- Height: 1.82 m (6 ft 0 in)
- Position: Forward

Team information
- Current team: Orense

Senior career*
| Years | Team | Apps | (Gls) |
| 2006 | Patriotas | 11 | (0) |
| 2007 | Internacional | 0 | (0) |
| 2008 | Mogi Mirim | 0 | (0) |
| 2008 | Guaratinguetá | 17 | (1) |
| 2009–2012 | Caxias do Sul | 7 | (1) |
| 2010 | → Flamengo (loan) | 7 | (0) |
| 2011–2012 | → Red Star Belgrade (loan) | 43 | (11) |
| 2012–2013 | Santa Fe | 31 | (6) |
| 2013–2015 | Veracruz | 47 | (9) |
| 2015 | → BUAP (loan) | 32 | (10) |
| 2016–2018 | América de Cali | 78 | (35) |
| 2018–2021 | L.D.U. Quito | 85 | (36) |
| 2021–2022 | Junior | 16 | (1) |
| 2022–2023 | Universidad Católica | 41 | (11) |
| 2023 | Orense | 12 | (1) |
| 2024 | Patriotas Boyaca | 29 | (6) |
| Total | | 456 | (128) |
- * Club domestic league appearances and goals as of 20 February 2024

Cristian Martínez Borja (born 1 January 1988) is a Colombian professional footballer who plays as a forward for Aguilas Doradas.

== Career ==
Born in Quibdó, Colombia, Martínez made his senior debut with Patriotas playing in the 2006 Categoría Primera B season, before he moved to Brazilian club Internacional in 2007. In January 2008 he joined Mogi Mirim. He scored one goal for Mogi Mirim in 2008 Campeonato Paulista Série A2. Then he played in Guaratinguetá, where he scored one goal in Campeonato Brasileiro Série C. In 2009, he joined Caxias do Sul and later in 2010 he was loaned to Flamengo.

He came to Serbia in December 2010 and signed a loan deal with Red Star Belgrade after being recommended to the club by their former player Dejan Petković. Using Serbian transliteration his name is written as Kristijan Borha (Кристијан Борха) .

On 11 April 2012, he scored a goal in the derby against Partizan after coming on from the bench. This was Borja's first goal in a derby, meanwhile Red Star went through after winning both Cup matches 2–0.

On 18 June 2012, he stopped playing for Red Star and went back to Caxias do Sul. On 3 August he signed a one-year contract with Colombian side Santa Fe.

On 15 August 2013, he joined Mexican side Tiburones Rojos de Veracruz playing in the Liga MX.

== Honours ==
Red Star Belgrade

- Serbian Cup: 2011–12

Santa Fe

- Superliga Colombiana: 2013

Veracruz

- Copa MX: Clausura 2016

América de Cali

- Categoría Primera B: 2016

LDU Quito

- Ecuadorian Serie A: 2018
- Copa Ecuador: 2019
- Supercopa Ecuador: 2020, 2021
