= L.D.U. Portoviejo =

Association football club in Ecuador

Liga de Portoviejo
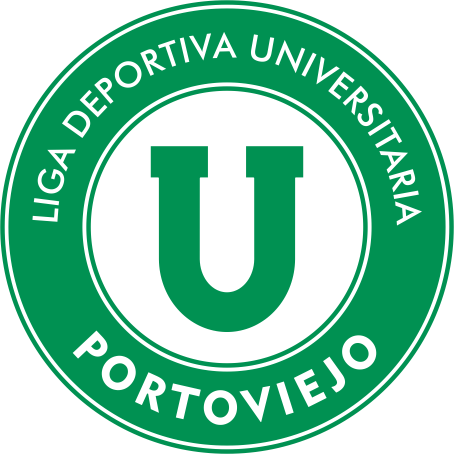
- Full name: Liga Deportiva Universitaria de Portoviejo
- Nickname(s): La Capira; El Ídolo de Manabí
- Founded: November 15, 1969; 55 years ago
- Ground: Estadio Reales Tamarindos
- Capacity: 18,000
- Chairman: Byron Briones
- Manager: Marcelo Javier Zuleta
- League: Serie B
- 2020: Serie A, 15th (relegated)
Home colours	Away colours

Liga Deportiva Universitaria de Portoviejo is a professional football club from the city of Portoviejo, Ecuador. They play in the Serie A, Their rival team is Delfín, against whom they contest the El Clásico Manabita.

== Achievements ==
- Serie B
  - Winner (5): 1972 E1, 1976 E2, 1980 E2, 1992 E1, 2000
  - Runner-up (6): 1981 E2, 1990 E1, 1991 E1, 1993, 1999, 2008, 2019

== Players ==
As of 28 January 2025

Note: Flags indicate national team as defined under FIFA eligibility rules; some limited exceptions apply. Players may hold more than one non-FIFA nationality.

No.	Pos.	Nation	Player
1	GK	ECU	Steeven Macías
10	MF	ECU	Jean García
12	GK	ECU	Júnior Pereira
16	DF	ECU	Márcos Cangá
17	DF	ECU	Jefferson Castro
19	FW	PAR	César Espínola
21	DF	ECU	Jimmy Gómez
21	MF	ECU	Daniel Uquillas
23	DF	ECU	Pablo Cifuente
28	DF	ECU	Efrén Proaño
29	GK	ECU	Manuel Mendoza
30	MF	ECU	Elian Arboleda
35	FW	ECU	Cristhian Cuero
51	MF	ECU	Adrián Santana

No.	Pos.	Nation	Player
53	DF	ESP	Samuel Hernández
68	FW	ECU	Steeven Molina
-	GK	ECU	Francisco Mendoza
-	GK	ECU	Carlos Ortiz
-	GK	ECU	Juan José Ortíz
-	DF	ECU	Said Macías
-	DF	ECU	Pedro Cuero
-	MF	ECU	Osman Pico
-	MF	ECU	Anderson Ozaeta
-	MF	ECU	Abdala Bucaram
-	FW	ECU	Roberto Valarezo
-	FW	ECU	Jairon Bonett
-	FW	COL	Jhojan Riascos

== Former players ==
- (Spain) Juan Manuel Basurco
