= 2021 Liga Deportiva Universitaria de Quito season =

L.D.U. Quito
2021 season
- President: Guillermo Romero
- Manager: Pablo Marini
- Stadium: Estadio Rodrigo Paz Delgado
- LigaPro: 6th
- Conmebol Libertadores: Group Stage
- Conmebol Sudamericana: Quarter-finals
- Supercopa Ecuador: Champions (2nd Title)
- Top goalscorer: League: Luis Amarilla (9 goals); All: Luis Amarilla (15 goals)
Home colours	Away colours	Third colours

Liga Deportiva Universitaria de Quito's 2021 season was the club's 91st year of existence, the 68th year in professional football, and the 60th in the top level of professional football in Ecuador.

== Club ==
=== Personnel ===
President: Guillermo Romero
Honorary President: Rodrigo Paz
President of the Executive Commission: Esteban Paz
Sporting manager: Santiago Jácome

=== Coaching staff ===
Manager: Pablo Marini
Assistant manager: Ariel de Armas, Agustín Marini
Physical trainer:Tomás Marini, Gastón Bernardello
Goalkeeper trainer: Luis Preti

=== Kits ===
Supplier: Puma
Sponsor(s): Banco Pichincha, Mazda, CNT, Discover, Pilsener, Salud SA

Home
Home
alternate 1
Away
Third

Third
alternate 1
Club Universitario 103 years
Club Universitario 103 years
alternate 1
Club Universitario 103 years (White)

Type	Shirt	Shorts	Socks	Additional information
Home	White	White	White	
Home alternate 1	White	Navy Blue	White	Worn on May 19 (vs Flamengo)
Away	Orange	Navy Blue	Navy Blue	Worn on April 17 (vs Guayaquil City), September 25 (vs Manta), October 2 (vs Guayaquil City), November 21 (vs Orense)
Third	Wine	Wine	Wine	Worn on May 13 (vs Vélez Sarsfield)
Third alternate 1	Wine	White	Wine	Worn on July 20 (vs Grêmio)
Club Universitario 103 years	Blue	White	Blue	Worn on July 16 (vs Técnico Universitario) and July 25 (vs 9 de Octubre)
Club Universitario 103 years alternate 1	Blue	White	White	Worn on August 15 (vs Deportivo Cuenca)
Club Universitario 103 years (White)	White	White	White	Worn on October 16 (vs Macará), October 23 (vs Independiente del Valle), October 31 (vs Aucas), November 7 (vs Delfín) and November 26 (vs Técnico Universitario)

== Squad information ==
Num	Pos	Nat.	Player	Age	Since	App	Goals	Notes
1	GK	ECU	José Cardenas	25	2021	0	0	
2	DF	ECU	Joel Ventura	20	2019	2	0	
3	DF	ECU	Edilson Cabeza	18	2020	1	0	
4	DF	ECU	Luis Caicedo	28	2019	23	0	
5	MF	ARG	Lucas Villarruel	30	2020	23	2	
6	DF	ECU	Luis Ayala	27	2019	33	0	
7	FW	PAR	Luis Amarilla	25	2021	0	0	
8	MF	ECU	Jordy Alcívar	21	2018	36	2	
9	FW	ARG	Juan Cruz Kaprof	25	2021	0	0	
10	MF	ECU	Jhojan Julio	22	2016	120	17	
11	MF	ECU	Billy Arce	22	2020	26	3	
12	GK	ECU	Lenin Ayoví	18	2021	0	0	
13	DF	ECU	Pedro Perlaza	29	2020	24	0	
14	DF	ECU	José Quintero	30	2015	183	13	
15	DF	ECU	Franklin Guerra	28	2018	93	4	
16	FW	ECU	Djorkaeff Reasco	21	2021	13	2	Previously with the club from '16–'19
18	MF	ARG	Lucas Piovi	29	2020	16	0	
19	MF	URU	Santiago Scotto	23	2021	0	0	
20	DF	ECU	Christian Cruz	28	2018	79	0	
21	DF	ECU	Andersson Ordóñez	26	2018	28	0	
22	GK	ARG; ECU	Adrián Gabbarini	35	2018	105	0	
24	DF	ECU	Moisés Corozo	28	2020	22	4	
25	DF	ECU	Daykol Romero	19	2021	0	0	
26	MF	ECU	Sebastián González	17	2021	0	0	
27	MF	ECU	Jefferson Troya	19	2020	1	0	
28	MF	ECU	Joseph Espinoza	20	2019	3	0	
29	MF	ECU	Adolfo Muñoz	23	2019	39	8	
30	FW	ECU	Kevin Mercado	25	2021	20	2	Previously with the club from '12–'14
31	MF	ECU	Jefferson Arce	20	2019	2	0	
32	MF	ECU	Nilson Angulo	17	2021	0	0	
33	MF	ECU	Jairón Charcopa	16	2021	0	0	
34	MF	ECU	Ariel Mina	17	2021	0	0	
38	DF	ECU	Maiky de la Cruz	16	2021	0	0	

Note: Caps and goals are of the national league and are current as of the beginning of the season.

=== Winter transfers ===
Players In
Name	Nat	Pos	Age	Moving from
Luis Amarilla	PAR	FW	25	Minnesota United (United States) (loan)
Juan Cruz Kaprof	ARG	FW	25	Lecco (Italy)
Djorkaeff Reasco	ECU	FW	21	Dorados de Sinaloa (Mexico) (loan return)

Players Out
Name	Nat	Pos	Age	Moving to
Leonel Nazareno	ECU	GK	26	Chacaritas FC (Ecuador) (loan)
Carlos Rodríguez	URU	DF	30	Peñarol (Uruguay) (loan)
Marcos Caicedo	ECU	MF	29	Guayaquil City (Ecuador) (loan)
Andrés Chicaiza	ECU	MF	28	Deportivo Cuenca (Ecuador) (loan)
Davinson Jama	ECU	MF	22	Universidad Católica (Ecuador)
Junior Sornoza	ECU	MF	26	Club Tijuana (Mexico)
Édison Vega	ECU	MF	30	Aucas (Ecuador)
Rodrigo Aguirre	URU	FW	26	Necaxa (Mexico) (loan)
Ronny Medina	ECU	FW	25	América de Quito (Ecuador) (loan return)

=== Summer transfers ===
Players In
Name	Nat	Pos	Age	Moving from
José Cardenas	ECU	GK	25	América de Quito (Ecuador)
Santiago Scotto	URU	MF	23	Montevideo City Torque (Uruguay)
Kevin Mercado	ECU	FW	25	Necaxa (Mexico) (loan)

Players Out
Name	Nat	Pos	Age	Moving to
Erik Viveros	ECU	GK	24	TBA
Matías Zunino	URU	MF	30	Nacional (Uruguay) (loan)
Cristian Martínez Borja	COL	FW	31	Junior (Colombia)

== Competitions ==
Competition	Started round	Final position / round	First match	Last match
LigaPro	First Stage	6th	February 19	November 26
CONMEBOL Libertadores	Group Stage	Group Stage	April 21	May 27
CONMEBOL Sudamericana	Round of 16	Quarter-finals	July 13	August 19
Supercopa Ecuador	Semi-finals	Champions	June 22	June 26

=== Pre-season friendlies ===
February 13 Noche Blanca	L.D.U. Quito	2 - 1	Macará	Quito
20:30 UTC−05:00	Julio 32'; Muñoz 69'		Mora 47'	Stadium: Estadio Rodrigo Paz Delgado; Referee: Álex Cajas

=== LigaPro ===
The 2021 season was Liga's 60th season in the Serie A and their 20th consecutive.

==== First stage ====
Results summary

Overall								Home						Away					
Pld	W	D	L	GF	GA	GD	Pts	W	D	L	GF	GA	GD	W	D	L	GF	GA	GD
15	6	7	2	22	19	+3	25	5	2	1	14	10	+4	1	5	1	8	9	−1

Results by round

Round	1	2	3	4	5	6	7	8	9	10	11	12	13	14	15
Ground	H	A	H	A	H	H	A	H	A	H	A	H	A	H	A
Result	W	D	W	D	D	D	D	W	D	W	L	L	D	W	W
Position	3	4	3	3	3	3	5	5	5	4	5	6	7	7	6

Updated to match(es) played on July 16. Source: Competitive matches
A = Away; H = Home; W = Win; D = Draw; L = Loss

February 19 Round 1	L.D.U. Quito	4 - 2	9 de Octubre	Quito
19:00 UTC−05:00	Muñoz 30', 33'; Guerra (yellow card) 45+1'; Martínez Borja 64'; Julio 88'	Report	Fajardo 55'; Da Luz 62'; Fernández (yellow card) 90'	Stadium: Estadio Rodrigo Paz Delgado; Referee: Guillermo Guerrero

February 28 Round 2	Olmedo	0 - 0	L.D.U. Quito	Riobamba
15:30 UTC−05:00	Quintero (yellow card) 13'; Andrade (yellow card) 34'; Ramírez (yellow card) 71'	Report	Alcívar (yellow card) 33'	Stadium: Estadio Olímpico de Riobamba; Referee: Juan Carlos Andrade

March 6 Round 3	L.D.U. Quito	2 - 1	Universidad Católica	Quito
17:30 UTC−05:00	Cruz 15'; Corozo (yellow card) 35'; Martínez Borja (yellow card) 37', (goal) 75' (pen.); Zunino (yellow card) 60'; Alcívar (yellow card) 62'; Arce (yellow card) 90+6'	Report	Cevallos (yellow card) 31'; Oña (yellow card) 40'; Farías (yellow card) 53'; Alzugaray 66' (pen.); Anangonó (yellow card) 85'	Stadium: Estadio Rodrigo Paz Delgado; Referee: Franklin Congo

March 12 Round 4	Deportivo Cuenca	2 - 2	L.D.U. Quito	Cuenca
19:00 UTC−05:00	Mancinelli 7' (pen.), (yellow card) 86'; Naula (yellow card) 70' (yellow-red card) 77', (goal) 76'	Report	Martínez Borja 69'; Kaprof 86'	Stadium: Estadio Alejandro Serrano Aguilar; Referee: Guillermo Guerrero

March 20 Round 5	L.D.U. Quito	2 - 2	Barcelona SC	Quito
18:30 UTC−05:00	Guerra (yellow card) 5'; Martínez Borja 20', 53'; Julio (yellow card) 36'; Perlaza (yellow card) 48'; Quintero (yellow card) 71'	Report	Martínez 45+1', (yellow card) 68'; Díaz 52' (pen.); Pineida (yellow card) 88'	Stadium: Estadio Rodrigo Paz Delgado; Referee: Luis Quiroz

April 3 Round 6	L.D.U. Quito	0 - 0	Mushuc Runa	Quito
14:30 UTC−05:00	Zunino (yellow card) 54'; Guerra (yellow card) 90+5'	Report	Romero (yellow card) 54'; Pabón (yellow card) 55'; Quilumba (yellow card) 87'	Stadium: Estadio Rodrigo Paz Delgado; Referee: Roberto Sánchez

April 10 Round 7	Emelec	1 - 1	L.D.U. Quito	Guayaquil
17:00 UTC−05:00	Rojas (yellow card) 62'; Cabeza 79'	Report	Piovi (yellow card) 15'; Alcívar 60'	Stadium: Estadio George Capwell; Referee: Diego Lara

April 14 Round 8	L.D.U. Quito	1 - 0	Manta	Quito
14:30 UTC−05:00	Julio (yellow card) 38'; Reasco 90+1', (yellow card) 90+2'	Report	Alaniz (yellow card) 53'; Mesías (yellow card) 72'; Piedra (yellow card) 90'	Stadium: Estadio Rodrigo Paz Delgado; Referee: Roddy Zambrano

April 17 Round 9	Guayaquil City	2 - 2	L.D.U. Quito	Guayaquil
20:00 UTC−05:00	Parrales 16' (pen.), 33'; Sambonino (yellow card) 45+2'; Ordóñez (yellow card) 89'	Report	Amarilla 37'; Arce (yellow card) 45'; Caicedo (yellow card) 49'; Corozo 68'; Perlaza (yellow card) 77'; Villarruel (yellow card) 88'; Alcívar (yellow card) 90+1'	Stadium: Estadio Christian Benítez Betancourt; Referee: Leandro Angulo

May 1 Round 10	L.D.U. Quito	2 - 1	Macará	Quito
18:00 UTC−05:00	Alcívar (yellow card) 3'; Muñoz 41'; Quintero (yellow card) 64'; Espinoza (yellow card) 69'; Arce (yellow card) 80'; Amarilla 90+2'	Report	Mora (yellow card) 7'; Garcés 73'	Stadium: Estadio Rodrigo Paz Delgado; Referee: René Marín

May 8 Round 11	Independiente del Valle	3 - 1	L.D.U. Quito	Quito
15:30 UTC−05:00	Faravelli 21' (pen.), 48'; Schunke 33'; Pellerano (yellow card) 50'; Hurtado (yellow card) 60'; Ortíz (yellow card) 87'; Landázuri (yellow card) 90+1'	Report	Amarilla 24'; Piovi (yellow card) 77'; Guerra (yellow card) 81'	Stadium: Estadio Banco Guayaquil; Referee: Roddy Zambrano

May 16 Round 12	L.D.U. Quito	1 - 3	Aucas	Quito
16:30 UTC−05:00	Viotti 13' (o.g.); Zunino (yellow card) 19'; Julio (yellow card) 29'; Piovi (yellow card) 45+2'; Ordóñez (yellow card) 46'; Quintero (yellow card) 60'; Gabbarini (yellow card) 64'	Report	Cuero (yellow card) 10', (goal) 32'; Fydriszewski 11', 43'; Frascarelli (yellow card) 59'; Quiñónez (yellow card) 71'	Stadium: Estadio Rodrigo Paz Delgado; Referee: Franklin Congo

May 23 Round 13	Delfín	1 - 1	L.D.U. Quito	Manta
16:30 UTC−05:00	Burbano (yellow card) 41', (goal) 45'	Report	Arce (yellow card) 36'; Amarilla 38' (pen.)	Stadium: Estadio Jocay; Referee: Luis Quiroz

May 30 Round 14	L.D.U. Quito	2 - 1	Orense	Quito
16:00 UTC−05:00	Muñoz 43'; Amarilla (yellow card) 44', (goal) 55'; Martínez Borja (yellow card) 89'	Report	Achilier (yellow card) 27'; Tello (yellow card) 50'; Caicedo 76'	Stadium: Estadio Rodrigo Paz Delgado; Referee: Jefferson Macías

July 16 Round 15	Técnico Universitario	0 - 1	L.D.U. Quito	Ambato
19:00 UTC−05:00	Caicedo (yellow card) 44'; Villa (yellow card) 62'; Guevara (yellow card) 84'	Report	Reasco 29'; Perlaza (yellow card) 50'; B. Arce (yellow card) 65'; J. Arce (yellow card) 90+2'	Stadium: Estadio Bellavista; Referee: Leandro Angulo

==== Second stage ====
Results summary

Overall								Home						Away					
Pld	W	D	L	GF	GA	GD	Pts	W	D	L	GF	GA	GD	W	D	L	GF	GA	GD
15	6	5	4	27	22	+5	23	4	2	1	15	9	+6	2	3	3	12	13	−1

Results by round

Round	1	2	3	4	5	6	7	8	9	10	11	12	13	14	15
Ground	A	H	A	H	A	A	H	A	H	A	H	A	H	A	H
Result	L	W	D	D	W	W	W	D	W	L	L	L	D	D	W
Position	15	7	7	7	7	5	3	3	2	4	5	6	6	6	5

Updated to match(es) played on October 16. Source: Competitive matches
A = Away; H = Home; W = Win; D = Draw; L = Loss

July 25 Round 1	9 de Octubre	4 - 1	L.D.U. Quito	Guayaquil
16:30 UTC−05:00	Fajardo 32', 57'; Mejía (yellow card) 36'; Cabezas 53', 80'	Report	Caicedo (yellow card) 51'; Cruz 84'	Stadium: Estadio Modelo Alberto Spencer Herrera; Referee: Carlos Orbe

August 2 Round 2	L.D.U. Quito	4 - 0	Olmedo	Quito
19:00 UTC−05:00	Amarilla 20', 64'; Guerra (yellow card) 30'; Cruz 68'; J. Arce 90+3'	Report	León (yellow card) 23'	Stadium: Estadio Rodrigo Paz Delgado; Referee: Álex Cajas

August 7 Round 3	Universidad Católica	2 - 2	L.D.U. Quito	Quito
17:30 UTC−05:00	Alzugaray 24', 41', (yellow card) 60' de los Santos (yellow card) 38'; Minda (red card) 73'; Anangonó (yellow card) 79'; Martínez (yellow card) 79'	Report	Caicedo (yellow card) 10' (yellow-red card) 42'; Muñoz (yellow card) 17'; Zunino 29'; Perlaza (yellow card) 81'; Reasco 90+1'; Cruz (yellow card) 90+5'	Stadium: Estadio Olímpico Atahualpa; Referee: Augusto Aragón

August 15 Round 4	L.D.U. Quito	3 - 3	Deportivo Cuenca	Quito
18:00 UTC−05:00	Quintero 13', 71', (yellow card) 48'; Reasco 16'; Corozo (yellow card) 44'; Perlaza (yellow card) 45'; Scotto (yellow card) 82' (yellow-red card) 83'; Muñoz (yellow card) 90'	Report	Peña (yellow card) 30'; Chicaiza 38' (pen.); Dorregaray 42'; Mera 66'; Bolaños (yellow card) 74'; Penilla (yellow card) 80'	Stadium: Estadio Rodrigo Paz Delgado; Referee: Guillermo Guerrero

August 23 Round 5	Barcelona SC	0 - 2	L.D.U. Quito	Guayaquil
19:00 UTC−05:00	Pineida (yellow card) 61'; Piñatares (yellow card) 83'; Mastriani (yellow card) 90+8'	Report	Zunino (yellow card) 9'; Caicedo (yellow card) 20'; Cruz (yellow card) 22'; Amarilla 29'; Piovi (yellow card) 30'; Gabbarini (yellow card) 57'; Mercado (yellow card) 61'; Reasco 90+3', (yellow card) 90+5'	Stadium: Estadio Monumental Banco Pichincha; Referee: Diego Lara

August 28 Round 6	Mushuc Runa	1 - 3	L.D.U. Quito	Ambato
20:00 UTC−05:00	Giordana 42' (pen.); Adé (yellow card) 59' (yellow-red card) 62'	Report	Quintero 6', 20'; Guerra (yellow card) 17'; Caicedo (yellow card) 22' (yellow-red card) 45+2'; Julio (yellow card) 43'; Piovi (yellow card) 60'; Cruz 66'; Gabbarini (yellow card) 76'	Stadium: Estadio Bellavista; Referee: Álex Cajas

September 19 Round 7	L.D.U. Quito	3 - 2	Emelec	Quito
19:00 UTC−05:00	Scotto 20'; Mercado 37'; Angulo (yellow card) 39'; Cruz (yellow card) 54'; Ordóñez 63' (pen.); Gabbarini (yellow card) 86'	Report	Ordóñez 3' (o.g.); Cevallos 31'; Rojas (yellow card) 39'; Sosa (yellow card) 53'; Caicedo (yellow card) 90'; Barceló (yellow card) 90+5'	Stadium: Estadio Rodrigo Paz Delgado; Referee: Roddy Zambrano

September 25 Round 8	Manta	2 - 2	L.D.U. Quito	Manta
20:00 UTC−05:00	Cuero (yellow card) 49'; Alaníz (yellow card) 58', (goal) 73'; Martínez (yellow card) 66', (goal) 87'; Corozo (yellow card) 68'	Report	Angulo 22', (yellow card) 33'; Gabbarini (yellow card) 65'; González 75'; Romero (yellow card) 85'; Troya (yellow card) 90+4'	Stadium: Estadio Jocay; Referee: Guillermo Guerrero

October 2 Round 9	L.D.U. Quito	3 - 1	Guayaquil City	Quito
20:00 UTC−05:00	Muñoz 8', 16'; Reasco 38'; Scotto (yellow card) 40'; González (yellow card) 64'	Report	Villalba 49'	Stadium: Estadio Rodrigo Paz Delgado; Referee: Luis Quiroz

October 16 Round 10	Macará	2 - 1	L.D.U. Quito	Ambato
20:00 UTC−05:00	Duffard (yellow card) 52'; Portocarrero 60'; Montaño 68'; Fernández (yellow card) 84'; Mora (yellow card) 90+4'	Report	Angulo (red card) 39'; Ordóñez (yellow card) 39'; Muñoz (yellow card) 45+2'; Quintero (yellow card) 51' (yellow-red card) 78'; Amarilla 76'; Cruz (yellow card) 77'	Stadium: Estadio Bellavista; Referee: René Marín

October 23 Round 11	L.D.U. Quito	0 - 2	Independiente del Valle	Quito
20:00 UTC−05:00	Piovi (yellow card) 4'; Perlaza (yellow card) 36'	Report	García 55'; Minda 58'	Stadium: Estadio Rodrigo Paz Delgado; Referee: Guillermo Guerrero

October 31 Round 12	Aucas	1 - 0	L.D.U. Quito	Quito
19:00 UTC−05:00	Figueroa 20'; Briones (yellow card) 60'; Mejía (yellow card) 90+2'	Report	Guerra (yellow card) 10'; Piovi (yellow card) 20'; Ayala (yellow card) 55'; Perlaza (yellow card) 70'	Stadium: Estadio Gonzalo Pozo Ripalda; Referee: Roddy Zambrano

November 7 Round 13	L.D.U. Quito	1 - 1	Delfín	Quito
16:30 UTC−05:00	Reasco 60' (pen.)	Report	Luzarraga (yellow card) 47'; Piris 75'	Stadium: Estadio Rodrigo Paz Delgado; Referee: Jaime Sánchez

November 21 Round 14	Orense	1 - 1	L.D.U. Quito	Machala
15:30 UTC−05:00	Montaño 65'; Uchuari (yellow card) 75'; Assis (yellow card) 76'; Quiñónez (yellow card) 90+1'	Report	Caicedo (yellow card) 29'; Guerra (yellow card) 36'; Julio 57'	Stadium: Estadio 9 de Mayo; Referee: Luis Quiroz

November 26 Round 15	L.D.U. Quito	1 - 0	Técnico Universitario	Quito
19:00 UTC−05:00	Cruz (yellow card) 35'; Scotto (yellow card) 45'; Muñoz 75'	Report	Patta (yellow card) 9'; Rivas (yellow card) 37'; Rangel (red card) 90+2'	Stadium: Estadio Rodrigo Paz Delgado; Referee: Bryan Loayza

=== CONMEBOL Libertadores ===
L.D.U. Quito qualified to the 2021 CONMEBOL Libertadores—their 19th participation in the continental tournament—as Runner-up of the 2020 LigaPro. They entered the competition in the group stage.

==== CONMEBOL Libertadores squad ====
No.	Pos.	Nation	Player
1	GK	ECU	Gender Villarreal
2	DF	ECU	Frank Ventura
3	DF	ECU	Edilson Cabeza
4	DF	ECU	Luis Caicedo
5	MF	ARG	Lucas Villarruel
6	DF	ECU	Luis Ayala
7	FW	PAR	Luis Amarilla
8	MF	ECU	Jordy Alcívar
9	FW	ARG	Juan Cruz Kaprof
10	MF	ECU	Jhojan Julio
11	MF	ECU	Billy Arce
12	GK	ECU	Erik Viveros
13	DF	ECU	Pedro Perlaza
14	DF	ECU	José Quintero
15	DF	ECU	Franklin Guerra
16	FW	ECU	Djorkaeff Reasco

No.	Pos.	Nation	Player
17	MF	ECU	Stalin Valencia
18	MF	ARG	Lucas Piovi
19	FW	COL	Cristian Martínez Borja
20	DF	ECU	Christian Cruz
21	DF	ECU	Andersson Ordóñez
22	GK	ARG	Adrián Gabbarini (captain)
23	MF	URU	Matías Zunino
24	DF	ECU	Moisés Corozo
25	MF	ECU	Maiky De La Cruz
26	MF	ECU	Sebastián González
27	MF	ECU	Jefferson Troya
28	MF	ECU	Joseph Espinoza
29	MF	ECU	Adolfo Muñoz
32	MF	ECU	Nilson Angulo
33	FW	ECU	Jairón Charcopa
35	GK	ECU	Lenin Ayoví

Overall								Home						Away					
Pld	W	D	L	GF	GA	GD	Pts	W	D	L	GF	GA	GD	W	D	L	GF	GA	GD
6	2	2	2	15	13	+2	8	2	0	1	10	6	+4	0	2	1	5	7	−2

==== Group stage ====
Pos	Team	Pld	W	D	L	GF	GA	GD	Pts	Qualification
1	(Brazil) Flamengo	6	3	3	0	14	9	+5	12	Round of 16
2	(Argentina) Vélez Sarsfield	6	3	1	2	10	8	+2	10	Round of 16
3	(Ecuador) LDU Quito	6	2	2	2	15	13	+2	8	Copa Sudamericana
4	(Chile) Unión La Calera	6	0	2	4	8	17	−9	2	

Source: CONMEBOL
Rules for classification: 1) Points; 2) Goal difference; 3) Goals scored; 4) Away goals scored; 5) CONMEBOL ranking.

April 21 Group Stage	Unión La Calera (Chile)	2 - 2	(Ecuador) L.D.U. Quito	La Calera, Chile
22:00 UTC−04:00	Vilches 18', 70'; Castellani (yellow card) 37'	Report	Zunino (yellow card) 43'; Arce 51', 83'; Quintero (yellow card) 89'	Stadium: Estadio Municipal Nicolás Chahuán Nazar; Referee: Gery Vargas (Bolivia)

April 27 Group Stage	L.D.U. Quito (Ecuador)	3 - 1	(Argentina) Vélez Sarsfield	Quito, Ecuador
17:15 UTC−05:00	Guerra (yellow card) 18'; Martínez Borja 28', 53'; Arce (yellow card) 34'; Caicedo (yellow card) 49'; Kaprof (yellow card) 59'; Zunino 65'; Ayala (yellow card) 90+1'	Report	Galdames 42'; Cáseres (yellow card) 63'; Monzón (yellow card) 90+1'	Stadium: Estadio Rodrigo Paz Delgado; Referee: Diego Haro (Peru)

May 4 Group Stage	L.D.U. Quito (Ecuador)	2 - 3	(Brazil) Flamengo	Quito, Ecuador
19:30 UTC−05:00	Caicedo (yellow card) 27'; Corozo (yellow card) 28'; Alcívar (yellow card) 36'; Martínez Borja 50'; Amarilla 61'; Piovi (yellow card) 70'; Espinoza (yellow card) 75'	Report	Gabriel Barbosa 3', 85' (pen.), (yellow card) 86'; Bruno Henrique 30'; Diego (yellow card) 68'; Hugo Souza (yellow card) 68'	Stadium: Estadio Rodrigo Paz Delgado; Referee: Esteban Ostojich (Uruguay)

May 13 Group Stage	Vélez Sarsfield (Argentina)	3 - 1	(Ecuador) L.D.U. Quito	Buenos Aires, Argentina
19:00 UTC−03:00	Almada 45'; Janson 69'; Galdames (yellow card) 70'; Lucero (yellow card) 72'; Mancuello 90+3'	Report	Julio (yellow card) 24'; Alcívar (yellow card) 76'; Zunino 78'; Piovi (red card) 87'	Stadium: José Amalfitani Stadium; Referee: Andrés Matonte (Uruguay)

May 19 Group Stage	Flamengo (Brazil)	2 - 2	(Ecuador) L.D.U. Quito	Rio de Janeiro, Brazil
21:00 UTC−03:00	Willian Arão (red card) 15'; Pedro 32'; Gerson (yellow card) 53'; Bruno Henrique (yellow card) 71'; Gustavo Henrique 88'	Report	Cruz (yellow card) 18'; Guerra 35'; Julio 60'; Quintero (yellow card) 79'	Stadium: Maracanã Stadium; Referee: Alexis Herrera (Venezuela)

May 27 Group Stage	L.D.U. Quito (Ecuador)	5 - 2	(Chile) Unión La Calera	Quito, Ecuador
19:00 UTC−05:00	Fernández 15' (o.g.); Amarilla 28', 33'; Arce 58', 60'	Report	Sáez 54', 90+2'	Stadium: Estadio Rodrigo Paz Delgado; Referee: Carlos Betancur (Colombia)

=== CONMEBOL Sudamericana ===
L.D.U. Quito qualified to the 2021 CONMEBOL Sudamericana—their 12th participation in the continental tournament—as third place in the Group G of the CONMEBOL Libertadores. They entered the competition in the Round of 16.

==== CONMEBOL Sudamericana squad ====
No.	Pos.	Nation	Player
1	GK	ECU	José Cárdenas
2	DF	ECU	Frank Ventura
3	DF	ECU	Edilson Cabeza
4	DF	ECU	Luis Caicedo
5	MF	ARG	Lucas Villarruel
6	DF	ECU	Luis Ayala
7	FW	PAR	Luis Amarilla
8	MF	ECU	Jordy Alcívar
9	FW	ARG	Juan Cruz Kaprof
10	MF	ECU	Jhojan Julio
11	MF	ECU	Billy Arce
12	GK	ECU	Lenin Ayoví
13	DF	ECU	Pedro Perlaza
14	DF	ECU	José Quintero
15	DF	ECU	Franklin Guerra
16	FW	ECU	Djorkaeff Reasco
17	MF	ECU	Stalin Valencia
18	MF	ARG	Lucas Piovi
20	DF	ECU	Christian Cruz

No.	Pos.	Nation	Player
21	DF	ECU	Andersson Ordóñez
22	GK	ARG	Adrián Gabbarini (captain)
23	MF	URU	Matías Zunino
24	DF	ECU	Moisés Corozo
25	MF	ECU	Daykol Romero
26	MF	ECU	Sebastián González
27	MF	ECU	Jefferson Troya
28	MF	ECU	Joseph Espinoza
29	MF	ECU	Adolfo Muñoz
30	FW	ECU	Kevin Mercado
31	MF	ECU	Jefferson Arce
32	MF	ECU	Nilson Angulo
33	FW	ECU	Jairón Charcopa
34	DF	ECU	Madison Mina
35	GK	ECU	Ethan Minda
36	DF	ECU	Bryan Lastra
37	MF	URU	Santiago Scotto
38	MF	ECU	Maiky de la Cruz

Overall								Home						Away					
Pld	W	D	L	GF	GA	GD	Pts	W	D	L	GF	GA	GD	W	D	L	GF	GA	GD
4	2	0	2	5	6	−1	6	1	0	1	1	1	0	1	0	1	4	5	−1

==== Round Of 16 ====
July 13 Round of 16	L.D.U. Quito (Ecuador)	0 - 1	(Brazil) Grêmio	Quito, Ecuador
17:15 UTC−05:00	Piovi (yellow card) 21'; Guerra (yellow card) 87'	Report	Léo Pereira 19'; Alisson (yellow card) 35'; Fernando Henrique (yellow card) 49'	Stadium: Estadio Rodrigo Paz Delgado; Referee: Cristian Garay (Chile)

July 20 Round of 16	Grêmio (Brazil)	1 - 2	(Ecuador) L.D.U. Quito	Porto Alegre, Brazil
19:15 UTC−03:00	Léo Pereira (yellow card) 21'; Diego Souza 24'; Kannemann (yellow card) 80'	Report	Alcívar 44', 56' (pen.); Zunino (yellow card) 72'	Stadium: Arena do Grêmio; Referee: José Argote (Venezuela)

==== Quarter-finals ====
August 12 Quarter-finals	L.D.U. Quito (Ecuador)	1 - 0	(Brazil) Athletico Paranaense	Quito, Ecuador
17:15 UTC−05:00	Angulo (yellow card) 39'; Reasco 87'	Report	Marcinho (yellow card) 33'; Christian (yellow card) 62'; Fernando Canesin (yellow card) 90+3'	Stadium: Estadio Rodrigo Paz Delgado; Referee: Andrés Matonte (Uruguay)

August 19 Quarter-finals	Athletico Paranaense (Brazil)	4 - 2	(Ecuador) L.D.U. Quito	Curitiba, Brazil
19:15 UTC−03:00	Christian 26', 30'; Guilherme Bissoli (yellow card) 47', (goal) 62', 69' (pen.); Erick (yellow card) 84'	Report	Amarilla 11'; Julio 43'; Cruz (yellow card) 56'; Scotto (yellow card) 68'; Caicedo (yellow card) 71'	Stadium: Arena da Baixada; Referee: Eber Aquino (Paraguay)

=== Supercopa Ecuador ===
==== Semi-finals ====
June 22 Semi-finals	L.D.U. Quito	4 - 2	Delfín	Quito
17:00 UTC−05:00	Arce 2', 64'; Ordóñez (yellow card) 60'; Amarilla 72', 90+4'; Gabbarini (yellow card) 88'	Report	Rojas (yellow card) 31'; Burbano 82'; Piris 90'	Stadium: Estadio Olímpico Atahualpa; Referee: Álex Cajas

==== Final ====
June 26 Final	Barcelona SC	0 - 1	L.D.U. Quito	Quito
15:00 UTC−05:00	Molina (yellow card) 40'; Piñatares (yellow card) 44'; Preciado (yellow card) 85'; Garcés (yellow card) 90'		B. Caicedo 4' (o.g.); Caicedo (yellow card) 6'; Piovi (yellow card) 57'; Julio (yellow card) 88'	Stadium: Estadio Banco Guayaquil; Referee: Roberto Sánchez

== Player statistics ==
Num	Pos	Player	App	Goal	Yellow card	Red card	App	Goal	Yellow card	Red card	App	Goal	Yellow card	Red card	App	Goal	Yellow card	Red card	App	Goal	Yellow card	Red card
Num	Pos	Player	LigaPro				CONMEBOL Libertadores				CONMEBOL Sudamericana				Supercopa Ecuador				Total			
1	GK	José Cardenas	4	—	—	—	—	—	—	—	—	—	—	—	—	—	—	—	4	—	—	—
2	DF	Joel Ventura	—	—	—	—	1	—	—	—	—	—	—	—	—	—	—	—	1	—	—	—
3	DF	Edilson Cabeza	—	—	—	—	—	—	—	—	—	—	—	—	—	—	—	—	—	—	—	—
4	DF	Luis Caicedo	16	—	4	2	2	—	2	—	4	—	1	—	2	—	1	—	24	—	8	2
5	MF	Lucas Villarruel	14	—	1	—	3	—	—	—	1	—	—	—	2	—	—	—	20	—	1	—
6	DF	Luis Ayala	15	—	1	—	6	—	1	—	2	—	—	—	1	—	—	—	24	—	2	—
7	FW	Luis Amarilla	19	9	1	—	6	3	—	—	4	1	—	—	2	2	—	—	31	15	1	—
8	MF	Jordy Alcívar	28	1	4	—	6	—	2	—	4	2	—	—	2	—	—	—	40	3	6	—
9	FW	Juan Cruz Kaprof	11	1	—	—	—	—	1	—	3	—	—	—	—	—	—	—	14	1	1	—
10	MF	Jhojan Julio	24	2	4	—	3	1	1	—	4	1	—	—	2	—	1	—	33	4	6	—
11	MF	Billy Arce	21	—	5	—	6	4	1	—	1	—	—	—	2	2	—	—	30	6	6	—
12	GK	Lenin Ayoví	—	—	—	—	—	—	—	—	—	—	—	—	—	—	—	—	—	—	—	—
13	DF	Pedro Perlaza	23	—	7	—	4	—	—	—	4	—	—	—	—	—	—	—	31	—	7	—
14	DF	José Quintero	21	4	4	1	6	—	2	—	3	—	—	—	2	—	—	—	32	4	6	1
15	DF	Franklin Guerra	24	—	8	—	5	1	1	—	4	—	1	—	—	—	—	—	33	1	10	—
16	FW	Djorkaeff Reasco	19	7	2	—	1	—	—	—	3	1	—	—	1	—	—	—	24	8	2	—
18	MF	Lucas Piovi	25	—	7	—	4	—	1	1	4	—	1	—	2	—	1	—	35	—	10	1
19	MF	Santiago Scotto	10	1	2	1	—	—	—	—	2	—	1	—	—	—	—	—	12	1	3	1
20	DF	Christian Cruz	26	4	5	—	5	—	1	—	3	—	1	—	2	—	—	—	36	4	7	—
21	DF	Andersson Ordóñez	10	1	2	—	5	—	—	—	—	—	—	—	2	—	1	—	17	1	3	—
22	GK	Adrián Gabbarini	24	—	5	—	6	—	—	—	4	—	—	—	2	—	1	—	36	—	6	—
24	DF	Moisés Corozo	17	1	2	—	4	—	1	—	—	—	—	—	1	—	—	—	22	1	3	—
25	DF	Daykol Romero	6	—	1	—	—	—	—	—	—	—	—	—	—	—	—	—	6	—	1	—
26	MF	Sebastián González	9	1	1	—	—	—	—	—	—	—	—	—	2	—	1	—	11	1	2	—
27	MF	Jefferson Troya	5	—	1	—	—	—	—	—	—	—	—	—	—	—	—	—	5	—	1	—
28	MF	Joseph Espinoza	5	—	1	—	4	—	1	—	—	—	—	—	1	—	—	—	10	—	2	—
29	MF	Adolfo Muñoz	24	7	3	—	5	—	—	—	2	—	—	—	1	—	—	—	32	7	3	—
30	FW	Kevin Mercado	4	1	1	—	—	—	—	—	3	—	—	—	—	—	—	—	7	1	1	—
31	MF	Jefferson Arce	10	1	1	—	—	—	—	—	1	—	—	—	—	—	—	—	11	1	1	—
32	MF	Nilson Angulo	11	1	2	1	—	—	—	—	1	—	1	—	1	—	—	—	13	1	3	1
33	MF	Jairón Charcopa	1	—	—	—	—	—	—	—	—	—	—	—	—	—	—	—	1	—	—	—
34	MF	Ariel Mina	2	—	—	—	—	—	—	—	—	—	—	—	—	—	—	—	2	—	—	—
38	DF	Maiky de la Cruz	1	—	—	—	—	—	—	—	—	—	—	—	—	—	—	—	1	—	—	—
12	GK	Erik Viveros	4	—	—	—	—	—	—	—	—	—	—	—	—	—	—	—	4	—	—	—
19	FW	Cristian Martínez Borja	13	5	2	—	6	3	—	—	—	—	—	—	—	—	—	—	19	9	2	—
23	MF	Matías Zunino	17	1	4	—	6	2	1	—	4	—	1	—	2	—	—	—	29	3	6	—
Totals			—	48	81	5	—	14	16	1	—	5	7	0	—	4	6	0	—	68	100	6

As of November 26, 2021

Note: Players in italics left the club mid-season.

== Team statistics ==
	Total	Home	Away	Neutral
Total Games played	42	20	20	2
Total Games won	18	12	4	2
Total Games drawn	14	4	10	
Total Games lost	10	4	6	
Games played (LigaPro)	30	15	15	
Games won (LigaPro)	12	9	3	
Games drawn (LigaPro)	12	4	8	
Games lost (LigaPro)	6	2	4	
Games played (CONMEBOL Libertadores)	6	3	3	
Games won (CONMEBOL Libertadores)	2	2		
Games drawn (CONMEBOL Libertadores)	2		2	
Games lost (CONMEBOL Libertadores)	2	1	1	
Games played (CONMEBOL Sudamericana)	4	2	2	
Games won (CONMEBOL Sudamericana)	2	1	1	
Games drawn (CONMEBOL Sudamericana)				
Games lost (CONMEBOL Sudamericana)	2	1	1	
Games played (Supercopa Ecuador)	2			2
Games won (Supercopa Ecuador)	2			2
Games drawn (Supercopa Ecuador)				
Games lost (Supercopa Ecuador)				
Biggest win (LigaPro)	4 - 0 vs Olmedo	4 - 0 vs Olmedo	2 - 0 vs Barcelona SC; 3 - 1 vs Mushuc Runa	
Biggest loss (LigaPro)	1 - 4 vs 9 de Octubre	1 - 3 vs Aucas; 0 - 2 vs Independiente del Valle	1 - 4 vs 9 de Octubre	
Biggest win (CONMEBOL Libertadores)	5 - 2 vs Unión La Calera	5 - 2 vs Unión La Calera		
Biggest loss (CONMEBOL Libertadores)	1 - 3 vs Vélez Sarsfield	2 - 3 vs Flamengo	1 - 3 vs Vélez Sarsfield	
Biggest win (CONMEBOL Sudamericana)	2 - 1 vs Grêmio; 1 - 0 vs Athletico Paranaense	1 - 0 vs Athletico Paranaense	2 - 1 vs Grêmio	
Biggest loss (CONMEBOL Sudamericana)	2 - 4 vs Athletico Paranaense	0 - 1 vs Grêmio	2 - 4 vs Athletico Paranaense	
Biggest win (Supercopa Ecuador)	4 - 2 vs Delfín			4 - 2 vs Delfín
Biggest loss (Supercopa Ecuador)				
Clean sheets	9	5	3	1
Goals scored	74	40	29	5
Goals conceded	62	26	34	2
Goal difference	+12	+14	-5	+3
Average GF per game	1.76	2	1.45	2.5
Average GA per game	1.48	1.3	1.7	1
Yellow cards	110	53	51	6
Red cards	6	1	5	
Most appearances	Jordy Alcívar (40)	Jordy Alcívar (19)	Jordy Alcívar (19)	Jordy Alcívar (2); Luis Amarilla (2); Billy Arce (2); Luis Caicedo (2); Christian Cruz (2); Adrián Gabbarini (2); Sebastián González (2); Jhojan Julio (2); Andersson Ordóñez (2); Lucas Piovi (2); José Quintero (2); Lucas Villarruel (2); Matías Zunino (2)
Most minutes played	Adrián Gabbarini (3161)	Adrián Gabbarini (1530)	Franklin Guerra (1454)	Luis Amarilla (180); Luis Caicedo (180); Adrián Gabbarini (180); Andersson Ordóñez (180); José Quintero (180)
Top scorer	Luis Amarilla (15)	Luis Amarilla (7); Cristian Martínez Borja (7); Adolfo Muñoz (7)	Luis Amarilla (6)	Billy Arce (2); Luis Amarilla (2)
Worst discipline	Luis Caicedo (2) (red card)	Santiago Scotto (1) (red card)	Luis Caicedo (2) (red card)	Luis Caicedo (1) (yellow card); Adrián Gabbarini (1) (yellow card); Sebastián González (1) (yellow card); Jhojan Julio (1) (yellow card); Andersson Ordóñez (1) (yellow card); Lucas Piovi (1) (yellow card)
Penalties for	5/7 (71.43%)	3/4 (75%)	2/3 (66.67%)	
Penalties against	9/10 (90%)	4/4 (100%)	5/6 (83.33%)	
League Points	48/90 (53.33%)	31/45 (68.89%)	17/45 (37.78%)	
Winning rate	42.86%	60%	20%	100%

As of November 26, 2021
Source: See Competitive matches (above)
