= 2021 Supercopa Ecuador final =

2021 Supercopa Ecuador Final
Barcelona S.C.	LDU Quito
0	1
- Date: 26 June 2021
- Venue: Estadio Banco Guayaquil, Sangolquí
- Referee: Roberto Sánchez

The 2021 Supercopa Ecuador final, known as the 2021 Supercopa Ecuador, was the final of the 2nd edition of the Supercopa Ecuador. Compared to the 2020 Supercopa Ecuador the second edition was a small tournament consisting of six clubs instead of the usual two. The final was disputed between LDU Quito who played their second final and were the defending champions of the tournament, and Barcelona S.C. who played their first ever Supercopa Ecuador final.

In the final LDU Quito beat Barcelona S.C. 1-0 after 90 minutes due to the result of an own goal by Bryan Caicedo in the 4th minute of the game.

== Teams ==
Unlike the previous season's Supercopa Ecuador the format of the competition consisted of 6 clubs, 4 of which played a preliminary round, those being 9 de Octubre, Emelec, Delfín and Independiente del Valle. After that the two clubs who advanced faced off against LDU Quito and Barcelona S.C.

The two clubs who played in the final of the 2021 Supercopa were.

Team	Previous appearances (bold indicates winners)
LDU Quito	1 **(2020)**
Barcelona S.C.	none

== Details ==
26 June 2021
15:00 UTC−5

Barcelona S.C.	0–1	LDU Quito
	Report	B. Caicedo 4' (o.g.)

Estadio Banco Guayaquil, Sangolquí
Attendance: no spectators.
Referee: Roberto Sánchez

**Barcelona SC**	**LDU Quito**

GK	1	(Argentina) Javier Burrai (c)
RB	28	(Ecuador) Jean Carlos Montaño	(substituted off) 46'
CB	29	(Ecuador) Joshue Quiñónez
CB	4	(Ecuador) Bryan Caicedo
LB	6	(Ecuador) Leonel Quiñónez
CM	20	(Uruguay) Bruno Piñatares	(yellow card) 44'	(substituted off) 70'
CM	19	(Ecuador) Nixon Molina	(yellow card) 40'	(substituted off) 67'
RM	26	(Ecuador) Byron Castillo
CM	8	(Argentina) Leandro Martínez	(substituted off) 70'
LM	15	(Ecuador) Jonathan Perlaza	(substituted off) 46'
CF	11	(Ecuador) Carlos Garcés	(yellow card) 90'
Substitutes:
MF	13	(Ecuador) Gabriel Cortez	(substituted on) 46'
FW	77	(Ecuador) Adonis Preciado	(substituted on) 46'	(yellow card) 84'
FW	9	(Uruguay) Gonzalo Mastriani	(substituted on) 67'
MF	18	(Ecuador) Matías Oyola	(substituted on) 70'
MF	27	(Ecuador) Michael Carcelén	(substituted on) 70'
Manager:
(Argentina) Fabián Bustos

GK	22	(Argentina) Adrián Gabbarini (c)
RB	14	(Ecuador) José Quintero
CB	4	(Ecuador) Luis Caicedo	(yellow card) 5'
CB	21	(Ecuador) Anderson Ordóñez
LB	20	(Ecuador) Christian Cruz
RM	23	(Uruguay) Matías Zunino	(substituted off) 72'
CM	18	(Argentina) Lucas Piovi	(substituted off) 90+3'	(yellow card) 57'
LM	8	(Ecuador) Jordy Alcívar	(substituted off) 72'
RW	10	(Ecuador) Jhojan Julio	(substituted off) 90+3'	(yellow card) 88'
CF	7	(Paraguay) Luis Amarilla
LW	11	(Ecuador) Billy Arce	(substituted off) 87'
Substitutes:
MF	26	(Ecuador) Sebastián González B.	(substituted on) 72'	(yellow card) 85'
DF	5	(Argentina) Lucas Villarruel	(substituted on) 72'
DF	29	(Ecuador) Adolfo Muñoz	(substituted on) 87'
FW	16	(Ecuador) Djorkaeff Reasco	(substituted on) 90+3'
DF	24	(Ecuador) Moisés Corozo	(substituted on) 90+3'
Manager:
(Argentina) Gabriel Di Noia

Assistant referees:
Wilson Arévalo
Carlos Vera
Fourth official:
Gorky Araujo
Referee Advisor:
José Alvarado

**Match rules**

- 90 minutes.
- Penalty shoot-out if scores still level.
- Maximum of five substitutions.
