= Gabriel Di Noia =

Argentine football manager and former player

Personal information
- Date of birth: 8 March 1982 (age 44)
- Place of birth: Buenos Aires, Argentina
- Position: Forward

Team information
- Current team: Deportivo Maldonado (manager)

Senior career*
Years	Team	Apps	(Gls)
1998–2001	Sacachispas	12	(1)
2002–2003	Sportivo Barracas	10	(0)
Total		22	(1)

Managerial career
- 2015: Argentinos Juniors (youth)
- 2016: San Lorenzo (assistant)
- 2017: Independiente Rivadavia (assistant)
- 2018: Armenia U17
- 2019: Defensa y Justicia (youth)
- 2020–2021: LDU Quito (reserves)
- 2021: LDU Quito (caretaker)
- 2022: Barracas Central (assistant)
- 2023: Tristán Suárez
- 2024: Sud América
- 2025–: Deportivo Maldonado
- * Club domestic league appearances and goals

Gabriel Di Noia (born 8 March 1982) is an Argentine professional football manager and former player who played as a forward. He is the current manager of Uruguayan club Deportivo Maldonado.

== Career ==
Born in Buenos Aires, Di Noia played for Sacachispas and Sportivo Barracas before retiring, and subsequently worked at media outlets in Argentina and Colombia. He began his coaching career in 2015, after being a member of Fernando Batista's staff in the youth categories of Argentinos Juniors.

In the following two years, Di Noia was an assistant of Hugo Tocalli at San Lorenzo, and Pablo de Muner at Independiente Rivadavia, before reuniting with Batista in 2018, as a manager of the Armenia national under-17 team. He later worked at Defensa y Justicia's youth sides, before moving to Ecuador in January 2020 to work as LDU Quito's reserve team manager.

On 16 June 2021, Di Noia was named interim manager of LDU, after Pablo Repetto left. He led the side in the 2021 Supercopa Ecuador final, defeating Barcelona SC 1–0 in the final.

Back to his previous role after the arrival of Pablo Marini, Di Noia worked as an assistant of Alfredo Berti at Barracas Central in 2022, before being appointed manager of Tristán Suárez on 6 March 2023. On 24 July, however, he was sacked.

In April 2024, Di Noia moved to Uruguay after being named at the helm of Sud América. He left after suffering relegation, and was appointed Deportivo Maldonado manager on 10 September 2025.

== Honours ==
LDU Quito

- Supercopa Ecuador: 2021
