= Jhojan Julio =

Ecuadorian footballer (born 1998)

Personal information
- Full name: Jhojan Esmaides Julio Palacios
- Date of birth: 11 February 1998 (age 28)
- Place of birth: Quito, Ecuador
- Height: 1.67 m (5 ft 6 in)
- Positions: Attacking midfielder; winger

Team information
- Current team: Atlante (on loan from Tijuana)
- Number: 7

Youth career
- 2010–2016: LDU Quito

Senior career*
Years	Team	Apps	(Gls)
2016–2024	LDU Quito	183	(23)
2022	→ Santos (loan)	14	(0)
2025–	Tijuana	8	(1)
2025–2026	→ Querétaro (loan)	28	(4)
2026–	→ Atlante (loan)	10	(2)

International career^{‡}
2019–	Ecuador	9	(0)
- * Club domestic league appearances and goals as of 26 September 2026 ‡ National team caps and goals as of 22 November 2023

Jhojan Esmaides Julio Palacios (born 11 February 1998) is an Ecuadorian footballer who plays for Liga MX club Atlante. Mainly an attacking midfielder, he can also play as a winger.

== Club career ==
=== LDU Quito ===
Born in Quito, Julio joined L.D.U. Quito's youth setup in September 2010, aged 12. After impressing with the under-18 squad, he made his first team – and Serie A – debut on 25 June 2016, starting in a 0–0 away draw against Universidad Católica del Ecuador.

Julio scored his first senior goals on 22 October 2017, netting a brace in a 5–2 home success over Delfín. He established himself as a regular starter from the 2018 season onwards, and renewed his contract until 2022 on 4 April of that year.

On 14 September 2020, Julio further extended his contract with LDU until 2024. In September 2021, he was suspended for two months after an altercation with Emelec players during a match between both clubs, but the ban was later reduced to two matches on 1 October.

==== Loan to Santos ====
On 30 March 2022, LDU announced the transfer of Julio to Brazilian club Santos on a 14-month loan deal, with a buyout clause. Santos officially announced the move the following day.

Julio made his debut for Peixe on 9 April 2022, starting in a 0–0 away draw against Fluminense. On 17 December, Santos announced that his loan was cut short.

== International career ==
On 12 March 2019, Julio was called up by manager Jorge Célico to the Ecuador national team for friendlies against United States and Honduras. He made his full international debut nine days later, coming on as a second-half substitute for Renato Ibarra in a 0–1 loss against the former at the Exploria Stadium in Orlando, Florida.

In December 2019, Julio was called up to the under-23 team for the 2020 CONMEBOL Pre-Olympic Tournament, but had to withdraw due to an injury.

== Personal life ==
Julio's half-brothers Anderson and Madison are also footballers. Both play wingers.

== Career statistics ==
=== Club ===
As of 8 May 2024

Club	Season	League			Cup		International		Other		Total	
Club	Season	Division	Apps	Goals	Apps	Goals	Apps	Goals	Apps	Goals	Apps	Goals
LDU Quito	2016	Serie A	8	0	—		—		—		8	0
LDU Quito	2017	Serie A	22	3	—		0	0	2 (Note: Appearance(s) in Copa Sudamericana play-off)	0	24	3
LDU Quito	2018	Serie A	44	6	—		6 (Note: Appearance(s) in Copa Sudamericana)	1	—		50	7
LDU Quito	2019	Serie A	25	5	1	0	6 (Note: Appearance(s) in Copa Libertadores)	2	—		32	7
LDU Quito	2020	Serie A	21	3	—		6	3	0	0	27	6
LDU Quito	2021	Serie A	24	2	—		7 (Note: Three appearances and one goal in Copa Libertadores, four appearances and one goal in Copa Sudamericana)	2	2 (Note: Appearance(s) in Supercopa Ecuador)	0	33	4
LDU Quito	2022	Serie A	5	0	—		1	0	0	0	6	0
LDU Quito	2023	Serie A	27	4	—		12	3	0	0	39	7
LDU Quito	2024	Serie A	7	0	—		4	0	2 (Note: Appearance(s) in Recopa Sudamericana)	0	13	0
LDU Quito	Total		183	23	1	0	42	11	6	0	232	34
Santos (loan)	2022	Série A	14	0	3	0	4	1	—		21	1
Career total			197	23	4	0	46	12	6	0	253	35

=== International ===
As of 22 November 2023

Ecuador
Year	Apps	Goals
2019	3	0
2020	1	0
2021	1	0
2023	4	0
Total	9	0

== Honours ==
LDU Quito

- Ecuadorian Serie A: 2018, 2023
- Copa Sudamericana: 2023
- Copa Ecuador: 2019
- Supercopa Ecuador: 2020, 2021
