= José Quintero (footballer) =

Ecuadorian footballer

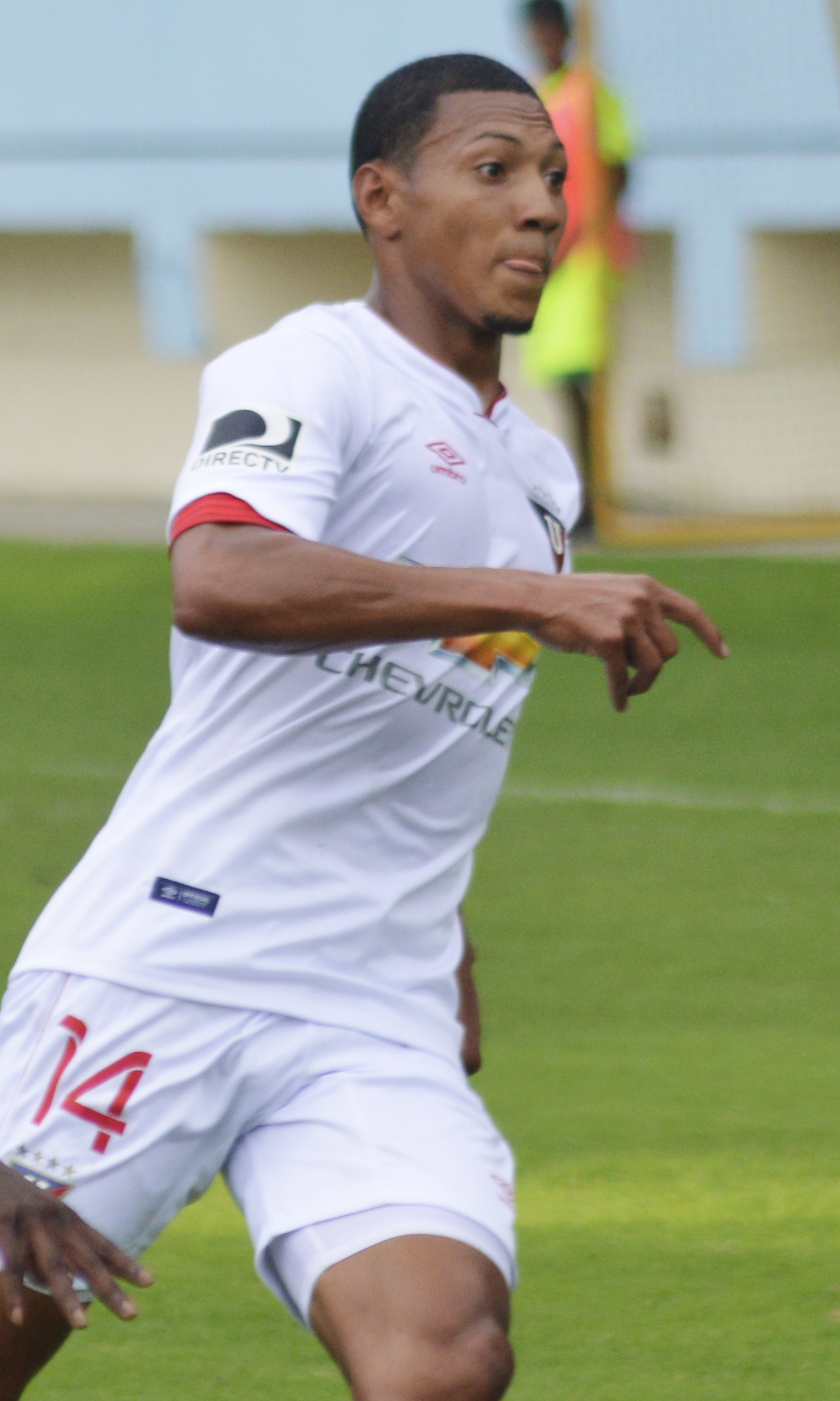
- Quintero with L.D.U. Quito in 2016

Personal information
- Full name: José Alfredo Quintero Ordóñez
- Date of birth: 20 June 1990 (age 36)
- Place of birth: Quinindé, Ecuador
- Height: 1.75 m (5 ft 9 in)
- Positions: Right back; midfielder

Team information
- Current team: LDU Quito
- Number: 14

Senior career*
Years	Team	Apps	(Gls)
2008–2012	Cuniburo	108	(14)
2013–2014	Aucas	68	(10)
2015–	LDU Quito	285	(25)

International career^{‡}
2017–2019	Ecuador	4	(0)
- * Club domestic league appearances and goals as of 19 August 2025 ‡ National team caps and goals as of 16 June 2019

José Alfredo Quintero Ordóñez (born June 20, 1990) is an Ecuadorian footballer who plays as a defender or midfielder for Ecuadorian Serie A side L.D.U. Quito. He made his debut for Ecuador on 22 February 2017 in a match against the Honduras.

== Career statistics ==
=== Club ===
As of 28 May 2025.

Appearances and goals by club, season and competition
Club	Division	League			Cup		Continental		Total	
Club	Division	Season	Apps	Goals	Apps	Goals	Apps	Goals	Apps	Goals
Cuniburo	Segunda Categoría	2008	19	0	—		—		19	0
Cuniburo	Segunda Categoría	2009	7	0	—		—		7	0
Cuniburo	Segunda Categoría	2010	15	2	—		—		15	2
Cuniburo	Segunda Categoría	2011	31	5	—		—		31	5
Cuniburo	Segunda Categoría	2012	36	7	—		—		36	7
Cuniburo	Total		108	14	0	0	0	0	108	14
Aucas	Serie B	2013	29	6	—		—		29	6
Aucas	Serie B	2014	39	4	—		—		39	4
Aucas	Total		68	10	0	0	0	0	68	10
LDU Quito	Serie A	2015	44	4	—		5	0	49	4
LDU Quito	Serie A	2016	33	2	—		5	1	38	3
LDU Quito	Serie A	2017	18	2	—		2	0	20	2
LDU Quito	Serie A	2018	39	3	0	0	5	0	44	3
LDU Quito	Serie A	2019	24	0	8	0	7	0	39	0
LDU Quito	Serie A	2020	27	2	1	0	7	0	35	2
LDU Quito	Serie A	2021	21	4	2	0	9	0	32	4
LDU Quito	Serie A	2022	23	0	2	0	7	1	32	1
LDU Quito	Serie A	2023	23	5	0	0	13	0	36	5
LDU Quito	Serie A	2024	18	2	2	0	12	0	32	2
LDU Quito	Serie A	2025	8	0	0	0	5	0	13	0
LDU Quito	Total		278	24	15	0	77	2	370	26
Career total			454	48	15	0	77	2	546	50

== Honours ==
LDU Quito

- Ecuadorian Serie A: 2018, 2023
- Copa Ecuador: 2019
- Supercopa Ecuador: 2020, 2021
- Copa Sudamericana : 2023
