= Joseph Espinoza =

Ecuadorian footballer

Personal information
- Full name: Joseph Alejandro Espinoza Montenegro
- Date of birth: July 2, 2000 (age 26)
- Place of birth: Guayaquil, Ecuador
- Height: 1.69 m (5 ft 7 in)
- Position: Midfielder

Team information
- Current team: Atlético Rojiblanco

Youth career
- 2016–2018: LDU Quito

Senior career*
Years	Team	Apps	(Gls)
2019–2024	LDU Quito	35	(0)
2023	→ Emelec (loan)	22	(0)
2024	→ Macará (loan)	14	(0)
2025	Paysandu	8	(0)
2026–	Atlético Rojiblanco	0	(0)

International career^{‡}
2017	Ecuador U17	9	(0)
- * Club domestic league appearances and goals as of 20 March 2026 ‡ National team caps and goals as of 19 July 2017

Joseph Alejandro Espinoza Montenegro (born 7 July 2000) is an Ecuadorian professional footballer who plays as a midfielder for Ecuadorian Serie B club Atlético Rojiblanco.

== Club career ==
Espinoza began his career at LDU Quito, where he won the Ecuadorian Serie A and the Supercopa Ecuador.

In 2023, he was loaned to Emelec. The following year, he was loaned to Macará.

In 2025, he signed for Paysandu.

== International career ==
In 2017, Espinoza was called up for the 2017 South American U-17 Championship.

== Honours ==
LDU Quito

- Ecuadorian Serie A: 2024
- Supercopa Ecuador: 2021

Paysandu

- Copa Verde: 2025
