= Juan Cruz Kaprof =

Argentine footballer

Personal information
- Date of birth: 12 March 1995 (age 31)
- Place of birth: Buenos Aires, Argentina
- Height: 1.69 m (5 ft 7 in)
- Position: Forward

Team information
- Current team: Apollon Kalamarias
- Number: 25

Youth career
- –2013: River Plate

Senior career*
Years	Team	Apps	(Gls)
2013–2018	River Plate	4	(0)
2015–2016	→ Metz (loan)	14	(0)
2016–2018	→ Defensa y Justicia (loan)	34	(3)
2018–2019	Atlético Tucumán	8	(0)
2019–2020	Arsenal de Sarandí	17	(6)
2020–2021	Lecco	9	(0)
2021	LDU Quito	11	(1)
2022	Central Córdoba SdE	15	(0)
2023	Sarmiento	18	(2)
2024–2025	Botoșani	21	(2)
2025–2026	Quilmes	8	(1)
2026	Messina	9	(0)
2026–	Apollon Kalamarias	0	(0)
- * Club domestic league appearances and goals as of 10 May 2026

Juan Cruz Kaprof (born 12 March 1995) is an Argentine professional footballer who plays as a forward for Super League Greece 2 club Apollon Kalamarias.

== Career ==
=== River Plate ===
Born in Buenos Aires, Kaprof is a youth exponent from River Plate. He made his league debut at 19 August 2013 in a 0–0 away draw against Godoy Cruz Antonio Tomba replacing Giovanni Simeone after 69 minutes.

=== Lecco ===
On 1 February 2021, his contract with Lecco was terminated by mutual consent.

== Honours ==
River Plate

- Argentina Primera Division: 2014 Final
- Supercopa Argentina runner-up: 2014
- Copa Campeonato: 2014
- Copa Sudamericana: 2014
- Recopa Sudamericana: 2015

LDU Quito

- Supercopa Ecuador: 2021
