= Moisés Corozo =

Ecuadorian footballer (born 1992)

Personal information
- Full name: Moisés David Corozo Cañizares
- Date of birth: 25 October 1992 (age 34)
- Place of birth: Guayaquil, Ecuador
- Height: 1.85 m (6 ft 1 in)
- Position: Centre back

Team information
- Current team: C.D. El Nacional
- Number: 19

Senior career*
Years	Team	Apps	(Gls)
2010–2011	Panamá	34	(4)
2012–2014	Norte América	5	(0)
2012–2013	→ Trofense (loan)	12	(0)
2013	→ Ferroviarios (loan)	5	(1)
2014–2016	Deportivo Cuenca	43	(0)
2016–2019	Macará	147	(13)
2020–2022	LDU Quito	40	(3)
2023	Mushuc Runa	7	(0)
2024–	C.D. El Nacional	3	(0)

International career^{‡}
2019–	Ecuador	1	(0)
- * Club domestic league appearances and goals as of 15 August 2021 ‡ National team caps and goals as of 14 November 2019

Moisés David Corozo Cañizares (born 25 October 1992) is an Ecuadorean footballer who plays for C.D. El Nacional in the Ecuadorian Serie B as a centre back.

== Honours ==
LDU Quito

- Supercopa Ecuador: 2020, 2021

El Nacional

- Copa Ecuador: 2024
