= Luis Caicedo (footballer, born 1992) =

Ecuadoran footballer (born 1992)

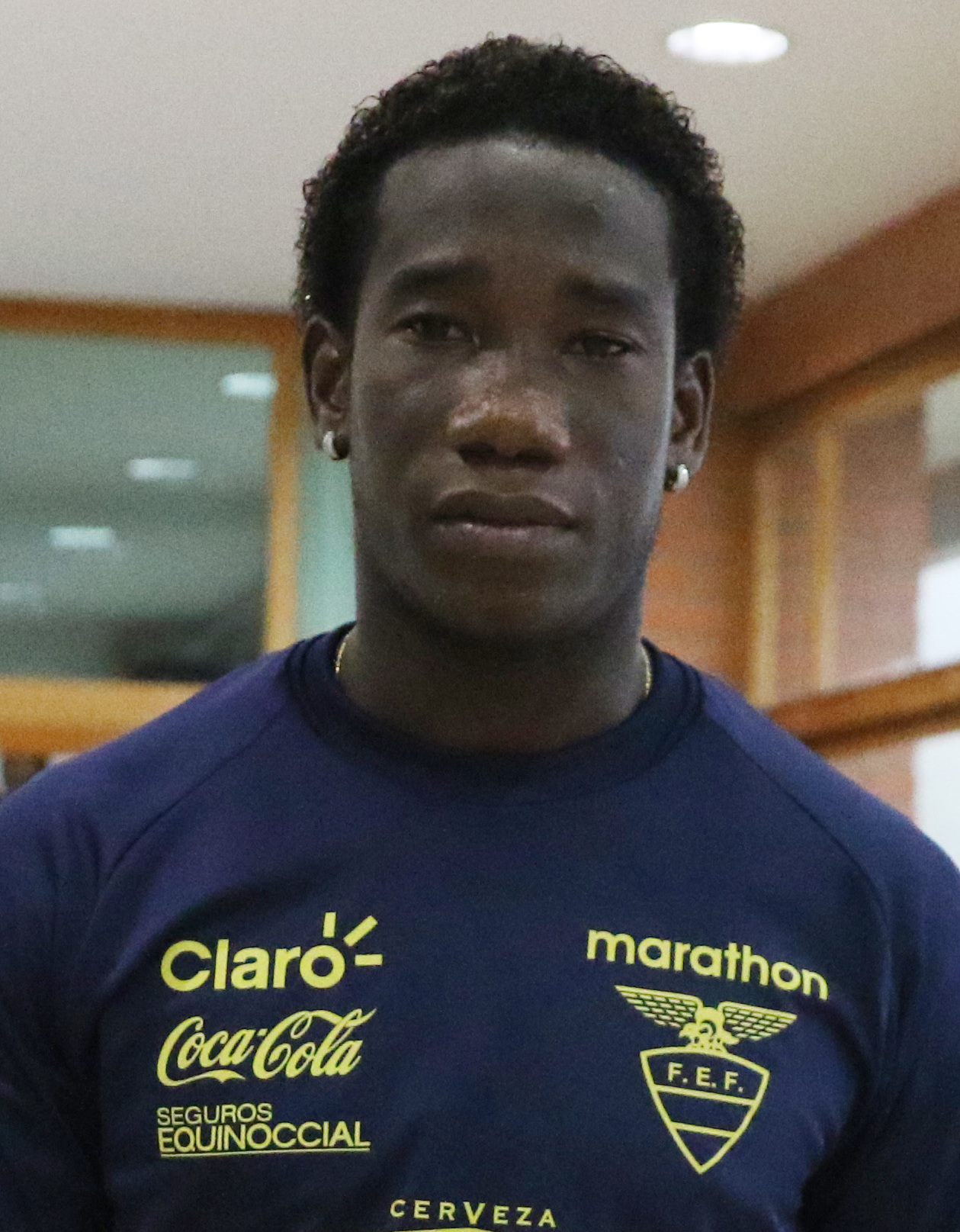
- Caicedo in 2017

Personal information
- Full name: Luis Alberto Caicedo Medina
- Date of birth: 11 May 1992 (age 34)
- Place of birth: Guayaquil, Ecuador
- Height: 1.80 m (5 ft 11 in)
- Position: Centre-back

Team information
- Current team: Deportivo Pasto
- Number: 4

Youth career
- Independiente DV

Senior career*
Years	Team	Apps	(Gls)
2010–2016	Independiente DV	178	(2)
2017–2018	Cruzeiro	15	(0)
2017–2018	→ Barcelona SC (loan)	23	(0)
2018–2019	Veracruz	17	(0)
2019–2022	L.D.U. Quito	54	(0)
2023	Atlético Huila	17	(0)
2024	Deportivo Garcilaso	22	(0)
2025–	Deportivo Pasto	28	(0)

International career^{‡}
2016–	Ecuador	8	(0)
- * Club domestic league appearances and goals as of 12 December 2025 ‡ National team caps and goals as of 16 October 2018

Luis Alberto "Kunty" Caicedo Medina (born 11 May 1992) is an Ecuadorian professional footballer who plays as a central defender for Deportivo Pasto.

== Club career ==
Caicedo played for Independiente del Valle, playing a crucial part in defence as the team finished runners-up in the 2016 Copa Libertadores. In December 2016 Caicedo signed a five-year deal for Brazilian side Cruzeiro.

== Disciplinary ==
In October 2016 Caicedo was suspended for three matches while playing for Independiente for cursing at a referee after a match against Emelec. Afterwards Caicedo claimed that it was the referee who initiated the confrontation and allegedly insulted and made racist remarks about Caidedo's Afro-Ecuadorian ethnicity.

In a match that same month, on 11 October in a World Cup qualifying match against Bolivia, Caicedo was sent off on his second international cap for picking up two yellow cards. In another world cup qualifying match against on 28 March 2017 Caicedo was again sent off for two bookable offenses as Ecuador lost 0–2.

== Honours ==
LDU Quito

- Copa Ecuador: 2019
- Supercopa Ecuador: 2020, 2021
