= Jordy Alcívar =

Ecuadorian footballer (born 1999)

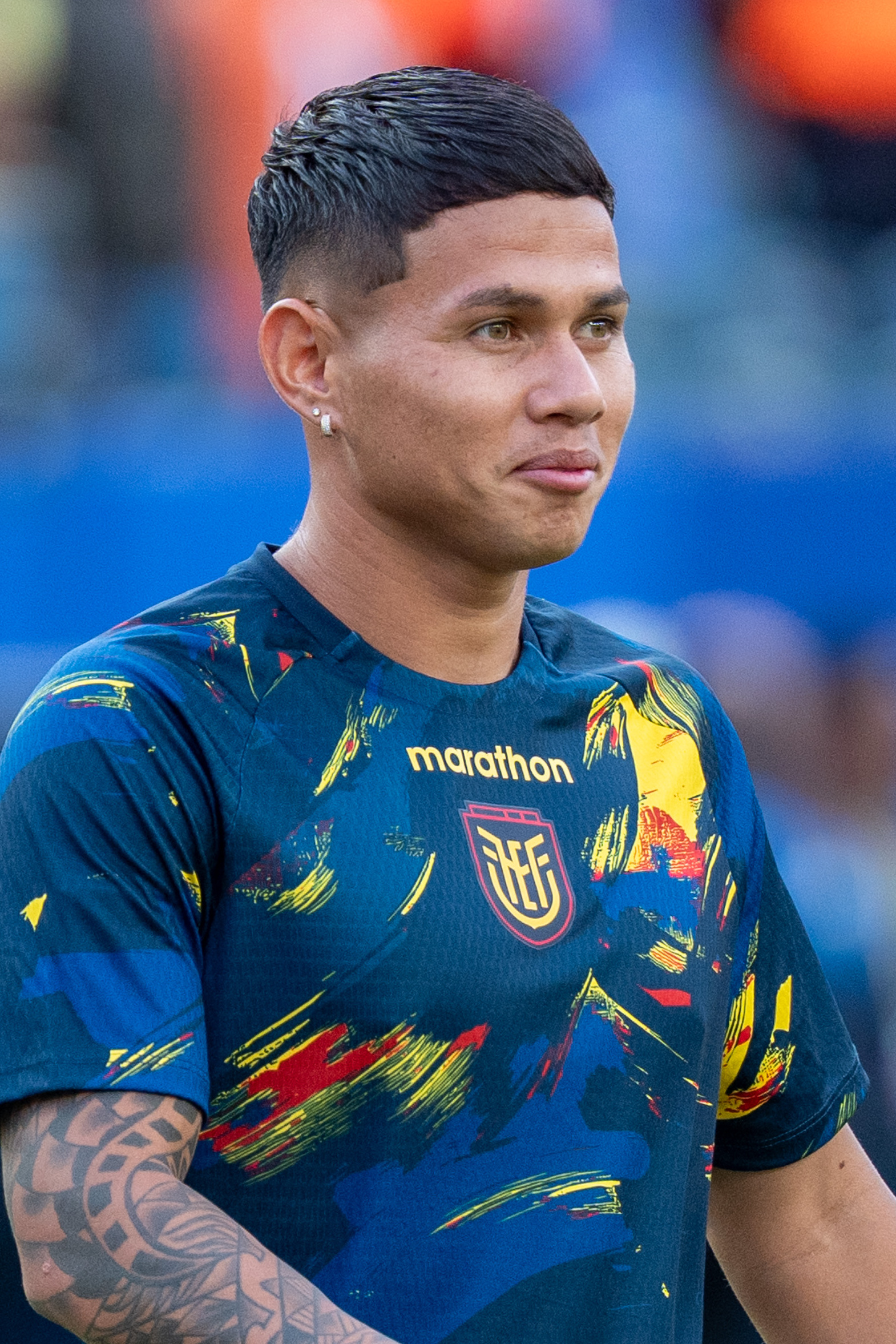
- Alcívar with Ecuador in 2026

Personal information
- Full name: Jordy José Alcívar Macías
- Date of birth: 5 August 1999 (age 27)
- Place of birth: Manta, Ecuador
- Height: 1.72 m (5 ft 8 in)
- Positions: Midfielder; defender

Team information
- Current team: Independiente del Valle
- Number: 6

Youth career
- 2013–2018: LDU Quito

Senior career*
Years	Team	Apps	(Gls)
2018–2021	LDU Quito	64	(3)
2022	Charlotte FC	20	(1)
2022–	Independiente del Valle	77	(5)
2024	→ León (loan)	10	(0)

International career^{‡}
2019	Ecuador U20	13	(0)
2019–2020	Ecuador U23	7	(0)
2021–	Ecuador	14	(1)
Medal record
Men's football
Representing Ecuador
FIFA U-20 World Cup
Third place	2019 Poland
- * Club domestic league appearances and goals as of 9 October 2026 ‡ National team caps and goals as of 5 October 2026

Jordy José Alcívar Macías (born 5 August 1999) is an Ecuadorian professional footballer who plays as a midfielder or defender for Independiente del Valle and the Ecuador national team.

== Club career ==
Alcívar started his career with LDU Quito, where he was nicknamed "La Bochorna 44" after his video game username.

On 18 October 2021, it was announced that Alcívar would join newly-formed Major League Soccer side Charlotte FC in January 2022 on a four-year deal.

Alcívar scored his first goal for Charlotte FC on 10 April 2022 against Atlanta United FC.

On 24 November 2022, Alcívar was transferred to Ecuadorian Serie A side Independiente del Valle.

== International career ==
In 2019, Alcívar won the 2019 South American U-20 Championship, and helped Ecuador come third at the 2019 FIFA U-20 World Cup in Poland.

On 31 May 2026, Alcívar was selected in the 26-man squad for the 2026 FIFA World Cup.

== Career statistics ==
=== Club ===
As of 9 October 2026

Appearances and goals by club, season and competition
Club	Season	League			Cup		Continental		Other		Total	
Club	Season	Division	Apps	Goals	Apps	Goals	Apps	Goals	Apps	Goals	Apps	Goals
LDU Quito	2018	LigaPro Serie A	2	0	—		0	0	—		2	0
LDU Quito	2019	LigaPro Serie A	7	0	—		2 (Note: Appearance(s) in Copa Libertadores)	0	—		9	0
LDU Quito	2020	LigaPro Serie A	27	2	—		4	0	—		31	2
LDU Quito	2021	LigaPro Serie A	28	1	—		10 (Note: Six appearances in Copa Libertadores, Four appearances in Copa Sudamericana)	2 (Note: Two goals in Copa Sudamericana)	2 (Note: Appearance(s) in Supercopa Ecuador)	0	40	3
LDU Quito	Total		64	3	—		16	2	2	0	82	5
Charlotte FC	2022	MLS	20	1	2	0	—		—		22	1
Independiente del Valle	2023	LigaPro Serie A	25	3	—		10 (Note: Eight appearances in Copa Libertadores, Two appearances in CONMEBOL Recopa)	0	2 (Note: One appearance in Supercopa Ecuador, One appearance in UEFA–CONMEBOL Club Challenge)	0	37	3
Independiente del Valle	2024	LigaPro Serie A	6	0	—		2	0	—		8	0
Independiente del Valle	2025	LigaPro Serie A	31	2	1	0	14 (Note: Eight appearances in Copa Sudamericana, six appearances and one goal in Copa Libertadores)	1	—		44	3
Independiente del Valle	2026	LigaPro Serie A	15	0	—		10	1	1	0	26	1
Independiente del Valle	Total		77	5	1	0	34	2	3	0	115	7
León (loan)	2024–25	Liga MX	10	0	—		—		2 (Note: Appearances in Leagues Cup)	0	12	0
Career total			171	9	3	0	50	4	7	0	231	13

=== International ===
As of 5 October 2026

Ecuador
Year	Apps	Goals
2021	1	0
2023	1	0
2025	5	1
2026	7	0
Total	14	1

Scores and results list Venezuela's goal tally first

International goals
No.	Date	Venue	Opponent	Score	Result	Competition
1	14 October 2025	Estadio Akron, Zapopan, Mexico	Mexico	1–1	1–1	Friendly

== Honours ==
LDU Quito

- Ecuadorian Serie A: 2018
- Copa Ecuador: 2019
- Supercopa Ecuador: 2020, 2021

Independiente del Valle

- Supercopa Ecuador: 2023
- Ecuadorian Serie A: 2025

Ecuador U20

- FIFA U-20 World Cup third place: 2019
