= Andersson Ordóñez =

Ecuadorian footballer (born 1994)

Personal information
- Full name: Andersson Rafael Ordóñez Valdéz
- Date of birth: 29 January 1994 (age 32)
- Place of birth: Guayaquil, Ecuador
- Height: 1.86 m (6 ft 1 in)
- Position: Centre-back

Team information
- Current team: C.D. Universidad Católica
- Number: 21

Youth career
- 2009–2011: Barcelona SC

Senior career*
Years	Team	Apps	(Gls)
2012–2016	Barcelona SC	32	(2)
2015	→ El Nacional (loan)	24	(3)
2017–2019	Eintracht Frankfurt	4	(0)
2018–2019	→ LDU Quito (loan)	18	(0)
2019–2021	LDU Quito	20	(1)
2022–	Universidad Católica	6	(0)

International career^{‡}
2013	Ecuador U20	6	(0)
- * Club domestic league appearances and goals as of September 25, 2021 ‡ National team caps and goals as of 22:09, 4 April 2017 (UTC)

Andersson Rafael Ordóñez Valdéz (born 29 January 1994) is an Ecuadorian footballer who plays as a centre-back for C.D. Universidad Católica del Ecuador.

== Honours ==
L.D.U. Quito

- Ecuadorian Serie A: 2018
- Copa Ecuador: 2019
- Supercopa Ecuador: 2020, 2021
