= Adrián Gabbarini =

Argentine footballer (born 1985)

Personal information
- Full name: Adrián José Gabbarini
- Date of birth: 10 October 1985 (age 41)
- Place of birth: Guaymallén, Argentina
- Height: 1.82 m (6 ft 0 in)
- Position: Goalkeeper

Team information
- Current team: LDU Quito (assistant)

Youth career
- 2001–2004: Deportivo Guaymallén
- 2004–2005: Independiente Rivadavia

Senior career*
| Years | Team | Apps | (Gls) |
| 2006–2013 | Independiente | 60 | (0) |
| 2013–2014 | Newell's Old Boys | 0 | (0) |
| 2014–2015 | Argentinos Juniors | 31 | (0) |
| 2016–2017 | Tigre | 2 | (0) |
| 2017 | Olimpo | 28 | (0) |
| 2018–2023 | LDU Quito | 129 | (0) |

International career
| 2010–2011 | Argentina | 3 | (0) |

Managerial career
- 2024–: LDU Quito (assistant)
- * Club domestic league appearances and goals

Adrián José Gabbarini (born 10 October 1985 in Guaymallén) is an Argentine football coach and former player who played as a goalkeeper. He is the current assistant manager of Ecuadorian side LDU Quito.

== Career ==
Gabbarini played youth football for local clubs in Mendoza Province before joining Independiente in 2006. He served as a reserve goalkeeper for several years without making any first team appearances. He made his breakthrough into the first team coming on as a 72nd-minute substitute in a 2–1 away defeat to Estudiantes de La Plata on 13 September 2009. He served as the regular first team goalkeeper for the remainder of the Apertura 2009 tournament.

After playing for LDU Quito, Gabbarini retired in 2023, and subsequently became the club's assistant manager. He was also a manager of the club in both legs of the 2024 Recopa Sudamericana, as manager Josep Alcácer did not have the CONMEBOL qualifications to manage the club.

=== International appearances ===
| # | Date | Venue | Opponent | Final score | Result | Competition |
|---|---|---|---|---|---|---|
| 1. | May 5, 2010 | Cutral Có, Argentina | Haiti | 4–0 | win | Friendly |
| 2. | June 1, 2011 | Abuja, Nigeria | Nigeria | 4–1 | lost | Friendly |
| 3. | June 5, 2011 | Warsaw, Poland | Poland | 2–1 | lost | Friendly |

== Honours ==
Independiente

- Copa Sudamericana : 2010

LDU Quito

- Ecuadorian Serie A: 2018
- Copa Ecuador: 2019
- Supercopa Ecuador: 2020, 2021
- Copa Sudamericana : 2023
