= Christian Cruz =

Ecuadorian footballer (born 1992)

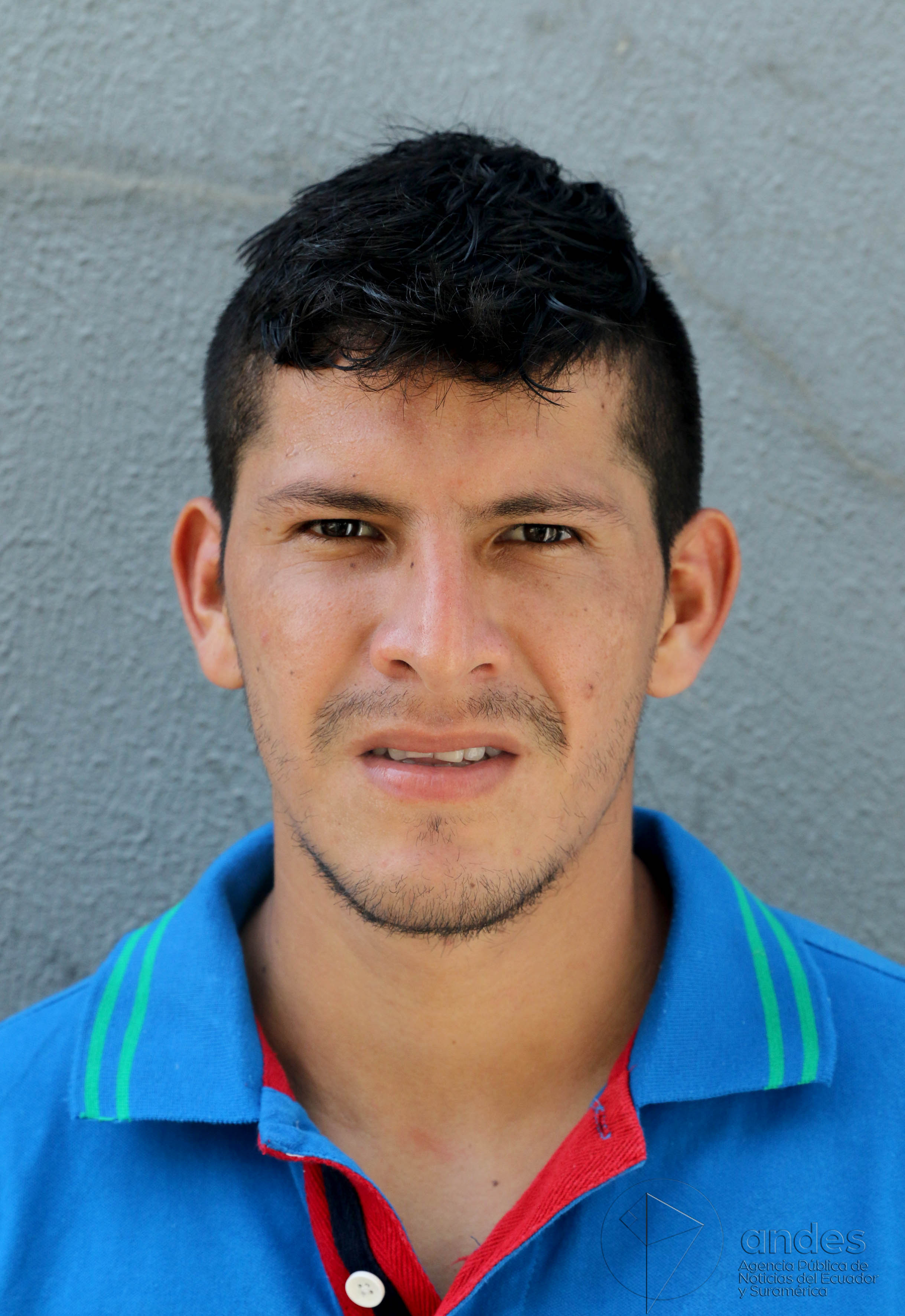
- Tapia in 2016

Personal information
- Full name: Christian Geovanny Cruz Tapia
- Date of birth: 1 August 1992 (age 34)
- Place of birth: Guayaquil, Ecuador
- Height: 1.76 m (5 ft 9 in)
- Position: Left-back

Team information
- Current team: Emelec

Youth career
- 2004–2009: Barcelona SC

Senior career*
Years	Team	Apps	(Gls)
2010–2012	Barcelona SC	29	(0)
2013	→ Guayaquil City (loan)	14	(0)
2014–2018	Guayaquil City	132	(2)
2018	→ LDU Quito (loan)	38	(0)
2019–2022	LDU Quito	81	(4)
2023–	Emelec	0	(0)

International career^{‡}
2011	Ecuador u-20	1	(0)
2017–	Ecuador	3	(0)
- * Club domestic league appearances and goals as of 25 September 2021 ‡ National team caps and goals as of 26 January 2022

Christian Geovanny Cruz Tapia (born 1 August 1992) is an Ecuadorian footballer who plays as a left-back defender for Ecuadorian Serie A side C.S. Emelec.

== Career ==
Tapia started playing for Barcelona SC in 2010 and was signed permanently by the club in the aftermath of the 2011 FIFA U-20 World Cup.

Tapia played for L.D.U. Quito in the 2018 season on loan from Guayaquil City. LDU Quito signed him permanently after the loan deal ended.

== Honours ==
LDU Quito

- Ecuadorian Serie A: 2018
- Copa Ecuador: 2019
- Supercopa Ecuador: 2020, 2021
