= Lucas Villarruel =

Argentine footballer (born 1990)

Personal information
- Full name: Lucas Ariel Villarruel
- Date of birth: 13 November 1990 (age 36)
- Place of birth: Ramos Mejía, Argentina
- Height: 1.72 m (5 ft 7 1/2 in)
- Position: Midfielder

Team information
- Current team: LDU Quito

Youth career
- Huracán

Senior career*
Years	Team	Apps	(Gls)
2012–2018	Huracán	114	(2)
2016–2018	→ Olimpo (loan)	45	(0)
2018–2020	Defensa y Justicia	4	(0)
2019	→ Newell's Old Boys (loan)	12	(0)
2020–	LDU Quito	37	(2)
- * Club domestic league appearances and goals as of 19:36, 7 August 2022 (UTC)

Lucas Ariel Villarruel (born 13 November 1990) is an Argentine professional footballer who plays as a midfielder for L.D.U. Quito.

== Career ==
Villarruel started his career in 2012 with Huracán. He made his debut on 5 March in an away win against Boca Unidos in Primera B Nacional, which was the first of seven appearances during 2011–12. In November 2012, Villarruel scored his first senior goal in a 0–4 win versus Almirante Brown. At the end of the 2014 Primera B Nacional season, after he had scored two goals in ninety-seven appearances, Huracán won promotion to the Argentine Primera División. On 30 June 2016, Olimpo signed Villarruel on loan for the 2016–17 campaign. After twenty-seven appearances in all competitions, his loan was renewed in July 2017.

He returned to Huracán on 16 May 2018, following a total of fifty appearances for Olimpo over two seasons for Olimpo. Villarruel joined Defensa y Justicia in the following July. After six matches in twelve months for Defensa, Villarruel left on loan in August 2019 to league counterparts Newell's Old Boys. He remained until the succeeding December, appearing twelve times for them; though just four were as a starter. January 2020 saw Villarruel head abroad for the first time, joining Ecuadorian Serie A club L.D.U. Quito on loan for one year. He made his debut in a three-goal Clásico Quiteño victory away to El Nacional on 28 February, with his first goal arriving on 3 October against Mushuc Runa.

== Career statistics ==
As of 19 September 2021.

Club statistics
Club	Season	League			Cup		League Cup		Continental		Other		Total	
Club	Season	Division	Apps	Goals	Apps	Goals	Apps	Goals	Apps	Goals	Apps	Goals	Apps	Goals
Huracán	2011–12	Primera B Nacional	7	0	0	0	—		—		0	0	7	0
Huracán	2012–13	Primera B Nacional	29	2	1	0	—		—		0	0	30	2
Huracán	2013–14	Primera B Nacional	37	0	0	0	—		—		0	0	37	0
Huracán	2014	Primera B Nacional	19	0	3	0	—		—		1 (Note: Appearance(s) in the Primera B Nacional play-offs)	0	23	0
Huracán	2015	Primera División	14	0	1	0	—		12 (Note: Appearance(s) in the Copa Libertadores and Copa Sudamericana)	1	1 (Note: Appearance(s) in the Supercopa Argentina)	0	28	1
Huracán	2016	Primera División	8	0	0	0	—		4 (Note: Appearance(s) in the Copa Libertadores)	0	0	0	12	0
Huracán	2016–17	Primera División	0	0	0	0	—		0	0	0	0	0	0
Huracán	2017–18	Primera División	0	0	0	0	—		0	0	0	0	0	0
Huracán	Total		114	2	5	0	—		16	1	2	0	137	3
Olimpo (loan)	2016–17	Primera División	25	0	2	0	—		—		0	0	27	0
Olimpo (loan)	2017–18	Primera División	20	0	3	0	—		—		0	0	23	0
Olimpo (loan)	Total		45	0	5	0	—		—		0	0	50	0
Defensa y Justicia	2018–19	Primera División	3	0	0	0	0	0	1 (Note: Appearance(s) in the Copa Sudamericana)	0	0	0	4	0
Defensa y Justicia	2019–20	Primera División	1	0	1	0	0	0	0	0	0	0	2	0
Defensa y Justicia	2020–21	Primera División	0	0	0	0	0	0	—		0	0	0	0
Defensa y Justicia	Total		4	0	1	0	0	0	1	0	0	0	6	0
Newell's Old Boys (loan)	2019–20	Primera División	12	0	0	0	0	0	—		0	0	12	0
L.D.U. Quito (loan)	2020	Serie A	23	2	—		—		7	0	—		30	2
L.D.U. Quito (loan)	2021	Serie A	13	0	—		—		4	0	2 (Note: Appearance(s) in the Supercopa Ecuador)	0	19	0
L.D.U. Quito (loan)	Total		36	2	—		—		11	0	2	0	49	2
Career total			211	4	11	0	0	0	28	1	4	0	254	5

== Honours ==
Huracán

- Copa Argentina: 2013–14
- Supercopa Argentina: 2014

LDU Quito

- Supercopa Ecuador: 2020, 2021
