= Carlos Cuero =

Ecuadorian footballer (born 1996)

Personal information
- Full name: Carlos Andrés Cuero Quiñónez
- Date of birth: 17 February 1996 (age 30)
- Place of birth: Esmeraldas, Ecuador
- Height: 1.83 m (6 ft 0 in)
- Position: Midfielder

Team information
- Current team: Aucas
- Number: 19

Youth career
- 2008–2010: Fundacion Amiga
- 2010–2011: Norte América
- 2011–2016: Independiente del Valle

Senior career*
Years	Team	Apps	(Gls)
2012–2017	Independiente del Valle	21	(1)
2017–2019	Cuenca	53	(0)
2019	Aucas	125	(7)
2024–2025	→ Delfín (Loan)	40	(1)

International career^{‡}
2018–	Ecuador	1	(0)
- * Club domestic league appearances and goals as of 26 May 2026 ‡ National team caps and goals as of 12 October 2018

Carlos Andrés Cuero Quiñónez (born 18 February 1996 in Esmeraldas, Ecuador) is an Ecuadorean professional footballer who plays as a defender for S.D. Aucas in the Ecuadorian Serie A.

== Club career ==
Cuero was at C.S.D. Independiente del Valle, but transferred to Cuenca as a makeweight in the player and cash deal, that saw the goalkeeper Hamilton Piedra move the other way.

== International career ==
In October 2018, Cuero was called up to the Ecuador national football team by manager Hernán Darío Gómez. On October 12, 2018, he made his debut for the full national side in a friendly against the Qatar.

== Honours ==
Aucas

- Serie A: 2022
