= Luis Amarilla =

Paraguayan footballer (born 1995)

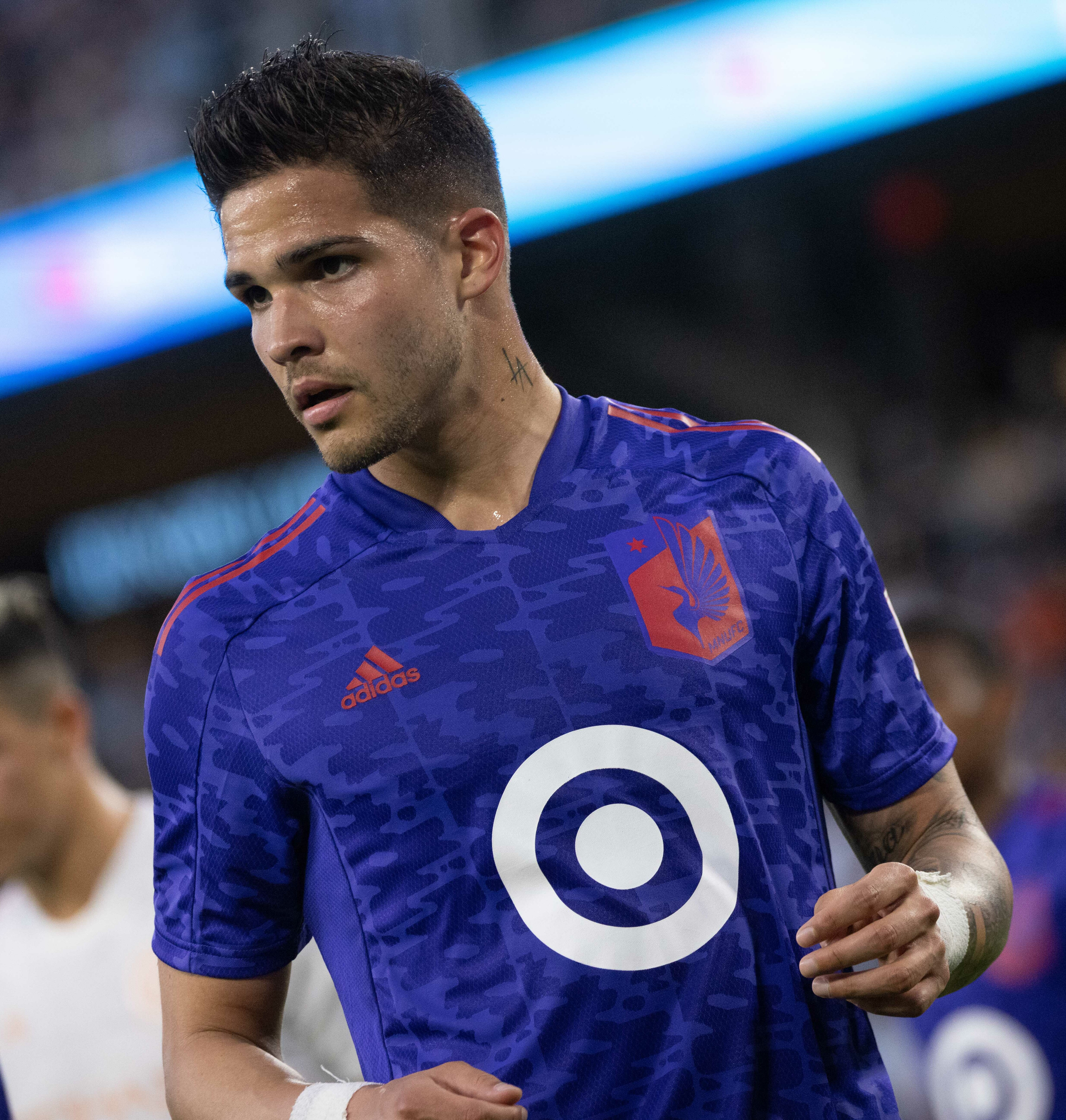
- Amarilla with Minnesota United in 2022

Personal information
- Full name: Luis Antonio Amarilla Lencina
- Date of birth: 25 August 1995 (age 31)
- Place of birth: Areguá, Paraguay
- Height: 1.82 m (6 ft 0 in)
- Position: Forward

Team information
- Current team: Juventude (on loan from Cerro Porteño)
- Number: 18

Senior career*
Years	Team	Apps	(Gls)
2013–2016	Libertad	13	(0)
2014	→ 3 de Febrero (loan)	5	(0)
2016	→ Sol de América (loan)	20	(1)
2017–2022	Vélez Sarsfield	12	(1)
2019	→ Universidad Católica (loan)	24	(19)
2020	→ Minnesota United (loan)	7	(2)
2021	→ LDU Quito (loan)	31	(15)
2022–2023	Minnesota United	53	(13)
2023–2025	Mazatlán	51	(14)
2025–	Cerro Porteño	25	(1)
2026–	→ Juventude (loan)	8	(1)

International career^{‡}
2015	Paraguay U20	5	(1)
2021–	Paraguay	4	(0)
- * Club domestic league appearances and goals as of 16 November 2026 ‡ National team caps and goals as of 27 January 2022

Luis Antonio Amarilla Lencina (born 25 August 1995) is a Paraguayan professional footballer who plays as a striker for Juventude, on loan from Cerro Porteño.

== International career ==
He made his debut for the Paraguay national football team on 2 September 2021 in a World Cup qualifier against Ecuador, a 0–2 away loss. He started the game and played the full match.

== Honours ==
Libertad

- Paraguayan Primera División: 2014 Clausura

LDU Quito

- Supercopa Ecuador: 2021
