= Djorkaeff Reasco =

Ecuadorian footballer (born 1999)

Personal information
- Full name: Djorkaeff Néicer Reasco González
- Date of birth: 18 January 1999 (age 27)
- Place of birth: Quito, Ecuador
- Height: 1.72 m (5 ft 8 in)
- Position: Forward

Team information
- Current team: Independiente del Valle (on loan from Instituto Córdoba)
- Number: 99

Youth career
- –2012: LDU Quito
- 2012: Clan Juvenil
- 2013–2016: LDU Quito

Senior career*
Years	Team	Apps	(Gls)
2016–2022	LDU Quito	32	(10)
2020	→ Dorados (loan)	13	(1)
2022–2023	Newell's Old Boys	39	(3)
2023–	Instituto Córdoba	21	(1)
2024	→ Barcelona SC (loan)	14	(1)
2025	→ El Nacional (loan)	34	(17)
2026–	→ Independiente del Valle (loan)	26	(10)

International career^{‡}
2021–	Ecuador	5	(0)
- * Club domestic league appearances and goals as of 17:54, 14 February 2025 (UTC) ‡ National team caps and goals as of 07:45, 30 November 2022 (UTC)

Djorkaeff Néicer Reasco González (born 18 January 1999) is an Ecuadorian professional footballer who plays as a forward for Independiente del Valle on loan from Instituto Córdoba and the Ecuador national team.

== Career ==
On 10 February 2022, Reasco was announced at Newell's Old Boys on a three-year contract. He left the club after playing 44 matches and scoring 4 goals.

On 30 August 2023, Reasco was announced at Instituto Córdoba on a three-and-a-half-year contract.

On 3 February 2024, Reasco was announced at Barcelona SC on loan. He scored his first league goal against El Nacional on 19 April 2024, scoring in the 73rd minute.

== International career ==
Reasco was named in the Ecuadorian squad for the 2022 FIFA World Cup.

== Personal life ==
He is named after Youri Djorkaeff and is the son of former Ecuadorian international footballer Néicer Reasco, who was playing for LDU Quito in the same game that Reasco Jr made his debut in.

== Career statistics ==
=== Club ===
As of 7 October 2021.

Club	Season	League			Cup		Continental		Other		Total	
Club	Season	Division	Apps	Goals	Apps	Goals	Apps	Goals	Apps	Goals	Apps	Goals
L.D.U. Quito	2016	Serie A	1	0	0	0	0	0	0	0	1	0
L.D.U. Quito	2017	Serie A	7	2	0	0	0	0	0	0	7	2
L.D.U. Quito	2018	Serie A	5	0	0	0	0	0	0	0	5	0
L.D.U. Quito	2019	Serie A	0	0	0	0	0	0	0	0	0	0
L.D.U. Quito	2020	Serie A	0	0	0	0	0	0	0	0	0	0
L.D.U. Quito	2021	Serie A	17	7	0	0	4 (Note: Three appearances and one goal in the Copa Sudamericana, one appearance in the Copa Libertadores)	1	1 (Note: Appearances in the Supercopa Ecuador)	0	22	8
L.D.U. Quito	Total		26	9	0	0	4	1	1	0	31	10
Dorados de Sinaloa (loan)	2019–20	Ascenso MX	4	0	1 (Note: Appearances in the Copa MX)	0	–		0	0	5	0
Dorados de Sinaloa (loan)	2020–21	Liga de Expansión MX	9	1	0	0	–		0	0	9	1
Dorados de Sinaloa (loan)	Total		13	1	1	0	0	0	0	0	13	1
Career total			39	10	1	0	4	1	1	0	44	11

=== International ===
As of 29 November 2022

Ecuador
Year	Apps	Goals
2021	2	0
2022	3	0
Total	5	0
