= Santiago Scotto =

Uruguayan football player (born 1997)

Personal information
- Full name: Santiago Scotto Padín
- Date of birth: 26 April 1997 (age 29)
- Place of birth: Montevideo, Uruguay
- Height: 1.82 m (6 ft 0 in)
- Position: Midfielder

Team information
- Current team: Sud América

Youth career
- River Plate Montevideo

Senior career*
Years	Team	Apps	(Gls)
2018–2021	Montevideo City Torque	87	(3)
2021–2023	L.D.U. Quito	14	(1)
2022–2023	→ Defensor Sporting (loan)	16	(0)
2023–2024	Fénix	9	(0)
2025	Platense		
2025	Tacuarembó	15	(0)
2026–	Sud América	0	(0)
- * Club domestic league appearances and goals as of 21 June 2026

Santiago Scotto Padín (born 26 April 1997) is a Uruguayan professional footballer who plays as a midfielder for Uruguayan Segunda División club Sud América.

== Career ==
A former youth academy player of River Plate Montevideo, Scotto joined Montevideo City Torque in January 2018. He made his professional debut for the club on 4 March 2018 in a 2–2 draw against River Plate.

On 31 July 2021, Scotto joined Ecuadorian Serie A club L.D.U. Quito.

== Career statistics ==
As of 22 October 2022

Appearances and goals by club, season and competition
Club	Season	League			Cup		Continental		Other		Total	
Club	Season	Division	Apps	Goals	Apps	Goals	Apps	Goals	Apps	Goals	Apps	Goals
Montevideo City Torque	2018	Uruguayan Primera División	30	1	—		—		1 (Note: Appearance in Torneo Intermedio final.)	0	31	1
Montevideo City Torque	2019	Uruguayan Segunda División	18	0	—		—		—		18	0
Montevideo City Torque	2020	Uruguayan Primera División	32	2	—		—		—		32	2
Montevideo City Torque	2021	Uruguayan Primera División	7	0	—		6 (Note: Appearances in Copa Sudamericana.)	2	—		13	2
Montevideo City Torque	Total		87	3	0	0	6	2	1	0	94	5
L.D.U. Quito	2021	Ecuadorian Serie A	10	1	—		2	0	—		12	1
L.D.U. Quito	2022	Ecuadorian Serie A	4	0	0	0	2	0	—		6	0
L.D.U. Quito	Total		14	1	0	0	4	0	0	0	18	1
Defensor Sporting (loan)	2022	Uruguayan Primera División	7	0	3	1	—		—		10	1
Career total			108	4	3	1	10	2	1	0	122	7

== Honours ==
Montevideo City Torque

- Uruguayan Segunda División: 2019

Defensor Sporting

- Copa Uruguay: 2022
