= Robert Burbano =

Ecuadorian footballer (born 1995)

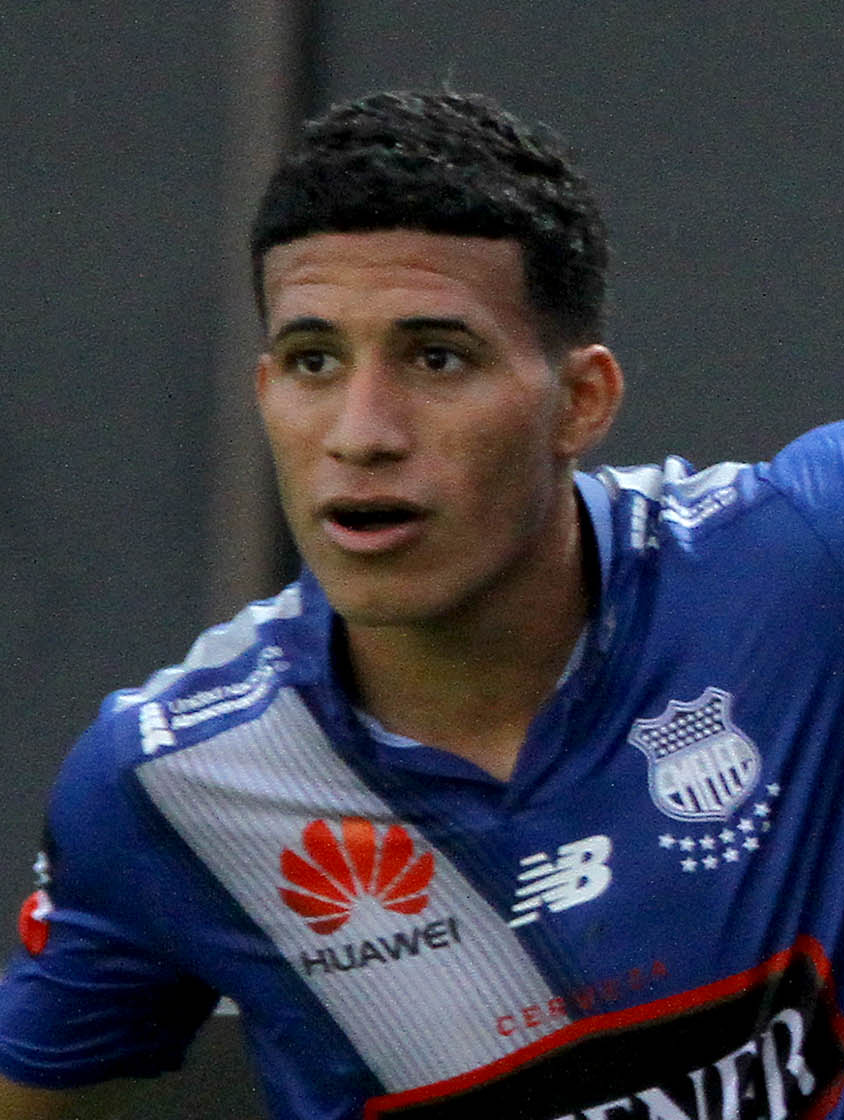
- Burbano playing for Emelec in 2015

Personal information
- Full name: Robert Javier Burbano Cobeña
- Date of birth: 10 April 1995 (age 31)
- Place of birth: Quevedo, Ecuador
- Height: 1.80 m (5 ft 11 in)
- Position: Winger

Team information
- Current team: Avaí
- Number: 40

Youth career
- 2010–2012: Independiente del Valle

Senior career*
Years	Team	Apps	(Gls)
2012–2013	Independiente del Valle	2	(1)
2013–2022	Emelec	153	(4)
2019	→ Delfín (loan)	29	(4)
2021	→ Delfín (loan)	29	(3)
2022–2024	Orense	73	(8)
2025–	Avaí	0	(0)

International career
2014–2015	Ecuador U20	9	(1)
- * Club domestic league appearances and goals

Robert Javier Burbano Cobeña (born 10 April 1995) is an Ecuadorian footballer who plays as a winger for Avaí.

== Club career ==
=== Youth career ===
Robert Burbano began his professional career with Independiente del Valle, but only played 2 games in 2012. He was later signed by Club Sport Emelec.

=== Emelec ===
==== 2013–2015 ====
With Emelec, Burbano was given more playing time by Emelec coach Gustavo Quinteros, playing 9 games in the 2013 season. Robert Burbano became 2013 Serie A season champions that year. Robert Burbano got much more playing time in the 2014 Serie A season with Emelec. His only goal of the season came March 23, in a 3–0 win over L.D.U. Quito. He proved to be an important player for Quintero's Emelec, and reached the 2014 Ecuadorian Serie A season final against Barcelona S.C., and won the league that year. Robert Burbano scored his first international club–goal of the 2015 season on March 4, in a 2015 Copa Libertadores group–stage match against Sport Club Internacional, though lost the match 3–2.

== Honors ==
Emelec

- Serie A (5): 2013, 2014, 2015, 2017, 2019

Avaí

- Campeonato Catarinense: 2025
