= Hamilton Piedra =

Ecuadorian footballer (born 1993)

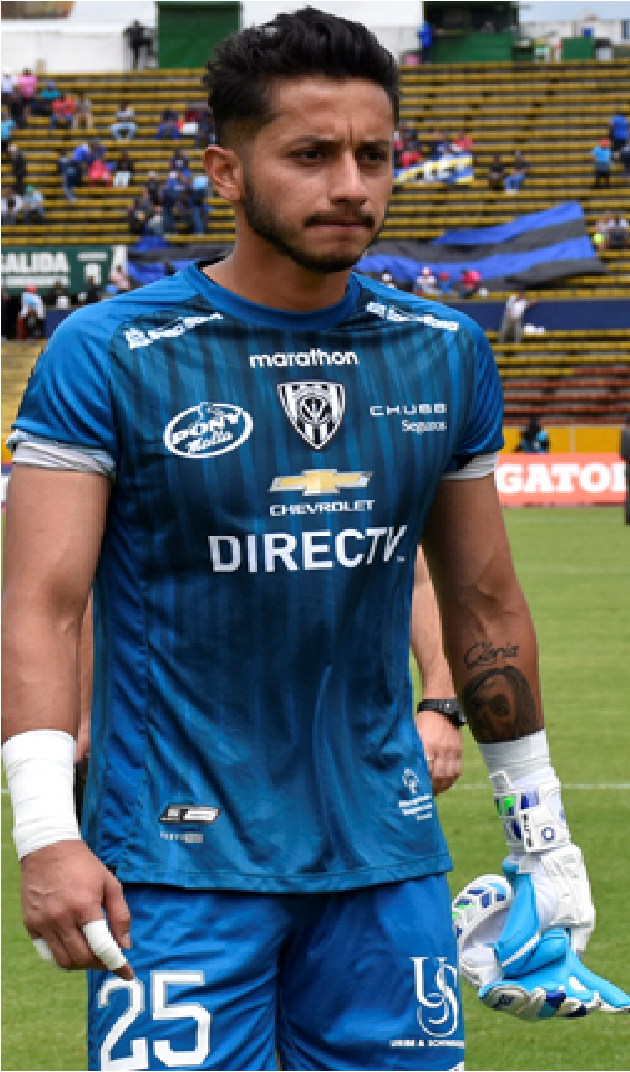

Personal information
- Full name: Hamilton Emanuel Piedra Ordóñez
- Date of birth: 20 February 1993 (age 33)
- Place of birth: Loja, Ecuador
- Height: 1.90 m (6 ft 3 in)
- Position: Goalkeeper

Team information
- Current team: S.D. Aucas
- Number: 32

Youth career
- 2007–2011: Deportivo Cuenca

Senior career*
Years	Team	Apps	(Gls)
2011–2017	Deportivo Cuenca	157	(0)
2017–2021	Independiente del Valle	31	(0)
2021	→ Manta (loan)	26	(0)
2022-2024	Deportivo Cuenca	87	(0)
2025–	Aucas	49	(0)

International career^{‡}
2017–	Ecuador	1	(0)
- * Club domestic league appearances and goals as of 26 May 2026 ‡ National team caps and goals as of 27 July 2017

Hamilton Emanuel Piedra Ordóñez (born Loja, Ecuador, 20 February 1993) is an Ecuadorean professional footballer who plays as a goalkeeper for Aucas in the Ecuadorian Serie A.

Piedra joined C.D. Cuenca in 2011 and became established as first choice goalkeeper in 2014, going on to make 157 league appearances for the club. Piedra was announced as joining Independiente on a 5-year contract in a cash plus players deal in November 2017.

== International career ==
Piedra made his debut for the senior Ecuador side on 27 July 2017, against the Trinidad and Tobago national football team in a 3-1 international friendly victory held at the Estadio George Capwell.
