= Adolfo Muñoz =

Ecuadorian footballer (born 1997)

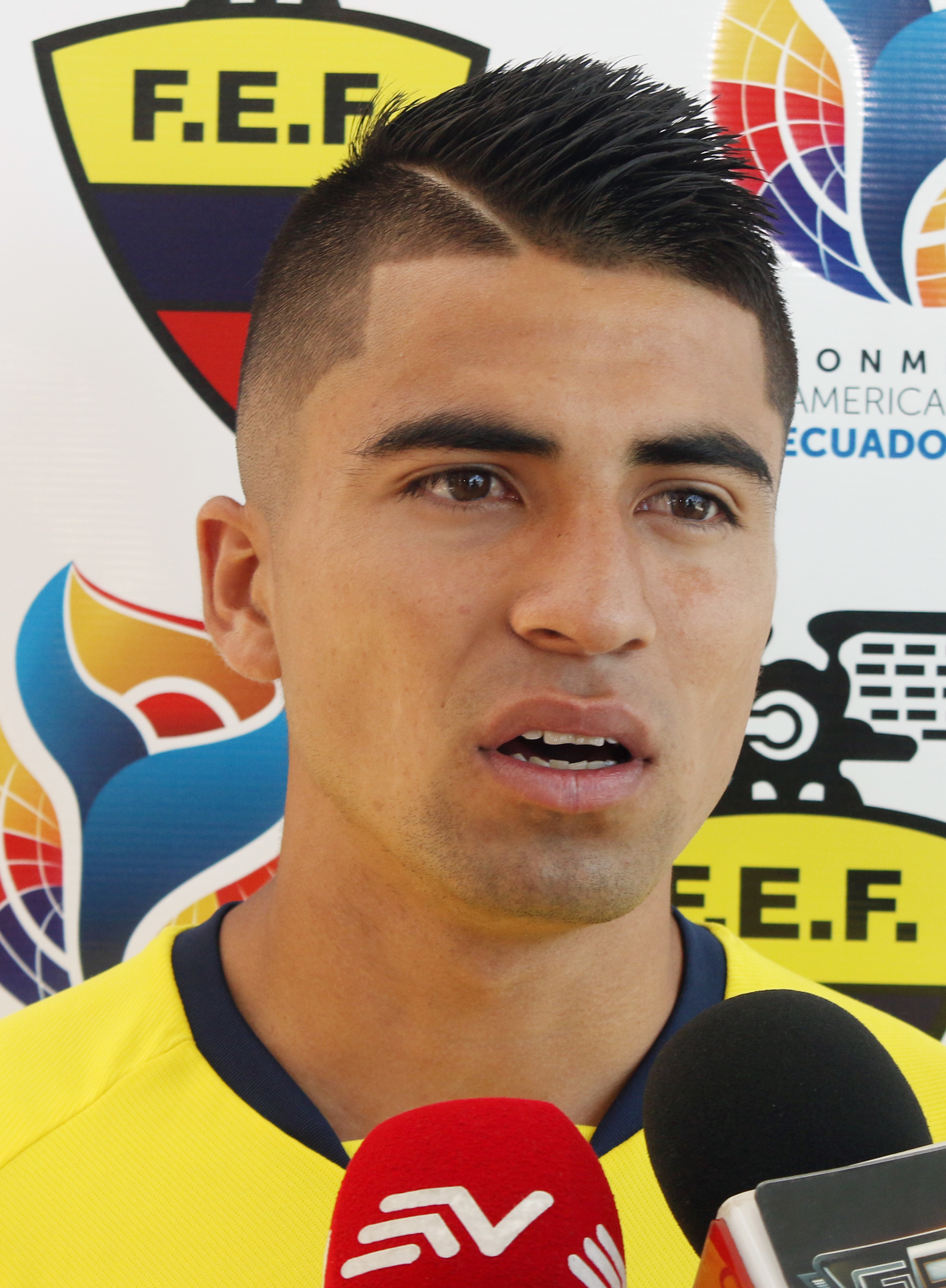

Personal information
- Full name: Adolfo Alejandro Muñoz Cervantes
- Date of birth: 12 December 1997 (age 28)
- Place of birth: Buena Fe, Ecuador
- Position: Midfielder

Team information
- Current team: C.S.D. Macará

Youth career
- 2011–2014: El Nacional

Senior career*
Years	Team	Apps	(Gls)
2015–2018	El Nacional	108	(19)
2019–2022	L.D.U. Quito	74	(15)
2022	Guayaquil City	1	(0)
2023	Orense	0	(0)
2023	Técnico Universitario	0	(0)
2024	Aucas	0	(0)

International career^{‡}
2017	Ecuador U20	6	(0)
2020–	Ecuador	1	(0)
- * Club domestic league appearances and goals as of September 25, 2021 ‡ National team caps and goals as of November 17, 2020

Adolfo Alejandro Muñoz Cervantes (born 12 December 1997) is an Ecuadorian footballer who plays for Macará.

== Club career ==
He began his career with El Nacional in 2015.

== Career statistics ==
As of September 25, 2021

Club	Season	League		Cup		International		Other		Total	
Club	Season	Apps	Goals	Apps	Goals	Apps	Goals	Apps	Goals	Apps	Goals
El Nacional	2015	19	1	—	—	—	—	—	—	19	1
El Nacional	2016	23	2	—	—	—	—	—	—	23	2
El Nacional	2017	34	11	—	—	0	0	—	—	34	11
El Nacional	2018	32	5	—	—	3	0	—	—	35	5
El Nacional	Total	108	19	—	—	3	0	—	—	111	19
L.D.U. Quito	2019	22	1	5	1	3	0	—	—	30	2
L.D.U. Quito	2020	17	7	—	—	4	2	1	0	22	9
L.D.U. Quito	2021	24	7	—	—	7	0	1	0	32	7
L.D.U. Quito	2022	11	0	—	—	5	0	—	—	16	0
L.D.U. Quito	Total	74	15	5	1	19	2	2	0	100	18
Career total		182	34	5	1	22	2	2	0	211	37
