= Billy Arce =

Ecuadorian footballer (born 1998)

Personal information
- Full name: Billy Vladimir Arce Mina
- Date of birth: 12 July 1998 (age 28)
- Place of birth: Esmeraldas, Ecuador
- Height: 1.78 m (5 ft 10 in)
- Positions: Winger; forward

Team information
- Current team: Bolívar
- Number: 10

Youth career
- 2008–2012: La Paz
- 2009: → Fedeguayas (loan)
- 2010: → Fedeguayas (loan)
- 2011–2012: → Fedeguayas (loan)
- 2012–2013: Emelec
- 2013–2017: Independiente del Valle

Senior career*
Years	Team	Apps	(Gls)
2017–2018	Independiente del Valle	52	(18)
2018–2022	Brighton & Hove Albion	0	(0)
2018–2019	→ Extremadura (loan)	3	(0)
2019	→ Emelec (loan)	6	(2)
2019	→ Barcelona SC (loan)	8	(1)
2020–2021	→ LDU Quito (loan)	47	(3)
2022	Independiente del Valle	15	(2)
2022	Peñarol	2	(0)
2023	Deportivo Pasto	14	(1)
2023–2024	Once Caldas	39	(7)
2024	Santos	2	(0)
2025	Atletico Nacional	27	(2)
2026	Mazatlán	7	(0)
2026–	Bolívar	0	(0)
- * Club domestic league appearances and goals as of 11 December 2025

Billy Vladimir Arce Mina (born 12 July 1998) is an Ecuadorian footballer who plays either as a left winger or a forward for FBF División Profesional club Bolívar.

== Club career ==
=== Independiente del Valle ===
Born in Esmeraldas, Arce finished his formation with Independiente del Valle, after playing for Emelec, CSCD Fedeguayas and CSCD La Paz. He made his first-team debut for the former on 5 February 2017, starting and scoring the game's only through a penalty kick in a home defeat of Deportivo Cuenca.

On 25 November 2017, Arce scored a brace in a 4–1 home routing of Guayaquil City. He finished his first senior campaign with 12 goals in 39 appearances, being the club's second-best goalscorer behind Michael Estrada.

=== Brighton & Hove Albion ===
On 3 August 2018, Independiente del Valle confirmed Arce's transfer to Premier League side Brighton & Hove Albion. His new club officially announced the deal four days later, on a reported four-year contract.

==== Loan to Extremadura ====
On the same day for being announced at the English club, Arce penned a loan move to Segunda División club Extremadura UD. He only featured in four matches overall for the club, and left in December after "having trouble adapting to the league".

==== Loan to Emelec ====
On 8 January 2019, after being rarely used, Arce returned to his home country after agreeing a loan move to Emelec. In May, he was left out of several matches of the club after being photographed in a party, being subsequently demoted to the reserve squad before leaving.

==== Loan to Barcelona SC ====
After being rarely used, Arce moved to fellow league team Barcelona SC also on loan on 23 July 2019. He spent the month of October away from trainings after being arrested, only returning on the 25th.

==== Loan to LDU Quito ====
On 24 January 2020, Arce was announced at LDU Quito. Regularly used as a substitute, his loan was renewed for a further year on 29 January 2021.

==== Return to Brighton ====
On 31 January 2022, Brighton announced the return of Arce, and initially assigned him to the under-23 squad. On 1 March, the club reached an agreement with Arce to terminate his contract; he left the club without making a senior appearance for them.

=== Independiente del Valle return ===
On 8 March 2022, Arce returned to his first club Independiente del Valle on a deal until the end of the year. He left the club in July, after just 17 matches.

=== Peñarol ===
On 20 July 2022, Arce was announced at Uruguayan Primera División side Peñarol on a short-term contract. He only featured in three matches, and was deemed surplus to requirements in September.

=== Deportivo Pasto ===
On 6 January 2023, Arce switched teams and countries again, after signing for Colombian Categoría Primera A side Deportivo Pasto. Despite being regularly used, he left the side in June.

=== Once Caldas ===
On 17 June 2023, Arce was presented at Once Caldas. He became an undisputed starter for the side, but departed the club roughly one year later.

=== Santos ===
On 31 July 2024, free agent Arce signed a contract with Campeonato Brasileiro Série B side Santos until December 2025. He made his debut for the club on 17 August, replacing Serginho in a 1–0 home loss to Avaí.

On 20 December 2024, after just two matches and 35 minutes of action, Arce's contract with Santos was rescinded.

== Personal life ==
In October 2019, Arce was jailed for twenty days having been arrested for drink-driving.

== Career statistics ==
As of 16 September 2024

Club	Season	League			Cup		League Cup		Continental		Other		Total	
Club	Season	Division	Apps	Goals	Apps	Goals	Apps	Goals	Apps	Goals	Apps	Goals	Apps	Goals
Independiente del Valle	2017	Ecuadorian Serie A	32	12	0	0	—		2 (Note: Appearance(s) in Copa Libertadores)	0	—		34	12
Independiente del Valle	2018	Ecuadorian Serie A	20	6	0	0	—		2	1	—		22	7
Independiente del Valle	Total		52	18	0	0	—		4	1	—		56	19
Brighton & Hove Albion	2018–19	Premier League	0	0	0	0	0	0	—		—		0	0
Extremadura (loan)	2018–19	Segunda División	3	0	1	0	—						4	0
Emelec (loan)	2019	Ecuadorian Serie A	6	2	0	0	—		4	0	—		10	2
Barcelona SC (loan)	2019	Ecuadorian Serie A	8	1	2	0	—		0	0	—		10	1
LDU Quito (loan)	2020	Ecuadorian Serie A	26	3	—		—		8	1	0	0	34	4
LDU Quito (loan)	2021	Ecuadorian Serie A	21	0	—		—		7 (Note: Six appearances and four goals in Copa Libertadores, one appearance in Copa Sudamericana)	4	2 (Note: Appearance(s) in Supercopa Ecuador)	2	30	6
LDU Quito (loan)	Total		47	3	—		—		15	5	2	2	64	10
Independiente del Valle	2022	Ecuadorian Serie A	11	1	2	0	—		6 (Note: Five appearances and one goal in Copa Libertadores, one appearance in Copa Sudamericana)	1	—		19	2
Peñarol	2022	Uruguayan Primera División	2	0	1	0	—		—		—		3	0
Deportivo Pasto	2023	Categoría Primera A	17	1	0	0	—		—		—		17	1
Once Caldas	2023	Categoría Primera A	17	2	—		—		—		—		17	2
Once Caldas	2024	Categoría Primera A	22	5	1	0	—		—		—		23	5
Once Caldas	Total		39	7	1	0	—		—		—		40	7
Santos	2024	Série B	2	0	—		—		—		—		2	0
Career total			187	33	7	0	0	0	29	7	2	2	225	42

== Honours ==
Santos

- Campeonato Brasileiro Série B: 2024
