= Brayan Caicedo =

Colombian footballer (born 2006)

Brayan Mateo Caicedo
Personal information
- Full name: Brayan Mateo Caicedo Ramos
- Date of birth: 14 August 2006 (age 20)
- Place of birth: Tumaco, Colombia
- Height: 1.76 m (5 ft 9 in)
- Position: Winger

Team information
- Current team: Porto B
- Number: 87

Youth career
- Comfamiliar
- Gambeta
- Bogotá
- Cyclones

Senior career*
Years	Team	Apps	(Gls)
2023–2024	Leones	8	(0)
2024–	Porto B	21	(3)

International career^{‡}
2022–2023	Colombia U17	6	(0)
2025–	Colombia U20	2	(0)
- * Club domestic league appearances and goals as of 18:03, 8 December 2025 (UTC) ‡ National team caps and goals as of 18:03, 8 December 2025 (UTC)

Brayan Mateo Caicedo Ramos (born 14 August 2006) is a Colombian professional footballer who plays as a winger for Liga Portugal 2 club Porto B.

== Club career ==
Born in Tumaco in the Nariño Department of Colombia, Caicedo began his career with local side Comfamiliar, before passing through another amateur team, Gambeta, and then professional side Bogotá. He later joined the academy of Cali-based Cyclones, where his performances earned him a call-up to the Colombian under-17 side.

In late June 2023, it was reported that Caicedo would join Portuguese side Porto, but only after spending two years with Leones in Colombia, as he was not yet eighteen. On 11 October 2023, he was named by English newspaper The Guardian as one of the best players born in 2006 worldwide. On 23 August 2024, he signed a five-year contract with Porto, initially joining the club's reserve team, competing in Liga Portugal 2.

== International career ==
Caicedo was first called up to the Colombian under-17 side in 2022, playing in two friendlies against Ecuador. His performances with the side, including four games at the 2023 South American U-17 Championship, reportedly caught the attention of more than twenty teams internationally, according to journalist Pipe Sierra.

== Career statistics ==
=== Club ===
As of match played 6 December 2025

Appearances and goals by club, season and competition
Club	Season	League			National cup		Continental		Other		Total	
Club	Season	Division	Apps	Goals	Apps	Goals	Apps	Goals	Apps	Goals	Apps	Goals
Itagüí Leones	2023	Categoría Primera B	3	0	0	0	—		—		3	0
Itagüí Leones	2024	Categoría Primera B	5	0	0	0	—		—		5	0
Itagüí Leones	Total		8	0	0	0	—		—		8	0
Porto B	2024–25	Liga Portugal 2	11	1	—		—		—		11	1
Porto B	2025–26	Liga Portugal 2	10	2	—		—		—		10	2
Porto B	Total		21	3	0	0	—		—		21	3
Career total			29	3	0	0	0	0	0	0	29	3
