= Copa Ecuador =

Football tournament in Ecuador

Copa FEF Ecuador
- Organiser(s): FEF
- Founded: 1970; Reinstated in 2018
- Region: Ecuador
- Teams: 48
- Qualifier for: Copa Libertadores; Supercopa Ecuador
- Current champions: Universidad Católica (1st title)
- Most championships: El Nacional (2 titles)
- Website: FEF
- 2026 Copa Ecuador

The Copa Ecuador, officially known as Copa FEF Ecuador, is a knockout football competition in men's domestic Ecuadorian football organized by the Ecuadorian Football Federation that started in 1970 and was reinstated in 2018.

The winners qualify for the first stage of the following year's Copa Libertadores and the Supercopa Ecuador against the Serie A champions.

== Background ==
In 1970, the Ecuadorian Football Association (nowadays known as the Ecuadorian Football Federation or FEF), organized a tournament named Copa Ecuador to choose a representative for the 1970 Copa Ganadores de Copa. This first edition was expected to be contested by the clubs placing from fourth to eighth in the previous league championship, however only three clubs participated: Barcelona, El Nacional, and Everest, who had placed third, fourth and eighth in the previous season. After drawing with Barcelona and defeating Everest, and with both teams declining to play their final match, El Nacional won the competition and took part in the Copa Ganadores de Copa.

The reinstatement of the Copa Ecuador was approved by the FEF on 18 May 2018, considering that the governing body would stop organizing the first and second tier championships starting from 2019 and that it was needed to both expand the scope of Ecuadorian football to more places within the country and generate new economic resources for the FEF and the lower tiers of domestic football, represented by the provincial associations.

== Format ==
For its first edition in 2019, the competition involved 48 teams and was divided into seven rounds. The first round was played by 22 teams from the provincial associations and 2 amateur teams, which were drawn into 12 two-legged ties. The 12 winners qualified for the second round, where they were drawn into six two-legged ties, with the winners advancing to the round of 32.

In the round of 32, the 6 winners from the previous round were joined by the 16 Serie A and 10 Serie B teams, who played in 16 two-legged ties with the winners advancing to the round of 16, from where the competition advanced to the quarter-finals, semi-finals, and final.

For 2021, the FEF prepared a change of format with the competition having a preliminary stage involving the 10 Serie B teams and the 22 provincial champions, which would be drawn into 16 double-legged ties with the winners joining the 16 Serie A teams at the round of 32. However, this format had to be implemented starting from 2022 as the 2021 edition was cancelled due to the effects of the COVID-19 pandemic.

== Results ==
| Ed. | Season | Champions | Score | Runners-up | Venue |
|---|---|---|---|---|---|
| 1 | 1970 | El Nacional (1) | Round-robin tournament | Barcelona | |
| – | 1971–2018 | Not held | | | |
| 2 | 2019 | LDU Quito (a) (1) | 2–0 1–3 | Delfín | Estadio Rodrigo Paz Delgado, Quito; Estadio Jocay, Manta |
| – | 2020–2021 | Cancelled due to the COVID-19 pandemic | | | |
| 3 | 2022 | Independiente del Valle (1) | 3–1 | 9 de Octubre | Estadio Olímpico Atahualpa, Quito |
| – | 2023 | Not held | | | |
| 4 | 2024 | El Nacional (2) | 1–0 | Independiente del Valle | Estadio Rodrigo Paz Delgado, Quito |
| 5 | 2025 | Universidad Católica (1) | 3–2 | LDU Quito | Estadio Olímpico Atahualpa, Quito |
| 6 | 2026 | | | | |

== Performance by club ==
| Club | Titles | Runners-up | Seasons won | Seasons runner-up |
|---|---|---|---|---|
| El Nacional | 2 | 0 | 1970, 2024 | — |
| Independiente del Valle | 1 | 1 | 2022 | 2024 |
| LDU Quito | 1 | 1 | 2019 | 2025 |
| Universidad Católica | 1 | 0 | 2025 | — |
| Barcelona | 0 | 1 | — | 1970 |
| Delfín | 0 | 1 | — | 2019 |
| 9 de Octubre | 0 | 1 | — | 2022 |
