= 2021 Supercopa Ecuador =

Supercopa Pilsener 2021

Tournament details
- Host country: Ecuador
- Cities: Guayaquil; Quito
- Dates: 19–26 June 2021
- Teams: 6

Final positions
- Champions: LDU Quito (2nd title)
- Runners-up: Barcelona

Tournament statistics
- Matches played: 5
- Goals scored: 18 (3.6 per match)

The 2021 Supercopa Ecuador (named as Supercopa Pilsener 2021 for sponsorship purposes) was the second edition of the Supercopa Ecuador, Ecuador's football super cup. It was originally scheduled to be held from 4 to 10 February 2021 in the cities of Guayaquil and Quito, with four teams participating. It would be the first edition of the competition to feature said number of teams, under a change of format.

On 3 February 2021, the Ecuadorian Football Federation (FEF) confirmed that the competition was suspended and rescheduled to the second semester of the year due to an outbreak of COVID-19 in one of the involved teams, with the new dates to be confirmed. On 5 June 2021, a further expansion of the tournament to six teams as well as the new schedule for the competition were confirmed, starting on 19 June and ending with the final on 26 June 2021.

LDU Quito won their second title in the competition by beating Barcelona in the final by a 1–0 score.

== Format ==
On 8 January 2021, the FEF confirmed that the Supercopa Ecuador would be held in 2021, while also announcing a format change for this edition. Given that the 2020 Copa Ecuador was cancelled due to the COVID-19 pandemic, the FEF announced an expansion of the tournament to four teams. The four teams would play in two single-legged semi-finals, with the winners playing in the final and the losers playing for third place. In addition to Barcelona and LDU Quito as the most recent Serie A and Supercopa Ecuador champions, respectively, Independiente del Valle and Emelec were also invited to play this edition of the competition on account of their recent achievements: the former by winning the 2019 Copa Sudamericana and the latter by being the last team to win the Serie A three times in a row, from 2013 to 2015.

On 5 June 2021, after the new dates for the competition became known, an additional format change was confirmed with the competition expanding to six teams, starting with a four-team preliminary round and with the remaining two teams receiving byes to the semi-finals.

== Teams ==
Originally Barcelona were invited to participate as the 2020 Ecuadorian Serie A champions, however, on 20 January 2021 the club declined its participation in the competition to avoid a potential conflict with one of its sponsors. On 22 January 2021, the Ecuadorian Football Federation confirmed that 2020 Ecuadorian Serie B champions 9 de Octubre would take Barcelona's place in the competition. With the confirmation of the new dates and format for the competition, Barcelona were once again included and Delfín were also invited as the 2019 Ecuadorian Serie A champions.

Team	Qualification	Previous appearances (bold indicates winners)
Barcelona	2020 Ecuadorian Serie A champions	None
LDU Quito	2020 Supercopa Ecuador champions	1 (**2020**)
Independiente del Valle	2019 Copa Sudamericana champions	None
Emelec	2013, 2014, and 2015 Ecuadorian Serie A champions	None
9 de Octubre	2020 Ecuadorian Serie B champions	None
Delfín	2019 Ecuadorian Serie A champions	1 (2020)

== Matches ==
=== Bracket ===
Preliminary round
9 de Octubre	2
Emelec	0
Independiente del Valle	3
Delfín	5

Semi-finals
Barcelona	1
9 de Octubre	0
LDU Quito	4
Delfín	2

Final
Barcelona	0
LDU Quito	1

=== Preliminary round ===
19 June 2021
16:00

Independiente del Valle	3–5	Delfín
Landázuri 22', 58'; García 50'	Report	Susvielles 6'; Piris 34'; Corozo 59'; Burbano 78'; Alman 88'

Estadio Olímpico Atahualpa, Quito
Attendance: 0 (Note: All matches of the competition were played behind closed doors due to the COVID-19 pandemic in Ecuador.)
Referee: Henry Arízaga

19 June 2021
19:00

9 de Octubre	2–0	Emelec
Vega 26' (o.g.); Luna 73'	Report

Estadio Christian Benítez Betancourt, Guayaquil
Attendance: 0
Referee: Mario Romero

=== Semi-finals ===
22 June 2021
17:00

LDU Quito	4–2	Delfín
Arce 2', 64'; Amarilla 72', 90+4'	Report	Burbano 82'; Piris 90'

Estadio Olímpico Atahualpa, Quito
Attendance: 0
Referee: Alex Cajas

22 June 2021
20:00

Barcelona	1–0	9 de Octubre
Garcés 70' (pen.)	Report

Estadio Christian Benítez Betancourt, Guayaquil
Attendance: 0
Referee: Marlon Vera

=== Final ===
26 June 2021
15:00

Barcelona	0–1	LDU Quito
	Report	Br. Caicedo 4' (o.g.)

Estadio Banco Guayaquil, Quito
Attendance: 0
Referee: Roberto Sánchez
