= Supercopa Ecuador =

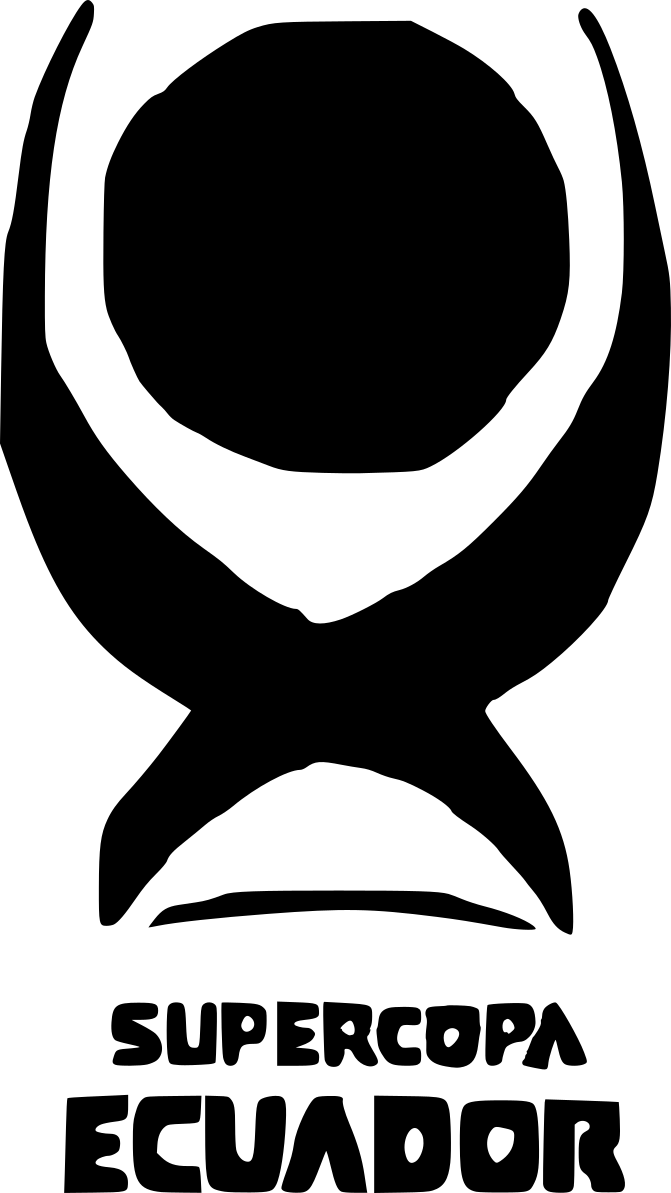
- Founded: 2019
- Region: Ecuador
- Teams: 2
- Current champions: Independiente del Valle (2nd title)
- Most championships: LDU Quito (3 titles)
- Website: FEF website
- 2026 Supercopa Ecuador

The Supercopa Ecuador (Ecuador Supercup) is an annual one-match football official competition in Ecuador organised by the Ecuadorian Football Federation (FEF) to be played by the champions of the Ecuadorian Serie A and the Copa Ecuador of the previous season, starting from 2020. This competition serves as the season curtain-raiser and is scheduled to be played in late January or early February each year, one week before the start of the season.

== History ==
With the transfer of organizing rights for the Ecuadorian Serie A and Serie B from FEF to the LigaPro as well as the creation of the Copa Ecuador in 2018, on 4 July 2019 the FEF decided to approve the creation of a supercup competition to be played by the champions of both the Serie A and the Copa Ecuador a week prior to the start of each league season, starting from 2020. On 31 October 2019, the first Supercopa Ecuador edition was confirmed to be played by the league and cup champions of the 2019 season, taking place on 1 February 2020 at a neutral ground.

For its 2021 edition and given that the 2020 Copa Ecuador was cancelled due to the COVID-19 pandemic, the FEF announced an expansion of the tournament to four teams, which would play in two single-leg semi-final matches and a final between the semi-final winners in the cities of Guayaquil and Quito. In addition to the most recent Serie A and Supercopa Ecuador champions, Independiente del Valle and Emelec were invited to play that edition of the competition on account of their recent achievements. The 2021 edition was later expanded to six teams, with two teams getting a bye to the semi-finals. The competition reverted to its original format for its following edition in 2023, since the Copa Ecuador was played in the previous year.

== Participating clubs ==
The Supercopa Ecuador is played between:

- The Serie A champions
- The Copa Ecuador champions

In the event the same club wins both the league and the domestic cup, its rival in the Supercopa will be the Copa Ecuador runner-up.

== Competition format ==
- One 90-minute game at a neutral venue
- If tied, a penalty shoot-out decides the winner

== Finals ==
Ed.	Season	Champions	Score	Runners-up	Venue
1	2020	LDU Quito (1)	1–1 (5–4 p)	Delfín	Estadio Christian Benítez Betancourt, Guayaquil
2	2021	LDU Quito (2)	1–0	Barcelona	Estadio Banco Guayaquil, Quito
—	2022	Not held			
3	2023	Independiente del Valle (1)	3–0	Aucas	Estadio La Cocha, Latacunga
—	2024	Not held			
4	2025	LDU Quito (3)	0–0 (5–4 p)	El Nacional	Estadio Gonzalo Pozo Ripalda, Quito
5	2026	Independiente del Valle (2)	3–0	Universidad Católica	Estadio Gonzalo Pozo Ripalda, Quito

== Performance by club ==
Club	Winners	Runners-up	Winning years	Runners-up years
LDU Quito	3	—	2020, 2021, 2025	—
Independiente del Valle	2	—	2023, 2026	—
Delfín	—	1	—	2020
Barcelona	—	1	—	2021
Aucas	—	1	—	2023
El Nacional	—	1	—	2025
Universidad Católica	—	1	—	2026
