= 2022 Barcelona Sporting Club season =

Ecuadorian football club season

Barcelona SC
2022 season
- President: Carlos Alfaro Moreno
- Head Coach: Fabián Bustos (until 25 February) Jorge Célico (from 27 February until 4 September) Fabián Bustos (from 5 September)
- Stadium: Monumental Banco Pichincha
- Liga Pro First Stage: 1st
- Liga Pro Second Stage: 8th
- Liga Pro Finals: Runners Up
- Copa Ecuador: Round of 32
- Copa Libertadores: 3rd qualifying phase
- Copa Sudamericana: Group stage
- Top goalscorer: League: Gabriel Cortez & Jhon Cifuente (7); All: Gonzalo Mastriani (9)
Home colours	Away colours	Third colours

The 2022 season was the 97th season in the existence of Barcelona Sporting Club, and the 64th season in the top flight of Ecuadorian football. Barcelona was involved in four competitions: the main national tournament Liga Pro, the national cup called Copa Ecuador, and two international tournaments: Copa Libertadores and Copa Sudamericana.

This season is the third one with Carlos Alfaro Moreno as president of the club. Fabián Bustos started the season as coach but departed to replace Fábio Carille at Santos FC at which point he was replaced by Jorge Célico. After a poor run of form in the season's second stage, Bustos returned to replaced Célico.

== Competitions ==
=== LigaPro Serie A ===
==== First stage ====
===== Standings =====
Pos	Team	Pld	W	D	L	GF	GA	GD	Pts	Qualification
1	Barcelona	15	9	3	3	24	11	+13	30	Advance to Finals and qualification for Copa Libertadores group stage
2	Universidad Católica	15	9	2	4	31	17	+14	29	
3	LDU Quito	15	9	2	4	26	22	+4	29	
4	Independiente del Valle	15	8	3	4	16	12	+4	27	
5	Aucas	15	7	5	3	23	17	+6	26	

Source: LigaPro, Soccerway
Rules for classification: 1) Points, 2) Goal difference, 3) Goals for, 4) Away goals for, 5) Head-to-head record, 6) Drawing of lots.

===== Results summary =====
Overall								Home						Away					
Pld	W	D	L	GF	GA	GD	Pts	W	D	L	GF	GA	GD	W	D	L	GF	GA	GD
15	9	3	3	24	11	+13	30	4	2	1	11	3	+8	5	1	2	13	8	+5

===== Results by round =====
Round	1	2	3	4	5	6	7	8	9	10	11	12	13	14	15
Ground	A	H	A	H	A	A	H	A	H	A	H	A	H	A	H
Result	W	W	W	W	D	W	W	L	L	W	D	W	D	L	W
Position	5	2	1	1	1	1	1	1	1	1	1	1	1	1	1

Source: Competitive matches
A = Away; H = Home; W = Win; D = Draw; L = Loss

===== Matches =====
February 19 Round 1	Delfín	0 - 1	Barcelona	Manta
20:00 UTC−05:00		Report	Preciado 90'	Stadium: Estadio Jocay; Referee: Carlos Orbe

February 26 Round 2	Barcelona	1 - 0	Técnico Universitario	Guayaquil
20:00 UTC−05:00	Mastriani 90+1'	Report		Stadium: Estadio Monumental; Referee: René Marín

March 5 Round 3	9 de Octubre	1 - 2	Barcelona	Guayaquil
20:00 UTC−05:00	Luna 45+7' (pen.)	Report	Cortez 1', 45' (pen.); Garcés 36'	Stadium: Estadio Modelo; Referee: Carlos Orbe

March 12 Round 4	Barcelona	2 - 0	Independiente del Valle	Guayaquil
20:00 UTC−05:00	Cortez 5', 71'	Report		Stadium: Estadio Monumental; Referee: Guillermo Guerrero

March 19 Round 5	Mushuc Runa	1 - 1	Barcelona	Ambato
20:00 UTC−05:00	Giordana 29'	Report	Cortez 20'	Stadium: Estadio Bellavista; Referee: Luis Quiroz

April 2 Round 6	Universidad Católica	1 - 2	Barcelona	Quito
20:00 UTC−05:00	Williams Cevallos (yellow card) 40'; Martínez (yellow card) 43'; Gregori Anangonó (yellow card) 58'; Martínez 71'	Report	Mastriani 16'; Díaz (yellow card) 23'; Quiñónez 36'; Piñatares (yellow card) 38'; Castillo (yellow card) 40'; Sosa (yellow card) 43'; Cortez (yellow card) 90+5'	Stadium: Estadio Olímpico Atahualpa; Referee: (Ecuador) Carlos Orbe

April 10 Round 7	Barcelona	2 - 0	Orense	Guayaquil
19:00 UTC−05:00	Cortez 14' (yellow card) 15' (goal) 73'; Nixon Molina (yellow card) 26'; Carcelén (yellow card) 49'	Report	Achilier (yellow card) 12'; Segundo Portocarrero (yellow card) 63'; Kouffati (yellow card) 75'	Stadium: Estadio Monumental; Referee: (Ecuador) Guillermo Guerrero

April 17 Round 8	L.D.U. Quito	2 - 0	Barcelona	Quito
19:00 UTC−05:00	Alvarado 17' (yellow card) 65'; Caicedo (yellow card) 32'; Hoyos (yellow card) 74'; Piovi (yellow card) 83'; Guerra 86'; Falcón (yellow card) 88'	Report	Nixon Molina (yellow card) 24'; Piñatares (yellow card) 43'; Carcelén (yellow card) 66' (yellow-red card) 70'; Cortez (yellow card) 88'; Velasco (yellow card) 90+6'	Stadium: La Casa Blanca; Referee: (Ecuador) Augusto Aragón

April 20 Round 9	Barcelona	0 - 1	Gualaceo	Guayaquil
21:00 UTC−05:00	Quiñónez (yellow card) 73'; Nixon Molina (yellow card) 90'; Penilla (yellow card) 90+3'	Report	Herlin Lino (yellow card) 24'; Joaquín Vergés 42'; Jorge Gongora (yellow card) 49'	Stadium: Estadio Monumental; Referee: (Ecuador) Carlos Orbe

April 24 Round 10	Macará	0 - 1	Barcelona	Ambato
20:30 UTC−05:00	Álvaro Cazula (yellow card) 32'; Kevin Peralta (yellow card) 38'; Felipe Mejía (yellow card) 43'; Jean Peña (yellow card) 45+4'; Carlos Espinoza (yellow card) 81'; Luis Arce (yellow card) 81'; Fernando Mora (red card) 88'	Report	Carcelén (yellow card) 24'; Perlaza 47'; Garcés (yellow card) 71'; Quiñónez (yellow card) 88'	Stadium: Estadio Bellavista; Referee: (Ecuador) Augusto Aragón

May 8 Round 12	Guayaquil City	1 - 4	Barcelona	Guayaquil
20:00 UTC−05:00	Jean Humanante (red card) 25'; César 69'	Report	Mastriani 30' 49' (pen.) 62'; Nixon Molina 76'	Stadium: Estadio Christian Benítez Betancourt; Referee: (Ecuador) Roddy Zambrano

May 11 Round 11	Barcelona	1 - 1	Emelec	Guayaquil
21:00 UTC−05:00	Martínez (yellow card) 13'; Castillo (yellow card) 79'; Díaz (yellow card) 80'; Carcelén 89'; Rodríguez (yellow card) 89'	Report	Arroyo (yellow card) 10'; Rodríguez (yellow card) 30'; Rojas (yellow card) 66'; Zapata 81'; Cabeza (yellow card) 89'	Stadium: Estadio Monumental; Referee: (Ecuador) Guillermo Guerrero

May 15 Round 13	Barcelona	1 - 1	Deportivo Cuenca	Guayaquil
19:00 UTC−05:00	Martínez (yellow card) 52'; Leonai 55'	Report	Bruno Duarte (yellow card) 4'; Vilinton Branda 90+3'	Stadium: Estadio Monumental; Referee: (Ecuador) Augusto Aragón

May 22 Round 14	Aucas	2 - 1	Barcelona	Quito
20:00 UTC−05:00	Figueroa 16'; Fydriszewski 45+4' (pen.); Edison Caicedo (yellow card) 49'; Romero (yellow card) 89'	Report	Mastriani (yellow card) 28'; Piñatares (yellow card) 45+14'; Díaz 53' (pen.) (yellow card) 66'; Pedro Velasco (yellow card) 90+4'	Stadium: Estadio Gonzalo Pozo R. Referee: (Ecuador) Luis Quiroz

May 29 Round 15	Barcelona	4 - 0	Cumbayá	Guayaquil
19:00 UTC−05:00	Díaz 31' (pen.); Perlaza (yellow card) 33'; Castillo (yellow card) 37'; Rodríguez 41'; Mastriani 59' (pen.); Martínez 84' (pen.)	Report	Bryan Ramírez (yellow card) 16'; Arce (yellow card) 43'; Darío Bone (yellow card) 58'; Jorge Pucheta (yellow card) 82'; Rommel Tapia (yellow card) 82'; Edison Hernández (yellow card) 87'	Stadium: Estadio Monumental; Referee: (Ecuador) Roddy Zambrano

==== Second stage ====
===== Standings =====
Pos	Team	Pld	W	D	L	GF	GA	GD	Pts
6	Deportivo Cuenca	15	6	4	5	18	16	+2	22
7	Técnico Universitario	15	6	4	5	20	20	0	22
8	Barcelona	15	5	6	4	24	19	+5	21
9	Delfín	15	5	4	6	17	19	−2	19
10	Orense	15	4	6	5	16	17	−1	18

Source: LigaPro
Rules for classification: 1) Points, 2) Goal difference, 3) Goals for, 4) Away goals for, 5) Head-to-head record, 6) Drawing of lots.

===== Results summary =====
Overall								Home						Away					
Pld	W	D	L	GF	GA	GD	Pts	W	D	L	GF	GA	GD	W	D	L	GF	GA	GD
15	5	6	4	24	19	+5	21	2	4	2	13	11	+2	3	2	2	11	8	+3

===== Results by round =====
Round	1	2	3	4	5	6	7	8	9	10	11	12	13	14	15
Ground	H	A	H	A	H	H	A	H	A	H	A	H	A	H	A
Result	L	W	D	D	W	D	W	D	L	W	W	D	L	L	D
Position	10	8	7	8	5	7	6	6	7	6	5	5	7	7	8

Source: Competitive matches
A = Away; H = Home; W = Win; D = Draw; L = Loss

===== Matches =====
July 10 Round 1	Barcelona	0 – 1	Delfín	Guayaquil
20:00 UTC−05:00	Aimar (yellow card) 63'; Velasco (yellow card) 71'	Report	Andy Burbano (yellow card) 21'; Queiroz (yellow card) 43'; Luis Caicedo (yellow card) 43'; Chicaiza 66' (yellow card) 67'; Betancourt (yellow card) 72'; John Santacruz (yellow card) 78'	Stadium: Estadio Monumental; Referee: (Ecuador) Carlos Ore

July 16 Round 2	Técnico Universitario	0 – 2	Barcelona	Ambato
21:00 UTC−05:00	Stiven Tapiero (yellow card) 41'; Alejandro Villalva (yellow card) 45+2'; Edison Carcelén (yellow card) 90+1'; Enson Rodríguez (yellow card) 90+2'	Report	Martínez 7'; Aimar (red card) 24'; Leonai (yellow card) 40'; Burrai (yellow card) 72'; Quiñónez (yellow card) 80'; Carcelén 90+3' (pen.)	Stadium: Estadio Bellavista; Referee: (Ecuador) Roberto Sánchez

24 July Round 3	Barcelona	2 – 2	9 de Octubre	Guayaquil
20:00 UTC−05:00	Martínez 21'; Burrai (yellow card) 25'; Quiñónez (yellow card) 45+4' (red card) 90+13'; Piñatares (yellow card) 45+6'; Díaz 87' (pen.)	Report	Cortez 27' (pen.) 45+5' (pen.); Manuel Lucas (yellow card) 47'; Kevin Becerra (yellow card) 56'; Ruben Escobar (yellow card) 62'; Renny Jaramillo (yellow card) 86'	Stadium: Estadio Monumental; Referee: (Ecuador) Roddy Zambrano

30 July Round 4	Independiente del Valle	1 – 1	Barcelona	Sangolquí
21:00 UTC−05:00	Bauman (yellow card) 10'; Sornoza 37'; Faravelli (yellow card) 42'; Segovia (yellow card) 90+5'	Report	Cifuente (yellow card) 14' (goal) 39'; Piñatares (yellow card) 21'; Martínez (yellow card) 56'; Velasco (yellow card) 90+7'	Stadium: Estadio Banco Guayaquil; Referee: (Ecuador) Luis Quiroz

7 August Round 5	Barcelona	4 – 1	Mushuc Runa	Guayaquil
20:00 UTC−05:00	Martínez 24' 40' (yellow card) 41'; Rodríguez 51'; Cifuente 55'; Carcelén (yellow card) 58'	Report	Colombino (yellow card) 1' (goal) 34'; David Villalba (yellow card) 5'; Darwin Quilumba (yellow card) 20'; Carabalí (yellow card) 86'	Stadium: Estadio Monumental; Referee: (Ecuador) Gabriel González

13 August Round 6	Barcelona	0 – 0	Universidad Católica	Guayaquil
21:00 UTC−05:00	Martínez (yellow card) 45'; Adonis Preciado (yellow card) 60'; Allen Obando (yellow card) 83'	Report	Gregori Anangonó (yellow card) 45+1'; Williams Cevallos (yellow card) 64'	Stadium: Estadio Monumental; Referee: (Ecuador) Franklin Congo

20 August Round 7	Orense	1 – 2	Barcelona	Machala
16:00 UTC−05:00	José Miguel Andrade 37' (yellow card) 73'; Rojas (yellow card) 68'	Report	Sosa (yellow card) 45+4'; Piñatares (yellow card) 52'; Díaz (yellow card) 62' (goal) 83' (pen.); Cifuente 90' (yellow card) 90+2'	Stadium: Estadio 9 de Mayo; Referee: (Ecuador) René Marín

28 August Round 8	Barcelona	1-1	L.D.U. Quito	Guayaquil
19:00 UTC−05:00	Rodríguez 4'	Report	Hoyos 85'	Stadium: Estadio Monumental; Referee: Augusto Aragón

3 September Round 9	Gualaceo	2-1	Barcelona	Azogues
19:00 UTC−05:00	Quintero 45+7' (pen.); Ávila 90+1'	Report	Cifuente 89'	Stadium: Estadio Jorge Andrade; Referee: Roberto Sánchez

10 September Round 10	Barcelona	5-3	Macará	Guayaquil
19:00 UTC−05:00	Cifuente 12'; Díaz 25' (pen.); Mora 55' (o.g.); Carcelén 76'; Penilla 82'	Report	Mina 29', 34', 89' (pen.)	Stadium: Estadio Monumental; Referee: Jaime Sánchez

19 September Round 11	Emelec	1-3	Barcelona	Guayaquil
		Report		Stadium: Estadio George Capwell

2 October Round 12	Barcelona	1-1	Guayaquil City	Guayaquil
		Report		Stadium: Estadio Monumental

8 October Round 13	Deportivo Cuenca	2-1	Barcelona	Cuenca
		Report		Stadium: Estadio Alejandro Serrano Aguilar

16 October Round 14	Barcelona	0-2	Aucas	Guayaquil
TBA UTC−05:00		Report		Stadium: Estadio Monumental

22 October Round 15	Cumbayá	1-1	Barcelona	Quito
	Mina 67' (o.g.)	Report	Penilla 51' (pen.)	Stadium: Estadio Olímpico Atahualpa

==== Final stage ====
Barcelona met second-stage winners Aucas in the season-long Serie A final which was played over two legs.

6 November First leg	Barcelona	0-1	Aucas	Guayaquil
15:00 UTC−5	Carcelén (yellow card) 69'; Díaz (yellow card) 76'; Sosa (red card) 84'	Report	Mina (yellow card) 42' (yellow-red card) 77'; Vega 65'; Fara (yellow card) 81'; Romero (yellow card) 90+1'	Stadium: Estadio Monumental

13 November Second leg	Aucas	0-0 (1–0 agg.)	Barcelona	Quito
17:00 UTC−5	Caicedo (yellow card) 19'; Quiñonez (yellow card) 54'; Ordóñez (yellow card) 68'; López (yellow card) 74'; Frascarelli (yellow card) 77'; Romero (yellow card) 78'	Report	Carcelén (yellow card) 23'; Piñatares (yellow card) 80'; Velasco (yellow card) 90+1'	Stadium: Estadio Gonzalo Pozo Ripalda

Aucas won 1–0 on aggregate.

=== Copa Ecuador ===
2 July 2022 Round of 32	El Nacional	2-1	Barcelona	Quito
18:00 UTC−5	Nazareno 12'; Solís 26'	Report	N. Molina 33'	Stadium: Olímpico Atahualpa; Referee: Roberto Sánchez
Note: Match originally scheduled for 18 June 2022, 18:00 local time, but suspended and rescheduled due to social unrest in Ecuador.

=== Copa Libertadores ===
==== First qualifying stage ====
8 February 2022	Montevideo City Torque (Uruguay)	1–1	(Ecuador) Barcelona	Montevideo
21:30 UTC−3	Zeballos 64'	Report	Mastriani 7'	Stadium: Estadio Centenario; Attendance: 2,000; Referee: Darío Herrera (Argentina)

15 February 2022	Barcelona (Ecuador)	0–0 (1–1 agg.) (8–7 p)	(Uruguay) Montevideo City Torque	Guayaquil
19:30 UTC−5		Report		Stadium: Estadio Monumental; Referee: Anderson Daronco (Brazil)
	Penalties
	Garcés (penalty scored); Perlaza (penalty scored); B. Castillo (penalty scored); Martínez (penalty scored); Piñatares (penalty scored); Preciado (penalty scored); E. Castillo (penalty scored); Leonai (penalty scored)		(penalty scored) Cejas; (penalty scored) Peña; (penalty scored) Arismendi; (penalty scored) Siri; (penalty scored) Allende; (penalty scored) Morales; (penalty scored) Guzmán; (penalty missed) Chocobar

Tied 1–1 on aggregate, Barcelona won on penalties and advanced to the second stage (Match C5).

==== Second qualifying stage ====
23 February 2022	Barcelona (Ecuador)	2–0	(Peru) Universitario	Guayaquil
19:30 UTC−5	E. Castillo 60'; Garcés 80'	Report		Stadium: Estadio Monumental; Referee: José Argote (Venezuela)

2 March 2022	Universitario (Peru)	0–1 (0–3 agg.)	(Ecuador) Barcelona	Lima
19:30 UTC−5		Report	Martínez 66'	Stadium: Estadio Nacional; Referee: Andrés Matonte (Uruguay)

Barcelona won 3–0 on aggregate and advanced to the third stage (Match G4).

==== Third qualifying stage ====
8 March 2022	América Mineiro (Brazil)	0–0	(Ecuador) Barcelona	Belo Horizonte
21:30 UTC−3		Report		Stadium: Estádio Independência; Referee: Darío Herrera (Argentina)

15 March 2022	Barcelona (Ecuador)	0–0 (0-0 agg.) (4–5 p)	(Brazil) América Mineiro	Guayaquil
19:30 UTC−5		Report		Stadium: Estadio Monumental; Referee: Patricio Loustau (Argentina) was replaced by Patricio Loustau from Argentina.
	Penalties
	Piñatares (penalty scored); B. Castillo (penalty scored); Martínez (penalty scored); Quiñónez (penalty missed); Díaz (penalty scored)		(penalty scored) Wellington Paulista; (penalty scored) Iago Maidana; (penalty scored) Felipe Azevedo; (penalty scored) Ramírez; (penalty scored) Juninho Valoura

Tied 0–0 on aggregate, América Mineiro won on penalties and advanced to the group stage.

=== Copa Sudamericana ===
==== Group stage (Group A) ====
Barcelona transferred to the Copa Sudamericana group stage after their elimination from the Copa Libertadores in the third qualifying round. The draw for the group stage was held on 25 March 2022, 12:00 PYST (UTC−4), at the CONMEBOL Convention Centre in Luque, Paraguay.

Pos	Team	Pld	W	D	L	GF	GA	GD	Pts	Qualification
1	(Argentina) Lanús	6	3	2	1	7	4	+3	11	Round of 16
2	(Ecuador) Barcelona	6	2	3	1	9	8	+1	9	
3	(Uruguay) Montevideo Wanderers	6	2	2	2	6	7	−1	8	
4	(Venezuela) Metropolitanos	6	0	3	3	3	6	−3	3	

Source: CONMEBOL

7 April Matchday 1	Barcelona (Ecuador)	4-2	(Uruguay) Montevideo Wanderers	Guayaquil
19:30 UTC−5	Mastriani 9', 11'; Carcelén 35'; Díaz 54'	Report	Rivero 14'; Méndez 61'	Stadium: Estadio Monumental; Attendance: 12,069; Referee: Mario Díaz de Vivar (Paraguay)

14 April 2022 Matchday 2	Lanús (Argentina)	3–1	(Ecuador) Barcelona	Lanús
21:30 UTC−3	Cabral 31'; Sand 74'; Bernabei 82'	Report	Rodríguez 77'	Stadium: Estadio Ciudad de Lanús; Attendance: 3,592; Referee: Bruno Arleu (Brazil)

28 April 2022 Matchday 3	Barcelona (Ecuador)	1–0	(Venezuela) Metropolitanos	Guayaquil
19:30 UTC−5	Molina 33'	Report		Stadium: Estadio Monumental Isidro Romero Carbo, Referee: Anderson Daronco (Brazil)

4 May 2022 Matchday 4	Barcelona (Ecuador)	1–1	(Argentina) Lanús	Guayaquil
19:30 UTC−5	Sand 41' (o.g.)	Report	Sand 53'	Stadium: Estadio Monumental Isidro Romero Carbo, Referee: Piero Maza (Chile)

19 May 2022 Matchday 5	Metropolitanos (Venezuela)	2–2	(Ecuador) Barcelona	Caracas
20:30 UTC−4	Gómez 35'; Antón 78'	Report	Díaz 45+4' (pen.); Garcés 52'	Stadium: Estadio Olímpico de la UCV; Referee: Rodolpho Toski (Brazil)

25 May 2022 Matchday 6	Montevideo Wanderers (Uruguay)	0–0	(Ecuador) Barcelona	Montevideo
19:15 UTC−3		Report		Stadium: Estadio Centenario; Referee: Wagner Magalhães (Brazil)

== Statistics ==
=== Goalscorers ===
Rank	Player	League	International Cups	Total
1	(Uruguay) Gonzalo Mastriani	6	3	9
2	(Ecuador) Jhon Cifuente	7	0	7
	(Ecuador) Gabriel Cortez	7	0	7
	(Ecuador) Damián Díaz	5	2	7
5	(Ecuador) Fidel Martínez	5	0	5
6	(Uruguay) Carlos Rodríguez	3	1	4
	(Ecuador) Michael Carcelén	3	1	4
8	(Ecuador) Carlos Garcés	1	2	3
9	(Ecuador) Cristian Penilla	2	0	2
	(Argentina) Emmanuel Martínez	1	1	2
	(Ecuador) Eryc Castillo	1	1	2
	(Ecuador) Nixon Molina	1	1	2
13	(Ecuador) Adonis Preciado	1	0	1
	(Ecuador) Jonathan Perlaza	1	0	1
	(Ecuador) Joshué Quiñónez	1	0	1
	(Ecuador) Pedro Velasco	1	0	1
	(Brazil) Leonai	1	0	1
**	Own Goals	1	1	2
	Team Totals	48	13	61
