= 2021 Barcelona Sporting Club season =

Ecuadorian football club season

Barcelona SC
2021 season
- President: Carlos Alfaro Moreno
- Head Coach: Fabián Bustos
- Stadium: Monumental Banco Pichincha
- Liga Pro First Stage: 2nd
- Liga Pro Second Stage: 9th
- Copa Ecuador: Cancelled
- Supercopa Ecuador: Runners-up
- Copa Libertadores: Semi-finals
- Top goalscorer: League: Gonzalo Mastriani (8); All: Carlos Garcés, Damián Díaz & Gonzalo Mastriani (9 each)
Home colours	Away colours	Third colours

The 2021 season was the 96th season in the existence of Barcelona Sporting Club, and the 63rd season in the top flight of Ecuadorian football. Barcelona was involved in three primary competitions: the main national tournament Liga Pro, the national cup called Copa Ecuador, and the international tournament Copa Libertadores.

The season was the second with Carlos Alfaro Moreno as president of the club. Barcelona's coach was Fabián Bustos. While the club failed to achieve domestic success, they did reach the semi-final stage of the Copa Libertadores for the fifth time in club history and the first time since 2017. They also contested the final of the Supercopa Ecuador.

== Competitions ==
=== Liga Pro ===
==== First stage ====
===== Stage table =====
Pos	Team	Pld	W	D	L	GF	GA	GD	Pts	Qualification
1	Emelec	15	10	4	1	29	14	+15	34	Advance to Finals and qualification for Copa Libertadores group stage
2	Barcelona	15	9	4	2	31	13	+18	31	
3	Independiente del Valle	15	8	3	4	27	18	+9	27	
4	Universidad Católica	15	7	4	4	29	18	+11	25	
5	Mushuc Runa	15	7	4	4	29	21	+8	25	

Source: LigaPro, Soccerway
Rules for classification: 1) Points, 2) Goal difference, 3) Goals for, 4) Away goals for, 5) Head-to-head record, 6) Drawing of lots.

===== Results summary =====
Overall								Home						Away					
Pld	W	D	L	GF	GA	GD	Pts	W	D	L	GF	GA	GD	W	D	L	GF	GA	GD
12	8	3	1	27	10	+17	27	5	1	0	16	3	+13	3	2	1	11	7	+4

Last updated: 17 May 2021.
Source: LigaPro, Soccerway

===== Results by round =====
Round	1	2	3	4	5	6	7	8	9	10	11	12	13	14	15
Ground	A	H	A	H	A	H	A	H	A	H	H	A	H	A	H
Result	W	W	W	W	D	D	L	W	D	W		W	W	L	
Position	7	2	1	1	1	1	1	1	2	2		2	2	2	

Updated to match(es) played on 16 May 2021. Source: LigaPro, Soccerway
A = Away; H = Home; W = Win; D = Draw; L = Loss

===== Matches =====
20 February 2021 1	Manta	2 − 3	Barcelona	Manta
19:00 UTC−5	Angulo 11'; Alaniz 27' (pen.)	Report	Cortez 64'; Riveros 82'; Oyola 85'	Stadium: Estadio Jocay; Referee: Augusto Aragón

28 February 2021 2	Barcelona	3 − 0	Técnico Universitario	Guayaquil
19:30 ECT	Díaz 3'; Castillo 76'; López 90+1'	Report		Stadium: Monumental Banco Pichincha; Referee: Franklin Congo

7 March 2021 3	Guayaquil City	0 − 3	Barcelona	Guayaquil
17:15 UTC−5	Castillo 27'; Garcés 45+2'; Molina 89'	Report		Stadium: Los Samanes; Referee: Guillermo Guerrero

14 March 2021 4	Barcelona	2 − 0	Orense	Guayaquil
19:30 UTC−5	Díaz 27' (pen.); Garcés 45+1'	Report		Stadium: Monumental Banco Pichincha; Referee: René Marín

20 March 2021 5	LDU Quito	2 − 2	Barcelona	Quito
17:15 UTC−5				Stadium: La Casa Blanca; Referee: Luis Quiroz

3 April 2021 6	Barcelona	2 − 2	Independiente del Valle	Guayaquil
19:30 ECT				Stadium: Monumental Banco Pichincha; Referee: Augusto Aragón

8 April 2021 7	Deportivo Cuenca	1 − 0	Barcelona	Cuenca
17:15 UTC−5				Stadium: Estadio Banco del Austro; Referee: Guillermo Guerrero

12 April 2021 8	Barcelona	3 − 0	Aucas	Guayaquil
19:30 ECT				Stadium: Monumental Banco Pichincha; Referee: Alex Cajas

16 April 2021 9	Mushuc Runa	2 − 2	Barcelona	Ambato
17:15 UTC−5				Stadium: COAC Mushuc Runa; Referee: Juan Andrade

1 May 2021 10	Barcelona	2 − 1	Delfín	Guayaquil
19:30 ECT				Stadium: Monumental Banco Pichincha; Referee: Mario Romero

16 May 2021 12	9 de Octubre	0 − 1	Barcelona	Guayaquil
19:00 ECT			Díaz 48' (pen.)	Stadium: Modelo; Referee: Roberto Sánchez

23 May 2021 13	Barcelona	4 − 0	Olmedo	Guayaquil
??:00 ECT	Carcelén 28'; López 60'; Riveros 85'; Martínez 90+2'	Report		Stadium: Monumental Banco Pichincha; Referee: Jaime Sánchez

30 May 2021 14	Universidad Católica	2 − 0	Barcelona	Quito
??:00 ECT	Cevallos 26'; Carabalí 59'	Report		Stadium: Olímpico Atahualpa; Referee: Diego Lara

10 June 2021 11	Barcelona	1 − 1	Emelec	Guayaquil
17:15 UTC−5				Stadium: Monumental Banco Pichincha

18 July 2021 15	Barcelona	3 − 0	Macará	Guayaquil
??:00 ECT				Stadium: Monumental Banco Pichincha

==== Second stage ====
===== Stage table =====
Pos	Team	Pld	W	D	L	GF	GA	GD	Pts
7	Técnico Universitario	15	5	7	3	13	9	+4	22
8	Aucas	15	5	5	5	20	17	+3	20
9	Barcelona	15	6	2	7	20	20	0	20
10	Guayaquil City	15	6	2	7	16	18	−2	20
11	Orense	15	4	7	4	14	13	+1	19

Source: LigaPro, Soccerway
Rules for classification: 1) Points, 2) Goal difference, 3) Goals for, 4) Away goals for, 5) Head-to-head record, 6) Drawing of lots.

===== Matches =====
25 July 2021 1	Barcelona	2 — 0	Manta	Guayaquil
??:00 UTC−5				Stadium: Monumental Banco Pichincha

1 August 2021 2	Técnico Universitario	1 — 2	Barcelona	Ambato
??:00 UTC−5				Stadium: Bellavista

8 August 2021 3	Barcelona	2 — 1	Guayaquil City	Guayaquil
??:00 UTC−5				Stadium: Monumental Banco Pichincha

15 August 2021 4	Orense	1 — 0	Barcelona	Machala
??:00 UTC−5				Stadium: 9 de Mayo

22 August 2021 5	Barcelona	0 — 2	LDU Quito	Guayaquil
??:00 UTC−5				Stadium: Monumental Banco Pichincha

29 August 2021 6	Independiente del Valle	1 — 0	Barcelona	Sangolquí
??:00 UTC−5				Stadium: Banco Guayaquil

12 September 2021 7	Barcelona	3 — 2	Deportivo Cuenca	Guayaquil
??:00 UTC−5				Stadium: Monumental Banco Pichincha

19 September 2021 8	Aucas	1 — 0	Barcelona	Quito
??:00 UTC−5				Stadium: Gonzalo Pozo Ripalda

26 September 2021 9	Barcelona	4 — 0	Mushuc Runa	Guayaquil
??:00 UTC−5				Stadium: Monumental Banco Pichincha

3 October 2021 10	Delfín	4 — 1	Barcelona	Manta
??:00 UTC−5				Stadium: Jocay

17 October 2021 11	Emelec	2 — 1	Barcelona	Guayaquil
??:00 UTC−5				Stadium: Banco del Pacífico Capwell

24 October 2021 12	Barcelona	1 — 3	9 de Octubre	Guayaquil
??:00 UTC−5				Stadium: Monumental Banco Pichincha

31 October 2021 13	Olmedo	0 — 2	Barcelona	Riobamba
??:00 UTC−5				Stadium: Olímpico

7 November 2021 14	Barcelona	1 — 1	Universidad Católica	Guayaquil
??:00 UTC−5				Stadium: Monumental Banco Pichincha

21 November 2021 15	Macará	1 — 1	Barcelona	Ambato
??:00 UTC−5				Stadium: Bellavista

=== Copa Ecuador ===
The 2021 Copa Ecuador was cancelled due to logistical issues surrounding the ongoing impacts of the COVID-19 pandemic in Ecuador.

=== Supercopa Ecuador ===
On 8 January 2021, FEF announced a February date and a four-team format for the Supercopa Ecuador to account for the cancellation of the 2020 Copa Ecuador. On 20 January 2021, Barcelona declined its participation in the competition to avoid a potential conflict with one of its sponsors.

After numerous delays, the FEF announced a late-June date for the tournament on 5 June 2021. FEF further modified the format of the tournament to include six-teams, with Barcelona returning to the draw. As reigning champions of Ecuador, Barcelona were given a bye to the semi-final stage.

22 June 2021 Semi-finals	Barcelona	1-0	9 de Octubre	Guayaquil
20:00 UTC−5	Garcés 70' (pen.)	Report		Stadium: Estadio Christian Benítez Betancourt; Attendance: 0 Referee: Marlon Vera

26 June 2021 Final	Barcelona	0-1	LDU Quito	Quito
15:00 UTC−5		Report	Br. Caicedo 4' (o.g.)	Stadium: Estadio Banco Guayaquil; Attendance: 0 Referee: Roberto Sánchez

=== Copa Libertadores ===
==== Group stage (Group C) ====
Pos	Team	Pld	W	D	L	GF	GA	GD	Pts	Qualification	BSC	BOC	SAN	STR
1	(Ecuador) Barcelona	6	4	1	1	10	3	+7	13	Round of 16	—	1–0	3–1	4–0
2	(Argentina) Boca Juniors	6	3	1	2	6	2	+4	10	Round of 16	0–0	—	2–0	3–0
3	(Brazil) Santos	6	2	0	4	8	9	−1	6	Copa Sudamericana	0–2	1–0	—	5–0
4	(Bolivia) The Strongest	6	2	0	4	4	14	−10	6		2–0	0–1	2–1	—

Source: CONMEBOL

20 April 2021 1	Santos (Brazil)	0–2	(Ecuador) Barcelona	São Paulo
17:15 UTC−5		Report	Garcés 53'; Pará 69' (o.g.)	Stadium: Vila Belmiro; Referee: Andrés Matonte (Uruguay)

28 April 2021 2	Barcelona (Ecuador)	4–0	(Bolivia) The Strongest	Guayaquil
21:00 UTC−5	Garcés 46'; Pineida 67'; Martínez 73'; Valverde 86' (o.g.)	Report		Stadium: Estadio Monumental; Referee: Derlis López (Paraguay)

4 May 2021 3	Barcelona (Ecuador)	1–0	(Argentina) Boca Juniors	Guayaquil
19:30 UTC−5	Garcés 62'	Report		Stadium: Estadio Monumental; Referee: Andrés Rojas (Colombia)

11 May 2021 4	The Strongest (Bolivia)	2–0	(Ecuador) Barcelona	La Paz
17:15 UTC−5	Reinoso 45+1', 65'	Report		Stadium: Estadio Hernando Siles; Referee: Ángel Arteaga (Venezuela)

20 May 2021 5	Boca Juniors (Argentina)	0–0	(Ecuador) Barcelona	Buenos Aires
19:00 UTC−5		Report		Stadium: La Bombonera

26 May 2021 6	Barcelona (Ecuador)	3–1	(Brazil) Santos	Guayaquil
19:00 UTC−5	Díaz 15', 54'; Montaño 77'	Report	Kaio Jorge 45+2'	Stadium: Estadio Monumental

=== Final stages ===
==== Round of 16 ====
13 July 2021 First leg	Vélez Sarsfield (Argentina)	1–0	(Ecuador) Barcelona	Buenos Aires
19:15 UTC−3	Lucero 7'	Report		Stadium: José Amalfitani; Attendance: 0 Referee: Raphael Claus (Brazil)

21 July 2021 Second leg	Barcelona (Ecuador)	3–1 (3–2 agg.)	(Argentina) Vélez Sarsfield	Guayaquil
17:15 UTC−5	Preciado 24'; Cortez 69' (pen.); Perlaza 80'	Report	Lucero 48'	Stadium: Estadio Monumental; Attendance: 0 Referee: Piero Maza (Chile)

Barcelona won 3–2 on aggregate and advanced to the quarter-finals.

==== Quarter-finals ====
12 August 2021 First leg	Fluminense (Brazil)	2–2	(Ecuador) Barcelona	Rio de Janeiro
21:30 UTC−3	Teixeira 26'; Fred 90+5' (pen.)	Report	Preciado 69'; Cortez 88' (pen.)	Stadium: Estádio do Maracanã; Attendance: 0 Referee: Alexis Herrera (Venezuela)

19 August 2021 Second leg	Barcelona (Ecuador)	1–1 (3a–3 agg.)	(Brazil) Fluminense	Guayaquil
19:30 UTC−5	Mastriani 73'	Report	Fred 90+8' (pen.)	Stadium: Estadio Monumental Isidro Romero Carbo; Attendance: 0 Referee: Esteban Ostojich (Uruguay)

Tied 3–3 on aggregate. Barcelona advanced to the semi-finals via the away goals rule.

==== Semi-finals ====
22 September 2021 First leg	Flamengo (Brazil)	2–0	(Ecuador) Barcelona	Rio de Janeiro
: UTC−3				Stadium: Estádio do Maracanã

29 September 2021 Second leg	Barcelona (Ecuador)	0–2 (0-4 agg.)	(Brazil) Flamengo	Guayaquil
: UTC−5				Stadium: Estadio Monumental Isidro Romero Carbo

Flamengo won 4–0 on aggregate and advanced to the final.

== Statistics ==
=== Goalscorers ===
Rank	Player	League	Domestic Cups	International Cups	Total
1	(Uruguay) Gonzalo Mastriani	8	0	1	9
	(Ecuador) Damián Díaz	7	0	2	9
	(Ecuador) Carlos Garcés	5	1	3	9
4	(Argentina) Emmanuel Martínez	7	0	1	8
5	(Argentina) Sergio López	6	0	0	6
6	(Ecuador) Gabriel Cortez	3	0	2	5
7	(Ecuador) Byron Castillo	3	0	0	3
8	(Paraguay) Williams Riveros	2	0	0	2
	(Argentina) Michael Hoyos	2	0	0	2
	(Ecuador) Joshué Quiñónez	2	0	0	2
	(Ecuador) Adonis Preciado	0	0	2	2
12	(Ecuador) Nixon Molina	1	0	0	1
	(Ecuador) Matías Oyola	1	0	0	1
	(Ecuador) Michael Carcelén	1	0	0	1
	(Ecuador) Mario Pineida	0	0	1	1
	(Ecuador) Carlos Montaño	0	0	1	1
	(Ecuador) Jonathan Perlaza	0	0	1	1
**	Own Goals	0	0	2	2
	Team Totals	48	1	16	65
