= 2020 Barcelona Sporting Club season =

Ecuadorian football club season

Barcelona SC
2020 season
- President: Carlos Alfaro Moreno
- Head Coach: Fabián Bustos
- Stadium: Monumental Banco Pichincha
- Liga Pro First Stage: 4th
- Liga Pro Second Stage: 1st
- Liga Pro Finals: Champions
- Copa Ecuador: Cancelled
- C. Libertadores: Group stage
- Top goalscorer: League: Damián Díaz (10); All: Damián Díaz (12)
Home colours	Away colours	Third colours

The 2020 season was Barcelona Sporting Club's 95th season in existence and the club's 62nd season in the top flight of Ecuadorian football. Barcelona was involved in two competitions: the main national tournament Liga Pro, and the international tournament Copa Libertadores. The national cup called Copa Ecuador was cancelled due to the COVID-19 pandemic in Ecuador.

2020 season was the first one with Carlos Alfaro Moreno as president of the club. In 2019 season, Barcelona had three different coaches, but on 17 December 2019 the club hires the Argentinean coach Fabián Bustos.

Barcelona participated in the 2020 Copa Libertadores. They began their participation from the first qualifying stage, a key they won 5-1 on aggregate against Progreso. In the second qualifying stage they beat Sporting Cristal 5-2 on aggregate. In the third qualifying phase they won 5-0 on aggregate to Cerro Porteño. However, in the group stage, Barcelona played in Group A, obtaining 5 defeats and only 1 victory, finishing last in the table and being eliminated from the tournament.

Barcelona was one of the sixteen teams disputing the 2020 Liga Pro. Barcelona finished the First stage in fourth place, but they won the Second stage, qualifying to the Finals. In the Finals, Barcelona and LDU Quito disputed the championship in round-trip matches. In the first leg, both teams tie 1-1. In the second leg, there was another tie 0-0. Barcelona won on penalties.

== Season overview ==
=== January ===
- Barcelona played their annual traditional friendly match called Noche Amarilla (the "Yellow Night"), in which they presented their season squad. In this friendly match, the retired Italian player Alessandro del Piero played as a special guest. The rival was Delfín SC. The match ended with a 0–1 score in favor of the visiting team.

== Goalscorers ==
No.	Pos.	Nation	Name	App.	Liga Pro	Copa Ecuador	Copa Libertadores	Total
11	FW	(Ecuador)	Fidel Martínez	-	3	-	8	11
10	MF	(Argentina)	Damián Díaz	-	8	-	2	10
8	FW	(Argentina)	Leandro Emmanuel Martínez	-	4	-	3	7
9	FW	(Paraguay)	Cristian Colmán	-	4	-	1	5
44/9	FW	(Uruguay)	Jonathan Álvez	-	2	-	2	4
21	FW	(Ecuador)	José Angulo	-	3	-	-	3
13	FW	(Ecuador)	Ely Esterilla	-	2	-	-	2
14	DF	(Ecuador)	Darío Aimar	-	2	-	-	2
20	MF	(Uruguay)	Bruno Piñatares	-	2	-	-	2
23	DF	(Ecuador)	Pedro Pablo Velasco	-	1	-	1	2
26	DF	(Ecuador)	Byron Castillo	-	1	-	1	2
5	DF	(Brazil)	Gabriel Marques	-	-	-	1	1
7	MF	(Ecuador)	Michael Arroyo	-	1	-	-	1
19	MF	(Ecuador)	Nixon Molina	-	1	-	-	1
77	MF	(Ecuador)	Adonis Preciado	-	1	-	-	1
3	MF	(Paraguay)	William Riveros	-	1	-	-	1

== Pre-season and friendlies ==
Win Draw Loss Fixtures

== Competitions ==
=== Overview ===
Competition	First match	Last match	Starting round	Final position	Record							
Competition	First match	Last match	Starting round	Final position	Pld	W	D	L	GF	GA	GD	Win %
LigaPro	16 February 2020	29 December 2020	First stage - Matchday 1	Champions	32	16	12	4	47	22	+25	50.00
Copa Ecuador	Tournament canceled								—			
Copa Libertadores	22 January 2020	21 October 2020	First qualifying stage	Group stage	12	6	0	6	19	15	+4	50.00
Total					44	22	12	10	66	37	+29	50.00

Last updated: 29 December 2020
Source: Soccerway

=== Liga Pro ===
==== First stage ====
===== Standings =====
Pos	Team	Pld	W	D	L	GF	GA	GD	Pts	Qualification
1	LDU Quito	15	11	2	2	29	13	+16	35	Advance to Finals and qualification for Copa Libertadores group stage
2	Independiente del Valle	15	9	5	1	36	22	+14	32	
3	Universidad Católica	15	9	4	2	32	14	+18	31	
4	Barcelona	15	8	5	2	23	13	+10	29	
5	Macará	15	6	6	3	22	17	+5	24	
6	Aucas	15	7	2	6	26	23	+3	23	
7	Técnico Universitario	15	6	4	5	17	16	+1	22	

Source: LigaPro, Soccerway
Rules for classification: 1) Points, 2) Goal difference, 3) Goals for, 4) Away goals for, 5) Head-to-head record, 6) Drawing of lots.

===== Results summary =====
Overall								Home						Away					
Pld	W	D	L	GF	GA	GD	Pts	W	D	L	GF	GA	GD	W	D	L	GF	GA	GD
15	8	5	2	23	13	+10	29	5	3	0	12	5	+7	3	2	2	11	8	+3

Last updated: 19 November 2020.
Source: Liga Pro

===== Results by round =====
Round	1	2	3	4	5	6	7	8	9	10	11	12	13	14	15
Ground	H	A	H	A	H	A	H	A	H	H	A	H	A	A	H
Result	D	W	D	L	W	W	W	L	W	W	W	D	W	D	D
Position	5	5	5	5	5	4	2	4	4	4	3	3	4	4	4

Updated to match(es) played on 15 August 2020. Source: LigaPro
A = Away; H = Home; W = Win; D = Draw; L = Loss

===== Matches =====
16 February 2020 Match 1	Barcelona	0 - 0	Técnico Universitario	Guayaquil
16:45	Anthony Bedoya (yellow card) 9' (yellow-red card) 64'	Summary	Edwin Méndez (yellow card) 35'; Eddie Guevara (yellow card) 72'; Juan David Jiménez (yellow card) 75'	Stadium: Estadio Monumental Banco Pichincha; Referee: (Ecuador) Carlos Orbe

22 February 2020 Match 2	Delfín	1 - 2	Barcelona	Manta
14:30	Janner Corozo (yellow card) 18'; Richard Calderón (yellow card) 45+2' (yellow-red card) 82'; Garcés 52' (pen.); Cangá (yellow card) 74' (yellow-red card) 77'; Ale (yellow card) 76'	Summary	Aimar (yellow card) 1'; Jean Carlos Montaño (yellow card) 7'; Sergio Quintero (yellow card) 45'; Esterilla 60' 69'; Bolaños (yellow card) 74'	Stadium: Estadio Jocay; Referee: (Ecuador) Marlon Vera

28 February 2020 Match 3	Barcelona	1 - 1	LDU Portoviejo	Guayaquil
18:00	Gustavo Vallecilla (yellow card) 29'; Esterilla (yellow card) 45+1'; Sergio Quintero (yellow card) 48'; Aimar 56'; Byron Castillo (yellow card) 69'; Éder Cetré (yellow card) 89'	Summary	Luna (yellow card) 32'; Hurtado (yellow card) 49'; Barreiro 66'; Robertino Insúa (yellow card) 73'; Quiñónez (yellow card) 77'	Stadium: Estadio Monumental Banco Pichincha; Referee: (Ecuador) Gabriel González

7 March 2020 Match 4	LDU Quito	2 - 1	Barcelona	Quito
18:00	Cristian Borja 28'; Franklin Guerra (yellow card) 47'; Lucas Villarruel (yellow card) 82'; Franklin Guerra 90+1'	Summary	Fidel Martínez 61'; Christian Alemán (penalty missed); Damián Díaz (yellow card) 90'	Stadium: Estadio Rodrigo Paz Delgado; Referee: (Ecuador) Franklin Congo

14 August 2020 Match 5	Barcelona	1 - 0	Orense	Guayaquil
19:15	José Angulo 76'; Willian Riveros (yellow card) 90+4'	Summary	Ronaldo Johnson (yellow card) 71'; Daniel Angulo (yellow card) 76'	Stadium: Estadio Monumental Banco Pichincha; Referee: (Ecuador) Augusto Aragón

18 August 2020 Match 6	D. Cuenca	0 - 3	Barcelona	Cuenca
17:00	Pedro Larrea (yellow card) 47'; Ivan Piedra (yellow card) 55'; Sergio Ojeda (yellow card) 62'	Report	Nixon Molina (yellow card) 23'; Bruno Piñatares 26'; Fidel Martínez 56' (pen.); Gabriel Marques (yellow card) 71'; Bruno Piñatares (yellow card) 78'; Jonathan Álvez 90+1'	Stadium: Estadio Alejandro Serrano Aguilar; Referee: (Ecuador) Marlon Vera

23 August 2020 Match 7	Barcelona	2 - 1	Emelec	Guayaquil
18:30	G. Marques (yellow card) 33'; F. Martínez 83'; C. Colmán 90+4'		M. Hernandez (yellow card) 31'; A. Leguizamón (yellow card) 45+2'; J. Rojas (yellow card) 54'; R. Ordóñez 66'	Stadium: Estadio Monumental Banco Pichincha; Referee: (Ecuador) Guillermo Guerrero

26 August 2020 Match 8	Guayaquil City	2 - 1	Barcelona	Guayaquil
19:00	Miguel Parrales 23'; Ariel Chávez 42'		José Enrique Angulo 63'	Stadium: Estadio Christian Benítez Betancourt; Referee: (Ecuador) Mario Romero

29 August 2020 Match 9	Barcelona	3 - 1	Olmedo	Guayaquil
17:30	Damián Díaz 45'; Darío Aimar 47'; Cristian Colmán 89'		Gorman Estacio 50'	Stadium: Estadio Monumental Banco Pichincha; Referee: (Ecuador) Juan Andrade

1 September 2020 Match 10	Barcelona	4 - 2	Aucas	Guayaquil
19:00	Emmanuel Martínez 22', 62'; José Enrique Angulo 34'; Michael Arroyo 36'		Luis Miguel Encalada 16'; Jhonny Quiñonez 90+3'	Stadium: Estadio Monumental Banco Pichincha; Referee: (Ecuador) René Marín

4 September 2020 Match 11	Mushuc Runa	1 - 2	Barcelona	Ambato
19:00	Ignacio Herrera 85'		Damián Díaz 26' (pen.); Emmanuel Martínez 56'	Stadium: COAC Mushuc Runa; Referee: (Ecuador) Luis Quiroz

9 September 2020 Match 12	Macará	1 - 1	Barcelona	Ambato
19:00	Leonel Quiñónez 90+1'		Damián Díaz 47'	Stadium: Estadio Bellavista; Referee: (Ecuador) Diego Lara

13 September 2020 Match 13	Barcelona	1 - 0	Universidad Católica	Guayaquil
18:00	Damián Díaz 47'			Stadium: Estadio Monumental Banco Pichincha; Referee: (Ecuador) Juan Andrade

26 September 2020 Match 14	Independiente	1 - 1	Barcelona	Sangolquí
19:30	Luis Segovia 6'		Jonathan Álvez 21'	Stadium: Estadio Rumiñahui; Referee: (Ecuador) René Marín

3 October 2020 Match 15	Barcelona	0 - 0	El Nacional	Guayaquil
18:30				Stadium: Estadio Monumental Banco Pichincha; Referee: (Ecuador) Jaime Sánchez

==== Second stage ====
===== Standings =====
Pos	Team	Pld	W	D	L	GF	GA	GD	Pts	Qualification
1	Barcelona	15	8	5	2	22	7	+15	29	Advance to Finals and qualification for Copa Libertadores group stage
2	Emelec	15	8	4	3	28	15	+13	28	
3	Guayaquil City	15	7	5	3	23	17	+6	26	
4	LDU Quito	15	7	3	5	31	20	+11	24	
5	Deportivo Cuenca	15	6	5	4	18	21	−3	23	
6	Independiente del Valle	15	7	1	7	26	21	+5	22	

Source: LigaPro, Soccerway
Rules for classification: 1) Points, 2) Goal difference, 3) Goals for, 4) Away goals for, 5) Head-to-head record, 6) Drawing of lots.

===== Results summary =====
Overall								Home						Away					
Pld	W	D	L	GF	GA	GD	Pts	W	D	L	GF	GA	GD	W	D	L	GF	GA	GD
15	8	5	2	22	7	+15	29	6	1	0	15	2	+13	2	4	2	7	5	+2

Last updated: 2 November 2020.
Source: Liga Pro

===== Results by round =====
Round	1	2	3	4	5	6	7	8	9	10	11	12	13	14	15
Ground	A	H	A	H	A	H	A	H	A	H	A	H	A	H	A
Result	W	W	W	D	L	W	D	W	D	W	D	W	L	W	D
Position	3	1	1	1	3	2	2	1	2	2	2	1	1	1	1

Updated to match(es) played on 29 May 2019. Source: LigaPro
A = Away; H = Home; W = Win; D = Draw; L = Loss

===== Matches =====
14 October 2020 Match 1	Técnico Universitario	0 - 2	Barcelona	Ambato
18:30			Byron Castillo 11'; Damián Díaz 84'	Stadium: Estadio Bellavista; Referee: (Ecuador) Marlon Vera

17 October 2020 Match 2	Barcelona	1 - 0	Delfín	Guayaquil
19:30	Bruno Piñatares 20'; Leandro Emmanuel Martínez (yellow card) 25' (yellow-red card) 90+4'			Stadium: Estadio Monumental Banco Pichincha; Referee: (Ecuador) Augusto Aragón

25 October 2020 Match 3	LDU Portoviejo	0 - 2	Barcelona	Portoviejo
18:00			Mario Pineida (red card) 26'; Pedro Pablo Velasco 30'; Adonis Preciado 39'	Stadium: Estadio Reales Tamarindos; Referee: (Ecuador)

1 November 2020 Match 4	Barcelona	2 - 2	LDU Quito	Guayaquil
18:00	Cristian Cólman 44'; Damián Díaz 54'		Cristian Borja 66'; Jordy Alcívar 75'	Stadium: Estadio Monumental Banco Pichincha; Referee: (Ecuador)

6 November 2020 Match 5	Olmedo	1 - 0	Barcelona	Riobamba
19:00	Joao Paredes 35'			Stadium: Estadio Olímpico de Riobamba; Referee: (Ecuador)

10 November 2020 Match 6	Barcelona	2 - 0	Independiente	Guayaquil
19:00	Damián Díaz 19'; Cristian Cólman 63'			Stadium: Estadio Monumental Banco Pichincha; Referee: (Ecuador)

15 November 2020 Match 7	El Nacional	1 - 1	Barcelona	Quito
19:00	Sixto Mina 26'		Nixon Molina 46'	Stadium: Estadio Olímpico Atahualpa; Referee: (Ecuador)

19 November 2020 Match 8	Barcelona	2 - 0	Deportivo Cuenca	Guayaquil
19:00	Damián Díaz 2'; William Riveros 4'			Stadium: Estadio Monumental Banco Pichincha; Referee: (Ecuador)

23 November 2020 Match 9	Orense	0 - 0	Barcelona	Machala
15:30				Stadium: Estadio 9 de Mayo; Referee: (Ecuador)

29 November 2020 Match 10	Barcelona	3 - 0	Macará	Guayaquil
18:00				Stadium: Estadio Monumental Banco Pichincha; Referee: (Ecuador)

6 December 2020 Match 11	Emelec	1 - 1	Barcelona	Guayaquil
19:00				Stadium: Estadio George Capwell; Referee: (Ecuador)

9 December 2020 Match 12	Barcelona	2 - 0	Guayaquil City	Guayaquil
18:00				Stadium: Estadio Monumental Banco Pichincha; Referee: (Ecuador)

==== Aggregate table ====
Pos	Team	Pld	W	D	L	GF	GA	GD	Pts	Qualification or relegation
1	LDU Quito	30	18	5	7	60	33	+27	59	Qualification for Copa Libertadores group stage
2	Barcelona (C)	30	16	10	4	46	21	+25	58	Qualification for Copa Libertadores group stage
3	Independiente del Valle	30	16	6	8	62	43	+19	54	Qualification for Copa Libertadores second stage
4	Universidad Católica	30	14	9	7	48	28	+20	51	Qualification for Copa Libertadores first stage
5	Emelec	30	12	8	10	48	37	+11	44	Qualification for Copa Sudamericana first stage (Note: Since the 2020 Copa Ecuador was cancelled due to the COVID-19 pandemic in Ecuador, the spot awarded to its champions (Copa Sudamericana first stage) was passed over to the aggregate table fourth best-placed team not qualified for the Copa Libertadores.)

Source: LigaPro
Rules for classification: 1) Points, 2) Goal difference, 3) Goals for, 4) Away goals for, 5) Head-to-head record, 6) Drawing of lots.
(C) Champions

==== Finals ====
December 23 Finals	Barcelona	1–1	LDU Quito	Guayaquil
20:15 UTC−05:00	Álvez 50'; Pineida (yellow card) 67'; Piñatares (yellow card) 72'; Oyola (yellow card) 89'		Julio 45+4'; Alcívar (yellow card) 52'; Sornoza (yellow card) 55'; Martínez (yellow card) 90+6'	Stadium: Estadio Monumental Banco Pichincha; Referee: Augusto Aragón

December 29 Finals	LDU Quito	0–0 (1–3 p)	Barcelona	Quito
20:15 UTC−05:00	Guerra (yellow card) 43'; Julio (yellow card) 63'		Pineida (yellow card) 76'; Piñatares (yellow card) 80'; Velasco (yellow card) 85'; Castillo (yellow card) 90+2'	Stadium: Estadio Rodrigo Paz Delgado; Referee: Guillermo Guerrero
	Penalties
	Alcívar (penalty scored); Guerra (penalty missed); Piovi (penalty missed); Martínez (penalty missed)		(penalty scored) Álvez; (penalty scored) Oyola; (penalty scored) Díaz

Tied 1–1 on aggregate, Barcelona won on penalties and became 2020 Ecuadorian Serie A champions

=== Copa Ecuador ===
2020 Copa Ecuador was cancelled due to the COVID-19 pandemic in Ecuador.

=== Copa Libertadores ===
==== First qualifying stage ====
22 January 2020	Progreso (Uruguay)	0–2	(Ecuador) Barcelona	Montevideo
21:30 UTC−3		Report	F. Martínez 22'; L. Martínez 48'	Stadium: Parque Alfredo Víctor Viera (Note: Progreso played their home match at Parque Alfredo Víctor Viera, Montevideo, instead of their regular stadium Parque Abraham Paladino, Montevideo, which did not meet CONMEBOL requirements.); Referee: Eduardo Gamboa (Chile)

29 January 2020	Barcelona (Ecuador)	3–1 (5–1 agg.)	(Uruguay) Progreso	Guayaquil
19:30 UTC−5	Díaz 13'; F. Martínez 57'; Velasco 73'	Report	Rosso 56'	Stadium: Estadio Monumental Isidro Romero Carbo; Referee: Arnaldo Samaniego (Paraguay)

Barcelona won 5–1 on aggregate and advanced to the second stage (Match C8).

==== Second qualifying stage ====
6 February 2020	Barcelona (Ecuador)	4–0	(Peru) Sporting Cristal	Guayaquil
19:30 UTC−5	F. Martínez 6', 50'; Marques 13'; Álvez 82' (pen.)	Report		Stadium: Estadio Monumental Isidro Romero Carbo; Referee: Cristian Garay (Chile)

13 February 2020	Sporting Cristal (Peru)	2–1 (2–5 agg.)	(Ecuador) Barcelona	Lima
19:30 UTC−5	Sandoval 80'; Olivares 90+3' (pen.)	Report	F. Martínez 68'	Stadium: Estadio Nacional (Note: Sporting Cristal played their home match at Estadio Nacional, Lima, instead of their regular stadium Estadio Alberto Gallardo, Lima, which did not meet CONMEBOL requirements.); Referee: Wilton Sampaio (Brazil)

Barcelona won 5–2 on aggregate and advanced to the third stage (Match G1).

==== Third qualifying stage ====
19 February 2020	Barcelona (Ecuador)	1–0	(Paraguay) Cerro Porteño	Guayaquil
19:30 UTC−5	F. Martínez 25'	Report		Stadium: Estadio Monumental Isidro Romero Carbo; Referee: Gustavo Tejera (Uruguay)

26 February 2020	Cerro Porteño (Paraguay)	0–4 (0–5 agg.)	(Ecuador) Barcelona	Asunción
19:15 UTC−3		Report	L. Martínez 34'; F. Martínez 66', 82'; Díaz 73'	Stadium: Estadio General Pablo Rojas; Referee: Anderson Daronco (Brazil)

Barcelona won 5–0 on aggregate and advanced to the group stage (Group A).

==== Group stage (Group A) ====
Pos	Team	Pld	W	D	L	GF	GA	GD	Pts	Qualification	FLA	IDV	JUN	BSC
1	(Brazil) Flamengo	6	5	0	1	14	8	+6	15	Round of 16	—	4–0	3–1	3–0
2	(Ecuador) Independiente del Valle	6	4	0	2	14	8	+6	12	Round of 16	5–0	—	3–0	2–0
3	(Colombia) Junior	6	2	0	4	8	12	−4	6	Copa Sudamericana	1–2	4–1	—	0–2
4	(Ecuador) Barcelona	6	1	0	5	4	12	−8	3		1–2	0–3	1–2	—

Source: CONMEBOL

4 March 2020	Barcelona (Ecuador)	0–3	(Ecuador) Independiente	Guayaquil
17:15 UTC−5		Report	Torres 55'; Ortiz 87'; Pellerano 90+5' (pen.)	Stadium: Estadio Monumental Isidro Romero Carbo; Referee: Roberto Tobar (Chile)

11 March 2020	Flamengo (Brazil)	3–0	(Ecuador) Barcelona	Rio de Janeiro
21:30 UTC−3	Gustavo Henrique 39'; Gabriel Barbosa 45' (pen.); Bruno Henrique 53'	Report		Stadium: Estádio do Maracanã; Referee: Facundo Tello (Argentina)

17 September 2020	Barcelona (Ecuador)	1–2	(Colombia) Junior	Guayaquil
21:00 UTC−5	Colmán 28'	Report	Viera 7'; Borja 70'	Stadium: Estadio Monumental Isidro Romero Carbo; Attendance: 0 Referee: Kevin Ortega (Peru)

22 September 2020	Barcelona (Ecuador)	1–2	(Brazil) Flamengo	Guayaquil
17:15 UTC−5	L. Martínez 48'	Report	Pedro 6'; De Arrascaeta 26'	Stadium: Estadio Monumental Isidro Romero Carbo; Attendance: 0 Referee: Diego Haro (Peru)

30 September 2020	Junior (Colombia)	0–2	(Ecuador) Barcelona	Barranquilla
19:30 UTC−5		Report	Castillo 45'; Álvez 46'	Stadium: Estadio Metropolitano Roberto Meléndez; Attendance: 0 Referee: Alexis Herrera (Venezuela)

21 October 2020	Independiente (Ecuador)	2–0	(Ecuador) Barcelona	Quito
19:30 UTC−5	Ortiz 24'; Torres 60'	Report		Stadium: Estadio Olímpico Atahualpa (Note: Independiente del Valle play their home matches against Junior and Barcelona at Estadio Olímpico Atahualpa, Quito, and will play their home match against Flamengo at Estadio Gonzalo Pozo Ripalda, Quito, instead of their regular stadium Estadio Rumiñahui, Sangolquí which does not meet CONMEBOL requirements.); Attendance: 0 Referee: Luis Quiroz (Ecuador)
