= Burrai =

Burrai may refer to:

- Javier Burrai (born 1990), Ecuador international footballer
- Salvatore Burrai (born 1987), Italian footballer
