= Bruno Piñatares =

Uruguayan footballer (born 1990)

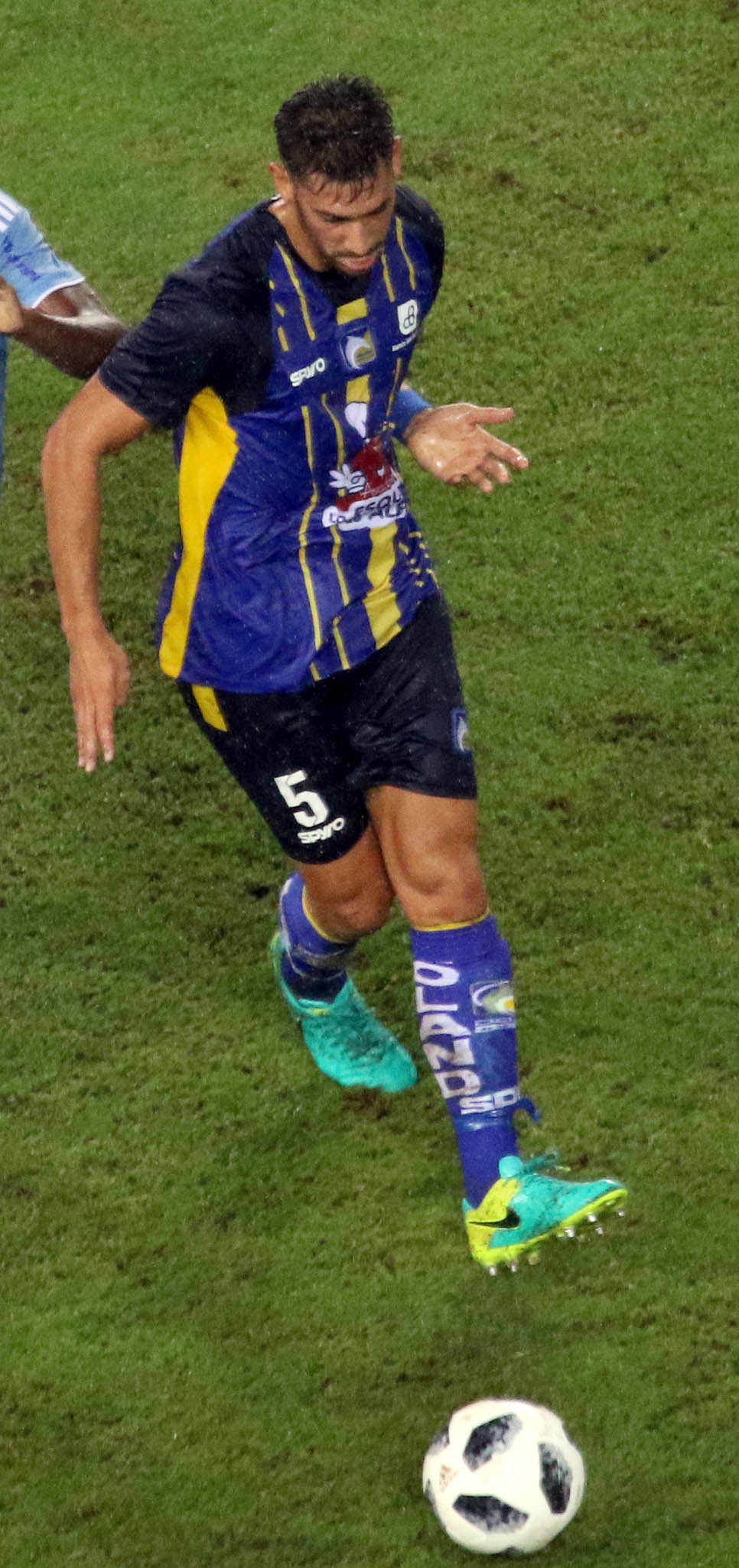
- Piñatares with Delfín in 2018

Personal information
- Full name: Bruno Piñatares Prieto
- Date of birth: 25 June 1990 (age 36)
- Place of birth: Montevideo, Uruguay
- Height: 1.83 m (6 ft 0 in)
- Position: Defensive midfielder

Team information
- Current team: Guaraní
- Number: 21

Youth career
- Dryco
- Nacional
- Rentistas

Senior career*
| Years | Team | Apps | (Gls) |
| 2007–2010 | Rentistas | 29 | (2) |
| 2010–2013 | Boston River | 57 | (3) |
| 2013–2014 | Rentistas | 19 | (2) |
| 2014–2015 | Portuguesa | 18 | (0) |
| 2015–2016 | Cerro | 26 | (0) |
| 2016–2017 | Western Sydney Wanderers | 19 | (0) |
| 2017 | River Plate Montevideo | 14 | (0) |
| 2018–2019 | Delfín | 71 | (5) |
| 2020–2023 | Barcelona SC | 101 | (2) |
| 2024– | Guaraní | 23 | (0) |

International career
| 2005 | Uruguay U15 | | |
- * Club domestic league appearances and goals as of 12 August 2025

Bruno Piñatares Prieto (born 25 June 1990) is a Uruguayan professional footballer who plays as a defensive midfielder for Paraguayan club Guaraní.

== Club career ==
=== Early career ===
Born in Montevideo, Piñatares began his career with Baby Fútbol Dryco. He later played for Nacional before joining Rentistas, where he finished his formation.

Piñatares made his first team debut in 2007, at the age of 16; his side was eventually relegated from Primera División at the end of the campaign. He would later feature more regularly in the following years, in Segunda División.

Piñatares moved to fellow second division side Boston River in 2010, being a regular starter. In July 2013, he returned to Rentistas, with the club now back in the top tier.

=== Portuguesa ===
On 11 July 2014, Piñatares moved abroad for the first time in his career, joining Campeonato Brasileiro Série B side Portuguesa. He featured regularly during the 2014 Série B, suffering relegation, but lost his starting spot in the 2015 Campeonato Paulista and subsequently left the club in May 2015.

=== Cerro ===
In June 2015, Piñatares returned to his home country after agreeing to a contract with Cerro in the first division. He was a regular starter as his side qualified for the 2017 Copa Libertadores.

=== Western Sydney Wanderers ===
On 29 June 2016, Piñatares signed for Australian club Western Sydney Wanderers. Unable to establish as a regular starter, he was released on 11 May 2017.

=== River Plate Montevideo ===
In July 2017, Piñatares returned to Uruguay to play for River Plate Montevideo, also in the top tier. An immediate starter, he only missed one match during the season, as his side finished in a mid-table position.

=== Delfín ===
On 2 January 2018, Piñatares moved to Ecuadorian Serie A side Delfín, managed by compatriot Guillermo Sanguinetti. He helped his side to win the league for the first time in their history in the 2019 campaign, also scoring in the semifinals against Macará.

=== Barcelona SC ===
On 3 January 2020, Piñatares was announced at Barcelona also in the Ecuadorian top tier, reuniting with his former Delfín manager Fabián Bustos. He also became a starter for his new side, winning another Serie A title in 2020 and helping his side to reach the semifinals of the 2021 Copa Libertadores.

== Career statistics ==
As of 23 March 2022

Appearances and goals by club, season and competition
| Club | Season | League | | | Cup | | Continental | | State League | | Other | | Total | |
| Club | Season | Division | Apps | Goals | Apps | Goals | Apps | Goals | Apps | Goals | Apps | Goals | Apps | Goals |
|---|---|---|---|---|---|---|---|---|---|---|---|---|---|---|
| Rentistas | 2006–07 | Uruguayan Primera División | 4 | 0 | — | | — | | — | | — | | 4 | 0 |
| Rentistas | 2007–08 | Uruguayan Segunda División | 6 | 0 | — | | — | | — | | — | | 6 | 0 |
| Rentistas | 2008–09 | Uruguayan Segunda División | 19 | 2 | — | | — | | — | | 2 (Note: Appearance(s) in Promotion play-offs) | 0 | 21 | 2 |
| Rentistas | 2009–10 | Uruguayan Segunda División | 0 | 0 | — | | — | | — | | — | | 0 | 0 |
| Rentistas | Total | | 29 | 2 | 0 | 0 | 0 | 0 | — | | 2 | 0 | 31 | 2 |
| Boston River | 2010–11 | Segunda División | 13 | 0 | — | | — | | — | | 4 | 0 | 17 | 0 |
| Boston River | 2011–12 | Segunda División | 22 | 1 | — | | — | | — | | 1 | 0 | 23 | 1 |
| Boston River | 2012–13 | Segunda División | 22 | 2 | — | | — | | — | | 4 | 0 | 26 | 2 |
| Boston River | Total | | 57 | 3 | 0 | 0 | 0 | 0 | 0 | 0 | 9 | 0 | 66 | 3 |
| Rentistas | 2013–14 | Primera División | 19 | 2 | — | | — | | — | | — | | 19 | 2 |
| Portuguesa | 2014 | Série B | 14 | 0 | — | | — | | — | | — | | 14 | 0 |
| Portuguesa | 2015 | Série C | 0 | 0 | 2 | 0 | — | | 4 (Note: Appearance(s) in Campeonato Paulista) | 0 | — | | 6 | 0 |
| Portuguesa | Total | | 14 | 0 | 2 | 0 | 0 | 0 | 4 | 0 | 0 | 0 | 20 | 0 |
| Cerro | 2015–16 | Primera División | 26 | 0 | — | | — | | — | | — | | 26 | 0 |
| Western Sydney Wanderers | 2016–17 | A-League | 19 | 0 | 2 | 0 | 0 | 0 | — | | — | | 21 | 0 |
| River Plate Montevideo | 2017 | Primera División | 14 | 0 | — | | — | | — | | — | | 14 | 0 |
| Delfín | 2018 | Ecuadorian Serie A | 40 | 2 | — | | 6 (Note: Appearance(s) in Copa Libertadores) | 0 | — | | — | | 46 | 2 |
| Delfín | 2019 | Ecuadorian Serie A | 31 | 3 | — | | 0 | 0 | — | | — | | 31 | 3 |
| Delfín | Total | | 71 | 5 | 0 | 0 | 6 | 0 | 0 | 0 | 0 | 0 | 77 | 5 |
| Barcelona | 2020 | Ecuadorian Serie A | 27 | 2 | — | | 11 | 0 | — | | — | | 38 | 2 |
| Barcelona | 2021 | Ecuadorian Serie A | 24 | 0 | — | | 11 | 0 | — | | 1 (Note: Appearance(s) in Supercopa Ecuador) | 0 | 36 | 0 |
| Barcelona | 2022 | Ecuadorian Serie A | 5 | 0 | — | | 5 | 0 | — | | — | | 10 | 0 |
| Barcelona | Total | | 56 | 2 | 0 | 0 | 27 | 0 | 0 | 0 | 1 | 0 | 84 | 2 |
| Career total | | | 305 | 14 | 4 | 0 | 33 | 0 | 4 | 0 | 12 | 0 | 358 | 14 |

== Honours ==
Delfín

- Ecuadorian Serie A: 2019

Barcelona SC

- Ecuadorian Serie A: 2020
