= Emmanuel Martínez (footballer, born 1994) =

Argentine footballer

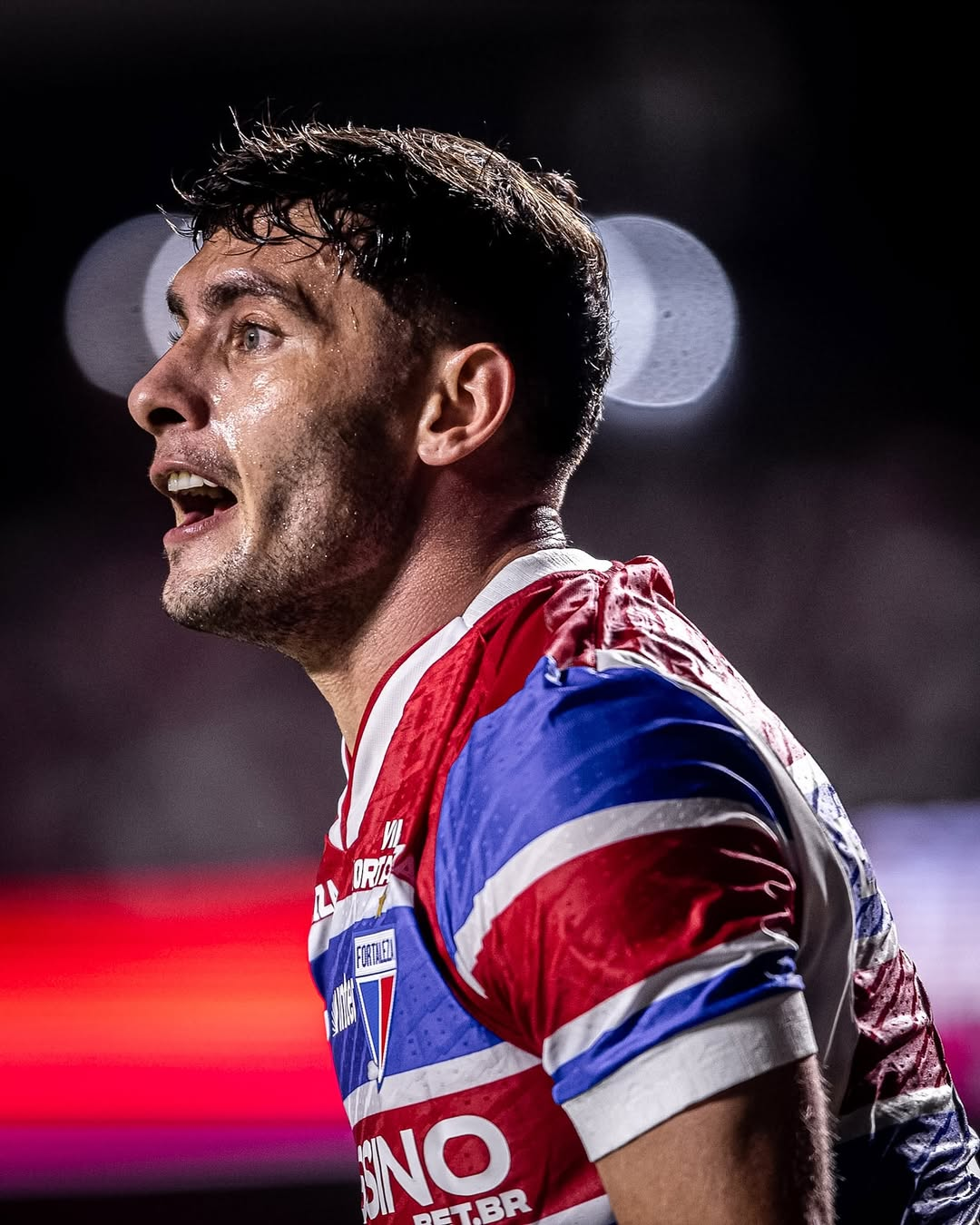

Personal information
- Full name: Leandro Emmanuel Martínez
- Date of birth: 4 June 1994 (age 32)
- Place of birth: Tandil, Argentina
- Height: 1.69 m (5 ft 7 in)
- Position: Midfielder

Team information
- Current team: Vitória
- Number: 6

Youth career
- Unidos la Movediza
- Botafogo de Rauch
- 2007–2014: River Plate

Senior career*
| Years | Team | Apps | (Gls) |
| 2015–2018 | River Plate | 0 | (0) |
| 2015–2017 | → San Martín SJ (loan) | 30 | (3) |
| 2017–2018 | → Chacarita Juniors (loan) | 11 | (1) |
| 2018–2020 | Deportivo Cuenca | 51 | (10) |
| 2020 | → Barcelona SC (loan) | 28 | (3) |
| 2021–2022 | Barcelona SC | 43 | (8) |
| 2022–2024 | América Mineiro | 47 | (1) |
| 2024–2025 | Fortaleza | 40 | (2) |
| 2026– | Vitória | 10 | (1) |
- * Club domestic league appearances and goals as of 8 April 2026

Leandro Emmanuel Martínez (born 4 June 1994) is an Argentine footballer who plays as a midfielder for Brazilian club Vitória.

== Personal life ==
Born in Tandil, Martínez lost his father at the age of just eight due to a lung cancer.

== Club career ==
=== River Plate ===
Martínez was a River Plate youth graduate, having joined their youth setup at the age of 13. He then spent some time with the club's reserve team, scoring in the Superclásico against the reserve side of Boca Juniors in 2014.

==== Loan to San Martín de San Juan ====
On 12 February 2015, Martínez moved to Primera División side San Martín de San Juan on loan for one year. He made his professional debut on 4 May, starting and scoring the winner in a 1–0 away success over Temperley.

On 19 January 2016, Martínez renewed his loan deal with San Martín for a further 18 months. However, he failed to establish himself as a starter for the club, and left in 2017.

==== Loan to Chacarita Juniors ====
On 25 August 2017, Martínez agreed to a one-year loan deal with Chacarita Juniors, also in the top tier. He scored just once in 11 league appearances for the club, as his side suffered relegation.

=== Deportivo Cuenca ===
On 3 July 2018, Martínez moved abroad after being announced at Ecuadorian Serie A side Deportivo Cuenca. He impressed during the 2019 season after providing 14 assists and scoring seven goals.

=== Barcelona SC ===
On 27 December 2019, Martínez was announced as the new signing of Barcelona SC, after agreeing to a one-year loan contract. An immediate starter, he signed a permanent three-year deal with the club on 11 January 2021.

== Career statistics ==
As of 1 March 2023.

| Club | Season | League | | | Cup | | Continental | | State League | | Other | | Total | |
| Club | Season | Division | Apps | Goals | Apps | Goals | Apps | Goals | Apps | Goals | Apps | Goals | Apps | Goals |
|---|---|---|---|---|---|---|---|---|---|---|---|---|---|---|
| San Martín de San Juan | 2015 | Primera División | 15 | 3 | 0 | 0 | — | | — | | — | | 15 | 3 |
| San Martín de San Juan | 2016 | Primera División | 5 | 0 | 0 | 0 | — | | — | | — | | 5 | 0 |
| San Martín de San Juan | 2016–17 | Primera División | 10 | 0 | 0 | 0 | — | | — | | — | | 10 | 0 |
| San Martín de San Juan | Total | | 30 | 3 | 0 | 0 | — | | — | | — | | 30 | 3 |
| Chacarita Juniors | 2017–18 | Primera División | 11 | 1 | 1 | 0 | — | | — | | — | | 12 | 1 |
| Deportivo Cuenca | 2018 | Serie A | 23 | 3 | — | | 4 (Note: Appearance(s) in Copa Sudamericana) | 0 | — | | — | | 27 | 3 |
| Deportivo Cuenca | 2019 | Serie A | 28 | 7 | — | | — | | — | | — | | 28 | 7 |
| Deportivo Cuenca | Total | | 51 | 10 | — | | 4 | 0 | — | | — | | 55 | 10 |
| Barcelona SC | 2020 | Serie A | 28 | 3 | — | | 12 (Note: Appearance(s) in Copa Sudamericana) | 3 | — | | — | | 40 | 6 |
| Barcelona SC | 2021 | Serie A | 28 | 7 | — | | 11 | 1 | — | | 2 (Note: Appearance(s) in Supercopa Ecuador) | 0 | 41 | 8 |
| Barcelona SC | 2022 | Serie A | 15 | 1 | — | | 7 (Note: Six appearances and one goal in Copa Libertadores, one appearance in Copa Sudamericana) | 1 | — | | — | | 22 | 2 |
| Barcelona SC | Total | | 71 | 11 | — | | 30 | 5 | — | | 2 | 0 | 103 | 16 |
| América Mineiro | 2022 | Série A | 4 | 0 | — | | — | | — | | — | | 4 | 0 |
| América Mineiro | 2023 | Série A | 0 | 0 | 0 | 0 | 0 | 0 | 6 (Note: Appearance(s) in Campeonato Mineiro) | 0 | — | | 6 | 0 |
| América Mineiro | Total | | 4 | 0 | 0 | 0 | 0 | 0 | 6 | 0 | — | | 10 | 0 |
| Career total | | | 167 | 25 | 1 | 0 | 34 | 5 | 6 | 0 | 2 | 0 | 210 | 30 |

== Honours ==
Barcelona SC

- Ecuadorian Serie A: 2020
