= Leonai =

Brazilian footballer

Personal information
- Full name: Leonai Souza de Almeida
- Date of birth: 28 April 1995 (age 31)
- Place of birth: Pontal, Brazil
- Height: 1.74 m (5 ft 9 in)
- Position: Midfielder

Youth career
- Olé Brasil

Senior career*
Years	Team	Apps	(Gls)
2016	Jaboticabal	0	(0)
2017	Sete de Dourados	0	(0)
2017	Taquaritinga	16	(1)
2018–2019	Comercial-SP	38	(1)
2020–2024	Plaza Colonia	60	(1)
2022–2023	→ Barcelona SC (loan)	17	(1)
2024–2025	Barcelona SC	63	(0)
2026	Náutico	10	(0)
2026–	Millonarios	0	(0)
- * Club domestic league appearances and goals as of 7 March 2026

Leonai Souza de Almeida (born 28 April 1995), simply known as Leonai, is a Brazilian footballer who plays as a midfielder for Colombian club Millonarios.

== Club career ==
=== Early career ===
Born in Pontal, São Paulo, Leonai played for Olé Brasil as a youth, and made his senior debut with Jaboticabal in 2016, playing for the side in a non-official tournament called Taça Paulista. He was announced by Sete de Dourados in January 2017, but spent only 40 days at the club before leaving. During that period, he also worked as a stock boy in a supermarket and as an assistant in a chemical laboratory.

On 26 April 2017, Leonai joined Taquaritinga. After impressing with the side in the year's Campeonato Paulista Segunda Divisão, he was announced at Comercial-SP on 16 January 2018.

On 17 October 2018, after helping Comercial in their promotion to the Campeonato Paulista Série A3, Leonai renewed his contract until 2020. He scored his first goal for the club the following 6 April, netting the winner in a 1–0 success over Desportivo Brasil.

=== Plaza Colonia ===
On 6 November 2019, Comercial confirmed the transfer of Leonai to Uruguayan club Plaza Colonia. He made his professional – and Primera División – debut on 7 March 2020, coming on as a second-half substitute for Leandro Suhr in a 1–1 home draw against Fénix.

Leonai became a regular starter for the Patas Blancas, and scored his first professional goal on 28 June 2021, netting the opener in a 1–1 home draw against Cerro Largo. At the end of that season, he was chosen as the best foreign player of the tournament by Referí, the football section of newspaper El Observador.

==== Loan to Barcelona SC ====
On 10 January 2022, Ecuadorian Serie A side Barcelona SC announced that Leonai had joined the club on a one-year loan deal, with a buyout clause.

== Career statistics ==
As of 23 March 2022

Club	Season	League			State League		Cup		Continental		Other		Total	
Club	Season	Division	Apps	Goals	Apps	Goals	Apps	Goals	Apps	Goals	Apps	Goals	Apps	Goals
Taquaritinga	2017	Paulista 2ª Divisão	—		16	1	—		—		—		16	1
Comercial-SP	2018	Paulista 2ª Divisão	—		22	0	—		—		—		22	0
Comercial-SP	2019	Paulista A3	—		16	1	—		—		20 (Note: Appearance(s) in Copa Paulista)	0	36	1
Comercial-SP	Total		—		38	1	—		—		20	0	58	1
Plaza Colonia	2020	Primera División	31	0	—		—		3 (Note: Appearance(s) in Copa Sudamericana)	0	—		34	0
Plaza Colonia	2021	Primera División	29	1	—		—		—		—		29	1
Plaza Colonia	Total		60	1	—		—		3	0	—		63	1
Barcelona SC	2022	Serie A	3	0	—		—		5 (Note: Appearance(s) in Copa Libertadores)	0	—		8	0
Career total			63	1	54	2	0	0	8	0	20	0	145	3

== Honours ==
=== Individual ===
- Uruguayan Primera División Team of the season: 2021
