= Gonzalo Mastriani =

Uruguayan footballer (born 1993)

Personal information
- Full name: Gonzalo Mathías Mastriani Borges
- Date of birth: 28 April 1993 (age 33)
- Place of birth: Montevideo, Uruguay
- Height: 1.80 m (5 ft 11 in)
- Position: Forward

Team information
- Current team: América Mineiro (on loan from Athletico Paranaense)
- Number: 17

Youth career
- 2002–2006: Sauce
- 2006–2011: Cerro

Senior career*
Years	Team	Apps	(Gls)
2011–2013	Cerro	40	(14)
2013–2015	Parma	0	(0)
2013–2014	→ Crotone (loan)	5	(0)
2014	→ Gorica (loan)	9	(1)
2014−2015	→ Olhanense (loan)	29	(5)
2015–2016	Rentistas	23	(5)
2016	→ Tampico Madero (loan)	12	(1)
2017	Alebrijes Oaxaca	0	(0)
2017	Sud América	26	(4)
2018	Boston River	29	(7)
2019–2020	Guayaquil City	54	(24)
2021–2022	Barcelona Sporting	44	(14)
2022–2024	América Mineiro	39	(18)
2024–	Athletico Paranaense	39	(8)
2025	→ Botafogo (loan)	12	(1)
2026–	→ América Mineiro (loan)	21	(4)

International career
2012	Uruguay U20	5	(3)
- * Club domestic league appearances and goals as of 18 November 2026

Gonzalo Mathías Mastriani Borges (born 28 April 1993) is a Uruguayan professional footballer who plays as a forward for Campeonato Brasileiro Série B club América Mineiro, on loan from Athletico Paranaense.

After beginning his career at Cerro, Mastriani moved to Italy with Parma, but served several loan stints and left the club without debuting. He then played in Uruguay and Mexico before scoring in a prolific rate with Guayaquil City in Ecuador.

A move to Barcelona Sporting followed, and Mastriani subsequently played for Brazilian clubs América Mineiro and Athletico Paranaense.

== Personal life ==
Mastriani's family hails from Italy, with his ancestors moving to Montevideo in the mid-19th century. His official surname was supposed to be "Mastroianni", but was registered as "Mastriani" after an error from the registry office.

== Club career ==
=== Cerro ===
Mastriani joined Cerro's youth setup in 2006, from lowly CSyD Sauce Baby Fútbol, after rejecting an offer from Defensor Sporting. He made his first team – and Primera División – debut for the club on 14 August 2011, starting and scoring the equalizer in a 3–1 home win over Cerrito.

On 25 September 2011, Mastriani scored a brace in a 2–1 home win over Liverpool Montevideo. In his first senior season, he was Cerro's top scorer with 12 goals, being an ever-present figure as the club finished in a mid-table position overall.

=== Parma and loans ===
In July 2013, amidst strong rumours to a move in the previous transfer windows, Mastriani moved abroad and signed for Italian Serie A side Parma. On 1 August, however, he was loaned to Serie B side Crotone, for one year.

After featuring rarely, Mastriani returned to Parma on 21 January 2014, but moved on loan to Slovenian side Gorica on 1 February, as the club had a partnership with Parma. On 27 August 2014, he switched teams and countries again, after agreeing to a one-year loan deal with Olhanense of the Portuguese Segunda Liga as a part of the deal which saw Lucas Souza move in the opposite direction.

=== Rentistas ===
On 5 August 2015, after Parma's bankruptcy, Mastriani returned to his home country and signed for Rentistas. In July 2016, he moved to Ascenso MX side Tampico Madero on loan.

=== Alebrijes Oaxaca, Sud América and Boston River ===
On 17 December 2016, Mastriani was announced at Alebrijes de Oaxaca, but left the club before debuting and signed for Sud América on 3 February 2017. He was regularly used by the club, but suffered relegation.

In January 2018, Mastriani moved to Boston River, where he was the club's top scorer during the year, with seven goals.

=== Guayaquil City ===
On 2 January 2019, Mastriani was presented at Ecuadorian Serie A side Guayaquil City. An immediate first-choice, he scored a career-best 14 league goals in his first season, adding more 10 in his second.

=== Barcelona SC ===
On 21 January 2021, Mastriani signed for Barcelona SC also in the Ecuadorian top tier. He was regularly used in the club's 2021 Copa Libertadores run, as the club reached the semifinals of the competition.

=== América Mineiro ===
On 10 August 2022, Mastriani signed a contract with Campeonato Brasileiro Série A side América Mineiro until December 2025. Initially a backup option, he became a regular starter in the 2023 Série A, being also the top scorer of the 2023 Copa Sudamericana with nine goals.

On 25 January 2024, in his first match of the season, Mastriani scored five goals in 68 minutes in a 6–0 Campeonato Mineiro home routing of Pouso Alegre.

=== Athletico Paranaense ===
On 29 January 2024, Mastriani agreed to a three-year deal with Athletico Paranaense, for a rumoured fee of € 2 million.

== International career ==
Mastriani was capped by the Uruguay national under-20 football team in 2012, scoring three goals in five matches.

== Career statistics ==
As of 4 April 2024

Appearances and goals by club, season and competition
Club	Season	League			Cup		Continental		State league		Other		Total	
Club	Season	Division	Apps	Goals	Apps	Goals	Apps	Goals	Apps	Goals	Apps	Goals	Apps	Goals
Cerro	2011–12	Primera División	30	12	—		—		—		—		30	12
Cerro	2012–13	Primera División	10	2	—		—		—		—		10	2
Cerro	Total		40	14	—		—		—		—		40	14
Crotone (loan)	2013–14	Serie B	5	0	—		—		—		—		5	0
Gorica (loan)	2013–14	PrvaLiga	9	1	—		—		—		—		9	1
Olhanense (loan)	2014–15	Segunda Liga	29	5	1	1	—		—		—		30	6
Rentistas	2016	Primera División	23	5	—		—		—		—		23	5
Tampico Madero (loan)	2016–17	Ascenso MX	12	1	—		—		—		—		12	1
Sud América	2017	Primera División	25	4	—		—		—		—		25	4
Boston River	2018	Primera División	29	7	—		4 (Note: Appearance(s) in Copa Sudamericana)	1	—		—		33	8
Guayaquil City	2019	Ecuadorian Serie A	28	14	—		—		—		—		28	14
Guayaquil City	2020	Ecuadorian Serie A	26	10	—		—		—		—		26	10
Guayaquil City	Total		54	24	—		—		—		—		54	24
Barcelona SC	2021	Ecuadorian Serie A	28	8	—		12	1	—		2 (Note: Appearance(s) in Supercopa Ecuador)	0	42	9
Barcelona SC	2022	Ecuadorian Serie A	16	7	—		11 (Note: Six appearances, one goal in Copa Libertadores; five appearances, two goals in Copa Sudamericana)	3	—		—		27	10
Barcelona SC	Total		44	15	0	0	23	4	—		2	0	69	19
América Mineiro	2022	Série A	11	1	—		—		—		—		11	1
América Mineiro	2023	Série A	24	11	4	1	12	9	2 (Note: Appearance(s) in Campeonato Mineiro)	0	—		42	21
América Mineiro	2024	Série A	0	0	0	0	—		2	6	—		2	6
América Mineiro	Total		35	12	4	1	12	9	4	6	—		55	28
Athletico Paranaense	2024	Série A	0	0	0	0	1	2	8 (Note: Appearance(s) in Campeonato Paranaense)	3	—		9	5
Career total			305	88	5	2	40	15	12	9	2	0	364	114

== Honours ==
Gorica

- Slovenian Football Cup: 2013–14
