= Facundo Queiroz =

Uruguayan footballer (born 1998)

Personal information
- Full name: Facundo Queiroz Martínez
- Date of birth: 16 March 1998 (age 28)
- Place of birth: Nueva Helvecia, Uruguay
- Height: 1.86 m (6 ft 1 in)
- Position: Defender

Team information
- Current team: Olimpia

Youth career
- 2015–2018: Nacional

Senior career*
Years	Team	Apps	(Gls)
2019	Boston River		
2020–2021	Bella Vista		
2021	Rukh Brest	0	(0)
2021	→ Minsk (loan)	4	(0)
2021	Colón	14	(0)
2022	Delfín	24	(1)
2023	Orense	4	(0)
2024	Fénix	9	(0)
2024–2025	Cobán Imperial	41	(3)
2025–	Olimpia	0	(0)
- * Club domestic league appearances and goals as of 2 June 2024

Facundo Queiroz (born 16 March 1998) is a Uruguayan professional footballer who plays for Liga Nacional club Olimpia.
