= Michael Carcelén =

Ecuadorian footballer (born 1997)

Personal information
- Full name: Michael Alexander Carcelén Carabalí
- Date of birth: 13 April 1997 (age 29)
- Place of birth: Ibarra, Ecuador
- Height: 1.91 m (6 ft 3 in)
- Position: Midfielder

Team information
- Current team: Aucas (on loan from Querétaro)
- Number: 34

Senior career*
Years	Team	Apps	(Gls)
2015–2016	Cuniburo	0	(0)
2017	Chivos	0	(0)
2018–2019	Cumbayá	19	(4)
2020–2021	El Nacional	20	(1)
2021	→ Barcelona SC (loan)	16	(1)
2022	Barcelona SC	2	(0)
2023–2025	Aucas	60	(11)
2023	→ Emelec (loan)	5	(0)
2025–	Querétaro	15	(0)
2026–	→ Aucas (loan)	7	(2)

International career^{‡}
2021–	Ecuador	5	(1)
- * Club domestic league appearances and goals as of 1 November 2026 ‡ National team caps and goals as of 04:26, 1 April 2022 (UTC)

Michael Alexander Carcelén Carabalí (born 13 April 1997) is an Ecuadorian footballer who plays as a midfielder for Ecuadorian Serie A club Aucas, on loan from Liga MX club Querétaro. He also plays for the Ecuador national team.

== Club career ==
=== Early career ===
Born in Ibarra, Imbabura Province, Carcelén began his career with Cuniburo FC in the Segunda Categoría de Pichincha in 2015, as a forward. In 2017, he played for Chivos FC also in the regional leagues, and also had a trial with Argentine side Rosario Central in July of that year.

Ahead of the 2018 season, Carcelén moved to Cumbayá, where he managed to featured in two Segunda Categoría editions, as a starter.

=== El Nacional ===
In 2020, Carcelén moved straight to Serie A after signing for El Nacional. He made his professional debut on 9 March, starting in a 1–1 home draw against Deportivo Cuenca.

Carcelén scored his first professional goal on 9 December 2020, netting his team's first in a 2–2 home draw against Aucas.

=== Barcelona SC ===
On 13 January 2021, Carcelén joined fellow top-tier side Barcelona SC in a one-year loan deal. In December, despite not being a regular starter, he signed a permanent four-year contract with the club.

== International career ==
On 23 October 2021, Carcelén was called up to the Ecuador national team by manager Gustavo Alfaro for a friendly against Mexico. He made his full international debut four days later, starting in the 3–2 win at the Bank of America Stadium in Charlotte, North Carolina.

Carcelén scored his first international goal on 4 December 2021, netting the opener in a 1–1 friendly draw against El Salvador.

== Career statistics ==
=== Club ===
As of 1 April 2022

Club	Season	League			Cup		Continental		Other		Total	
Club	Season	Division	Apps	Goals	Apps	Goals	Apps	Goals	Apps	Goals	Apps	Goals
Cuniburo	2015	Segunda Categoría de Pichincha	—		—		—		15 (Note: Appearance(s) in Campeonato Provincial de Segunda Categoría de Pichincha)	2	15	2
Chivos	2017	Segunda Categoría de Pichincha	—		—		—		3 (Note: Appearance(s) in Campeonato Provincial de Segunda Categoría de Imbabura)	1	3	1
Cumbayá	2018	Segunda Categoría	9	2	—		—		8	2	17	4
Cumbayá	2019	Segunda Categoría	10	2	—		—		9	2	19	4
Cumbayá	Total		19	4	—		—		17	4	36	8
El Nacional	2020	Ecuadorian Serie A	20	1	—		0	0	—		20	1
Barcelona SC	2021	Ecuadorian Serie A	16	1	—		9 (Note: Appearance(s) in Copa Libertadores)	0	2 (Note: Appearance(s) in Supercopa Ecuador)	0	27	1
Barcelona SC	2022	Ecuadorian Serie A	2	0	—		5	0	—		7	0
Barcelona SC	Total		18	1	—		14	0	2	0	34	1
Career total			57	6	0	0	14	0	37	7	108	13

=== International ===
As of 1 April 2022

Appearances and goals by national team and year
National team	Year	Apps	Goals
Ecuador	2021	2	1
Ecuador	2022	3	0
Total		5	1

==== International goals ====
Scores and results list Ecuador's goal tally first.

No	Date	Venue	Opponent	Score	Result	Competition
1.	4 December 2021	PNC Stadium, Houston, United States	El Salvador	1–1	1–1	Friendly
