= Pedro Velasco (footballer) =

Ecuadorian footballer (born 1993)

Pedro Pablo Velasco
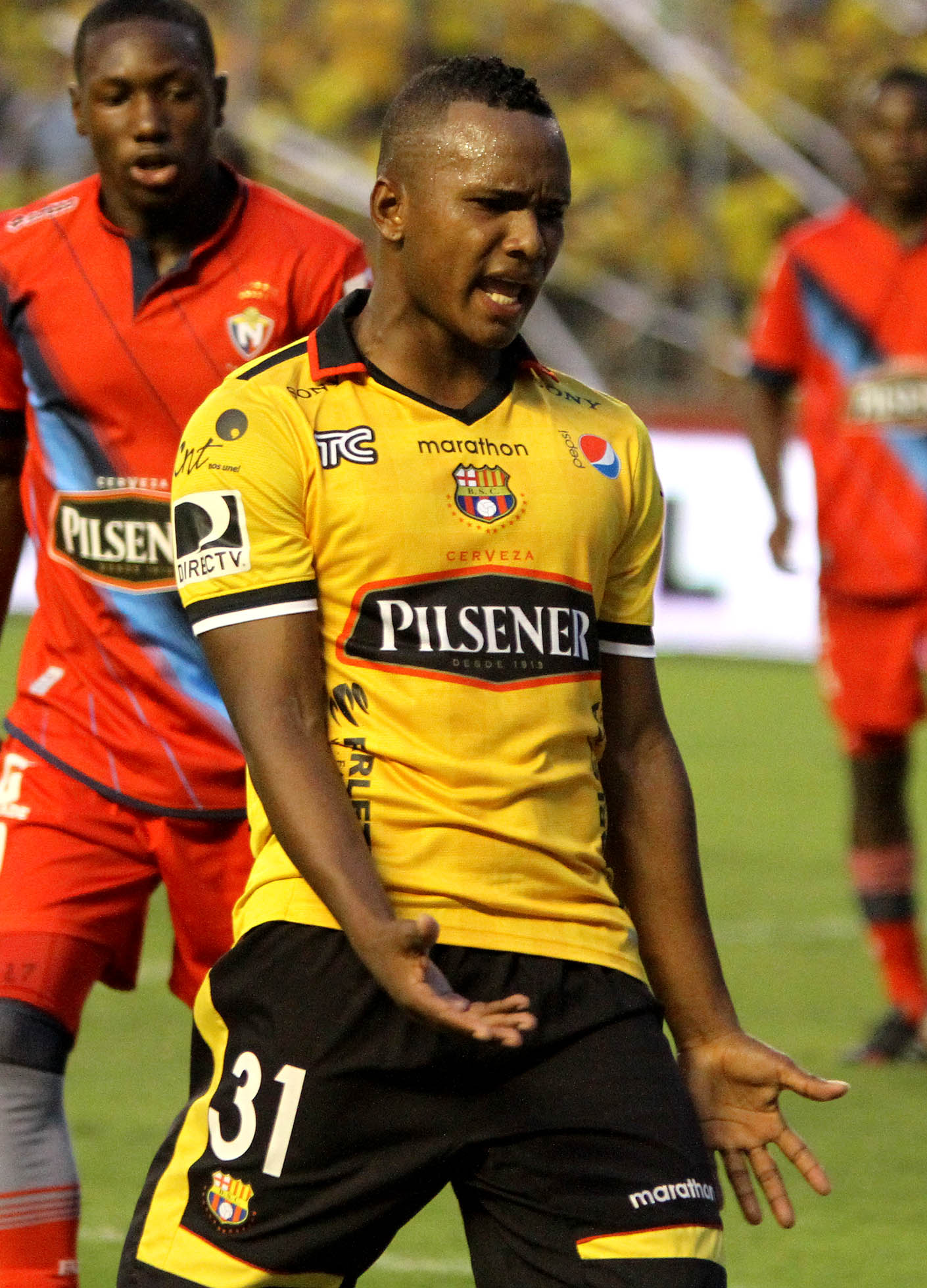
- Velasco with Barcelona in 2014

Personal information
- Full name: Pedro Pablo Velasco Arboleda
- Date of birth: June 29, 1993 (age 33)
- Place of birth: Esmeraldas, Ecuador
- Height: 1.73 m (5 ft 8 in)
- Position: Right-back

Team information
- Current team: Orense
- Number: 31

Youth career
- –2009: Deportivo Quito

Senior career*
Years	Team	Apps	(Gls)
2010–2013	Deportivo Quito	103	(1)
2013–2023	Barcelona SC	230	(15)
2024–	Orense	53	(1)

International career^{‡}
2016–	Ecuador	11	(0)
- * Club domestic league appearances and goals as of 20 August 2025 ‡ National team caps and goals as of 24 June 2019

Pedro Pablo Velasco Arboleda (born 29 June 1993) is an Ecuadorian professional football who plays as a right-back for Orense S.C. in the Ecuadorian Serie A.

== Club career ==
Velasco joined Barcelona in January 2013 from Deportivo Quito. In his first season with Barcelona he scored two goals out of 25 league games.

== International career ==
He was named in Ecuador's senior squad for a 2018 FIFA World Cup qualifier against Peru in September 2016.
