= Mario Pineida =

Ecuadorian footballer (1992–2025)

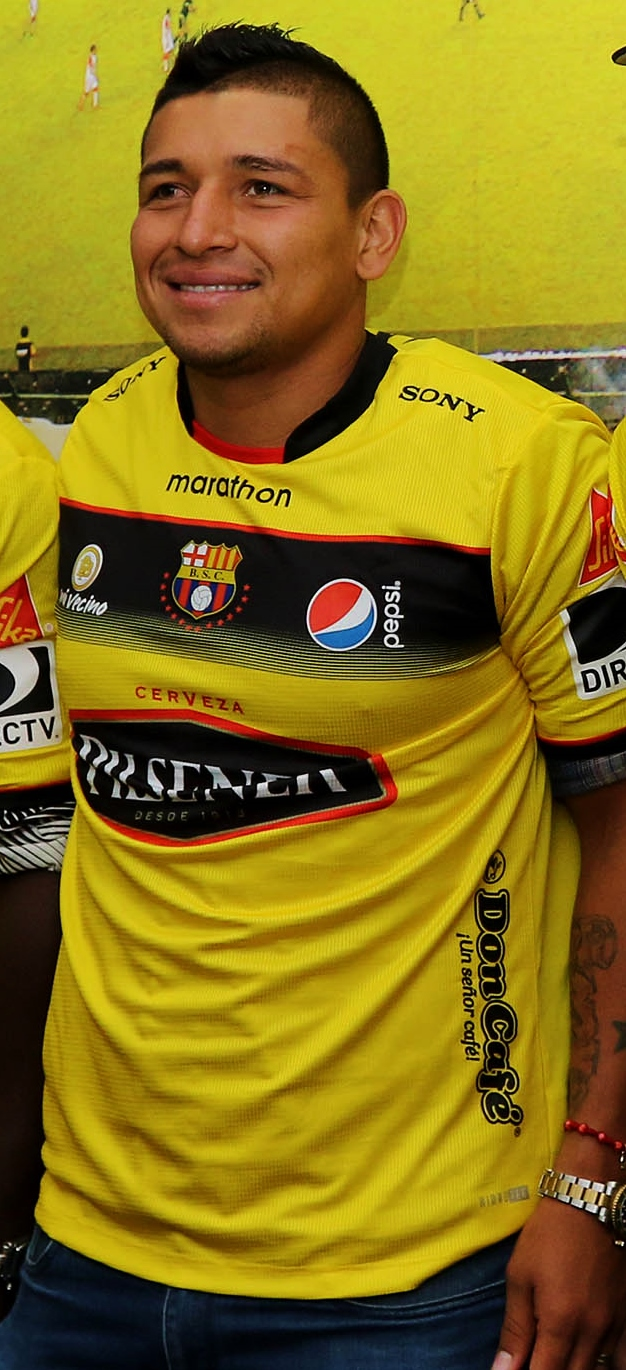
- Pineida in 2015

Personal information
- Full name: Mario Alberto Pineida Martínez
- Date of birth: 6 July 1992
- Place of birth: Santo Domingo, Ecuador
- Date of death: 17 December 2025 (aged 33)
- Place of death: Guayaquil, Ecuador
- Height: 1.70 m (5 ft 7 in)
- Position: Full-back

Youth career
- 2004: CSCD Brasilia
- 2007–2008: CD Saquisilí
- 2009: Panamá SC
- 2010: Independiente DV

Senior career*
Years	Team	Apps	(Gls)
2010–2015	Independiente DV	178	(3)
2016–2025	Barcelona SC	186	(2)
2022	→ Fluminense FC (loan)	15	(0)
2024	→ El Nacional (loan)	6	(0)
Total		385	(5)

International career
2010–2011	Ecuador U20	12	(0)
2015–2021	Ecuador	9	(0)
- * Club domestic league appearances and goals

Mario Alberto Pineida Martínez (6 July 1992 – 17 December 2025) was an Ecuadorian professional footballer who played as a full-back, spending most of his career with Independiente DV and Barcelona SC. He made nine appearances for the Ecuador national team.

== International career ==
Pineida was called up for the 2015 Copa América making the cut for the final 23.

== Death ==
Pineida was shot dead in Guayaquil on 17 December 2025, at the age of 33. He was killed along with a female partner, while his mother was injured in the attack. Two suspects were subsequently arrested.

== Honours ==
Barcelona

- Serie A: 2016, 2020

El Nacional

- Copa Ecuador: 2024
