= Gabriel Cortez =

Ecuadorian footballer (born 1995)

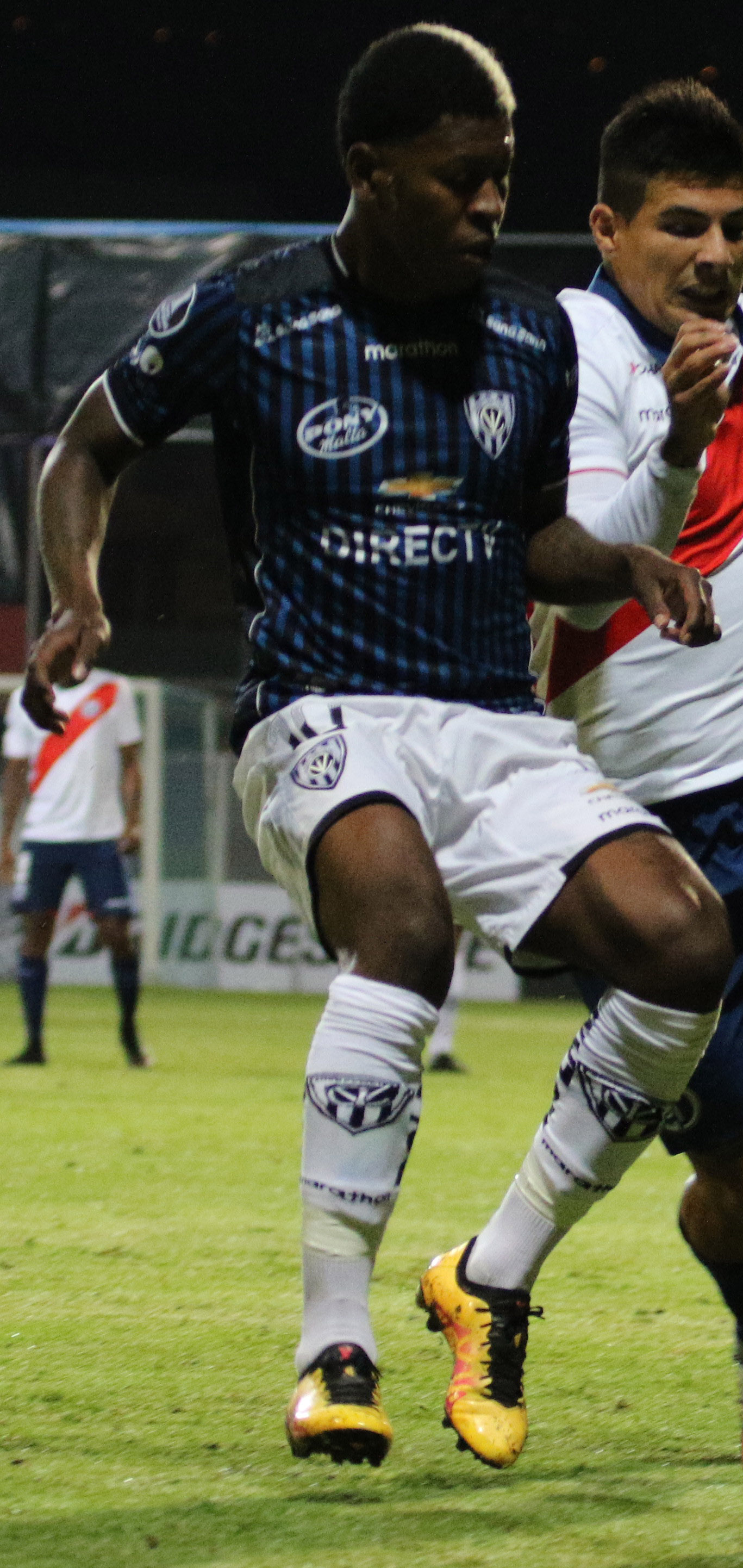
- Cortez playing for Independiente del Valle in 2017.

Personal information
- Full name: Gabriel Jhon Cortez Casierra
- Date of birth: 10 October 1995 (age 31)
- Place of birth: Esmeraldas, Ecuador
- Height: 1.79 m (5 ft 10 in)
- Position: Midfielder

Team information
- Current team: Barcelona SC

Youth career
- Independiente del Valle

Senior career*
Years	Team	Apps	(Gls)
2012–2017	Independiente del Valle	134	(30)
2018–2019	Lobos BUAP	21	(2)
2019	Emelec	15	(5)
2020	Botafogo	3	(0)
2020–2021	Guayaquil City	4	(0)
2021–	Barcelona SC	81	(25)
2022	→ 9 de Octubre F.C. (loan)	14	(5)
2024	→ El Nacional (loan)	3	(0)

International career^{‡}
2011	Ecuador U-17	4	(0)
2014–2015	Ecuador U-20	7	(1)
2017–	Ecuador	4	(0)
- * Club domestic league appearances and goals as of 20 August 2025 ‡ National team caps and goals as of 5 October 2017

Gabriel Jhon Cortez Casierra (born 10 October 1995) is an Ecuadorian footballer who plays as a midfielder for Ecuadorian Serie A club Barcelona SC. Previously Cortez played for Independiente del Valle, Lobos BUAP, Emelec, Botafogo and made his international debut on 22 February 2017 against Honduras.

== Career ==
=== Independiente Del Valle ===
In the 2017 Copa Libertadores group stage Cortez scored a last minute equalizer against Deportivo Municipal to keep his team in the competition.

=== Jail ===
On 24 April 2022 Gabriel "Loco" Cortez was arrested for potential ties with cartel. In June 2022 he was released on bail.

== Career statistics ==
As of 14 February 2020.

Club	Season	League			Cup		Continental		Other		Total	
Club	Season	Division	Apps	Goals	Apps	Goals	Apps	Goals	Apps	Goals	Apps	Goals
Independiente del Valle	2012	LigaPro	5	0	–		–		–		5	0
Independiente del Valle	2013	LigaPro	14	0	–		1 (Note: Appearance(s) in Copa Sudamericana.)	0	–		15	0
Independiente del Valle	2014	LigaPro	14	3	–		3 (Note: Three appearances in Copa Libertadores and one appearance in Copa Sudamericana.)	0	–		17	3
Independiente del Valle	2015	LigaPro	37	12	–		2 (Note: Appearance(s) in Copa Libertadores.)	0	–		39	12
Independiente del Valle	2016	LigaPro	34	9	–		6	0	–		40	9
Independiente del Valle	2017	LigaPro	30	6	–		4	2	–		34	8
Independiente del Valle	Total		134	30	0	0	16	2	0	0	150	32
Lobos BUAP	2017–18	Liga MX	14	2	–		–		–		14	2
Lobos BUAP	2017–18	Liga MX	7	0	–		–		–		7	0
Lobos BUAP	Total		21	2	0	0	0	0	0	0	21	2
Emelec	2019	LigaPro	15	5	–		4	0	–		19	5
Botafogo	2020	Série A	0	0	0	0	–		0	0	0	0
Career total			170	37	0	0	20	2	0	0	190	39
