= Javier Burrai =

Ecuadorian footballer (born 1990)

Personal information
- Full name: Javier Nicolás Burrai
- Date of birth: 9 October 1990 (age 36)
- Place of birth: San Nicolás, Argentina
- Height: 1.89 m (6 ft 2 in)
- Position: Goalkeeper

Team information
- Current team: Millonarios (on loan from Club Atlético Sarmiento)
- Number: 1

Senior career*
Years	Team	Apps	(Gls)
2010–2013	Arsenal de Sarandí	0	(0)
2013	→ FC Locarno (loan)	0	(0)
2014–2015	Guillermo Brown	1	(0)
2016–2017	Sarmiento	7	(0)
2017–2018	→ Gimnasia y Esgrima (loan)	15	(0)
2018–2020	Macará	42	(0)
2020–2025	Barcelona S.C.	134	(0)
2025–2026	Talleres	2	(0)
2026–	Sarmiento	16	(0)
2026–	→ Millonarios (loan)	13	(0)

International career^{‡}
2024–	Ecuador	1	(0)
- * Club domestic league appearances and goals as of 16:38, 5 October 2026 (UTC) ‡ National team caps and goals as of 24 March 2024

Javier Nicolás Burrai (born 9 October 1990) is a footballer who plays as a goalkeeper for Colombian club Millonarios, on loan from Sarmiento. Born in Argentina, he plays for the Ecuador national team.

== International career ==
Burrai was naturalized as Ecuadorian in November 2023 after years in the country. He was called up to the Ecuador national team that month for a set of 2026 FIFA World Cup qualification matches.

He made his debut on 24 March 2024 in a friendly against Italy.

== Career statistics ==
=== Club ===
As of match played 1 December 2024.

Appearances and goals by club, season and competition
Club	Season	League			Cup		Continental		Other		Total	
Club	Season	Division	Apps	Goals	Apps	Goals	Apps	Goals	Apps	Goals	Apps	Goals
Arsenal de Sarandí	2010–11	Primera División	0	0	0	0	0	0	—		0	0
Arsenal de Sarandí	2011–12	Primera División	0	0	0	0	0	0	—		0	0
Arsenal de Sarandí	2012–13	Primera División	0	0	0	0	0	0	—		0	0
Arsenal de Sarandí	Total		0	0	0	0	0	0	—		7	0
Guillermo Brown	2014	Torneo Federal A	6	0	—		—		—		6	0
Guillermo Brown	2015	Primera B Nacional	43	0	1	0	—		—		44	0
Guillermo Brown	Total		49	0	1	0	—		—		50	0
Club Atlético Sarmiento	2016	Primera División	0	0	0	0	—		—		0	0
Club Atlético Sarmiento	2016–17	Primera División	6	0	1	0	—		—		7	0
Club Atlético Sarmiento	Total		6	0	1	0	—		—		7	0
Gimnasia y Esgrima (loan)	2016–17	Primera B Nacional	24	0	—		—		—		24	0
Macará	2018	Ecuadorian Serie A	23	0	—		—		—		23	0
Macará	2019	Ecuadorian Serie A	25	0	—		4	0	—		29	0
Macará	Total		48	0	—		4	0	—		52	0
Barcelona S.C.	2020	Ecuadorian Serie A	30	0	—		9	0	—		39	0
Barcelona S.C.	2021	Ecuadorian Serie A	30	0	—		12	0	2	0	44	0
Barcelona S.C.	2022	Ecuadorian Serie A	30	0	—		12	0	—		42	0
Barcelona S.C.	2023	Ecuadorian Serie A	22	0	—		5	0	—		27	0
Barcelona S.C.	2024	Ecuadorian Serie A	22	0	—		8	0	—		30	0
Barcelona S.C.	Total		134	0	—		46	0	4	0	184	0
Career total			261	0	1	0	50	0	2	0	314	0

=== International ===
As of match played 24 March 2024

Appearances and goals by national team and year
National team	Year	Apps	Goals
Ecuador	2024	1	0
Total		1	0

== Honours ==
Barcelona S.C.

- Serie A: 2020
