= Jonathan Perlaza =

Ecuadorian footballer (born 1997)

Personal information
- Full name: Jonathan Ezequiel Perlaza Leiva
- Date of birth: 13 September 1997 (age 29)
- Place of birth: Guayaquil, Ecuador
- Height: 1.69 m (5 ft 7 in)
- Position: Midfielder

Team information
- Current team: Barcelona de Guayaquil
- Number: 15

Youth career
- 2008–2015: Rocafuerte

Senior career*
Years	Team	Apps	(Gls)
2015–2017	Rocafuerte	26	(0)
2018–2020	Guayaquil City	54	(5)
2020–2025	Querétaro	42	(0)
2021–2022	→ Barcelona de Guayaquil (loan)	49	(1)
2026–	Barcelona de Guayaquil	0	(0)
- * Club domestic league appearances and goals as of 20 April 2025

Jonathan Ezequiel Perlaza Leiva (born 13 September 1997 in Guayaquil, Ecuador) is an Ecuadorian footballer who plays for LigaPro Serie A club Barcelona de Guayaquil.
