= Byron Castillo =

Ecuadorian footballer (born 1995)

Personal information
- Full name: Byron David Castillo Segura
- Date of birth: 25 June 1995 (age 31) (disputed)
- Place of birth: Tumaco, Colombia (disputed)
- Height: 1.70 m (5 ft 7 in)
- Position: Right-back

Team information
- Current team: Barcelona SC (on loan from León)
- Number: 26

Youth career
- 2012–2014: Norte América

Senior career*
Years	Team	Apps	(Gls)
2014–2016	Norte América	0	(0)
2014–2015	→ Deportivo Azogues (loan)	8	(1)
2015	→ Emelec (loan)	0	(0)
2016	→ Aucas (loan)	22	(1)
2017–2022	Barcelona SC	106	(8)
2022–	León	23	(1)
2023	→ Pachuca (loan)	10	(0)
2024	→ Peñarol (loan)	10	(0)
2024–	→ Barcelona SC (loan)	36	(0)

International career^{‡}
2015	Ecuador U17	14	(0)
2016	Ecuador U20	1	(0)
2021–2022	Ecuador	10	(0)
- * Club domestic league appearances and goals as of 20 August 2025 ‡ National team caps and goals as of 22:11, 16 June 2022 (UTC)

Byron David Castillo Segura (born 25 June 1995) is an Ecuadorian professional footballer who plays as a right-back for Ecuadorian Serie A club Barcelona SC and the Ecuador national team.

== Club career ==
=== Early career ===
Castillo began his career with Norte América, but made his debut as a senior while on loan at Deportivo Azogues. In May 2015, he was loaned to Emelec, but was released in July after having problems with his documentation.

In January 2016, Castillo moved to Aucas. He made his Serie A debut with the side on 7 February, starting in a 1–2 away loss against Fuerza Amarilla, and scored his first goal in the category late in the month, in a 1–1 home draw against Mushuc Runa. On 31 December, Aucas announced that he had extended his contract with the club for a further four seasons.

=== Barcelona SC ===
On 5 January 2017, Castillo was presented at Barcelona SC. After featuring in just one match during his first season, he started to feature more regularly from the 2018 season onwards, and became a regular starter in 2020.

On 10 July 2021, Castillo signed a new contract with the club until 2025.

=== León ===
On 10 June 2022, Castillo signed for Liga MX side León.

== International career ==
=== Youth ===
Castillo was a part of the Ecuador under-17 team that featured in both the 2015 South American U-17 Championship and the 2015 FIFA U-17 World Cup, being an undisputed starter for the side in both tournaments. In November 2016, he featured for the under-20s in a friendly against Chile.

=== Senior ===
On 29 August 2021, Castillo was called up to the Ecuador national team by manager Gustavo Alfaro for three 2022 FIFA World Cup qualifiers against Paraguay, Chile and Uruguay. He made his full international debut on 2 September, starting in the 2–0 win over the former at the Estadio Rodrigo Paz Delgado in Quito.

== Nationality issues ==
In 2017, Castillo was separated from the Ecuador under-20 squad after allegations that he was born in Tumaco, a Colombian city near the Ecuadorian border. He was accused of adulterating his birth documentation in January 2019 and this issue kept him out of any Ecuador national team until 2021.

In February 2021, an investigation started to determine if Castillo was Ecuadorian or Colombian. Finally, on 24 April of that year, his Ecuadorian nationality was confirmed. In May 2022, the Chilean Football Federation submitted a complaint to FIFA about Castillo's nationality, alleging that he was born in Tumaco, Colombia in July 1995, and not in Playas, Ecuador on 10 November 1998 as previously thought. FIFA closed the investigation after nearly one month on 10 June, confirming Ecuador's spot in the World Cup, saying he was an Ecuadorian citizen and never represented Colombia in a competitive match.

Spanish sporting newspaper Marca published audio that was apparently of Castillo admitting his illegitimate entry into Ecuador, as well as his birthplace in Colombia, and his correct year of birth. The recording was said to be from an interview between Castillo and the Ecuadorian football association, but was kept quiet by the federation. The paper also published both Colombian and Ecuadorian birth certificates for Castillo, illustrating discrepancies in his name, birthplace, and date of birth. FIFA's Appeals Commission reopened the investigation and in early October ruled in favor of Castillo again.

On 8 November 2022, the Court of Arbitration for Sport ruled that Castillo was indeed born in Tumaco on 25 June 1995, but since the nationality of a player is defined by national law, Ecuador recognizes him as an Ecuadorian national. Furthermore, the Court upheld the FIFA's policy regarding international eligibility as Castillo never played for the Colombia national team in a competitive match, he was deemed eligible to play for the Ecuador national team. The Ecuadorian Football Federation (FEF) were however, fined CHF 100,000 and handed a 3-point deduction in the 2026 World Cup qualifiers for CONMEBOL due to the use of a document which contained false information. On 3 November 2023, the Swiss Federal Supreme Court denied the FEF's appeal of the TAS decision.

== Career statistics ==
=== Club ===
As of 10 June 2022

Club	Season	League			Cup		Continental		Other		Total	
Club	Season	Division	Apps	Goals	Apps	Goals	Apps	Goals	Apps	Goals	Apps	Goals
Deportivo Azogues	2014	Ecuadorian Serie B	3	0	—		—		—		3	0
Deportivo Azogues	2015	Ecuadorian Serie B	5	1	—		—		—		5	1
Deportivo Azogues	Total		8	1	—		—		—		8	1
Aucas	2016	Ecuadorian Serie A	22	1	—		2 (Note: Appearance(s) in Copa Sudamericana)	0	—		24	1
Barcelona	2017	Ecuadorian Serie A	1	0	—		—		—		1	0
Barcelona	2018	Ecuadorian Serie A	17	2	—		1	0	—		18	2
Barcelona	2019	Ecuadorian Serie A	18	1	—		2 (Note: Appearance(s) in Copa Libertadores)	0	—		20	1
Barcelona	2020	Ecuadorian Serie A	31	2	—		10	1	—		41	3
Barcelona	2021	Ecuadorian Serie A	27	3	—		12	0	2 (Note: Appearance(s) in Supercopa Ecuador)	0	41	3
Barcelona	2022	Ecuadorian Serie A	12	0	—		8 (Note: Five appearances in Copa Libertadores, three appearances in Copa Sudamericana)	0	—		20	0
Barcelona	Total		106	8	—		33	1	2	0	141	9
León	2022–23	Liga MX	0	0	—		—		—		0	0
Career total			136	10	0	0	35	1	2	0	173	11

=== International ===
As of 12 November 2022

Ecuador
Year	Apps	Goals
2021	6	0
2022	7	0
Total	13	0

== Honours ==
Barcelona SC

- Ecuadorian Serie A: 2020

León

- CONCACAF Champions League: 2023

Individual

- South American Team of the Year: 2021
- Copa Libertadores Team of the Tournament: 2021
