= Adonis Preciado =

Ecuadorian footballer

Personal information
- Full name: Adonis Stalin Preciado Quintero
- Date of birth: 23 March 1997 (age 29)
- Place of birth: Guayaquil, Ecuador
- Height: 1.75 m (5 ft 9 in)
- Position: Winger

Team information
- Current team: Tijuana
- Number: 7

Youth career
- 2011–2014: Guayaquil Sport

Senior career*
Years	Team	Apps	(Gls)
2014–2015	Guayaquil Sport	2	(1)
2015	Guayaquil FC		
2016	El Guayacán	6	(0)
2017	Emelec	11	(1)
2017	→ Rocafuerte (loan)	19	(6)
2018	Puerto Quito	32	(0)
2019–2020	Chacaritas	0	(0)
2019	→ Mushuc Runa (loan)	21	(4)
2020–2024	Barcelona	109	(7)
2025	Querétaro	15	(4)
2025–	Tijuana	48	(4)
- * Club domestic league appearances and goals as of 05:37, 26 October 2026 (UTC)

Adonis Stalin Preciado Quintero (born 23 March 1997) is an Ecuadorian footballer who plays as a winger for Liga MX club Tijuana.

== Career ==
Preciado began his youth career with Guayaquil Sport in 2011.

In 2017, he was part of the Emelec reserves and their sister club, Rocafuerte, where he played in the Segunda Categoría. He had a stint at Puerto Quito in Serie B, before joining Chacaritas in 2019, who loaned him out to Mushuc Runa.

Under the management of Geovanny Cumbicus, he made his debut in Serie A, the top tier of Ecuadorian football, on 24 February 2019 in a game against Barcelona SC. He came on as a substitute in the 70th minute for Henry Patta in a 0–2 defeat. He scored his first goal in Serie A on 27 July 2019 in the 1st minute of first half added time in 5–1 home win against Barcelona SC.

In 2020, he joined Barcelona SC. After five seasons, it was announced that he would not be renewing his contract and he moved abroad for the first time in his career to sign for Liga MX club Querétaro.

== International career ==
He was called up to the Ecuador under-23 national team ahead of the 2020 South American Pre-Olympic Tournament in Colombia.

== Honours ==
Barcelona SC

- Ecuadorian Serie A: 2020
