= 2019 Barcelona Sporting Club season =

Ecuadorian football club season

Barcelona SC
2019 season
- President: José Francisco Cevallos
- Head Coach: Guillermo Almada (until 12 April); Leonardo Ramos (until 30 October); Tabaré Silva
- Stadium: Monumental Banco Pichincha
- Liga Pro: Quarter-finals
- Copa Ecuador: Semi-finals
- C. Libertadores: Second qualifying stage
- Top goalscorer: League: Fidel Martínez (16); All: Fidel Martínez (17)
- Biggest win: Barcelona 6–2 Deportivo Cuenca
- Biggest defeat: Mushuc Runa 5–1 Barcelona
Home colours	Away colours	Third colours

The 2019 season was Barcelona Sporting Club's 94th season in existence and the club's 61st season in the top flight of Ecuadorian football. Barcelona was involved in three competitions: the main national tournament Liga Pro, the national cup called Copa Ecuador, and the international tournament Copa Libertadores.

In their Copa Libertadores campaign, Barcelona played the second qualifying phase against the Uruguayan Defensor Sporting. Barcelona won the first leg match 2-1 away from home, but Defensor Sporting claim CONMEBOL for an infraction of Barcelona. CONMEBOL awarded Defensor Sporting a 3–0 win as a result of Barcelona fielding an ineligible player. In the second leg match, Barcelona won 1-0 at home but Defensor won 3-1 on aggregate, so Barcelona was eliminated from the tournament.

In their Copa Ecuador campaign Barcelona started playing in the round of 32. Barcelona won 3–1 on aggregate against Mineros SC and advanced to the round of 16. Then Barcelona won the key by the away goals rule (the aggregate score ended up in 2–2) against Santa Rita and advanced to quarterfinals. Barcelona also won in their quarterfinals key against El Nacional by the away goals rule (the aggregate score ended up 1–1) and advanced to semifinals. However, in their semifinals key, Barcelona tied 4-4 on aggregate but lost by the away goals rule against Delfín SC and was eliminated from the tournament.

In their Liga Pro campaign, Barcelona was one of the sixteen fighting for the championship. In the first stage Barcelona won 17 matches, had 4 draws and 9 losses obtaining 55 points at the end of the stage and a +18 of goal difference. Barcelona ended up in the second place of the table, qualifying to 2020 Copa Libertadores first stage and the playoffs. In the quarterfinals Barcelona lost the key against Aucas 0-1 on aggregate and was eliminated from the tournament.

== Season overview ==
=== February ===
On 6 February, Barcelona started their season and their Copa Libertadores campaign defeating Defensor Sporting 1-2 away from home. Ely Esterilla scored the first goal of the 2019 Barcelona season. Álvaro Navarro scored for the Uruguayan club getting a temporary draw, but Barcelona took the lead again by a goal from Xavier Arreaga near the end of the match.

On 9 February, Barcelona started their Liga Pro campaign defeating El Nacional 5–2 at home. Fidel Martínez scored the first goal of the match by penalty kick. Two goals scored by Martínez and another more by Stalin Caicedo made Barcelona taking the lead in the first half. In the second half, El Nacional scored two goals by Jordy Caicedo, but Barcelona expanded their score by two more goals from Ayrton Cisneros y Ángel Quiñónez in the last minutes of the match.

On 11 February, CONMEBOL awarded Defensor Sporting a 3–0 win as a result of Barcelona fielding the ineligible player Sebastián Pérez Cardona in the first leg.

On 12 February, Barcelona defeated Uruguayan Defensor Sporting again 1-0 at home, but due to the CONMEBOL punishment Defensor Sporting won 3–1 on aggregate and advanced to the third stage of the 2019 Copa Libertadores qualifying stages.

In their second Liga Pro match held on 16 February, Barcelona drew 0-0 against Macará.

On 24 February, Barcelona defeated Mushuc Runa 2-0 away from home. Oscar Estupiñan and Ángel Quiñonez scored for Barcelona.

=== March ===
Barcelona lost their two first matches in March: the first one was held on 3 March against Independiente with a 3-0 lost away from home, and the second one was against Universidad Católica with a 2-1 at home held on 10 March.

On 17 March, Barcelona defeated Fuerza Amarilla 0-3 away from home. Barcelona goals were scored by Pedro Pablo Velasco, Fidel Martínez and Christian Alemán.

In the seventh round of the Liga Pro first stage, Barcelona drew 1-1 against Liga de Quito in a match played on 30 March. Barcelona goal was scored by Fidel Martínez in the 25th minute, but in the last minutes of the match Rodrigo Aguirre scored for L.D.U.

=== April ===
Barcelona started April with a draw against América de Quito in a match played on 6 April which ended 2-2 away from home.

Barcelona's biggest win of this season was held on 12 April against Deportivo Cuenca which was defeated 6-2 at home.

On 21 April, Barcelona defeated Delfín 3-1 at home. Barcelona goals were scored by Fidel Martínez, Robert Herrera and Leonardo Campana.

On 24 April, Barcelona started their Copa Ecuador campaign with drew match against Mineros SC with a 1-1 away from home.

Also Aucas was defeated by Barcelona in a match played on 27 April which ended 3-4 away from home.

=== May ===
On 5 May, Barcelona defeated Guayaquil City 1-0 at home. Barcelona's only goal was scored by Leo Campana.

On 12 May, Barcelona defeated their big rival Emelec 0-1 away from home. In the first official Clásico del Astillero of the year, Barcelona's only goal was scored by Fidel Martínez.

On 16 May, Barcelona played the second leg match of the Copa Ecuador Round of 32 against Mineros SC winning with a 2-0. Osbaldo Lastra and Ely Esterilla scored for the Canarios. Barcelona won 3-1 on aggregate and advanced to Round of 16.

== Goalscorers ==
No.	Pos.	Nation	Name	App.	Liga Pro	Copa Ecuador	Copa Libertadores	Total
11	FW	(Ecuador)	Fidel Martínez	-	16	1	0	17
23	MF	(Ecuador)	Christian Alemán	-	6	1	0	7
9	FW	(Ecuador)	Oscar Estupiñán	-	5	0	0	5
	FW	(Uruguay)	Jonathan Álvez	-	3	1	0	4
19	FW	(Ecuador)	Leonardo Campana	-	3	1	0	4
21	FW	(Ecuador)	Ángel Quiñonez	-	3	0	0	3
13	FW	(Ecuador)	Ely Esterilla	-	1	1	1	3
10	FW	(Argentina)	Damián Díaz	-	2	0	0	2
77	MF	(Ecuador)	Washington Vera	-	1	1	0	2
29	DF	(Ecuador)	Félix Torres	-	2	0	0	2
18	MF	(Argentina)	Matías Oyola	-	0	1	1	2
	MF	(Ecuador)	Pedro Arboleda	-	2	0	0	2
8	MF	(Ecuador)	Richard Calderón	-	1	0	0	1
4	DF	(Uruguay)	Robert Herrera	-	1	0	0	1
31	DF	(Ecuador)	Pedro Pablo Velasco	-	1	0	0	1
33	DF	(Ecuador)	Ayrton Cisneros	-	1	0	0	1
31	MF	(Ecuador)	Osbaldo Lastra	-	0	1	0	1
3	DF	(Ecuador)	Xavier Arreaga	-	0	0	1	1
53	MF	(Ecuador)	José Caicedo	-	1	0	0	1
	MF	(Ecuador)	Marcos Caicedo	-	1	0	0	1
	MF	(Ecuador)	Billy Arce	-	1	0	0	1
	MF	(Ecuador)	Byron Castillo	-	1	0	0	1
	MF	(Ecuador)	Mario Pineida	-	1	0	0	1
	MF	(Brazil)	Gabriel Marques	-	1	0	0	1
	MF	(Colombia)	Sebastián Pérez Cardona	-	1	0	0	1
Own goals					0	0	0	0
TOTAL					34	3	3	40

== Competitions ==
Win Draw Loss

=== Liga Pro ===
==== First stage ====
===== Standings =====
Pos	Team	Pld	W	D	L	GF	GA	GD	Pts	Qualification or relegation
1	Macará	30	17	11	2	47	16	+31	62	Advance to Playoffs
2	Barcelona	30	17	4	9	55	38	+17	55	Advance to Playoffs
3	Universidad Católica	30	16	5	9	48	29	+19	53	Advance to Playoffs
4	Delfín	30	15	8	7	46	33	+13	53	Advance to Playoffs
5	Independiente del Valle	30	15	7	8	41	29	+12	52	Advance to Playoffs
6	LDU Quito	30	13	10	7	46	30	+16	49	Advance to Playoffs
7	Aucas	30	14	7	9	48	44	+4	49	Advance to Playoffs
8	Emelec	30	14	4	12	43	30	+13	46	Advance to Playoffs
9	El Nacional (Note: El Nacional were deducted one point for failing to submit their payrolls and social security contributions to the IESS for the month of August.)	30	13	6	11	41	34	+7	44	
10	Deportivo Cuenca (Note: Deportivo Cuenca were deducted one point for failing to submit their payrolls and social security contributions to the IESS for the month of May.)	30	12	7	11	44	46	−2	42	
11	Olmedo	30	9	7	14	34	44	−10	34	
12	Guayaquil City	30	8	7	15	35	48	−13	31	
13	Mushuc Runa	30	8	6	16	36	58	−22	30	
14	Técnico Universitario	30	8	5	17	40	60	−20	29	
15	América de Quito (R)	30	6	7	17	26	41	−15	25	Relegation to Serie B
16	Fuerza Amarilla (Note: Fuerza Amarilla were deducted four points for failing to submit their payrolls and social security contributions to the IESS, and one additional point for failing to submit their payrolls and social security contributions to the IESS for the month of May.) (R)	30	2	5	23	24	74	−50	6	Relegation to Serie B

Source: LigaPro, Soccerway
Rules for classification: 1) Points, 2) Goal difference, 3) Goals for, 4) Away goals for, 5) Head-to-head record, 6) Drawing of lots.
(R) Relegated

===== Results summary =====
Overall								Home						Away					
Pld	W	D	L	GF	GA	GD	Pts	W	D	L	GF	GA	GD	W	D	L	GF	GA	GD
30	17	4	9	56	38	+18	55	10	1	4	34	17	+17	7	3	5	22	21	+1

Last updated: 4 November 2019.
Source: Liga Pro

===== Results by round =====
Round	1	2	3	4	5	6	7	8	9	10	11	12	13	14	15	16	17	18	19	20	21	22	23	24	25	26	27	28	29	30
Ground	H	A	H	A	H	A	H	A	H	H	A	H	A	A	H	A	H	A	H	A	H	A	H	A	A	H	A	H	H	A
Result	W	D	W	L	L	W	D	D	W	W	W	W	W	W	W	L	L	L	W	L	W	L	W	D	W	W	W	L	L	W
Position	1	1	1	7	8	6	8	9	6	5	3	3	2	1	1	4	5	5	4	5	4	5	5	5	4	3	2	3	3	2

Updated to match(es) played on 29 May 2019. Source: LigaPro
A = Away; H = Home; W = Win; D = Draw; L = Loss

===== Matches =====
9 February 2019 1	Barcelona	5-2	El Nacional	Guayaquil
19:30 ECT		Report		Stadium: Monumental Banco Pichincha; Attendance: 12.718; Referee: Juan Albarracín

16 February 2019 2	Macará	0-0	Barcelona	Ambato
19:30 ECT		Report		Stadium: Estadio Bellavista; Attendance: 6.438; Referee: Vinicio Espinel

24 February 2019 3	Barcelona	2-0	Mushuc Runa	Guayaquil
16:15 ECT		Report		Stadium: Monumental Banco Pichincha; Attendance: 24.882; Referee: Diego Lara

3 March 2019 4	Independiente	3-0	Barcelona	Sangolqui
16:15 ECT		Report		Stadium: Estadio Rumiñahui; Attendance: 4.215; Referee: Luis Quiroz

10 March 2019 5	Barcelona	1-2	Universidad Católica	Guayaquil
16:15 ECT		Report		Stadium: Monumental Banco Pichincha; Attendance: 18.841; Referee: Jefferson Macías

17 March 2019 6	Fuerza Amarilla	0-3	Barcelona	Machala
15:00 ECT		Report		Stadium: Estadio 9 de Mayo; Attendance: 18.841; Referee: Carlos Orbe

30 March 2019 7	Barcelona	1-1	L.D.U. Quito	Guayaquil
17:30 ECT		Report		Stadium: Monumental Banco Pichincha; Attendance: 23.636; Referee: Guillermo Guerrero

6 April 2019 8	América de Quito	2-2	Barcelona	Quito
20:00 ECT		Report		Stadium: Olímpico Atahualpa; Referee: Roddy Zambrano

12 April 2019 9	Barcelona	6-2	Deportivo Cuenca	Guayaquil
19:15ECT		Report		Stadium: Monumental Banco Pichincha; Attendance: 14.889; Referee: Franklin Congo

21 April 2019 10	Barcelona	3-1	Delfín	Guayaquil
16:15 ECT		Report		Stadium: Monumental Banco Pichincha; Attendance: 21.871; Referee: Marlon Vera

27 April 2019 11	Aucas	3-4	Barcelona	Quito
18:30 ECT		Report		Stadium: Gonzalo Pozo Ripalda; Referee: Luis Quiroz

5 May 2019 12	Barcelona	1-0	Guayaquil City	Guayaquil
18:00 ECT		Report		Stadium: Monumental Banco Pichincha; Attendance: 20.150; Referee: Diego Lara

12 May 2019 13	Emelec	0-1	Barcelona	Guayaquil
18:00 ECT		Report		Stadium: Estadio Katherine Cronin; Referee: Guillermo Guerrero

19 May 2019 14	Técnico Universitario	0-3	Barcelona	Ambato
16:15 ECT		Report		Stadium: Estadio Bellavista; Referee: Franklin Congo

24 May 2019 15	Barcelona	2-0	Olmedo	Guayaquil
19:30 ECT		Report		Stadium: Monumental Banco Pichincha; Attendance: 17.172; Referee: Carlos Orbe

6 July 2019 16	El Nacional	1-0	Barcelona	Quito
19:15 ECT	J. Ordóñez 26'			Stadium: Olímpico Atahualpa

14 July 2019 17	Barcelona	1-2	Macará	Guayaquil
16:15 ECT	F. Martínez 96'			Stadium: Monumental Banco Pichincha; Referee: Guillermo Guerrero

21 July 2019 18	Mushuc Runa	5-1	Barcelona	Ambato
12:00 ECT			Leonardo Campana 64'	Stadium: COAC Mushuc Runa; Referee: Roddy Zambrano

28 July 2019 19	Barcelona	4-1	Independiente	Guayaquil
16:15 ECT	J. Álvez 11'; F. Martínez 28'; M. Pineida 30'; C. Alemán 50' (pen.)			Stadium: Monumental Banco Pichincha; Referee: Franklin Congo

4 August 2019 20	Universidad Católica	2-1	Barcelona	Quito
16:15 ECT			B. Castillo 74'	Stadium: Olímpico Atahualpa; Referee: Roberto Sánchez

12 August 2019 21	Barcelona	2-1	Fuerza Amarilla	Guayaquil
19:30 ECT	P. Velasco 38'; D. Díaz 82'			Stadium: Monumental Banco Pichincha; Referee: Vinicio Espinel

16 August 2019 22	L.D.U. Quito	2-0	Barcelona	Quito
19:15 ECT				Stadium: Casa Blanca; Referee: Augusto Aragon

24 August 2019 23	Barcelona	4-0	América de Quito	Guayaquil
19:30 ECT	F. Martínez 18', 28', 82' (pen.); D. Díaz 43' (pen.)			Stadium: Monumental Banco Pichincha; Referee: Carlos Orbe

30 August 2019 24	Deportivo Cuenca	1-1	Barcelona	Cuenca
20:00 ECT			F. Martínez 53' (pen.)	Stadium: Estadio Alejandro Serrano Aguilar; Referee: Roberto Sánchez

14 September 2019 25	Delfín	1-2	Barcelona	Manta
15:15 ECT			Riveros 28' (o.g.); Ordoñez 34' (o.g.)	Stadium: Estadio Jocay; Referee: Guillermo Guerrero

22 September 2019 26	Barcelona	2-1	Aucas	Guayaquil
16:30 ECT	J. Álvez 12'; B. Arce 37'			Stadium: Monumental Banco Pichincha; Referee: Mario Romero

28 September 2019 27	Guayaquil City	0-2	Barcelona	Guayaquil
18:30 ECT			L. Campana 16'; J. Jiménez 35' (o.g.)	Stadium: Estadio Christian Benítez Betancourt; Referee: Carlos Orbe

20 October 2019 28	Barcelona	0-3	Emelec	Guayaquil
17:00 ECT				Stadium: Monumental Banco Pichincha; Referee: Franklin Congo

27 October 2019 29	Barcelona	0-1	Técnico Universitario	Guayaquil
15:30 ECT				Stadium: Monumental Banco Pichincha; Referee: José Espinel

3 November 2019 30	Olmedo	1-2	Barcelona	Riobamba
? ECT			J. Álvez 45+1'; M. Caicedo 46'	Stadium: Estadio Olímpico; Referee: Oscar Proaño

==== Playoffs ====
===== Quarter-finals =====
23 November 2019 First leg	Aucas	1–0	Barcelona	Quito
17:15 ECT	Figueroa 77'	Report		Stadium: Gonzalo Pozo Ripalda; Referee: Luis Espinel

27 November 2019 Second leg	Barcelona	0 - 0 (0–1 agg.)	Aucas	Guayaquil
19:45		Report		Stadium: Monumental Isidro Romero Carbo; Referee: Marlon Vera

Aucas won 0–1 on aggregate and advanced to the Semifinals.

=== Copa FEF Ecuador ===
==== Round of 32 ====
24 April 2019 First leg	Mineros	1-1	Barcelona	Guaranda
12:30 ECT	Torres 69'	Report	Vera 19'	Stadium: Estadio Federativo; Attendance: 2455; Referee: Byron Reinoso

16 May 2019 Second leg	Barcelona	2-0 (3–1 agg.)	Mineros	Guayaquil
19:30 ECT	Lastra 15'; Esterilla 18'	Report		Stadium: Monumental Banco Pichincha; Attendance: 2.424; Referee: Gorky Stalin Araujo

==== Round of 16 ====
10 July 2019 First leg	Barcelona	1 - 0	Santa Rita	Guayaquil
? ECT	L. Campana	Report		Stadium: Monumental Banco Pichincha; Attendance: 8565; Referee: Erick Ruiz

31 July 2019 Second leg	Santa Rita	2 - 1 (2-2 agg.)	Barcelona	Vinces
15:30 ECT	R. Alba 63', 90+1'	Report	F. Martínez 31' (pen.)	Stadium: Estadio 14 de Junio; Attendance: 809; Referee: Mario Romero

The aggregate score ended up in 2–2, but Barcelona won the key by the away goals rule and advanced to quarterfinals.

==== Quarter-finals ====
21 August 2019 First leg	El Nacional	1 - 1	Barcelona	Quito
19:30 ECT	J. Borja	Report	C. Alemán	Stadium: Olímpico Atahualpa; Attendance: 9772; Referee: Oscar Proaño

25 September 2019 Second leg	Barcelona	0 - 0 (1-1 agg.)	El Nacional	Guayaquil
19:30 ECT		Report		Stadium: Monumental Banco Pichincha; Attendance: 5637; Referee: José Luis Espinel

The aggregate score ended up in 1–1, but Barcelona won the key by the away goals rule and advanced to semifinals.

==== Semi-finals ====
2 October 2019 First leg	Barcelona	4 - 1	Delfín	Guayaquil
19:30 ECT	G. Marques 33'; S. Pérez 64'; J. Álvez 81'; M. Oyola 85'		S. López 39'	Stadium: Monumental Banco Pichincha; Referee: Augusto Aragón

30 October 2019 Second leg	Delfín	3 - 0 (4-4 agg.)	Barcelona	Manta
19:30 ECT	É. Caicedo 15'; C. Garcés 83' (pen.), 85'			Stadium: Jocay; Referee: Diego Lara

The aggregate score ended up in 4–4, but Barcelona lost the key by the away goals rule and Delfín advanced to the final.

=== Copa CONMEBOL Libertadores ===
Barcelona joined the competition in the second stage of the 2019 Copa Libertadores qualifying stages.

==== Second stage ====
Null match First leg	Defensor Sporting (Uruguay)	1-2	(Ecuador) Barcelona	Montevideo
	Navarro 79'	Report	Esterilla 66'; Arreaga 90+3'	Stadium: Estadio Luis Franzini; Referee: Julio Bascuñán (Chile)

- The first leg match originally ended 1–2, but CONMEBOL awarded Defensor Sporting a 3–0 win as a result of Barcelona fielding the ineligible player Sebastián Pérez Cardona.

6 February 2019 First leg	Defensor Sporting (Uruguay)	3-0	(Ecuador) Barcelona	Montevideo
18:15 UTC−3		Report		Stadium: Estadio Luis Franzini; Referee: Julio Bascuñán (Chile)

12 February 2019 Second leg	Barcelona (Ecuador)	1-0 (1-3 agg.)	(Uruguay) Defensor Sporting	Guayaquil
18:30 UTC−5	Oyola 39'	Report		Stadium: Estadio Monumental Isidro Romero Carbo; Referee: Wilmar Roldán (Colombia)

Defensor Sporting won 3–1 on aggregate and advanced to the third stage of the 2019 Copa Libertadores qualifying stages.
