= Espinel =

Espinel is a given name and a surname. Notable people with the name include:

- Eduardo Espinel (born 1972), Uruguayan football manager and former player
- Ileana Espinel (1933–2001), Ecuadorian journalist, poet and writer
- Luis Espinel (born 1967), Ecuadorian football manager and former player
- Luisa Espinel (1892–1963), American singer, dancer and actress, born Luisa Ronstadt
- Mauricio Rodas Espinel (born 1975), Ecuadorian lawyer, Metropolitan Mayor of Quito
- Vicente Espinel (1550–1624), Spanish writer and musician of the Siglo de Oro
- Victoria Espinel (born 1968), the president and CEO of The Software Alliance
- Pedro Espinel Torres (1908–1981), Peruvian composer

== See also ==
- Espin (disambiguation)
- Espinal (disambiguation)
- Espínola
