= 2019 LigaPro Serie A =

LigaPro Banco Pichincha
- Season: 2019
- Dates: 8 February – 15 December 2019
- Champions: Delfín (1st title)
- Relegated: América de Quito; Fuerza Amarilla
- Copa Libertadores: Delfín; LDU Quito; Macará; Barcelona; Independiente del Valle (via Copa Sudamericana)
- Copa Sudamericana: Universidad Católica; Aucas; Emelec; El Nacional
- Matches: 252
- Goals: 672 (2.67 per match)
- Top goalscorer: Luis Amarilla (19 goals)
- Biggest home win: U. Católica 6–0 Fuerza Amarilla (4 March)
- Biggest away win: Mushuc Runa 0–4 LDU Quito (28 April); LDU Quito 1–5 U. Católica (13 July); Fuerza Amarilla 0–4 El Nacional (22 September)
- Highest scoring: Barcelona 6–2 Dep. Cuenca (12 April); U. Católica 6–2 Técnico Universitario (5 July); Técnico Universitario 4–4 Guayaquil City (20 September)

The 2019 Campeonato Ecuatoriano de Fútbol Serie A (officially known as the LigaPro Banco Pichincha 2019 for sponsorship reasons) was the 61st season of the Serie A, Ecuador's top tier football league, and the first under the management of the Liga Profesional de Fútbol del Ecuador (or LigaPro). LDU Quito were the defending champions, but were defeated in the finals by Delfín following a scoreless draw on aggregate score after two legs and a penalty shootout, in which the latter team won their first league title.

== Format ==
Starting from this season, the league was expanded from 12 to 16 teams and a new format was implemented. The first stage will be played as a double round-robin tournament with all teams playing each other twice, once at home and once away, for a total of 30 matches. The top eight teams at the end of the first stage will qualify for the playoffs, which will consist of three rounds: quarterfinals, semifinals, and final.

In the quarterfinals, the eight qualified teams were split into four ties to be played on a home-and-away basis: the best-placed team in the first round played against the eighth-best team, the second-best team against the seventh-best, and so on. The four winners advanced to the semifinals, with the winners of this stage playing the finals. In case of a tie in points and goals scored in the quarterfinals and semifinals, the best-placed team in each tie (according to the first stage standings) advanced to the following stage, whilst in a case of a tie in points and goals for in the final, a penalty shootout would be played to decide the champion.

== Teams ==
Sixteen teams competed in the 2019 Serie A season, twelve of whom took part in the previous season. El Nacional and Guayaquil City would have been relegated from Serie A after accumulating the fewest points during the 2018 season, however, the expansion of the league prevented their relegation to Serie B. The four remaining spots in the top tier were filled by the top four teams in Serie B in the previous season: Mushuc Runa, América de Quito, Fuerza Amarilla and Olmedo.

=== Stadia and locations ===
Locations of the 2019 Serie A teams.

Team	Home city	Stadium	Capacity
América de Quito	Quito	Olímpico Atahualpa	35,258
Aucas	Quito	Gonzalo Pozo Ripalda	21,689
Barcelona	Guayaquil	Monumental Banco Pichincha	57,267
Delfín	Manta	Jocay	17,834
Deportivo Cuenca	Cuenca	Banco del Austro Alejandro Serrano Aguilar	18,549
El Nacional	Quito	Olímpico Atahualpa	35,258
Emelec	Guayaquil	Banco del Pacífico Capwell	38,963
Fuerza Amarilla	Machala	9 de Mayo	16,456
Guayaquil City	Guayaquil	Christian Benítez Betancourt	10,152
Independiente del Valle	Sangolquí	Rumiñahui	7,233
LDU Quito	Quito	Rodrigo Paz Delgado	41,575
Macará	Ambato	Bellavista	16,467
Mushuc Runa	Ambato	COAC Mushuc Runa	6,000
Olmedo	Riobamba	Olímpico	7,233
Técnico Universitario	Ambato	Bellavista	16,467
Universidad Católica	Quito	Olímpico Atahualpa	35,258

=== Personnel and kits ===
Team	Manager	Kit manufacturer	Shirt sponsor
América de Quito	(Ecuador) Darwin Veloz	Astro	Consorcio Pichincha
Aucas	(Argentina) Gabriel Schürrer	Umbro	Banco del Pacífico
Barcelona	(Uruguay) Tabaré Silva	Marathon	Pilsener
Delfín	(Argentina) Fabián Bustos	Yeliyan	Fresh Fish; La Esquina de Ales
Deportivo Cuenca	(Uruguay) Tabaré Silva	Joma	Chubb Seguros
El Nacional	(Argentina) Marcelo Zuleta	Lotto	Aceros ANDEC; Banco General Rumiñahui
Emelec	(Spain) Ismael Rescalvo	Adidas	Electrocables
Fuerza Amarilla	(Ecuador) Luis Miguel Garcés	Elohim	
Guayaquil City	(Ecuador) Pool Gavilánez	Astro	
Independiente del Valle	(Spain) Miguel Ángel Ramírez	Marathon	Chery; DirecTV
LDU Quito	(Uruguay) Pablo Repetto	Puma	Banco Pichincha
Macará	(Ecuador) Paúl Vélez	Boman	Cooperativa San Francisco Ltda.
Mushuc Runa	(Argentina) Martín Cardetti	Elohim	Cooperativa Mushuc Runa
Olmedo	(Argentina) Ricardo Dillon	Boman	Cooperativa Daquilema; GolTV
Técnico Universitario	(Colombia) José Eugenio Hernández	Boman	Cooperativa San Francisco Ltda.
Universidad Católica	(Colombia) Santiago Escobar	Umbro	Discover Card

=== Managerial changes ===
Team	Outgoing manager	Manner of departure	Date of vacancy	Position in table	Incoming manager	Date of appointment
Deportivo Cuenca	(Venezuela) Richard Páez	Resigned	12 December 2018	Pre-season	(Argentina) Luis Soler	13 December 2018
El Nacional	(Uruguay) Eduardo Favaro	End of contract	12 December 2018	Pre-season	(Argentina) Marcelo Zuleta	21 December 2018
Aucas	(Argentina) Darío Tempesta	Sacked	18 December 2018	Pre-season	(Uruguay) Eduardo Favaro	22 December 2018
Barcelona	(Uruguay) Guillermo Almada	Signed by Santos Laguna	12 April 2019	5th	(Ecuador) José Gavica (caretaker)	13 April 2019
Emelec	(Argentina) Mariano Soso	Resigned	14 April 2019	10th	(Ecuador) Bolívar Vera (caretaker)	16 April 2019
Barcelona	(Ecuador) José Gavica	End of caretaker spell	21 April 2019	5th	(Uruguay) Leonardo Ramos	22 April 2019
Independiente del Valle	(Spain) Ismael Rescalvo	Signed by Emelec	26 April 2019	1st	(Ecuador) Yuri Solano (caretaker)	26 April 2019
Aucas	(Uruguay) Eduardo Favaro	Sacked	28 April 2019	7th	(Argentina) Gabriel Schürrer	1 May 2019
Emelec	(Ecuador) Bolívar Vera	End of caretaker spell	30 April 2019	9th	(Spain) Ismael Rescalvo	30 April 2019
Técnico Universitario	(Argentina) Fabián Frías	Sacked	30 April 2019	14th	(Colombia) José Eugenio Hernández	2 May 2019
Independiente del Valle	(Ecuador) Yuri Solano	End of caretaker spell	7 May 2019	1st	(Spain) Miguel Ángel Ramírez	7 May 2019
América de Quito	(Ecuador) Francisco Correa	Resigned	13 May 2019	16th	(Ecuador) Luis Espinel	16 May 2019
Deportivo Cuenca	(Argentina) Luis Soler	Sacked	14 May 2019	11th	(Ecuador) Jerson Stacio (caretaker)	14 May 2019
Fuerza Amarilla	(Paraguay) Raúl Duarte	Sacked	21 May 2019	15th	(Paraguay) Diego Torres (caretaker)	21 May 2019
Deportivo Cuenca	(Ecuador) Jerson Stacio	End of caretaker spell	25 May 2019	10th	(Uruguay) Tabaré Silva	30 May 2019
Fuerza Amarilla	(Paraguay) Diego Torres	End of caretaker spell	25 May 2019	15th	(Italy) Matías Tatangelo	24 June 2019
Mushuc Runa	(Ecuador) Geovanny Cumbicus	Sacked	28 May 2019	13th	(Argentina) Martín Cardetti	30 May 2019
América de Quito	(Ecuador) Luis Espinel	Resigned	24 September 2019	15th	(Ecuador) Darwin Veloz	25 September 2019
Fuerza Amarilla	(Italy) Matías Tatangelo	Resigned	27 September 2019	16th	(Ecuador) Luis Miguel Garcés	9 October 2019
Barcelona	(Uruguay) Leonardo Ramos	Resigned	30 October 2019	3rd	(Chile) Nelson Tapia (caretaker)	31 October 2019
Barcelona	(Chile) Nelson Tapia	End of caretaker spell	4 November 2019	2nd	(Uruguay) Tabaré Silva	4 November 2019

== First stage ==
The First stage began on February 8 and ended on November 3. The top eight teams at the end of this stage advanced to the playoffs, while the bottom two were relegated.

Pos	Team	Pld	W	D	L	GF	GA	GD	Pts	Qualification or relegation
1	Macará	30	17	11	2	47	16	+31	62	Advance to Playoffs
2	Barcelona	30	17	4	9	55	38	+17	55	Advance to Playoffs
3	Universidad Católica	30	16	5	9	48	29	+19	53	Advance to Playoffs
4	Delfín	30	15	8	7	46	33	+13	53	Advance to Playoffs
5	Independiente del Valle	30	15	7	8	41	29	+12	52	Advance to Playoffs
6	LDU Quito	30	13	10	7	46	30	+16	49	Advance to Playoffs
7	Aucas	30	14	7	9	48	44	+4	49	Advance to Playoffs
8	Emelec	30	14	4	12	43	30	+13	46	Advance to Playoffs
9	El Nacional (Note: El Nacional were deducted one point for failing to submit their payrolls and social security contributions to the IESS for the month of August.)	30	13	6	11	41	34	+7	44	
10	Deportivo Cuenca (Note: Deportivo Cuenca were deducted one point for failing to submit their payrolls and social security contributions to the IESS for the month of May.)	30	12	7	11	44	46	−2	42	
11	Olmedo	30	9	7	14	34	44	−10	34	
12	Guayaquil City	30	8	7	15	35	48	−13	31	
13	Mushuc Runa	30	8	6	16	36	58	−22	30	
14	Técnico Universitario	30	8	5	17	40	60	−20	29	
15	América de Quito (R)	30	6	7	17	26	41	−15	25	Relegation to Serie B
16	Fuerza Amarilla (Note: Fuerza Amarilla were deducted four points for failing to submit their payrolls and social security contributions to the IESS, and one additional point for failing to submit their payrolls and social security contributions to the IESS for the month of May.) (R)	30	2	5	23	24	74	−50	6	Relegation to Serie B

Source: LigaPro, Soccerway
Rules for classification: 1) Points, 2) Goal difference, 3) Goals for, 4) Away goals for, 5) Head-to-head record, 6) Drawing of lots.
(R) Relegated

=== Results ===
Home \ Away	AME	AUC	BAR	DEL	CUE	NAC	EME	FAM	GUA	IDV	LDQ	MAC	MUS	OLM	TEC	CAT
América de Quito	—	1–1	2–2	1–1	3–0 (Note: Match awarded 3–0 to América de Quito due to Deportivo Cuenca being suspended by FEF.)	1–3	1–2	3–0 (Note: Match awarded 3–0 to América de Quito due to Fuerza Amarilla being suspended by FEF.)	3–0	1–1	0–1	0–1	0–1	1–1	2–0	1–0
Aucas	3–0	—	3–4	4–2	1–0	0–0	0–2	2–1	4–2	2–1	2–1	0–0	1–1	1–0	1–0	3–1
Barcelona	4–0	2–1	—	3–1	6–2	5–2	0–3	2–1	1–0	4–1	1–1	0–2	2–0	2–0	0–1	1–2
Delfín	2–1	4–2	1–2	—	2–0	1–1	0–0	1–0	0–1	0–1	2–1	1–1	1–0	4–0	4–2	2–1
Deportivo Cuenca	2–0	1–2	1–1	2–3	—	2–2	1–0	3–0	2–0	3–2	1–0	1–2	3–1	2–1	4–3	1–2
El Nacional	0–1	1–3	1–0	0–1	1–1	—	1–0	3–0	2–1	4–2	2–2	1–2	2–0	1–1	1–2	0–1
Emelec	3–0 (Note: The match, which originally ended 0–0, was awarded 3–0 to Emelec due to América de Quito fielding the suspended player Onofre Mejía. Although a decision by LigaPro's Committee of Appeals overrode this ruling and restored the original score, on 10 September 2019 the Court of Arbitration for Sport accepted the appeal filed by Emelec, awarding the match to the aforementioned club.)	2–1	0–1	0–1	0–1	2–1	—	1–2	2–1	1–3	1–1	1–0	6–1	3–1	1–0	1–0
Fuerza Amarilla	3–0	3–3	0–3	0–2	2–2	0–4	1–4	—	0–1	0–1	1–1	0–3	1–2	1–4	2–2	1–2
Guayaquil City	1–1	1–1	0–2	1–3	1–2	0–1	1–0	1–1	—	0–1	1–0	1–1	4–2	3–0	3–1	2–1
Independiente del Valle	0–0	4–0	3–0	0–0	2–0	1–0	1–0	2–0	2–2	—	0–1	0–2	2–3	2–1	1–0	2–1
LDU Quito	1–0	0–1	2–0	1–1	2–2	2–0	2–1	5–2	4–0	1–1	—	1–1	4–0	3–2	0–0	1–5
Macará	1–0	3–0	0–0	1–1	1–1	0–1	2–1	5–1	2–0	1–1	3–0	—	1–1	1–1	2–0	1–0
Mushuc Runa	2–1	1–2	5–1	2–0	1–1	0–1	0–2	3–0	3–2	0–2	0–4	1–1	—	1–4	3–4	1–1
Olmedo	1–0	2–1	1–2	2–2	2–1	0–2	3–1	1–0	1–1	1–0	0–2	0–2	1–1	—	0–2	0–0
Técnico Universitario	3–2	3–2	0–3	1–2	1–2	0–2	2–2	2–1	4–4	1–1	0–2	0–2	3–0	0–3	—	1–2
Universidad Católica	1–0	1–1	2–1	2–1	2–0	3–1	1–1	6–0	1–0	0–1	0–0	1–3	1–0	2–0	6–2	—

Source: LigaPro, Soccerway
Legend: Blue = home team win; Yellow = draw; Red = away team win.

== Playoffs ==
Quarter-finals
7	Aucas	1	0	1
2	Barcelona	0	0	0
6	LDU Quito	2	2	4
3	Universidad Católica	3	0	3
5	Independiente del Valle	0	2	2
4	Delfín (bsr)	0	2	2
8	Emelec	1	2	3
1	Macará (bsr)	2	1	3

Semi-finals
7	Aucas	1	0	1
6	LDU Quito	3	0	3
4	Delfín	2	1	3
1	Macará	1	1	2

Finals
6	LDU Quito	0	0	0 (1)
4	Delfín (p)	0	0	0 (2)

=== Quarter-finals ===
Team 1	Agg.	Team 2	1st leg	2nd leg
Emelec	3–3 (bsr)	Macará	1–2	2–1
Aucas	1–0	Barcelona	1–0	0–0
LDU Quito	4–3	Universidad Católica	2–3	2–0
Independiente del Valle	2–2 (bsr)	Delfín	0–0	2–2

==== First leg ====
23 November 2019	Aucas	1–0	Barcelona	Quito
17:15	Figueroa 77'	Report		Stadium: Gonzalo Pozo Ripalda; Referee: Luis Espinel

23 November 2019	LDU Quito	2–3	Universidad Católica	Quito
19:30	Valencia 90'; Rodríguez 90+4'	Report	Amarilla 13', 61', 62'	Stadium: Rodrigo Paz Delgado; Referee: Marlon Vera

24 November 2019	Emelec	1–2	Macará	Guayaquil
16:00	Godoy 16'	Report	J. Corozo 43'; Estrada 77'	Stadium: George Capwell; Referee: Roberto Sánchez

24 November 2019	Independiente del Valle	0–0	Delfín	Sangolquí
18:15		Report		Stadium: Rumiñahui; Referee: Carlos Orbe

==== Second leg ====
27 November 2019	Universidad Católica	0–2 (3–4 agg.)	LDU Quito	Quito
17:30		Report	Guerra 48'; J. Julio 58'	Stadium: Olímpico Atahualpa; Referee: Roberto Sánchez

27 November 2019	Barcelona	0–0 (0–1 agg.)	Aucas	Guayaquil
19:45		Report		Stadium: Monumental Isidro Romero Carbo; Referee: Marlon Vera

28 November 2019	Delfín (bsr)	2–2 (2–2 agg.)	Independiente del Valle	Manta
15:30	Noboa 7'; Ordóñez 16'	Report	Torres 19', 41'	Stadium: Jocay; Referee: Luis Espinel

28 November 2019	Macará (bsr)	1–2 (3–3 agg.)	Emelec	Ambato
19:30	De la Cruz 84' (pen.)	Report	Caicedo 45'; Pernía 80'	Stadium: Bellavista; Referee: Diego Lara

=== Semi-finals ===
Team 1	Agg.	Team 2	1st leg	2nd leg
Delfín	3–2	Macará	2–1	1–1
Aucas	1–3	LDU Quito	1–3	0–0

==== First leg ====
30 November 2019	Aucas	1–3	LDU Quito	Quito
19:00	Figueroa 64'	Report	J. Julio 20'; A. Julio 23'; Martínez Borja 39'	Stadium: Gonzalo Pozo Ripalda; Referee: Guillermo Guerrero

1 December 2019	Delfín	2–1	Macará	Manta
17:00	Garcés 10' (pen.); Piñatares 64'	Report	M. Corozo 61'	Stadium: Jocay; Referee: Marlon Vera

==== Second leg ====
7 December 2019	Macará	1–1 (2–3 agg.)	Delfín	Ambato
16:00	M. Corozo 66'	Report	Ordóñez 53'	Stadium: Bellavista; Referee: Guillermo Guerrero

7 December 2019	LDU Quito	0–0 (3–1 agg.)	Aucas	Quito
19:00		Report		Stadium: Rodrigo Paz Delgado; Referee: Luis Espinel

=== Finals ===
11 December 2019
19:30

LDU Quito	0–0	Delfín
	Report

Estadio Rodrigo Paz Delgado, Quito
Referee: Marlon Vera

15 December 2019
15:00

Delfín	0–0	LDU Quito
	Report
Penalties
López (penalty scored); Piñatares (penalty missed); L. Cangá (penalty scored); Noboa (penalty missed); Garcés (penalty missed)	2–1	(penalty scored) Alcívar; (penalty missed) Valencia; (penalty missed) Caicedo; (penalty missed) Ayoví; (penalty missed) Martínez Borja

Estadio Jocay, Manta
Referee: Roberto Sánchez

Tied 0–0 on aggregate, Delfín won on penalties.

Campeonato Ecuatoriano de Fútbol
2019 Serie A champions

1st title

== International qualification ==
Pos	Team	Pld	W	D	L	GF	GA	GD	Pts	Qualification
1	Macará	30	17	11	2	47	16	+31	62	Qualification for Copa Libertadores second stage
2	Barcelona	30	17	4	9	55	38	+17	55	Qualification for Copa Libertadores first stage
3	Universidad Católica	30	16	5	9	48	29	+19	53	Qualification for Copa Sudamericana first stage
4	Delfín (C)	30	15	8	7	46	33	+13	53	Qualification for Copa Libertadores group stage
5	Independiente del Valle	30	15	7	8	41	29	+12	52	Qualification for Copa Libertadores group stage (Note: Independiente del Valle qualified for the Copa Libertadores group stage by winning the 2019 Copa Sudamericana.)
6	LDU Quito	30	13	10	7	46	30	+16	49	Qualification for Copa Libertadores group stage
7	Aucas	30	14	7	9	48	44	+4	49	Qualification for Copa Sudamericana first stage
8	Emelec	30	14	4	12	43	30	+13	46	Qualification for Copa Sudamericana first stage
9	El Nacional (Note: El Nacional were deducted one point for failing to submit their payrolls and social security contributions to the IESS for the month of August.)	30	13	6	11	41	34	+7	44	Qualification for Copa Sudamericana first stage (Note: El Nacional qualified for the Copa Sudamericana first stage since the Copa Ecuador top four as well as the league top eight were already qualified for international competition.)
10	Deportivo Cuenca (Note: Deportivo Cuenca were deducted one point for failing to submit their payrolls and social security contributions to the IESS for the month of May.)	30	12	7	11	44	46	−2	42	
11	Olmedo	30	9	7	14	34	44	−10	34	
12	Guayaquil City	30	8	7	15	35	48	−13	31	
13	Mushuc Runa	30	8	6	16	36	58	−22	30	
14	Técnico Universitario	30	8	5	17	40	60	−20	29	
15	América de Quito	30	6	7	17	26	41	−15	25	
16	Fuerza Amarilla (Note: Fuerza Amarilla were deducted four points for failing to submit their payrolls and social security contributions to the IESS, and one additional point for failing to submit their payrolls and social security contributions to the IESS for the month of May.)	30	2	5	23	24	74	−50	6	

Source: LigaPro, Soccerway
Rules for classification: 1) Points, 2) Goal difference, 3) Goals for, 4) Away goals for, 5) Head-to-head record, 6) Drawing of lots.
(C) Champions

== Top goalscorers ==
Rank	Name	Club	Goals
1	(Paraguay) Luis Amarilla	Universidad Católica	19
2	(Argentina) Raúl Becerra	Deportivo Cuenca	18
3	(Ecuador) Michael Estrada	Macará	17
4	(Ecuador) Fidel Martínez	Barcelona	16
5	(Ecuador) Carlos Garcés	Delfín	14
5	(Uruguay) Gonzalo Mastriani	Guayaquil City	14
5	(Argentina) Bruno Vides	Universidad Católica	14
8	(Uruguay) Rodrigo Aguirre	LDU Quito	12
9	(Ecuador) Jonathan Borja	El Nacional	11
10	(Ecuador) Roberto Ordóñez	Delfín	10
10	(Argentina) Muriel Orlando	Olmedo	10

Source: Soccerway

== See also ==
- Ecuadorian Serie A
- 2019 in Ecuadorian football
- 2019 Ecuadorian Serie B
- 2019 Súperliga Femenina
- 2019 Ecuadorian Women's Serie B
