= Espinal (surname) =

Espinal is a Spanish surname. Notable people with the surname include:

- Amaya Espinal (born 1999), Dominican-American nurse, model and contestant of reality show Love Island
- Flavio Dario Espinal (born 1957), Dominican jurist, political scientist, diplomat and academic
- Jaime Espinal (born 1984), Puerto Rican sport wrestler
- José Espinal (born 1982), Dominican footballer
- Luís Espinal Camps (1932–1980), Spanish missionary to Bolivia
- Marcos Espinal, Dominican physician
- Panya Clark Espinal (born 1965), Canadian sculptor
- Rafael Espinal, American politician
- Ramón Tapia Espinal (1926–2002), Dominican lawyer and politician
- Raynel Espinal (born 1991) Dominican professional baseball player
- Santiago Espinal (born 1994), Dominican professional baseball player
- Vinicio Espinal (born 1982), Dominican footballer

== See also ==
- Espinal (disambiguation)
