= 2019 in Ecuadorian football =

Football in Ecuador
- Season: 2019

Men's football
- Serie A: Delfín S.C.
- Serie B: 2019
- Copa Ecuador: L.D.U. Quito

Women's football
- Superliga Serie A: C.D. Cuenca

The 2019 season was the 61st season of competitive association football in Ecuador.

== National teams ==
=== Ecuador national football team ===
==== Friendly matches ====
21 March Friendly	United States	1–0	Ecuador	Orlando, United States
20:00 EDT (UTC−4)	Zardes 81'	Report		Stadium: Orlando City Stadium; Attendance: 17,422; Referee: David Gantar (Canada)

26 March Friendly	Honduras	0–0	Ecuador	Harrison, United States
20:00 EDT (UTC−4)		Report		Stadium: Red Bull Arena; Referee: Jaime Fernando Fernández (Mexico)

1 June Friendly	Venezuela	1–1	Ecuador	Miami Gardens, United States
20:30 EDT (UTC−4)	Rosales 38' (pen.)	Report	E. Valencia 90+1'	Stadium: Hard Rock Stadium; Attendance: 12,021; Referee: Keylor Herrera (Costa Rica)

9 June Friendly	Mexico	3–2	Ecuador	Arlington, United States
19:00 CST (UTC−6)	Dos Santos 28'; Montes 63'; L. Rodríguez 77'	Report	Mena 47'; Preciado 66'	Stadium: AT&T Stadium; Attendance: 59,000; Referee: David Gantar (Canada)

5 September Friendly	Peru	0–1	Ecuador	Harrison, United States
20:00 EDT (UTC−4)		Report	Castillo 47'	Stadium: Red Bull Arena; Attendance: 21,428; Referee: Armando Villarreal (United States)

10 September Friendly	Ecuador	3–0	Bolivia	Cuenca, Ecuador
20:00 ECT (UTC–5)	Estrada 49'; Sornoza 72' (pen.); Plata 86'	Report		Stadium: Estadio Alejandro Serrano Aguilar; Referee: Nicolas Gallo (Colombia)

13 October Friendly	Ecuador	1–6	Argentina	Alicante, Spain
	Mena 49'	Report	Alario 20'; Espinoza 27' (o.g.); Paredes 32' (pen.); Pezzella 66'; Domínguez 82'; Ocampos 86'	Stadium: Estadio Manuel Martínez Valero; Referee: Luca Barbeno (San Marino)

14 November Friendly	Ecuador	3–0	Trinidad and Tobago	Portoviejo, Ecuador
	Franco 29'; E. Valencia 71' (pen.), 85'	Report		Stadium: Estadio Reales Tamarindos; Referee: Kevin Ortega (Peru)

19 November Friendly	Ecuador	0–1	Colombia	Harrison, United States
20:00 (UTC–5)		Report	Uribe 42'	Stadium: Red Bull Arena; Referee: Juan Calderón (Costa Rica)

==== 2019 Copa América ====
===== Group C =====
Pos	Team	Pld	W	D	L	GF	GA	GD	Pts	Qualification
1	Uruguay	3	2	1	0	7	2	+5	7	Advance to knockout stage
2	Chile	3	2	0	1	6	2	+4	6	Advance to knockout stage
3	Japan	3	0	2	1	3	7	−4	2	
4	Ecuador	3	0	1	2	2	7	−5	1	

Source: CONMEBOL

16 June 2019	Uruguay	4–0	Ecuador	Estádio Mineirão, Belo Horizonte
19:00	Lodeiro 6'; Cavani 33'; Suárez 44'; Mina 78' (o.g.)	Report		Attendance: 13,611; Referee: Anderson Daronco (Brazil)

21 June 2019	Ecuador	1–2	Chile	Itaipava Arena Fonte Nova, Salvador
20:00	E. Valencia 26' (pen.)	Report	Fuenzalida 8'; Sánchez 51'	Attendance: 14,727; Referee: Patricio Loustau (Argentina)

24 June 2019	Ecuador	1–1	Japan	Estádio Mineirão, Belo Horizonte
20:00	Mena 35'	Report	Nakajima 15'	Attendance: 7,623; Referee: Jesús Valenzuela (Venezuela)

=== Ecuador national under-20 football team ===
==== 2019 South American U-20 Championship ====
===== Group B =====
Pos	Team	Pld	W	D	L	GF	GA	GD	Pts	Qualification
1	Ecuador	4	3	0	1	8	4	+4	9	Final stage
2	Argentina	4	2	1	1	3	2	+1	7	Final stage
3	Uruguay	4	2	0	2	4	3	+1	6	Final stage
4	Paraguay	4	1	1	2	2	5	−3	4	
5	Peru	4	1	0	3	2	5	−3	3	

Source: CONMEBOL

18 January 2019	Ecuador	3–0	Paraguay	Estadio Fiscal, Talca
17:10	Rezabala 9', 44'; Alvarado 57' (pen.)	Report		Referee: Gery Vargas (Bolivia)

20 January 2019	Uruguay	3–1	Ecuador	Estadio La Granja, Curicó
19:30	Dávila 30', 45+3'; Schiappacasse 90+3'	Report	Campana 34'	Referee: Raphael Claus (Brazil)

22 January 2019	Argentina	0–1	Ecuador	Estadio Fiscal, Talca
17:10		Report	Alvarado 54'	Referee: Gery Vargas (Bolivia)

24 January 2019	Peru	1–3	Ecuador	Estadio La Granja, Curicó
17:10	Mora 24'	Report	Rezabala 8'; Alvarado 18'; Campana 58'	Referee: Raphael Claus (Brazil)

===== Final stage =====
Pos	Team	Pld	W	D	L	GF	GA	GD	Pts	Qualification
1	Ecuador	5	3	1	1	6	2	+4	10	2019 FIFA U-20 World Cup & 2019 Pan American Games
2	Argentina	5	3	0	2	7	4	+3	9	2019 FIFA U-20 World Cup & 2019 Pan American Games
3	Uruguay	5	2	2	1	6	5	+1	8	2019 FIFA U-20 World Cup & 2019 Pan American Games
4	Colombia	5	1	2	2	2	2	0	5	2019 FIFA U-20 World Cup
5	Brazil	5	1	2	2	3	5	−2	5	

Source: CONMEBOL

29 January 2019	Ecuador	2–1	Argentina	Estadio El Teniente, Rancagua
19:50	Campana 37'; Cifuentes 73'	Report	Almada 26'	Referee: Arnaldo Samaniego (Paraguay)

1 February 2019	Ecuador	0–1	Uruguay	Estadio El Teniente, Rancagua
19:50		Report	Batista 61' (pen.)	Referee: Gery Vargas (Bolivia)

4 February 2019	Ecuador	1–0	Colombia	Estadio El Teniente, Rancagua
19:50	Campana 90+4'	Report		Referee: Piero Maza (Chile)

7 February 2019	Ecuador	0–0	Brazil	Estadio El Teniente, Rancagua
19:50		Report		Referee: Ivo Méndez (Bolivia)

10 February 2019	Venezuela	0–3	Ecuador	Estadio El Teniente, Rancagua
19:50		Report	Campana 2' (pen.), 31'; Segura 90'	Referee: Arnaldo Samaniego (Paraguay)

==== 2019 FIFA U-20 World Cup ====
===== Group B =====
Pos	Team	Pld	W	D	L	GF	GA	GD	Pts	Qualification
1	Italy	3	2	1	0	3	1	+2	7	Advance to knockout stage
2	Japan	3	1	2	0	4	1	+3	5	Advance to knockout stage
3	Ecuador	3	1	1	1	2	2	0	4	Advance to knockout stage
4	Mexico	3	0	0	3	1	6	−5	0	

Source: FIFA
Rules for classification: Group stage tiebreakers

23 May 2019 Group B	Japan	1–1	Ecuador	Bydgoszcz Stadium, Bydgoszcz
20:30	Yamada 68'	Report	Tagawa 45' (o.g.)	Attendance: 3,018; Referee: Slavko Vinčić (Slovenia)

26 May 2019 Group B	Ecuador	0–1	Italy	Bydgoszcz Stadium, Bydgoszcz
18:00		Report	Pinamonti 15'	Attendance: 6,717; Referee: Adham Makhadmeh (Jordan)

29 May 2019 Group B	Ecuador	1–0	Mexico	Gdynia Stadium, Gdynia
18:00	Plata 12'	Report		Attendance: 4,208; Referee: Ivan Kružliak (Slovakia)

===== Knockout stage =====
3 June 2019 Round of 16	Uruguay	1–3	Ecuador	Lublin Stadium, Lublin
17:30	R. Araújo 11'	Report	Alvarado 31' (pen.); Quintero 75'; Plata 83' (pen.)	Attendance: 10,562; Referee: Michael Oliver (England)

8 June 2019 Quarter-finals	United States	1–2	Ecuador	Gdynia Stadium, Gdynia
17:30	Weah 36'	Report	Cifuentes 30'; Espinoza 43'	Attendance: 6,389; Referee: Benoît Bastien (France)

11 June 2019 Semi-finals	Ecuador	0–1	South Korea	Lublin Stadium, Lublin
20:30		Report	Choi Jun 39'	Attendance: 12,614; Referee: Michael Oliver (England)

14 June 2019 3rd place	Italy	0–1 (a.e.t.)	Ecuador	Gdynia Stadium, Gdynia
20:30		Report	Mina 104'	Attendance: 8,937; Referee: Jesús Gil Manzano (Spain)

=== Ecuador national under-23 football team ===
==== 2019 Pan American Games ====
===== Group A =====
Pos	Team	Pld	W	D	L	GF	GA	GD	Pts	Qualification
1	Mexico	3	2	1	0	4	1	+3	7	Knockout stage
2	Argentina	3	2	0	1	7	5	+2	6	Knockout stage
3	Panama	3	0	2	1	2	4	−2	2	Fifth place match
4	Ecuador	3	0	1	2	3	6	−3	1	Seventh place match

Source: Lima 2019
Rules for classification: Tie-breakers

29 July 2019 Group A	Ecuador	2–3	Argentina	Estadio Universidad San Marcos
13:00	Rezabala 75'; Naula 89'	Report	Valenzuela 33'; Gaich 40', 76'	Referee: Gustavo Murillo (Colombia)

1 August 2019 Group A	Panama	1–1	Ecuador	Estadio Universidad San Marcos
10:00	Zúñiga 27'	Report	Campana 53'	Referee: Miguel Santibañez (Peru)

4 August 2019 Group A	Ecuador	0–2	Mexico	Estadio Universidad San Marcos
13:00		Report	Vásquez 25'; Lainez 90+5'	Referee: Wagner Magalhães (Brazil)

7 August 2019 7th place	Ecuador	1–1 (2–4 p)	Peru	Estadio Universidad San Marcos
10:00	Vivar 88'	Report	Minda 83' (o.g.)	Referee: José Argote (Venezuela)
	Penalties
	Vallecilla (penalty scored); Alcivar (penalty missed); Porozo (penalty scored); Minda (penalty missed)		(penalty missed) Barco; (penalty scored) Acuy; (penalty scored) Arakaki; (penalty scored) Pretell; (penalty scored) Rivera

== Men's football ==
=== 2019 Campeonato Ecuatoriano de Fútbol ===
League	Promoted to league	Relegated from league
Serie A	Mushuc Runa S.C.; América de Quito; Fuerza Amarilla S.C.; C.D. Olmedo	No relegated clubs
Serie B	C.D. Independiente Juniors; Atlético Porteño	Gualaceo S.C.; C.D. Clan Juvenil
Segunda Categoría	—N/a	—N/a

==== Serie A ====
===== First stage =====
Pos	Team	Pld	W	D	L	GF	GA	GD	Pts	Qualification or relegation
1	Macará	30	17	11	2	47	16	+31	62	Advance to Playoffs
2	Barcelona	30	17	4	9	55	38	+17	55	Advance to Playoffs
3	Universidad Católica	30	16	5	9	48	29	+19	53	Advance to Playoffs
4	Delfín	30	15	8	7	46	33	+13	53	Advance to Playoffs
5	Independiente del Valle	30	15	7	8	41	29	+12	52	Advance to Playoffs
6	LDU Quito	30	13	10	7	46	30	+16	49	Advance to Playoffs
7	Aucas	30	14	7	9	48	44	+4	49	Advance to Playoffs
8	Emelec	30	14	4	12	43	30	+13	46	Advance to Playoffs
9	El Nacional (Note: El Nacional were deducted one point for failing to submit their payrolls and social security contributions to the IESS for the month of August.)	30	13	6	11	41	34	+7	44	
10	Deportivo Cuenca (Note: Deportivo Cuenca were deducted one point for failing to submit their payrolls and social security contributions to the IESS for the month of May.)	30	12	7	11	44	46	−2	42	
11	Olmedo	30	9	7	14	34	44	−10	34	
12	Guayaquil City	30	8	7	15	35	48	−13	31	
13	Mushuc Runa	30	8	6	16	36	58	−22	30	
14	Técnico Universitario	30	8	5	17	40	60	−20	29	
15	América de Quito (R)	30	6	7	17	26	41	−15	25	Relegation to Serie B
16	Fuerza Amarilla (Note: Fuerza Amarilla were deducted four points for failing to submit their payrolls and social security contributions to the IESS, and one additional point for failing to submit their payrolls and social security contributions to the IESS for the month of May.) (R)	30	2	5	23	24	74	−50	6	Relegation to Serie B

Source: LigaPro, Soccerway
Rules for classification: 1) Points, 2) Goal difference, 3) Goals for, 4) Away goals for, 5) Head-to-head record, 6) Drawing of lots.
(R) Relegated

===== Play-offs =====
Quarter-finals
7	Aucas	1	0	1
2	Barcelona	0	0	0
6	LDU Quito	2	2	4
3	Universidad Católica	3	0	3
5	Independiente del Valle	0	2	2
4	Delfín (bsr)	0	2	2
8	Emelec	1	2	3
1	Macará (bsr)	2	1	3

Semi-finals
7	Aucas	1	0	1
6	LDU Quito	3	0	3
4	Delfín	2	1	3
1	Macará	1	1	2

Finals
6	LDU Quito	0	0	0 (1)
4	Delfín	0	0	0 (2)

==== Serie B ====
===== Aggregate table =====
Pos	Team	Pld	W	D	L	GF	GA	GD	Pts	Qualification or relegation
1	Orense S.C.	36	19	11	6	57	26	+31	68	Advance to Playoffs
2	C.D. Independiente Juniors	36	19	9	8	48	29	+19	66	Advance to Playoffs
3	L.D.U. Portoviejo	36	14	17	5	49	23	+26	59	Advance to Playoffs
4	Manta F.C.	36	16	11	9	48	31	+17	59	Advance to Playoffs
5	C.D.S. Santa Rita (Note: Santa Rita were deducted one point for failing to submit their payrolls and social security contributions to the IESS for the month of May.)	36	15	15	6	39	22	+17	59	
6	Gualaceo S.C. (Note: Gualaceo were deducted one point for failing to submit their payrolls and social security contributions to the IESS for the month of September.)	36	13	12	11	35	17	+18	50	
7	Atlético Porteño	36	10	12	14	35	36	−1	42	
8	Atlético Santo Domingo	36	11	8	17	32	41	−9	41	
9	L.D.U. Loja (Note: L.D.U. Loja were deducted one point for failing to submit their payrolls and social security contributions to the IESS for the month of September.) (R)	36	7	8	21	32	63	−31	28	Relegation to Segunda Categoría
10	C.D. Clan Juvenil (Note: Clan Juvenil were deducted fourteen points for failing to submit their payrolls and social security contributions to the IESS for several months. Due to financial reasons the club lost the category.) (R)	36	3	3	30	12	86	−74	0	Relegation to Segunda Categoría

Source: LigaPro, Soccerway
Rules for classification: 1) Points, 2) Goal difference, 3) Goals for, 4) Away goals for, 5) Head-to-head record, 6) Drawing of lots.
(R) Relegated

===== Play-offs =====
Semi-finals
1	Orense	2	2	4
4	Manta	2	1	3
2	Independiente Juniors	1	0	1
3	L.D.U. Portoviejo	2	0	2

Finals
1	Orense	2	2	4
3	L.D.U. Portoviejo	1	2	3

==== Segunda Categoría ====
===== Final stage =====
Pos	Team	Pld	W	D	L	GF	GA	GD	Pts	Qualification	9OC	CHA	OTA	ESM
1	9 de Octubre	4	3	0	1	9	4	+5	9	Promoted to 2020 Ecuadorian Serie B	—	2–0	3–1	
2	Chacaritas F.C.	4	2	1	1	5	5	0	7	Promoted to 2020 Ecuadorian Serie B	3–2	—		1–0
3	Esmeraldas F.C.	4	1	2	1	6	5	+1	5			1–1	—	3–0
4	Otavalo F.C.	4	0	1	3	1	7	−6	1		0–2		1–1	—
