= Espin =

Espin may refer to:

- Espin (crater) on the Moon
- Espin (protein)
- Espin (surname)
- eSPIN, a social networking service; see eCRUSH
