= Yuri Solano =

Ecuadorian football manager (born 1980)

Personal information
- Full name: Yuri Fernando Solano Sánchez
- Date of birth: 21 September 1980 (age 46)
- Place of birth: Loja, Ecuador

Managerial career
- Years: Team
- 2015–2017: Rostov (technical assistant)
- 2017–2018: Rubin (technical assistant)
- 2019: Independiente del Valle
- 2020: Independiente del Valle (youth)
- 2023: 9 de Octubre

Yuri Fernando Solano Sánchez (born 21 September 1980) is an Ecuadorian football manager who last managed 9 de Octubre.

== Life and career ==
Solano was born on 21 September 1980 in Loja, Ecuador. He is a native of Loja, Ecuador. He studied electrical engineering in Russia. He has worked as a translator in Russia. He has been married. He obtained a UEFA Pro License. In 2015, he was appointed as a technical assistant of Russian side Rostov. In 2017, he was appointed as a technical assistant of Russian side Rubin.

In 2019, he was appointed manager of Ecuadorian side Independiente del Valle. In 2020, he was appointed as a youth manager of Ecuadorian side Independiente del Valle. He managed the club's under-18 team. He also managed their reserve team. He helped them win the 2020 U-20 Copa Libertadores. In 2023, he was appointed manager of Ecuadorian side 9 de Octubre.
