= Espinal =

Espinal, Spanish for spine, may refer to:

== People ==
- Espinal (surname)

== Places ==
- Argentine Espinal, an ecoregion in Argentina
- Espinal, Navarre, Spain
- Espinal, Veracruz, Mexico
- El Espinal, Oaxaca, Mexico
- El Espinal, Tolima, Colombia
