= Espínola =

Surname list

Espínola is Spanish surname, which may refer to:

- Arnaldo Espínola, Paraguayan footballer
- Carlos Espínola (sailor), Argentine windsurfer and politician
- Carlos González Espínola, Paraguayan footballer
- Darío Espínola, Argentine footballer
- Ernesto Espinola, Paraguayan chess player
- Juan Espínola (footballer), Paraguayan footballer
- Lourdes Espinola, Paraguayan poet, diplomat, cultural promoter
- María Espínola, Argentine windsurfer
- Néstor Espínola, Argentine footballer
- Víctor Espínola, Paraguayan multi-instrumentalist and singer
