= Espin (surname) =

Espin or Espín is a surname. Notable people with the surname include:

- Alejandro Castro Espín (born 1965), Cuban political and military figure
- Juan Valera Espín (born 1984), Spanish footballer
- T. H. E. C. Espin (1858–1934), British astronomer
- Vilma Espín (1930–2007), Cuban revolutionary
