= Marcos Espinal =

Marcos Espinal is currently the Director of the Department of Communicable Diseases and Health Analysis at the Pan American Health Organization (PAHO), Regional Office for the Americas of the World Health Organization (WHO). Dr Espinal's portfolio includes several areas of work: neglected, tropical & vector-borne diseases; risk and outbreak communication; HIV, Hepatitis, Tuberculosis & STIs; health information & analysis; water & sanitation, and veterinary public health.

== Biography ==
=== Education ===
Espinal, a national of the Dominican Republic, holds a medical degree from the Universidad Autónoma de Santo Domingo, Dominican Republic (1985); he is a pediatrician, with three years of residency at the Robert Reid Children's Hospital of Santo Domingo, Dominican Republic. He obtained a master's degree in public health (1990) and a doctorate in public health (1995) from the University of California at Berkeley School of Public Health.

=== Career ===
Espinal's work experience includes positions in the Ministry of Health of the Dominican Republic and the National Center for Research on Maternal and Child Health; the New York City Public Health Department; and the WHO. Before joining PAHO, Espinal served as Executive Secretary of the WHO Stop TB Partnership, a global movement aiming at the elimination of TB as a public health problem. Espinal has published more than 100 publications in the field of communicable diseases and is a recipient of the Scientific Prize of the International Union against Tuberculosis and Lung Disease, the Albert and Mildred Krueger Memorial Fellowship, and a graduate scholarship from the John E. Fogarty International Center. In 2007, Espinal was awarded the Walter and Elise A. Hass International Award by the University of California at Berkeley for a distinguished record of service in international health; and in 2012, he was awarded the Princess Chichibu Memorial TB Global Award by the Japan Anti-Tuberculosis Association.
