= Leonardo Campana =

Ecuadorian footballer (born 2000)

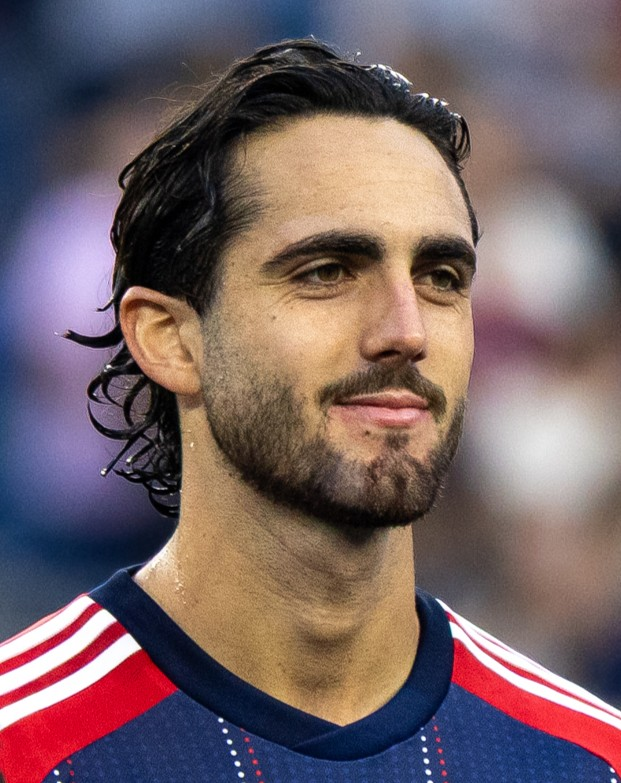
- Campana with the New England Revolution in 2025

Personal information
- Full name: Leonardo Campana Romero
- Date of birth: 24 July 2000 (age 26)
- Place of birth: Guayaquil, Ecuador
- Height: 1.87 m (6 ft 2 in)
- Position: Forward

Team information
- Current team: New England Revolution
- Number: 9

Youth career
- 2016–2019: Barcelona SC

Senior career*
Years	Team	Apps	(Gls)
2016–2020	Barcelona SC	16	(3)
2020–2023	Wolverhampton Wanderers	0	(0)
2020–2021	→ Famalicão (loan)	9	(2)
2021	→ Grasshoppers (loan)	14	(3)
2022	→ Inter Miami (loan)	26	(11)
2023–2024	Inter Miami	54	(17)
2025–	New England Revolution	26	(8)

International career^{‡}
2019	Ecuador U20	16	(6)
2019–2020	Ecuador U23	6	(1)
2019–	Ecuador	20	(1)
Medal record
Men's football
Representing Ecuador
South American U-20 Championship
Winner	2019 Chile
FIFA U-20 World Cup
Third place	2019 Poland
- * Club domestic league appearances and goals as of 21 March 2026 ‡ National team caps and goals as of 18 November 2025

Leonardo Campana Romero (born 24 July 2000) is an Ecuadorian professional footballer who plays as a forward for Major League Soccer club New England Revolution and the Ecuador national team.

== Club career ==
=== Barcelona SC ===
Campana began his career with Barcelona SC in 2016. He scored his first professional goal on 21 April 2019 against Delfín de Manta.

=== Wolverhampton ===
On 21 January 2020, Campana moved to English Premier League club Wolverhampton Wanderers in a three-and-a-half-year deal.

=== Famalicão ===
On 19 September, Campana joined Primeira Liga side, Famalicão, on a season long loan. He made his debut for Famalicão on 28 September 2020, being substituted for Rubén del Campo in a 2–1 victory over Belenenses SAD. He scored his first goal for Famalicão on 22 April 2021, during a 3–0 victory versus Gil Vicente.

=== Grasshoppers ===
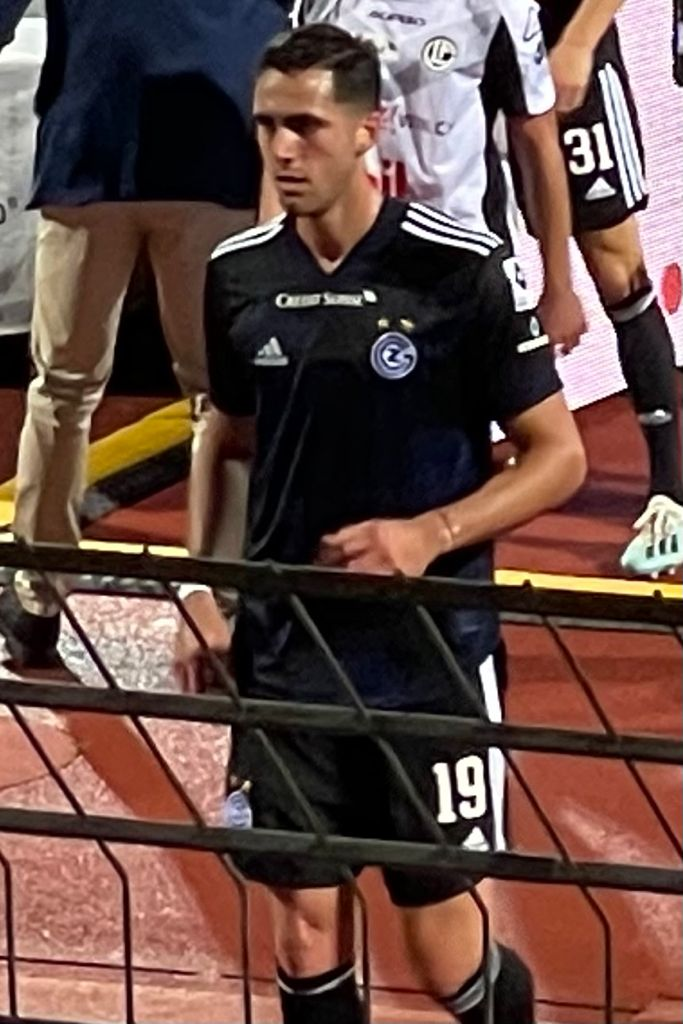
Leo Campana with Grasshopper in 2021

On 16 July 2021, Campana joined Swiss Super League side Grasshoppers on a season-long loan deal. His first appearance for the Swiss side came in a 2–0 defeat against Basel, where he conceded an own goal.

=== Inter Miami ===
On 20 January 2022, it was announced that Campana would join Major League Soccer club Inter Miami on a season-long loan. He made his debut for Inter Miami on 26 February 2022, starting in a 0–0 draw versus Chicago Fire FC. Campana scored his first goal for Inter Miami on 6 March 2022, their only goal in a 5–1 loss to Austin FC. Campana was named MLS Player of the Week for Week 6 of the 2022 season on 11 April 2022, for his hat trick against the New England Revolution. Campana signed with Miami on a permanent basis on 20 January 2023. He occupied a Young Designated Player roster slot and was signed through the end of the 2025 season, with a club option to extend through 2026.

On 19 August 2023, Inter Miami won the 2023 Leagues Cup in penalties, with Campana scoring the third penalty after getting subbed on for Josef Martínez.

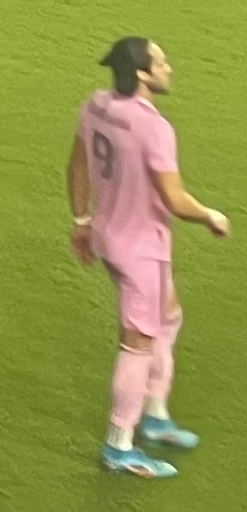
Campana in the 2023 U.S. Open Cup

Campana scored two goals assisted by Lionel Messi in the 2023 U.S. Open Cup semifinal on 24 August as Inter Miami advanced to their second final of the season, which they lost against the Houston Dynamo 2–1.

=== New England Revolution ===
On 19 December 2024, Campana was traded by Inter Miami to fellow MLS club New England Revolution in a record-breaking domestic deal. Inter Miami received $2.5 million general allocation money with an additional $750,000 if Campana reached certain performance bonuses. Inter Miami also received an additional international roster slot, and a sell on percentage in exchange for Campana. The previous MLS domestic transfer record record was from January 2022 when FC Dallas sent $2 million to D.C. United for Paul Arriola. Campana made his Revolution debut, and recorded his first start for the Revolution, in the 2025 season opener, a 0–0 draw against Nashville SC on 22 February. He scored his first Revolution goal on 19 April in a 2–0 win over NYCFC.

== International career ==
Campana started to gather attention at the 2019 South American U-20 Championship where he scored six goals in nine games as Ecuador were crowned champions.

== Personal life ==
Campana is the son of former professional tennis player turned politician Pablo Campana, who much after representing Ecuador at the 1996 Olympics became Minister of Commerce in the Ecuadorean government of Lenin Moreno. His great-grandfather, Gabriel, won six Ecuadorian league winners' medals in the 1920s, and his grandfather, Isidro Romero, was the president of Barcelona Sporting Club for 15 years and the team's stadium in Guayaquil, where Campana used to play, is named after him. He is a relative of President of Ecuador, Daniel Noboa Azin, through his grandmother, Isabel Noboa. He is also a citizen of the United States.

== Career statistics ==
=== Club ===
As of match played 21 March 2026

Appearances and goals by club, season and competition
Club	Season	League			National cup (Note: Includes Copa Ecuador, Taça de Portugal, Swiss Cup and U.S. Open Cup)		Continental		Other		Total	
Club	Season	Division	Apps	Goals	Apps	Goals	Apps	Goals	Apps	Goals	Apps	Goals
Barcelona SC	2019	Ecuadorian Serie A	16	3	5	1	—		—		21	4
Wolverhampton Wanderers	2019–20	Premier League	0	0	—		—		—		0	0
Famalicão (loan)	2020–21	Primeira Liga	9	2	1	0	—		—		10	2
Grasshoppers (loan)	2021–22	Swiss Super League	14	3	1	0	—		—		15	3
Inter Miami (loan)	2022	MLS	26	11	2	1	—		—		28	12
Inter Miami	2023	MLS	26	9	4	2	—		7 (Note: Appearances in Leagues Cup)	0	37	11
Inter Miami	2024	MLS	28	8	—		1 (Note: Appearance in CONCACAF Champions Cup)	0	6 (Note: Four appearances and one goal in Leagues Cup, two appearances in MLS Cup playoffs)	1	35	9
Inter Miami	Total		80	28	6	3	1	0	13	1	100	32
New England Revolution	2025	MLS	24	7	0	0	—		—		24	7
New England Revolution	2026	MLS	2	1	0	0	—		0	0	2	1
New England Revolution	Total		26	8	0	0	—		0	0	26	8
Career total			145	44	13	4	1	0	13	1	172	49

=== International ===
As of match played 18 November 2025

Appearances and goals by national team and year
National team	Year	Apps	Goals
Ecuador	2019	4	0
Ecuador	2020	1	0
Ecuador	2021	5	0
Ecuador	2022	2	0
Ecuador	2023	3	0
Ecuador	2024	1	0
Ecuador	2025	4	1
Total		20	1

Scores and results list Ecuador's goal tally first.

List of international goals scored by Leonardo Campana
No.	Date	Venue	Opponent	Score	Result	Competition
1	18 November 2025	Sports Illustrated Stadium, Harrison, United States	New Zealand	2–0	2–0	Friendly

== Honours ==
Inter Miami

- Supporters' Shield: 2024
- Leagues Cup: 2023

Ecuador

- South American U-20 Championship: 2019
- FIFA U-20 World Cup third place: 2019

Individual

- South American U-20 Championship top scorer: 2019
