= Flavio Dario Espinal =

Dominican jurist, political scientist, diplomat and academic (born 1957)

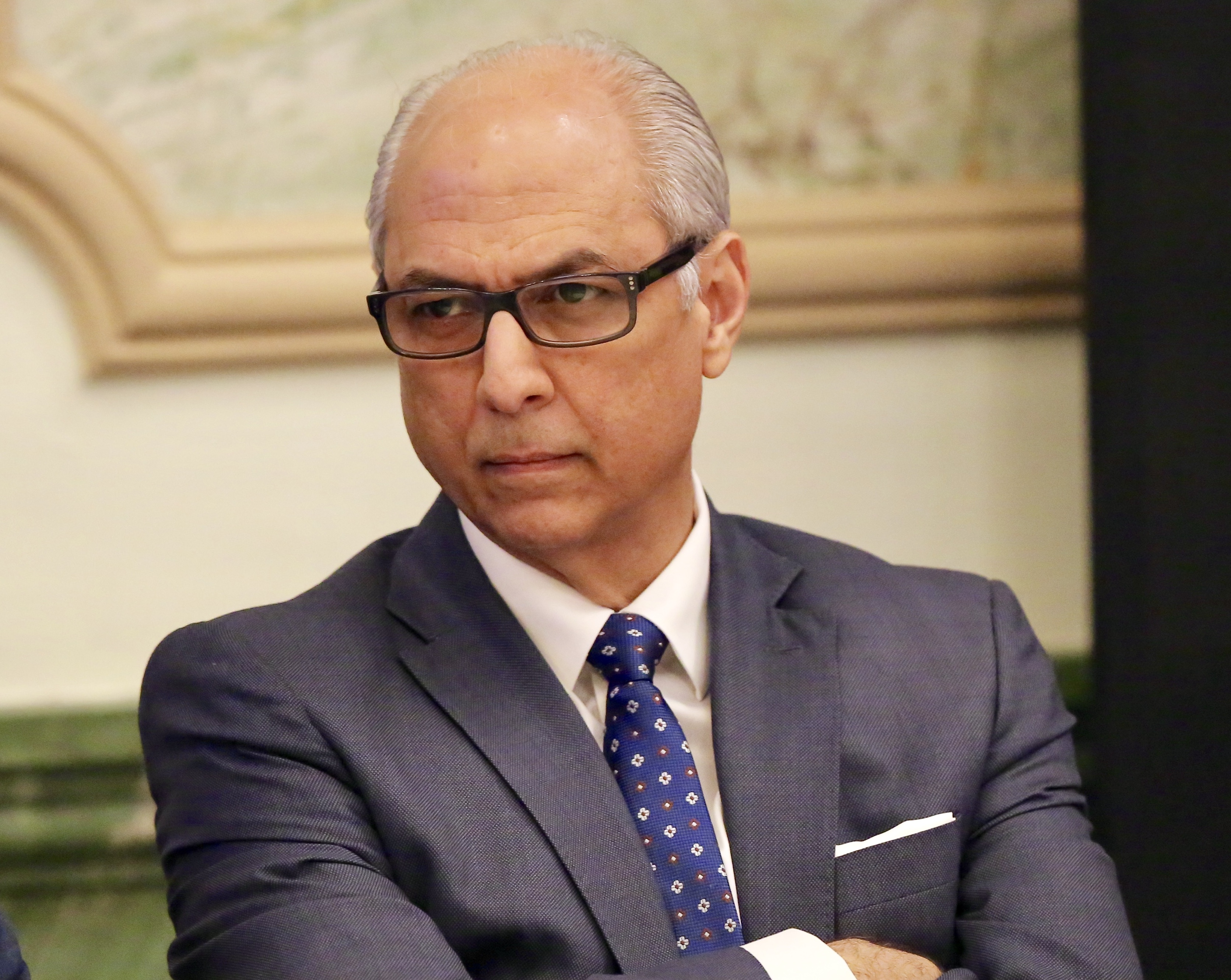

Chief Legal Advisor
- In office August 16, 2016 – August 16, 2020
- President: Danilo Medina
- Preceded by: Cesar Pina Toribio
- Succeeded by: Antoliano Peralta

Dominican Republic Ambassador to the United States of America
- In office November 23, 2004 – March 25, 2009
- President: Leonel Fernández
- Preceded by: Hugo Guilliani Cury
- Succeeded by: Roberto Saladín

Dominican Republic Ambassador to the Organization of American States
- In office November 22, 1996 – August 16, 2000
- President: Leonel Fernández
- Preceded by: Dario Suro García-Godoy
- Succeeded by: Ramón Quiñones

Personal details
- Born: July 22, 1957 (age 69) Santiago de los Caballeros
- Spouse: Minerva del Risco
- Children: 2 daughters
- Education: University of Virginia; Essex University; PUCMM
- Profession: Attorney & Diplomat

Flavio Darío Espinal (born July 22, 1957 in Santiago de los Caballeros) is a Dominican jurist, political scientist, diplomat and academic. He was the legal advisor to the President of the Dominican Republic from 2016 to 2020.

He previously served as ambassador of the Dominican Republic to the Organization of American States (OAS) between 1997 and 2000 and to the government of the United States of America between 2004 and 2009.

He has been a representative of the Dominican State before the Inter-American Commission on Human Rights, the Inter-American Court of Human Rights, as well as in international litigations and arbitrations.

== Education & private practice ==
Dr. Flavio Darío Espinal's background is in legal and political sciences. He holds a law degree (Summa cum laude) from Pontificia Universidad Católica Madre y Maestra PUCMM (1980) in the Dominican Republic, a master's degree in Government from Essex University (1985), in the United Kingdom, and a doctoral degree (PhD) in Government from the University of Virginia (1996), in the United States. Espinal has written widely about constitutional law issues.

He also completed negotiation programs for lawyers of the Harvard University School of Law. During his studies, he received several internationally recognized scholarships, including the LASPAU-Fulbright scholarship and the Bradley Foundation, the Dupont Foundation and the Institute for the Study of World politics.

He has been a consultant for private sector companies, as well as for the Inter-American Development Bank (IDB), the United Nations Development Project (UNDP), and the Organization of American States (OAS). He was part of the law firm Squire Sanders & Dempsey, Peña Prieto Gamundi.

He was a member of the Committee of Jurists appointed by the executive branch for the preparation of the draft text which served as the basis for the Constitution proclaimed by the National Congress in January 2010, as well as a member for the adaptation of national legislation to the new Constitution.

In addition, he was one of the jurists responsible for drafting Law 169-14 promoted by the president of the Dominican Republic in response to sentence 168-13 of the Constitutional Court of 2013 which created an imminent risk on the right to nationality of descendants of foreigners born in the Dominican Republic between 1929 and 2007. By adopting this law, it was possible to protect these people and ensure recognition of rights to others. Mediante la adopción de esta ley fue posible proteger a estas personas y asegurar reconocimiento de derechos a otras.

He is a founding partner of the law firm Flavio Darío Espinal & Asociados.

== Academic career ==
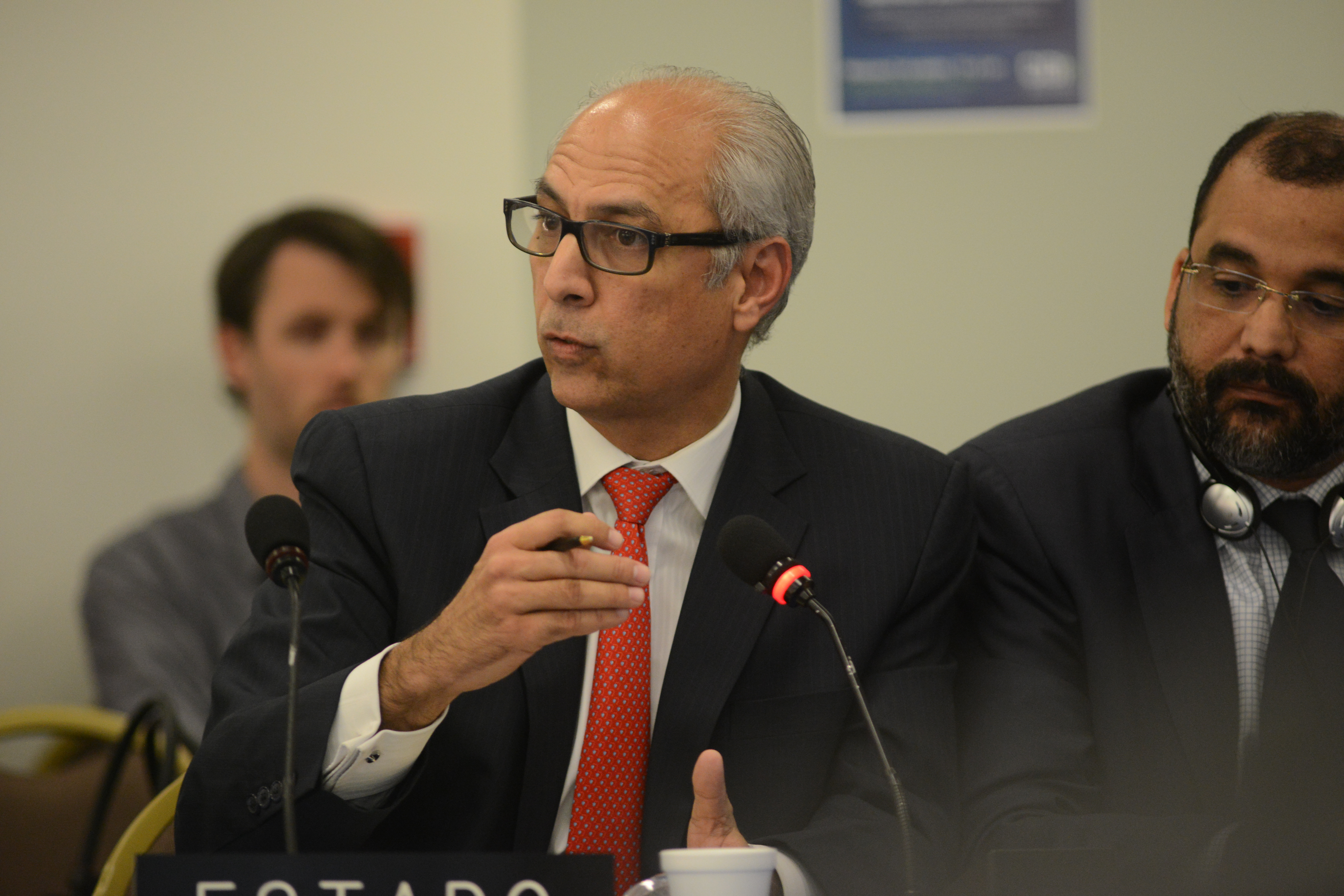
Flavio Darío Espinal in November 2015 in Washington, D.C.

Dr. Espinal was the Founding Director of the University Center for Political and Social Studies (CUEPS), Founding Director of the Center for the Study, Prevention and Resolution of Conflicts (CEPREC) and Director of the Law School of the Pontificia Universidad Católica Madre y Maestra (PUCMM).

He is a professor of Constitutional Law, Administrative Law and Public International Law. His book Constitutionalism and Political Processes in the Dominican Republic received the "Pedro Henríquez Ureña" Annual Essay Prize.

He has published numerous articles and essays on constitutional and political issues in different academic bodies of the country and abroad, as well as being a lecturer on issues of constitutional law, political systems, and international relations.

Espinal is a founding member of the Institutional and Justice Foundation, Inc. (FINJUS).

== Public service ==
=== Ambassador to the Organization of American States (1996-2000) ===
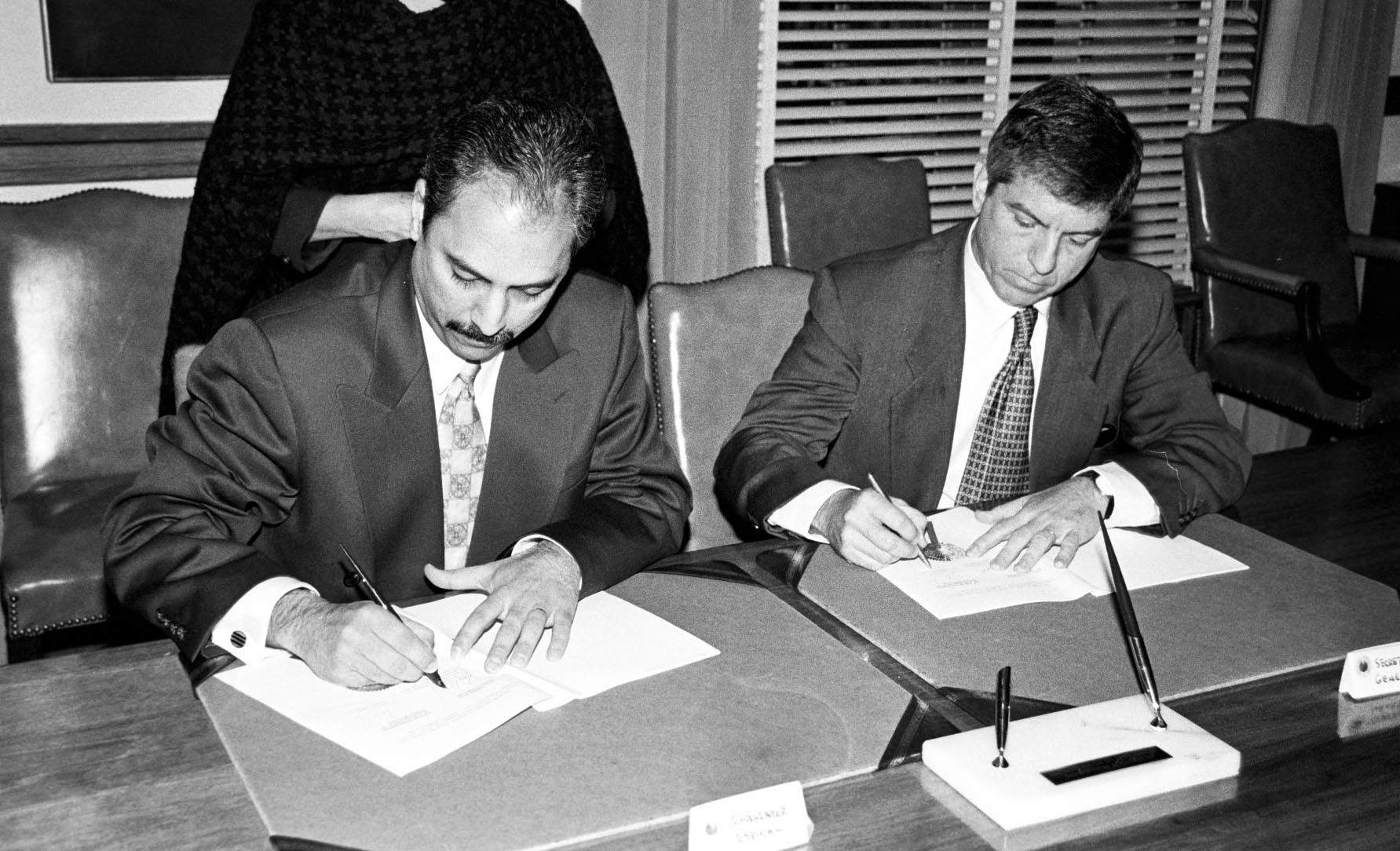
Flavio Darío Espinal and the Secretary-General of the OAS sign an agreement in March 2000 in Washington, D.C.

He was appointed Ambassador, Permanent Representative of the Dominican Republic to the Organization of American States on November 22, 1996. A few days after his arrival at the OAS, he assumed the pro tempore presidency of the Permanent Council, a responsibility for which he displayed qualities of leadership that, along with his management oriented to the resolution of conflicts through inclusive dialogue, earned him the esteem of his colleagues and the appreciation of the then Secretary General César Gaviria, former president of Colombia.

Valuing his academic training both in the legal and political sciences, in the context of his multilateral resourcefulness, the Permanent Representatives of the OAS member countries unanimously promoted him to the presidency of the Committee on Juridical and Political Affairs, and to the presidency of the Committee on Hemispheric Security. He was also the coordinator for the participation of civil society in the framework of the Summits of the Americas.

Through Espinal, in the participation before the political organs of the OAS, the Dominican Republic has always established its commitment and respect for the protection and promotion of human rights, and the importance of continuing to work in favor of strengthening the system and the relevance of maintaining an open and permanent dialogue between the organs of the inter-American system and the member states.

During his tenure, he promoted the acceptance of the jurisdiction of the Inter-American Court of Human Rights in the Dominican Republic. When the Dominican Constitutional Court annulled said jurisdiction in October 2014, he was critical of this decision and claimed the importance of the Inter-American Human Rights System.

=== Ambassador to the United States of America (2004-2009) ===
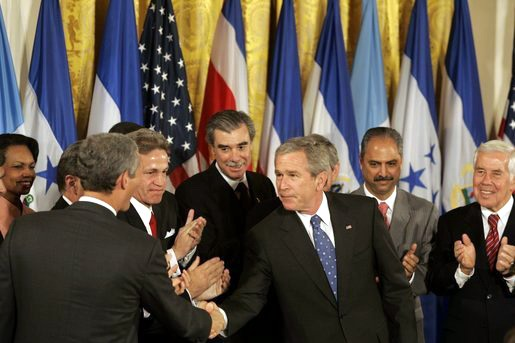
Flavio Darío Espinal with President George Bush and other ambassadors after the signing of DR-CAFTA

Dr. Flavio Darío Espinal served as Ambassador Extraordinary and Plenipotentiary of the Dominican Republic to the government of the United States of America during the period from November 23, 2004 to March 25, 2009. He presented credentials on March 9, 2005.

The tenure of Ambassador Espinal stood out as a result of a strategic, effective and innovative dynamism that contributed to the strengthening of the bilateral relations of the Dominican Republic and the United States of America. His initiatives were aimed at achieving greater projection and advancing the interests of the Dominican Republic in different areas, particularly in the political, economic and cultural spheres, recognizing the priority nature of the relations with the United States, due to their commercial interests, cultural linkages, common challenges (especially in matters of security), and the presence of more than one million citizens of Dominican origin.

A fundamental pillar of his mission as ambassador was to strengthen the ties of support and collaboration with the Dominican community residing in that country, making the protection of their rights more robust, facilitating the contributions of this community in the development of the Dominican Republic, as well strengthening their political and representative capabilities, promoting the cultural values, and professional, entrepreneurial, artistic, sport and academic talent, of a community which today represents the fifth largest Latino group in the US.

Ambassador Espinal played a proactive and extensive role lobbying, along with representatives of government and private sector of the Member Countries, to ensure the ratification of the Agreement by the United States Congress, and its subsequent implementation, thus consolidating preferential access to the US and Central American markets, which allowed for the continuous development of the country's export processing zone industry, generating new potential sectors, in synergy, as a regional bloc.

Under his tenure, the Embassy of the Dominican Republic developed and implemented effective strategies, with concrete results, for the promotion and facilitation of trade and investment, including the promotion of the country as a privileged tourist destination for the North American market, of the quality of the world-famous Dominican cigars and cocoa, supporting the national export sector in fulfilling import requirements and strengthening their trade capacity. Through lobbying and implementing initiatives, including expedited procedures, with the Administration and Congress, he sought to deepen preferences between both countries, a concrete example being the implementation of a Limited Supply List regarding textiles, thus improving the competitiveness of the manufacturers of certain garments. Similarly, during his leadership, the Mission held the coordination of the Washington Working Group (USDOS, IDB, OAS, ECLAC, embassies and strategic partners) to successfully host the Fourth Ministerial Meeting of Pathway to Prosperity in the Americas and the V Competitiveness Forum of the Americas in the Dominican Republic.

His work included developing relations with a wide range of relevant agencies and institutions of the US government, including the Department of Energy, which allowed the incorporation of the DR into regional initiatives in the field of renewable energy; Department of Agriculture, which close collaboration was essential to significantly increase the level of compliance with import standards and requirements, and facilitating the country’s efforts to obtain necessary certifications such as that required for the export of meat; USAID, working on strategic impact sectors; Ex-Im Bank, highlighting the importance of adequate financing to increase trade and investment; and the Federal Aviation Agency, on withdrawing the country from category 3 list, which would allow the flight of commercial aircraft with national registration to the United States.

As one of the strategic pillars of Ambassador Espinal’s tenure in Washington, DC, security cooperation with the United States of America deepened around a new framework in which the Dominican Republic played a regional leadership role, to face together, in coordination and around the concept of shared responsibility, the fight against common threats to peace and security, by transnational organized crime, trafficking of drugs, of illegal arms, of people, terrorism, among others.

During his term in office, Ambassador Espinal developed strong relations with the Dominican community through organizations in different parts of the United States, particularly on the east coast of the country, including Florida, Maryland, New York, New Jersey, Rhode Island, Connecticut and Massachusetts, where the largest proportion of Dominicans reside. Two were the fundamental purposes around the protection of their rights and advancement of their interests: first, to support the efforts that allow the development of a political voice and space in the United States, corresponding to the quantitative and qualitative relevance of the Dominican diaspora in that country; and second, to facilitate the means for this community to continue strengthening ties and contributing to the development of the Dominican Republic, not only through remittances, a fundamental element of the Dominican economy, but through the great contributions of Dominicans in different areas, including academia, professional arena, business, sports, technology and the arts.

Ambassador Espinal, renowned academic, jurist, constitutionalist and political scientist, participated frequently as a panelist in different institutions, including the Inter-American Dialogue, Council of the Americas, The Heritage Foundation, Brookings Institution, Georgetown University, George Washington University, among others, becoming a reference. These connections provided greater visibility for the Dominican Republic.

=== Legal Advisor of the Executive Branch (2016-2020) ===
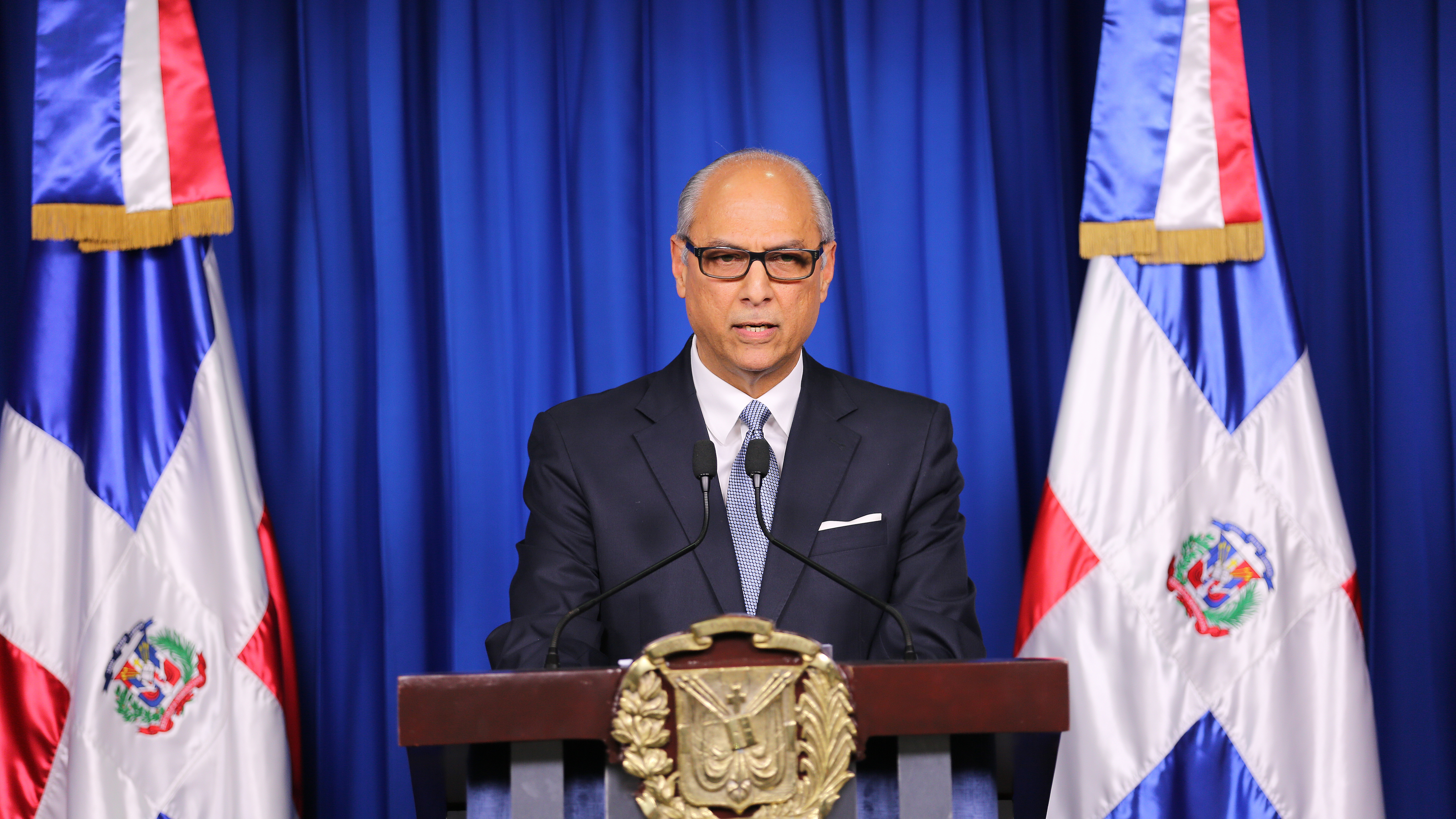
Flavio Darío Espinal in November 2018 in Santo Domingo

On August 16, 2016, el Dr. Espinal was appointed by presidential decree as Legal Advisor to the President of the Dominican Republic. In this capacity, he participated in the decision-making processes on legal, national and international policy issues, providing assistance and support to the President of the Dominican Republic and to multiple dependencies of the Dominican government.

On December 28, 2018, he was proposed to the National Council of the Magistrature by the Institutional and Justice Foundation (FINJUS) to be President of the Supreme Court of Justice of the Dominican Republic. On February 28, 2019, Dr. Espinal thanked the proposal and declined to be evaluated for that position.
