= Tabaré Silva =

Uruguayan footballer and manager (born 1974)

Personal information
- Full name: Tabaré Abayubá Silva Aguilar
- Date of birth: 30 August 1974 (age 52)
- Place of birth: Mercedes, Uruguay
- Height: 1.74 m (5 ft 9 in)
- Position: Defender

Team information
- Current team: Progreso (manager)

Senior career*
Years	Team	Apps	(Gls)
1993–1998	Defensor Sporting	107	(10)
1998–2001	Sevilla	59	(0)
2001–2002	Levante	9	(0)
2002–2003	Elche	?	(?)
2004	Central Español	12	(0)
2005–2006	River Plate Montevideo	56	(0)
2007	Rampla Juniors	4	(0)
2008–2009	Sud América	19	(0)
2008	→ Villa Española (loan)	3	(0)

International career
1994–2000	Uruguay	20	(0)

Managerial career
- 2010: Sud América
- 2010–2011: El Tanque Sisley
- 2012–2013: Defensor Sporting
- 2014: Oriente Petrolero
- 2015: Deportivo Quito
- 2015: Real Garcilaso
- 2016: Aucas
- 2018: Real Garcilaso
- 2019: Deportivo Cuenca
- 2019: Barcelona SC (interim)
- 2022: Carlos Stein
- 2025: Cerro
- 2026–: Progreso
Medal record
Representing Uruguay
Copa América
Winner	1995 Uruguay
- * Club domestic league appearances and goals

Tabaré Abayubá Silva Aguilar (born 30 August 1974) is a Uruguayan football manager and former player who played as a defender. He is the current manager of Progreso.

== Playing career ==
Silva started his playing career in 1993 with Defensor Sporting Club, he soon won a call up to the Uruguay national team and in 1995 he was part of the team that won the Copa América. He also played in 1997 Copa América.

In 1998, he moved to Spain where he played for Sevilla, Levante and Elche.

In 2003, he returned to Uruguay where he played for a number of different teams, including Central Español, Sud América, River Plate de Montevideo, Rampla Juniors and Villa Española.

== International career ==
Silva made his debut for the Uruguay national football team on 19 October 1994 in a friendly match against Peru (0–1 win) at the Estadio Nacional José Díaz in Lima, Peru. He earned a total number of 19 caps for his native country between 1994 and 2000, scoring no goals.

== Coaching career ==
Silva debuted as a manager with Sud América in 2010.

On 26 June 2012, it was announced that he will coach his favourite team: Defensor Sporting.

== Honours ==
=== Club ===
Defensor

- Uruguayan Primera División : 1994 (Clausura), 1995 (Liguilla Pre Libertadores), 1997 (Clausura)

Sevilla

- Segunda División: 2000–01

=== International ===
Uruguay

- Copa América: Copa América
