= Roberto Ordóñez =

Ecuadorian footballer (born 1985)

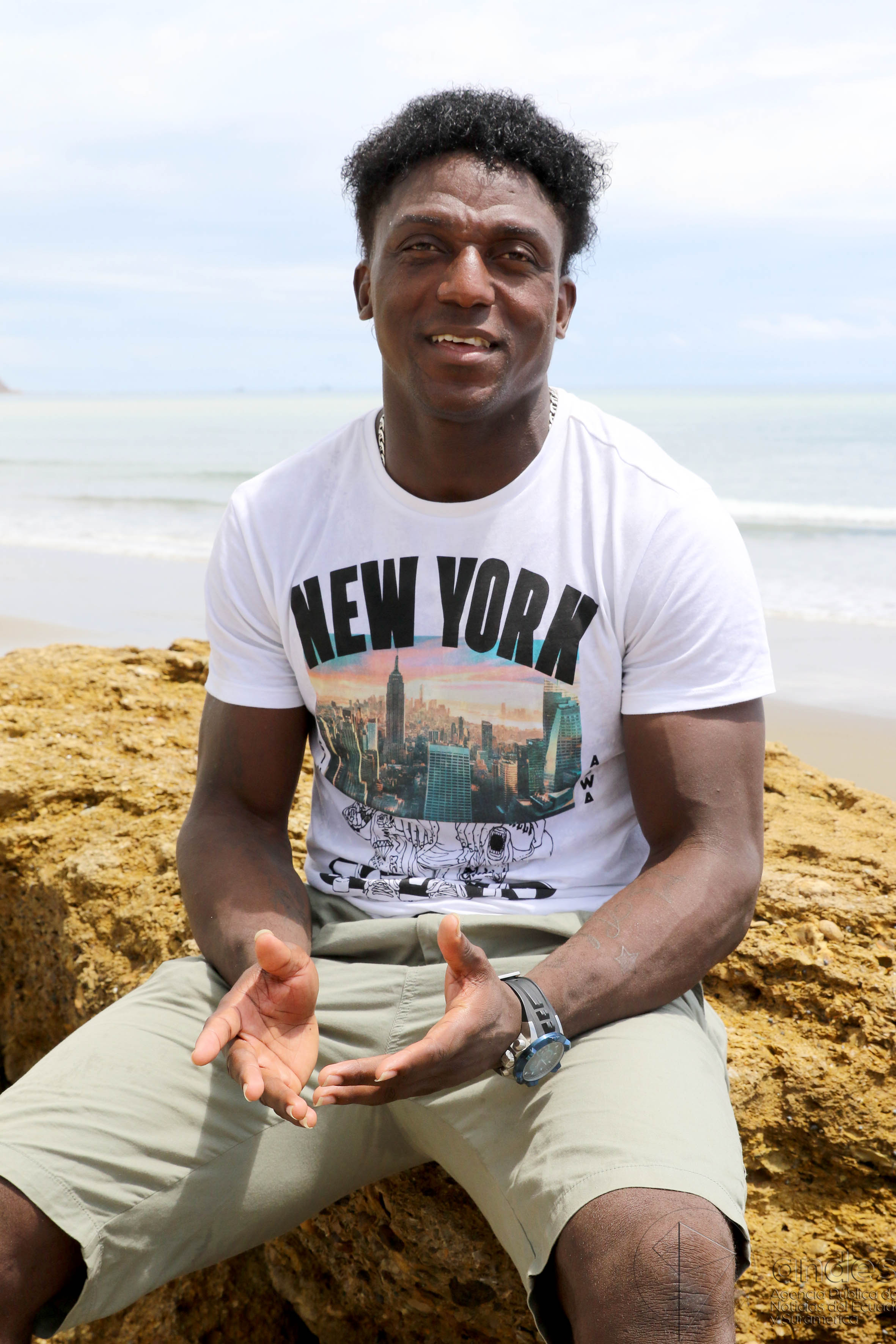
- Ordóñez in 2017

Personal information
- Full name: Roberto Javier Ordóñez Ayoví
- Date of birth: 4 May 1985 (age 41)
- Place of birth: Guayaquil, Ecuador
- Height: 1.80 m (5 ft 11 in)
- Position: Forward

Team information
- Current team: Aucas

Senior career*
Years	Team	Apps	(Gls)
2004–2005	ESPOLI	19	(8)
2007	Manta	22	(3)
2008–2009	L.D.U. Loja	31	(7)
2010	Técnico Universitario	33	(8)
2011	Aucas	27	(16)
2012	Rocafuerte	37	(9)
2013–2014	River Ecuador	74	(17)
2015	Mushuc Runa	36	(12)
2016	Cimarrones de Sonora	15	(5)
2016	Fuerza Amarilla	20	(10)
2017–2020	Delfín	88	(27)
2020	Emelec	4	(3)
2021–	Aucas	0	(0)

International career^{‡}
2017–	Ecuador	2	(0)
- * Club domestic league appearances and goals as of 20:21, 16 July 2020 (UTC) ‡ National team caps and goals as of 18 October 2018

Roberto Javier Ordóñez Ayoví (born 4 May 1985) is an Ecuadorian player, currently plays for S.D. Aucas.

== International career ==
Ordóñez made his debut for Ecuador on 5 October 2017 against Chile.
