= Luis Espinel =

Ecuadorian footballer and manager (born 1967)

Personal information
- Full name: Luis Fernando Espinel Lalama
- Date of birth: 30 June 1967 (age 59)
- Place of birth: Quito, Ecuador

Team information
- Current team: Búhos ULVR (manager)

Senior career*
Years	Team	Apps	(Gls)
1987	LDU Quito		
1992	Universidad Católica		

Managerial career
- 2007–2010: Ecuador (assistant)
- 2010–2012: Ecuador U20 (assistant)
- 2012: El Nacional (assistant)
- 2012: Imbabura
- 2013: LDU Portoviejo
- 2014: Macará
- 2014–2015: Imbabura
- 2016: Manta
- 2017: Mushuc Runa
- 2017: Imbabura
- 2018: Clan Juvenil
- 2019: América de Quito
- 2020–2021: Cumbayá
- 2021: Deportivo Quito
- 2021: Olmedo
- 2022: Cumbayá
- 2023–: Búhos ULVR
- * Club domestic league appearances and goals

Luis Fernando Espinel Lalama (born 30 June 1967) is an Ecuadorian football manager and former player. He is the current manager of Búhos ULVR.

== Coaching career ==
Born in Quito, Espinel was Sixto Vizuete's assistant at the Ecuador national team, the Ecuador under-20 national team and El Nacional before being named manager of Imbabura in the Serie B in October 2012. He left the post nearly one month later, however.

Espinel was in charge of LDU Portoviejo during the 2013 campaign, and was appointed manager of Macará in January 2014. He left the club in April, and returned to Imbabura in November for the last three rounds of the season; he narrowly avoided relegation with the club, and left in December 2015 after a comfortable mid-table finish.

Named at the helm of Manta for the 2016 campaign, Espinel left the club in August. He was presented as manager of Mushuc Runa in January 2017, but left in June to return to Imbabura for a third spell.

On 26 March 2018, Espinel was appointed Clan Juvenil manager. He left the club just before the end of the season, and was named in charge of Serie A side América de Quito in May 2019; he resigned from the latter club in September.

In 2020, Espinel took over Segunda Categoría side Cumbayá and led them to the second division. He was named at the helm of Deportivo Quito also in the second level in March 2021, but left the club to take the reins Olmedo in the top tier on 5 August.
