= Ecuadorian Institute of Social Security =

Ecuadorian Social Security Institute (Instituto Ecuatoriano de Seguridad Social)
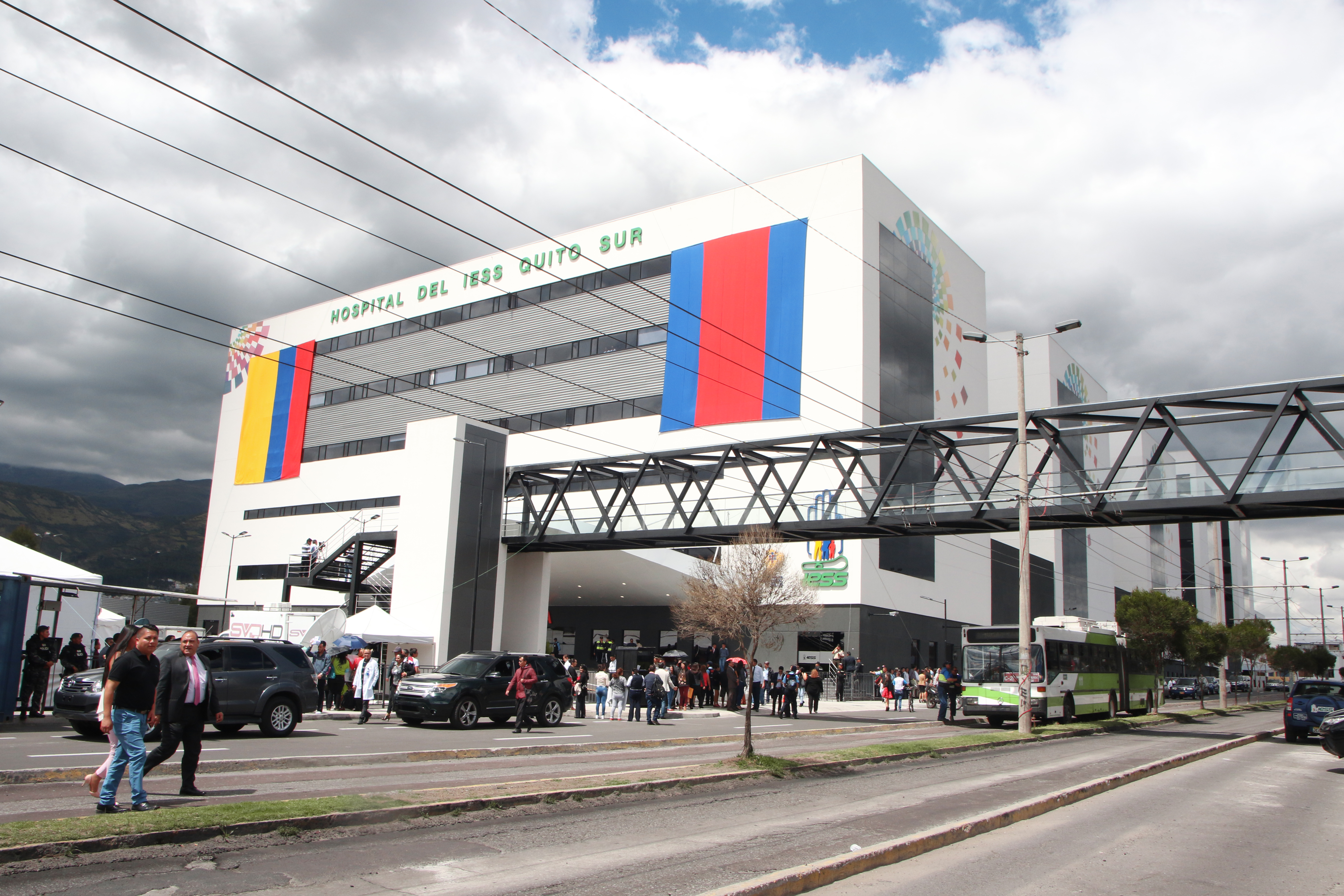
- Abbreviation: IESS
- Formation: April 13, 1928 (age 98)
- Founder: Isidro Ayora
- Type: Governmental Organization
- Headquarters: Ecuador, Quito
- Website: https://www.iess.gob.ec

The Ecuadorian Social Security Institute (Spanish: Instituto Ecuatoriano de Seguridad Social (IESS)), was founded in 13 March 1928, in the government of Isidro Antonio Ramón Ayora Cueva. Is an autonomous entity that is part of the social security system of Ecuador and is responsible for implementing the mandatory universal insurance, according to the Constitution of the Republic, in force since 2008.

The Ecuadorian Constitution states that social security is an inalienable right of all people. Social security is governed by the principles of solidarity, obligation, universality, equity, efficiency, subsidiarity, adequacy, transparency and participation.

== History ==
The Ecuadorian Social Security was stablished in 13 March 1928, as the Retirement, Civil Pension, Military Retirement and Pension, Savings, and Cooperative Fund (Caja de Jubilaciones, Montepío Civil, Retiro y Montepío Militar, Ahorro y Cooperativa).

In 1937 the Law on Mandatory Social Security Insurance Fund of Private Employees and Workers was created and the Medical Department was linked to it. On July 14, 1942, the new Law on Compulsory Social Security, in which new insurance conditions and the financing of all general insurance pensions became established, with the State's contribution of 40%, is issued, and the sickness and maternity insurance benefits among some members is joined.

On September 19, 1963, by Supreme Decree No. 517, the Pension Fund and Insurance Fund combined to create the National Housing and Medical Insurance by Supreme Decree No. 40 of July 25, 1970, published in the Official Gazette No. 15 of 10 July 1970. The National Social Security Fund became the Ecuadorian Social Security Institute (IESS).

In 1988, the National Assembly amended the Constitution of the Republic and established the permanence of the IESS as the only independent institution responsible for the implementation of the General Compulsory Insurance.

== Features and services ==
Benefits and services are delivered through four specialized Insurances: health, pensions, social security and peasant work risks.

Health Insurance Benefits:

- Medical care: outpatient and specialist, hospitalization, surgery, drugs, emergency, diagnostic laboratory tests and imaging, orthotics and prosthetics
- Preventive dental care and recovery
- Maternity Care: before and after delivery
- Monetary sickness and maternity allowances
- Programs for the elderly

Pension Insurance Benefits

- Ordinary retirement of old age
- Retirement disability including temporary disability allowance
- Pension pawnshop
- Funeral assistance
- Special Retirements: telecommunications workers, the arts and printing industry, and harvest workers
- Additional Revenue: railways, tax and graphics teaching
- Improvements retirement age

Features Work Risk Insurance

- Medical, surgical, pharmacological, hospital and rehabilitation through the Health Insurance Individual and Family
- Provide and renews prosthetic and orthotic devices
- Outplacement
- Payments of subsidies, compensation or pension income in the form of capital or, in cases of temporary, partial and total disability
- Prevention Services: studies, analyzes, evaluations and risk controls work in places where work is under way

Benefits of the Seguro Social Campesino

- Promotion, prevention, health, sanitation and community development
- Preventive dental care and recovery
- Care during pregnancy, childbirth and postpartum
- Retirement pensions for disability and old age
- Help defray funeral expenses
