= 2020 Copa Libertadores group stage =

The 2020 Copa Libertadores group stage was played from 3 March to 22 October 2020. A total of 32 teams competed in the group stage to decide the 16 places in the final stages of the 2020 Copa Libertadores.

== Draw ==
The draw for the group stage was held on 17 December 2019, 20:30 PYST (UTC−3), at the CONMEBOL Convention Centre in Luque, Paraguay.

Teams were seeded by their CONMEBOL ranking of the Copa Libertadores as of 15 December 2019 (shown in parentheses), taking into account the following three factors:

1. Performance in the last 10 years, taking into account Copa Libertadores results in the period 2010–2019
2. Historical coefficient, taking into account Copa Libertadores results in the period 1960–2009
3. Local tournament champion, with bonus points awarded to domestic league champions of the last 10 years

For the group stage, the 32 teams were drawn into eight groups (Groups A–H) of four containing a team from each of the four pots. Teams from the same association could not be drawn into the same group, excluding the four winners of the third stage, which were allocated to Pot 4 and whose identity was not known at the time of the draw, and could be drawn into the same group with another team from the same association.

Group stage draw
| Pot 1 | Pot 2 | Pot 3 | Pot 4 |
|---|---|---|---|
| (Brazil) Flamengo (8); (Argentina) River Plate (1); (Argentina) Boca Juniors (2); (Brazil) Grêmio (3); (Uruguay) Nacional (4); (Uruguay) Peñarol (5); (Brazil) Palmeiras (6); (Paraguay) Olimpia (10) | (Ecuador) Independiente del Valle (35); (Brazil) Santos (14); (Brazil) São Paulo (17); (Paraguay) Libertad (19); (Chile) Colo-Colo (21); (Bolivia) Bolívar (24); (Argentina) Racing (27); (Chile) Universidad Católica (29) | (Ecuador) LDU Quito (30); (Colombia) América de Cali (36); (Brazil) Athletico Paranaense (41); (Colombia) Junior (48); (Peru) Alianza Lima (54); (Venezuela) Caracas (72); (Ecuador) Delfín (82); (Argentina) Tigre (93) | (Venezuela) Estudiantes de Mérida (113); (Peru) Binacional (140); (Argentina) Defensa y Justicia (208); (Bolivia) Jorge Wilstermann (38); Third stage winner G1; Third stage winner G2; Third stage winner G3; Third stage winner G4 |

Notes

1. ^{TH} The defending Copa Libertadores champions were automatically seeded in Pot 1 and allocated to Group A.
2. ^{CS} The defending Copa Sudamericana champions were automatically seeded in Pot 2.
3. ^{BOL} The identity of the team Bolivia 2 was not known at the time of the draw, and was seeded in Pot 4.

The following were the four winners of the third stage of qualifying which joined the 28 direct entrants in the group stage.

| Match | Third stage winners |
|---|---|
| G1 | (Ecuador) Barcelona (23) |
| G2 | (Paraguay) Guaraní (34) |
| G3 | (Colombia) Independiente Medellín (68) |
| G4 | (Brazil) Internacional (16) |

== Format ==
In the group stage, each group was played on a home-and-away round-robin basis. The teams were ranked according to the following criteria: 1. Points (3 points for a win, 1 point for a draw, and 0 points for a loss); 2. Goal difference; 3. Goals scored; 4. Away goals scored; 5. CONMEBOL ranking (Regulations Article 2.4.2).

The winners and runners-up of each group advanced to the round of 16 of the final stages. The third-placed teams of each group entered the Copa Sudamericana second stage.

== Schedule ==
The schedule of each matchday was as follows (Regulations Article 2.2.2).

On 12 March 2020, CONMEBOL announced that the tournament would be temporarily suspended after matchday 2 due to the COVID-19 pandemic, with matches on matchday 3, originally scheduled for 17–19 March 2020, postponed to a later date to be confirmed. On 18 March 2020, CONMEBOL announced that the tournament would be suspended until 5 May 2020. On 17 April 2020, CONMEBOL announced that the tournament would be suspended indefinitely, and no date had been set for its resumption. On 10 July 2020, CONMEBOL announced the new schedule for the remainder of the competition, with the fixtures being confirmed on 20 July 2020, and the updated fixtures announced on 26 August 2020.

| Matchday | Dates | Matches |
|---|---|---|
| Matchday 1 | 3–5 March 2020 | Team 4 vs. Team 2, Team 3 vs. Team 1 |
| Matchday 2 | 10–12 March 2020 | Team 2 vs. Team 3, Team 1 vs. Team 4 |
| Matchday 3 | 15–17 September 2020 (originally 17–19 March 2020) | Team 2 vs. Team 1, Team 4 vs. Team 3 |
| Matchday 4 | 22–24 September 2020 (originally 7–9 April 2020) | Team 3 vs. Team 2, Team 4 vs. Team 1 |
| Matchday 5 | 29 September – 1 October 2020 (originally 21–23 April 2020) | Team 1 vs. Team 2, Team 3 vs. Team 4 |
| Matchday 6 | 20–22 October 2020 (originally 5–7 May 2020) | Team 1 vs. Team 3, Team 2 vs. Team 4 |

== Groups ==
=== Group A ===
| Pos | Team | Pld | W | D | L | GF | GA | GD | Pts | Qualification | FLA | IDV | JUN | BSC |
|---|---|---|---|---|---|---|---|---|---|---|---|---|---|---|
| 1 | (Brazil) Flamengo | 6 | 5 | 0 | 1 | 14 | 8 | +6 | 15 | Round of 16 | — | 4–0 | 3–1 | 3–0 |
| 2 | (Ecuador) Independiente del Valle | 6 | 4 | 0 | 2 | 14 | 8 | +6 | 12 | Round of 16 | 5–0 | — | 3–0 | 2–0 |
| 3 | (Colombia) Junior | 6 | 2 | 0 | 4 | 8 | 12 | −4 | 6 | Copa Sudamericana | 1–2 | 4–1 | — | 0–2 |
| 4 | (Ecuador) Barcelona | 6 | 1 | 0 | 5 | 4 | 12 | −8 | 3 | | 1–2 | 0–3 | 1–2 | — |

Source: CONMEBOL
4 March 2020
17:15 UTC−5

| Barcelona (Ecuador) | 0–3 | (Ecuador) Independiente del Valle |
|---|---|---|
| | Report | Torres 55'; Ortiz 87'; Pellerano 90+5' (pen.) |

Estadio Monumental Isidro Romero Carbo, Guayaquil
Referee: Roberto Tobar (Chile)
4 March 2020
19:30 UTC−5

| Junior (Colombia) | 1–2 | (Brazil) Flamengo |
|---|---|---|
| Gutiérrez 90+5' | Report | Éverton Ribeiro 6', 79' |

Estadio Metropolitano Roberto Meléndez, Barranquilla
Referee: Alexis Herrera (Venezuela)

11 March 2020
19:30 UTC−5

| Independiente del Valle (Ecuador) | 3–0 | (Colombia) Junior |
|---|---|---|
| Guerrero 60'; M. Caicedo 84'; Faravelli 90+4' | Report |

Estadio Olímpico Atahualpa, Quito (Note: Independiente del Valle played their home matches against Junior and Barcelona at Estadio Olímpico Atahualpa, Quito, and played their home match against Flamengo at Estadio Rodrigo Paz Delgado, Quito, instead of their regular stadium Estadio Rumiñahui, Sangolquí which does not meet CONMEBOL requirements.)
Referee: Diego Haro (Peru)
11 March 2020
21:30 UTC−3

| Flamengo (Brazil) | 3–0 | (Ecuador) Barcelona |
|---|---|---|
| Gustavo Henrique 39'; Gabriel Barbosa 45' (pen.); Bruno Henrique 53' | Report |

Estádio do Maracanã, Rio de Janeiro
Referee: Facundo Tello (Argentina)

17 September 2020
19:00 UTC−5

| Independiente del Valle (Ecuador) | 5–0 | (Brazil) Flamengo |
|---|---|---|
| M. Caicedo 40'; Preciado 49'; Torres 58'; Sánchez 81'; B. Caicedo 90+2' | Report |

Estadio Rodrigo Paz Delgado, Quito
Attendance: 0
Referee: Wilmar Roldán (Colombia)
17 September 2020
21:00 UTC−5

| Barcelona (Ecuador) | 1–2 | (Colombia) Junior |
|---|---|---|
| Colmán 28' | Report | Viera 7'; Borja 70' |

Estadio Monumental Isidro Romero Carbo, Guayaquil
Attendance: 0
Referee: Kevin Ortega (Peru)

22 September 2020
17:15 UTC−5

| Barcelona (Ecuador) | 1–2 | (Brazil) Flamengo |
|---|---|---|
| L. Martínez 48' | Report | Pedro 6'; De Arrascaeta 26' |

Estadio Monumental Isidro Romero Carbo, Guayaquil
Attendance: 0
Referee: Diego Haro (Peru)
22 September 2020
19:30 UTC−5

| Junior (Colombia) | 4–1 | (Ecuador) Independiente del Valle |
|---|---|---|
| Valencia 44', 55', 78'; Hinestroza 85' | Report | Torres 20' |

Estadio Metropolitano Roberto Meléndez, Barranquilla
Attendance: 0
Referee: José Argote (Venezuela)

30 September 2020
21:30 UTC−3

| Flamengo (Brazil) | 4–0 | (Ecuador) Independiente del Valle |
|---|---|---|
| Lincoln 26'; Pedro 30'; Bruno Henrique 51', 72' | Report |

Estádio do Maracanã, Rio de Janeiro
Attendance: 0
Referee: Fernando Rapallini (Argentina)
30 September 2020
19:30 UTC−5

| Junior (Colombia) | 0–2 | (Ecuador) Barcelona |
|---|---|---|
| | Report | Castillo 45'; Álvez 46' |

Estadio Metropolitano Roberto Meléndez, Barranquilla
Attendance: 0
Referee: Alexis Herrera (Venezuela)

21 October 2020
21:30 UTC−3

| Flamengo (Brazil) | 3–1 | (Colombia) Junior |
|---|---|---|
| Thuler 10'; Lincoln 40'; Bruno Henrique 75' | Report | Gutiérrez 69' |

Estádio do Maracanã, Rio de Janeiro
Attendance: 0
Referee: Patricio Loustau (Argentina)
21 October 2020
19:30 UTC−5

| Independiente del Valle (Ecuador) | 2–0 | (Ecuador) Barcelona |
|---|---|---|
| Ortiz 24'; Torres 60' | Report |

Estadio Olímpico Atahualpa, Quito
Attendance: 0
Referee: Luis Quiroz (Ecuador)

=== Group B ===
| Pos | Team | Pld | W | D | L | GF | GA | GD | Pts | Qualification | PAL | GUA | BOL | TIG |
|---|---|---|---|---|---|---|---|---|---|---|---|---|---|---|
| 1 | (Brazil) Palmeiras | 6 | 5 | 1 | 0 | 17 | 2 | +15 | 16 | Round of 16 | — | 3–1 | 5–0 | 5–0 |
| 2 | (Paraguay) Guaraní | 6 | 4 | 1 | 1 | 13 | 7 | +6 | 13 | Round of 16 | 0–0 | — | 2–0 | 4–1 |
| 3 | (Bolivia) Bolívar | 6 | 1 | 1 | 4 | 6 | 13 | −7 | 4 | Copa Sudamericana | 1–2 | 2–3 | — | 2–0 |
| 4 | (Argentina) Tigre | 6 | 0 | 1 | 5 | 3 | 17 | −14 | 1 | | 0–2 | 1–3 | 1–1 | — |

Source: CONMEBOL
4 March 2020
19:15 UTC−3

| Tigre (Argentina) | 0–2 | (Brazil) Palmeiras |
|---|---|---|
| | Report | Luiz Adriano 16'; Willian 65' |

Estadio José Dellagiovanna, Victoria
Referee: Wilmar Roldán (Colombia)
4 March 2020
21:30 UTC−3

| Guaraní (Paraguay) | 2–0 | (Bolivia) Bolívar |
|---|---|---|
| Báez 4' (pen.); Bobadilla 50' | Report |

Estadio General Pablo Rojas, Asunción (Note: Guaraní played their home match against Bolívar at Estadio General Pablo Rojas, Asunción, and played their home matches against Tigre and Palmeiras at Estadio Defensores del Chaco, Asunción, instead of their regular stadium Estadio Rogelio Livieres, Asunción, which does not meet CONMEBOL requirements.)
Referee: Augusto Aragón (Ecuador)

10 March 2020
18:15 UTC−4

| Bolívar (Bolivia) | 2–0 | (Argentina) Tigre |
|---|---|---|
| Flores 48'; Saavedra 69' | Report |

Estadio Hernando Siles, La Paz
Referee: Ángel Arteaga (Venezuela)
10 March 2020
21:30 UTC−3

| Palmeiras (Brazil) | 3–1 | (Paraguay) Guaraní |
|---|---|---|
| Luiz Adriano 53', 73', 82' | Report | Bobadilla 88' |

Allianz Parque, São Paulo
Referee: Roberto Tobar (Chile)

16 September 2020
20:30 UTC−4

| Bolívar (Bolivia) | 1–2 | (Brazil) Palmeiras |
|---|---|---|
| Riquelme 67' | Report | Willian 34' (pen.); Menino 60' |

Estadio Hernando Siles, La Paz
Attendance: 0
Referee: Piero Maza (Chile)
17 September 2020
22:00 UTC−4

| Guaraní (Paraguay) | 4–1 | (Argentina) Tigre |
|---|---|---|
| Merlini 26'; Domínguez 67' (pen.); É. Benítez 83'; Á. Benítez 90' | Report | Magnín 9' |

Estadio Defensores del Chaco, Asunción
Attendance: 0
Referee: Gustavo Tejera (Uruguay)

22 September 2020
19:15 UTC−3

| Tigre (Argentina) | 1–1 | (Bolivia) Bolívar |
|---|---|---|
| Magnín 17' | Report | Riquelme 36' |

Estadio José Dellagiovanna, Victoria
Attendance: 0
Referee: Roberto Tobar (Chile)
23 September 2020
20:30 UTC−4

| Guaraní (Paraguay) | 0–0 | (Brazil) Palmeiras |
|---|---|---|
| | Report |

Estadio Defensores del Chaco, Asunción
Attendance: 0
Referee: Néstor Pitana (Argentina)

30 September 2020
19:15 UTC−3

| Palmeiras (Brazil) | 5–0 | (Bolivia) Bolívar |
|---|---|---|
| Willian 4'; Wesley 47'; Viña 59'; Veiga 61'; Rony 64' | Report |

Allianz Parque, São Paulo
Attendance: 0
Referee: Leodán González (Uruguay)
1 October 2020
21:00 UTC−3

| Tigre (Argentina) | 1–3 | (Paraguay) Guaraní |
|---|---|---|
| Magnín 36' | Report | Romaña 19'; Florentín 54'; Domínguez 86' |

Estadio José Dellagiovanna, Victoria
Attendance: 0
Referee: Roberto Tobar (Chile)

21 October 2020
21:30 UTC−3

| Palmeiras (Brazil) | 5–0 | (Argentina) Tigre |
|---|---|---|
| Veiga 34'; Gómez 54'; Zé Rafael 66'; Veron 75'; Rony 81' | Report |

Allianz Parque, São Paulo
Attendance: 0
Referee: Esteban Ostojich (Uruguay)
21 October 2020
20:30 UTC−4

| Bolívar (Bolivia) | 2–3 | (Paraguay) Guaraní |
|---|---|---|
| Riquelme 80'; Domínguez 89' | Report | F. Fernández 13'; Maná 90+2'; Florentín 90+6' |

Estadio Hernando Siles, La Paz
Attendance: 0
Referee: Ángelo Hermosilla (Chile)

=== Group C ===
| Pos | Team | Pld | W | D | L | GF | GA | GD | Pts | Qualification | WIL | CAP | PEÑ | CCL |
|---|---|---|---|---|---|---|---|---|---|---|---|---|---|---|
| 1 | (Bolivia) Jorge Wilstermann | 6 | 3 | 1 | 2 | 8 | 5 | +3 | 10 | Round of 16 | — | 2–3 | 3–1 | 2–0 |
| 2 | (Brazil) Athletico Paranaense | 6 | 3 | 1 | 2 | 8 | 6 | +2 | 10 | Round of 16 | 0–0 | — | 1–0 | 2–0 |
| 3 | (Uruguay) Peñarol | 6 | 3 | 0 | 3 | 9 | 8 | +1 | 9 | Copa Sudamericana | 1–0 | 3–2 | — | 3–0 |
| 4 | (Chile) Colo-Colo | 6 | 2 | 0 | 4 | 3 | 9 | −6 | 6 | | 0–1 | 1–0 | 2–1 | — |

Source: CONMEBOL
3 March 2020
21:30 UTC−3

| Athletico Paranaense (Brazil) | 1–0 | (Uruguay) Peñarol |
|---|---|---|
| Bissoli 77' | Report |

Arena da Baixada, Curitiba
Referee: Éber Aquino (Paraguay)
4 March 2020
18:15 UTC−4

| Jorge Wilstermann (Bolivia) | 2–0 | (Chile) Colo-Colo |
|---|---|---|
| Pedriel 58'; Cortés 90+4' (o.g.) | Report |

Estadio Félix Capriles, Cochabamba
Referee: Andrés Merlos (Argentina)

11 March 2020
19:15 UTC−3

| Colo-Colo (Chile) | 1–0 | (Brazil) Athletico Paranaense |
|---|---|---|
| Mouche 11' | Report |

Estadio Monumental David Arellano, Santiago
Referee: Nicolás Gallo (Colombia)
11 March 2020
19:15 UTC−3

| Peñarol (Uruguay) | 1–0 | (Bolivia) Jorge Wilstermann |
|---|---|---|
| Meleán 68' (o.g.) | Report |

Estadio Campeón del Siglo, Montevideo
Referee: José Argote (Venezuela)

15 September 2020
19:15 UTC−3

| Colo-Colo (Chile) | 2–1 | (Uruguay) Peñarol |
|---|---|---|
| Suazo 51'; Paredes 62' (pen.) | Report | Pellistri 40' |

Estadio Monumental David Arellano, Santiago
Attendance: 0
Referee: Mauro Vigliano (Argentina)
15 September 2020
18:15 UTC−4

| Jorge Wilstermann (Bolivia) | 2–3 | (Brazil) Athletico Paranaense |
|---|---|---|
| G. Álvarez 11'; Serginho 56' | Report | González 40' (pen.); Christian 74'; Walter 90+1' |

Estadio Félix Capriles, Cochabamba
Attendance: 0
Referee: Ángelo Hermosilla (Chile)

23 September 2020
19:15 UTC−3

| Athletico Paranaense (Brazil) | 2–0 | (Chile) Colo-Colo |
|---|---|---|
| Campos 7' (o.g.); Suazo 14' (o.g.) | Report |

Arena da Baixada, Curitiba
Attendance: 0
Referee: Fernando Rapallini (Argentina)
24 September 2020
18:00 UTC−4

| Jorge Wilstermann (Bolivia) | 3–1 | (Uruguay) Peñarol |
|---|---|---|
| Melgar 11' (pen.); Rodríguez 45', 53' | Report | Formiliano 3' |

Estadio Félix Capriles, Cochabamba
Attendance: 0
Referee: Piero Maza (Chile)

29 September 2020
19:15 UTC−3

| Peñarol (Uruguay) | 3–0 | (Chile) Colo-Colo |
|---|---|---|
| Kagelmacher 23'; Torres 57'; Urretaviscaya 83' | Report |

Estadio Campeón del Siglo, Montevideo
Attendance: 0
Referee: Juan Benítez (Paraguay)
29 September 2020
21:30 UTC−3

| Athletico Paranaense (Brazil) | 0–0 | (Bolivia) Jorge Wilstermann |
|---|---|---|
| | Report |

Arena da Baixada, Curitiba
Attendance: 0
Referee: Patricio Loustau (Argentina)

20 October 2020
21:30 UTC−3

| Peñarol (Uruguay) | 3–2 | (Brazil) Athletico Paranaense |
|---|---|---|
| Formiliano 2'; Kagelmacher 63'; Britos 81' | Report | González 36'; Richard 45' |

Estadio Campeón del Siglo, Montevideo
Attendance: 0
Referee: José Méndez (Paraguay)
20 October 2020
21:30 UTC−3

| Colo-Colo (Chile) | 0–1 | (Bolivia) Jorge Wilstermann |
|---|---|---|
| | Report | Villarroel 88' |

Estadio Monumental David Arellano, Santiago
Attendance: 0
Referee: Dario Herrera (Argentina)

=== Group D ===
| Pos | Team | Pld | W | D | L | GF | GA | GD | Pts | Qualification | RIV | LDQ | SPA | BIN |
|---|---|---|---|---|---|---|---|---|---|---|---|---|---|---|
| 1 | (Argentina) River Plate | 6 | 4 | 1 | 1 | 21 | 6 | +15 | 13 | Round of 16 | — | 3–0 | 2–1 | 8–0 |
| 2 | (Ecuador) LDU Quito | 6 | 4 | 0 | 2 | 12 | 8 | +4 | 12 | Round of 16 | 3–0 | — | 4–2 | 4–0 |
| 3 | (Brazil) São Paulo | 6 | 2 | 1 | 3 | 14 | 11 | +3 | 7 | Copa Sudamericana | 2–2 | 3–0 | — | 5–1 |
| 4 | (Peru) Binacional | 6 | 1 | 0 | 5 | 3 | 25 | −22 | 3 | | 0–6 | 0–1 | 2–1 | — |

Source: CONMEBOL
4 March 2020
19:30 UTC−5

| LDU Quito (Ecuador) | 3–0 | (Argentina) River Plate |
|---|---|---|
| Guerra 15'; Martínez Borja 36'; Sornoza 76' (pen.) | Report |

Estadio Rodrigo Paz Delgado, Quito
Referee: Andrés Rojas (Colombia)
5 March 2020
19:00 UTC−5

| Binacional (Peru) | 2–1 | (Brazil) São Paulo |
|---|---|---|
| Rodríguez 50'; Arango 77' | Report | Pato 20' |

Estadio Guillermo Briceño Rosamedina, Juliaca
Referee: José Méndez (Paraguay)

11 March 2020
19:15 UTC−3

| River Plate (Argentina) | 8–0 | (Peru) Binacional |
|---|---|---|
| Casco 38'; Borré 55'; Carrascal 58'; Fernández 74', 90+2'; Rojas 79'; Díaz 80'; Suárez 88' | Report |

Estadio Monumental Antonio Vespucio Liberti, Buenos Aires
Referee: Jesús Valenzuela (Venezuela)
11 March 2020
21:30 UTC−3

| São Paulo (Brazil) | 3–0 | (Ecuador) LDU Quito |
|---|---|---|
| Reinaldo 14' (pen.); Dani Alves 15'; Igor Gomes 61' | Report |

Estádio do Morumbi, São Paulo
Referee: Esteban Ostojich (Uruguay)

15 September 2020
19:30 UTC−5

| Binacional (Peru) | 0–1 | (Ecuador) LDU Quito |
|---|---|---|
| | Report | Zunino 30' |

Estadio Nacional, Lima (Note: Binacional played their home matches against LDU Quito and River Plate at Estadio Nacional, Lima instead of their regular stadium Estadio Guillermo Briceño Rosamedina, Juliaca.)
Attendance: 0
Referee: Ivo Méndez (Bolivia)
17 September 2020
19:00 UTC−3

| São Paulo (Brazil) | 2–2 | (Argentina) River Plate |
|---|---|---|
| Pérez 10' (o.g.); Angileri 83' (o.g.) | Report | Borré 18'; Álvarez 80' |

Estádio do Morumbi, São Paulo
Attendance: 0
Referee: Esteban Ostojich (Uruguay)

22 September 2020
19:30 UTC−5

| LDU Quito (Ecuador) | 4–2 | (Brazil) São Paulo |
|---|---|---|
| Martínez Borja 21'; Julio 36', 45+1'; Arce 76' | Report | Brenner 60'; Tréllez 82' |

Estadio Rodrigo Paz Delgado, Quito
Attendance: 0
Referee: Wilmar Roldán (Colombia)
22 September 2020
19:30 UTC−5

| Binacional (Peru) | 0–6 | (Argentina) River Plate |
|---|---|---|
| | Report | De La Cruz 15'; Suárez 25'; Álvarez 36'; Fernández 70'; Pratto 84', 90+2' |

Estadio Nacional, Lima
Attendance: 0
Referee: Gery Vargas (Bolivia)

29 September 2020
19:30 UTC−5

| LDU Quito (Ecuador) | 4–0 | (Peru) Binacional |
|---|---|---|
| Otoya 2' (o.g.); Mancilla 14' (o.g.); Muñoz 58', 81' | Report |

Estadio Rodrigo Paz Delgado, Quito
Attendance: 0
Referee: Alexander Ospina (Colombia)
30 September 2020
21:30 UTC−3

| River Plate (Argentina) | 2–1 | (Brazil) São Paulo |
|---|---|---|
| Álvarez 11', 37' | Report | Diego Costa 26' |

Estadio Libertadores de América, Avellaneda (Note: River Plate played their home matches against São Paulo and LDU Quito at Estadio Libertadores de América, Avellaneda due to renovations in their regular stadium Estadio Monumental Antonio Vespucio Liberti, Buenos Aires.)
Attendance: 0
Referee: Cristian Garay (Chile)

20 October 2020
21:30 UTC−3

| River Plate (Argentina) | 3–0 | (Ecuador) LDU Quito |
|---|---|---|
| Borré 53'; Álvarez 60'; Carrascal 89' | Report |

Estadio Libertadores de América, Avellaneda
Attendance: 0
Referee: Roberto Tobar (Chile)
20 October 2020
21:30 UTC−3

| São Paulo (Brazil) | 5–1 | (Peru) Binacional |
|---|---|---|
| Bueno 7'; Brenner 35'; Pablo 51', 85'; Arboleda 54' | Report | Deza 40' |

Estádio do Morumbi, São Paulo
Attendance: 0
Referee: Facundo Tello (Argentina)

=== Group E ===
| Pos | Team | Pld | W | D | L | GF | GA | GD | Pts | Qualification | GRE | INT | UCA | AME |
|---|---|---|---|---|---|---|---|---|---|---|---|---|---|---|
| 1 | (Brazil) Grêmio | 6 | 3 | 2 | 1 | 6 | 3 | +3 | 11 | Round of 16 | — | 0–0 | 2–0 | 1–1 |
| 2 | (Brazil) Internacional | 6 | 2 | 2 | 2 | 8 | 6 | +2 | 8 | Round of 16 | 0–1 | — | 3–0 | 4–3 |
| 3 | (Chile) Universidad Católica | 6 | 2 | 1 | 3 | 5 | 8 | −3 | 7 | Copa Sudamericana | 2–0 | 2–1 | — | 1–2 |
| 4 | (Colombia) América de Cali | 6 | 1 | 3 | 2 | 6 | 8 | −2 | 6 | | 0–2 | 0–0 | 1–1 | — |

Source: CONMEBOL
3 March 2020
19:15 UTC−3

| Internacional (Brazil) | 3–0 | (Chile) Universidad Católica |
|---|---|---|
| Guerrero 62', 67'; Marcos Guilherme 71' | Report |

Estádio Beira-Rio, Porto Alegre
Referee: Ángel Arteaga (Venezuela)
3 March 2020
19:30 UTC−5

| América de Cali (Colombia) | 0–2 | (Brazil) Grêmio |
|---|---|---|
| | Report | Ferraz 15'; Matheus Henrique 50' |

Estadio Pascual Guerrero, Cali
Referee: Guillermo Guerrero (Ecuador)

10 March 2020
19:15 UTC−3

| Universidad Católica (Chile) | 1–2 | (Colombia) América de Cali |
|---|---|---|
| Núñez 45+1' | Report | Vergara 22'; Pisano 53' |

Estadio San Carlos de Apoquindo, Santiago
Referee: Gustavo Tejera (Uruguay)
12 March 2020
21:00 UTC−3

| Grêmio (Brazil) | 0–0 | (Brazil) Internacional |
|---|---|---|
| | Report |

Arena do Grêmio, Porto Alegre
Referee: Fernando Rapallini (Argentina)

16 September 2020
19:15 UTC−3

| Internacional (Brazil) | 4–3 | (Colombia) América de Cali |
|---|---|---|
| Hernández 1', 32'; Boschilia 19', 90' | Report | Vergara 28'; Ramos 49'; Moreno 78' |

Estádio Beira-Rio, Porto Alegre
Attendance: 0
Referee: Facundo Tello (Argentina)
16 September 2020
21:30 UTC−3

| Universidad Católica (Chile) | 2–0 | (Brazil) Grêmio |
|---|---|---|
| Zampedri 44'; Pinares 45+1' | Report |

Estadio San Carlos de Apoquindo, Santiago
Attendance: 0
Referee: Darío Herrera (Argentina)

23 September 2020
19:30 UTC−5

| América de Cali (Colombia) | 1–1 | (Chile) Universidad Católica |
|---|---|---|
| Vergara 4' | Report | Zampedri 34' |

Estadio Pascual Guerrero, Cali
Attendance: 0
Referee: Jesús Valenzuela (Venezuela)
23 September 2020
21:30 UTC−3

| Internacional (Brazil) | 0–1 | (Brazil) Grêmio |
|---|---|---|
| | Report | Pepê 74' |

Estádio Beira-Rio, Porto Alegre
Attendance: 0
Referee: Patricio Loustau (Argentina)

29 September 2020
19:15 UTC−3

| Grêmio (Brazil) | 2–0 | (Chile) Universidad Católica |
|---|---|---|
| Pepê 47'; Rodrigues 63' | Report |

Arena do Grêmio, Porto Alegre
Attendance: 0
Referee: Facundo Tello (Argentina)
29 September 2020
19:30 UTC−5

| América de Cali (Colombia) | 0–0 | (Brazil) Internacional |
|---|---|---|
| | Report |

Estadio Pascual Guerrero, Cali
Attendance: 0
Referee: Guillermo Guerrero (Ecuador)

22 October 2020
21:30 UTC−3

| Grêmio (Brazil) | 1–1 | (Colombia) América de Cali |
|---|---|---|
| Diego Souza 90+11' (pen.) | Report | Kannemann 53' (o.g.) |

Arena do Grêmio, Porto Alegre
Attendance: 0
Referee: Fernando Rapallini (Argentina)
22 October 2020
21:30 UTC−3

| Universidad Católica (Chile) | 2–1 | (Brazil) Internacional |
|---|---|---|
| Zampedri 25', 89' | Report | D'Alessandro 24' (pen.) |

Estadio San Carlos de Apoquindo, Santiago
Attendance: 0
Referee: Mauro Vigliano (Argentina)

=== Group F ===
| Pos | Team | Pld | W | D | L | GF | GA | GD | Pts | Qualification | NAC | RAC | ESM | ALI |
|---|---|---|---|---|---|---|---|---|---|---|---|---|---|---|
| 1 | (Uruguay) Nacional | 6 | 5 | 0 | 1 | 9 | 3 | +6 | 15 | Round of 16 | — | 1–2 | 1–0 | 2–0 |
| 2 | (Argentina) Racing | 6 | 5 | 0 | 1 | 9 | 4 | +5 | 15 | Round of 16 | 0–1 | — | 2–1 | 1–0 |
| 3 | (Venezuela) Estudiantes de Mérida | 6 | 1 | 1 | 4 | 8 | 12 | −4 | 4 | Copa Sudamericana | 1–3 | 1–2 | — | 3–2 |
| 4 | (Peru) Alianza Lima | 6 | 0 | 1 | 5 | 4 | 11 | −7 | 1 | | 0–1 | 0–2 | 2–2 | — |

Source: CONMEBOL
5 March 2020
18:00 UTC−4

| Estudiantes de Mérida (Venezuela) | 1–2 | (Argentina) Racing |
|---|---|---|
| J. Rivas 48' | Report | Reniero 71'; Zaracho 84' |

Estadio Metropolitano de Mérida, Mérida
Referee: Raphael Claus (Brazil)
5 March 2020
21:00 UTC−5

| Alianza Lima (Peru) | 0–1 | (Uruguay) Nacional |
|---|---|---|
| | Report | Rodríguez 1' |

Estadio Alejandro Villanueva, Lima
Referee: Bruno Arleu (Brazil)

12 March 2020
19:00 UTC−3

| Nacional (Uruguay) | 1–0 | (Venezuela) Estudiantes de Mérida |
|---|---|---|
| Carballo 69' | Report |

Estadio Gran Parque Central, Montevideo
Referee: Wilton Sampaio (Brazil)
12 March 2020
21:00 UTC−3

| Racing (Argentina) | 1–0 | (Peru) Alianza Lima |
|---|---|---|
| Reniero 56' | Report |

Estadio Presidente Juan Domingo Perón, Avellaneda
Attendance: 0 (Note: The match between Racing and Alianza Lima was played behind closed doors due to government requirements as a result of the COVID-19 pandemic in Argentina.)
Referee: José Méndez (Paraguay)

16 September 2020
18:15 UTC−4

| Estudiantes de Mérida (Venezuela) | 3–2 | (Peru) Alianza Lima |
|---|---|---|
| E. Rivas 64'; Mena 81'; J. Rivas 90+7' (pen.) | Report | Gómez 51' (pen.); Arroe 54' |

Estadio Metropolitano de Mérida, Mérida
Attendance: 0
Referee: Nicolás Gallo (Colombia)
17 September 2020
17:00 UTC−3

| Racing (Argentina) | 0–1 | (Uruguay) Nacional |
|---|---|---|
| | Report | Bergessio 53' (pen.) |

Estadio Presidente Juan Domingo Perón, Avellaneda
Attendance: 0
Referee: Cristian Garay (Chile)

22 September 2020
18:15 UTC−4

| Estudiantes de Mérida (Venezuela) | 1–3 | (Uruguay) Nacional |
|---|---|---|
| R. Rivas 45+1' | Report | Vecino 6', 60' (pen.); Orihuela 27' |

Estadio Metropolitano de Mérida, Mérida
Attendance: 0
Referee: Andrés Rojas (Colombia)
23 September 2020
19:30 UTC−5

| Alianza Lima (Peru) | 0–2 | (Argentina) Racing |
|---|---|---|
| | Report | Banega 87'; Garré 90' |

Estadio Alejandro Villanueva, Lima
Attendance: 0
Referee: Ivo Méndez (Bolivia)

30 September 2020
19:15 UTC−3

| Nacional (Uruguay) | 1–2 | (Argentina) Racing |
|---|---|---|
| Soto 53' (o.g.) | Report | Reniero 17'; Fértoli 76' (pen.) |

Estadio Gran Parque Central, Montevideo
Attendance: 0
Referee: José Méndez (Paraguay)
30 September 2020
19:30 UTC−5

| Alianza Lima (Peru) | 2–2 | (Venezuela) Estudiantes de Mérida |
|---|---|---|
| Arroe 3'; Rubio 90+5' | Report | J. Rivas 35' (pen.), 67' (pen.) |

Estadio Alejandro Villanueva, Lima
Attendance: 0
Referee: Gery Vargas (Bolivia)

21 October 2020
19:15 UTC−3

| Nacional (Uruguay) | 2–0 | (Peru) Alianza Lima |
|---|---|---|
| Bergessio 8'; Trezza 31' | Report |

Estadio Gran Parque Central, Montevideo
Attendance: 0
Referee: Juan Benítez (Paraguay)
21 October 2020
19:15 UTC−3

| Racing (Argentina) | 2–1 | (Venezuela) Estudiantes de Mérida |
|---|---|---|
| Melgarejo 60'; Rojas 86' | Report | Plazas 66' |

Estadio Presidente Juan Domingo Perón, Avellaneda
Attendance: 0
Referee: Andrés Cunha (Uruguay)

=== Group G ===
| Pos | Team | Pld | W | D | L | GF | GA | GD | Pts | Qualification | SAN | DEL | DYJ | OLI |
|---|---|---|---|---|---|---|---|---|---|---|---|---|---|---|
| 1 | (Brazil) Santos | 6 | 5 | 1 | 0 | 10 | 5 | +5 | 16 | Round of 16 | — | 1–0 | 2–1 | 0–0 |
| 2 | (Ecuador) Delfín | 6 | 2 | 1 | 3 | 6 | 7 | −1 | 7 | Round of 16 | 1–2 | — | 3–0 | 1–1 |
| 3 | (Argentina) Defensa y Justicia | 6 | 2 | 0 | 4 | 8 | 10 | −2 | 6 | Copa Sudamericana | 1–2 | 3–0 | — | 2–1 |
| 4 | (Paraguay) Olimpia | 6 | 1 | 2 | 3 | 6 | 8 | −2 | 5 | | 2–3 | 0–1 | 2–1 | — |

Source: CONMEBOL
3 March 2020
19:15 UTC−3

| Defensa y Justicia (Argentina) | 1–2 | (Brazil) Santos |
|---|---|---|
| Rodríguez 45+1' | Report | Jobson 72'; Kaio Jorge 86' |

Estadio Norberto Tomaghello, Gobernador Costa
Referee: Gustavo Tejera (Uruguay)
4 March 2020
19:30 UTC−5

| Delfín (Ecuador) | 1–1 | (Paraguay) Olimpia |
|---|---|---|
| Alaniz 69' | Report | Cangá 5' (o.g.) |

Estadio Jocay, Manta
Referee: Leodán González (Uruguay)

10 March 2020
19:15 UTC−3

| Santos (Brazil) | 1–0 | (Ecuador) Delfín |
|---|---|---|
| Veríssimo 30' | Report |

Estádio Urbano Caldeira, Santos
Referee: Kevin Ortega (Peru)
11 March 2020
21:30 UTC−3

| Olimpia (Paraguay) | 2–1 | (Argentina) Defensa y Justicia |
|---|---|---|
| Rolón 60'; Montenegro 80' | Report | Benítez 90+1' |

Estadio Manuel Ferreira, Asunción
Attendance: 0 (Note: The match between Olimpia and Defensa y Justicia was played behind closed doors due to government requirements as a result of the COVID-19 pandemic in Paraguay.)
Referee: Víctor Carrillo (Peru)

15 September 2020
21:30 UTC−3

| Santos (Brazil) | 0–0 | (Paraguay) Olimpia |
|---|---|---|
| | Report |

Estádio Urbano Caldeira, Santos
Attendance: 0
Referee: Leodán González (Uruguay)
17 September 2020
19:00 UTC−3

| Defensa y Justicia (Argentina) | 3–0 | (Ecuador) Delfín |
|---|---|---|
| Romero 52'; Hachen 55'; Leguizamón 79' | Report |

Estadio Norberto Tomaghello, Gobernador Costa
Attendance: 0
Referee: Roberto Tobar (Chile)

23 September 2020
19:15 UTC−3

| Defensa y Justicia (Argentina) | 2–1 | (Paraguay) Olimpia |
|---|---|---|
| Camacho 20'; Romero 62' | Report | Pitta 75' |

Estadio Norberto Tomaghello, Gobernador Costa
Attendance: 0
Referee: Cristian Garay (Chile)
24 September 2020
21:00 UTC−5

| Delfín (Ecuador) | 1–2 | (Brazil) Santos |
|---|---|---|
| Rojas 74' | Report | Marinho 18'; Jean Mota 82' |

Estadio Jocay, Manta
Attendance: 0
Referee: Kevin Ortega (Peru)

1 October 2020
18:00 UTC−4

| Olimpia (Paraguay) | 2–3 | (Brazil) Santos |
|---|---|---|
| Recalde 22', 33' | Report | Sánchez 14' (pen.); Marinho 40'; Kaio Jorge 58' |

Estadio Manuel Ferreira, Asunción
Attendance: 0
Referee: Néstor Pitana (Argentina)
1 October 2020
21:00 UTC−5

| Delfín (Ecuador) | 3–0 | (Argentina) Defensa y Justicia |
|---|---|---|
| Corozo 12'; Valencia 72'; Garcés 75' | Report |

Estadio Jocay, Manta
Attendance: 0
Referee: Diego Haro (Peru)

20 October 2020
19:15 UTC−3

| Olimpia (Paraguay) | 0–1 | (Ecuador) Delfín |
|---|---|---|
| | Report | Ale 81' |

Estadio Manuel Ferreira, Asunción
Attendance: 0
Referee: Gustavo Tejera (Uruguay)
20 October 2020
19:15 UTC−3

| Santos (Brazil) | 2–1 | (Argentina) Defensa y Justicia |
|---|---|---|
| Braga 78'; Marcos Leonardo 90+1' | Report | Romero 51' |

Estádio Urbano Caldeira, Santos
Attendance: 0
Referee: Leodán González (Uruguay)

=== Group H ===
| Pos | Team | Pld | W | D | L | GF | GA | GD | Pts | Qualification | BOC | LIB | CAR | DIM |
|---|---|---|---|---|---|---|---|---|---|---|---|---|---|---|
| 1 | (Argentina) Boca Juniors | 6 | 4 | 2 | 0 | 10 | 1 | +9 | 14 | Round of 16 | — | 0–0 | 3–0 | 3–0 |
| 2 | (Paraguay) Libertad | 6 | 2 | 1 | 3 | 8 | 11 | −3 | 7 | Round of 16 | 0–2 | — | 3–2 | 2–4 |
| 3 | (Venezuela) Caracas | 6 | 2 | 1 | 3 | 8 | 12 | −4 | 7 | Copa Sudamericana | 1–1 | 2–1 | — | 0–2 |
| 4 | (Colombia) Independiente Medellín | 6 | 2 | 0 | 4 | 9 | 11 | −2 | 6 | | 0–1 | 1–2 | 2–3 | — |

Source: CONMEBOL
3 March 2020
19:30 UTC−5

| Independiente Medellín (Colombia) | 1–2 | (Paraguay) Libertad |
|---|---|---|
| Murillo 59' | Report | Bocanegra 3'; Cardozo 28' |

Estadio Atanasio Girardot, Medellín
Referee: Kevin Ortega (Peru)
3 March 2020
20:30 UTC−4

| Caracas (Venezuela) | 1–1 | (Argentina) Boca Juniors |
|---|---|---|
| Hernández 55' | Report | Ábila 25' |

Estadio Olímpico de la UCV, Caracas
Referee: Esteban Ostojich (Uruguay)

10 March 2020
21:30 UTC−3

| Libertad (Paraguay) | 3–2 | (Venezuela) Caracas |
|---|---|---|
| Ferreira 19', 64'; Franco 80' | Report | Contreras 26'; Blanco 43' |

Estadio General Pablo Rojas, Asunción (Note: Libertad played their home matches at Estadio General Pablo Rojas, Asunción, instead of their regular stadium Estadio Dr. Nicolás Leoz, Asunción.)
Referee: Ángelo Hermosilla (Chile)
10 March 2020
21:30 UTC−3

| Boca Juniors (Argentina) | 3–0 | (Colombia) Independiente Medellín |
|---|---|---|
| Salvio 35', 57'; Reynoso 72' | Report |

Estadio Alberto J. Armando, Buenos Aires
Referee: Guillermo Guerrero (Ecuador)

16 September 2020
19:30 UTC−5

| Independiente Medellín (Colombia) | 2–3 | (Venezuela) Caracas |
|---|---|---|
| Reina 45+3' (pen.); Castro 46' | Report | Fereira 6'; Contreras 24'; Blanco 54' |

Estadio Atanasio Girardot, Medellín
Attendance: 0
Referee: Carlos Orbe (Ecuador)
17 September 2020
20:00 UTC−4

| Libertad (Paraguay) | 0–2 | (Argentina) Boca Juniors |
|---|---|---|
| | Report | Salvio 6', 84' |

Estadio General Pablo Rojas, Asunción
Attendance: 0
Referee: Rodolpho Toski (Brazil)

23 September 2020
18:15 UTC−4

| Caracas (Venezuela) | 2–1 | (Paraguay) Libertad |
|---|---|---|
| Echeverría 48' (pen.); Guarirapa 87' | Report | Espinoza 44' |

Estadio Olímpico de la UCV, Caracas
Attendance: 0
Referee: Nicolás Gallo (Colombia)
24 September 2020
19:00 UTC−5

| Independiente Medellín (Colombia) | 0–1 | (Argentina) Boca Juniors |
|---|---|---|
| | Report | Salvio 88' |

Estadio Atanasio Girardot, Medellín
Attendance: 0
Referee: Augusto Aragón (Ecuador)

29 September 2020
21:30 UTC−3

| Boca Juniors (Argentina) | 0–0 | (Paraguay) Libertad |
|---|---|---|
| | Report |

Estadio Alberto J. Armando, Buenos Aires
Attendance: 0
Referee: Roberto Tobar (Chile)
30 September 2020
18:15 UTC−4

| Caracas (Venezuela) | 0–2 | (Colombia) Independiente Medellín |
|---|---|---|
| | Report | Castro 58'; Murillo 66' |

Estadio Olímpico de la UCV, Caracas
Attendance: 0
Referee: Carlos Orbe (Ecuador)

22 October 2020
21:30 UTC−3

| Boca Juniors (Argentina) | 3–0 | (Venezuela) Caracas |
|---|---|---|
| López 27'; Tevez 33', 44' | Report |

Estadio Alberto J. Armando, Buenos Aires
Attendance: 0
Referee: Christian Ferreyra (Uruguay)
22 October 2020
21:30 UTC−3

| Libertad (Paraguay) | 2–4 | (Colombia) Independiente Medellín |
|---|---|---|
| Martínez 4'; Ferreira 79' | Report | Angulo 37'; Estupiñán 60'; Reina 63'; Monges 71' |

Estadio General Pablo Rojas, Asunción
Attendance: 0
Referee: Néstor Pitana (Argentina)
