= 2020 Copa Libertadores qualifying stages =

The 2020 Copa Libertadores qualifying stages were played from 21 January to 27 February 2020. A total of 19 teams competed in the qualifying stages to decide four of the 32 places in the group stage of the 2020 Copa Libertadores.

== Draw ==
The draw for the qualifying stages was held on 17 December 2019, 20:30 PYST (UTC−3), at the CONMEBOL Convention Centre in Luque, Paraguay.

Teams were seeded by their CONMEBOL ranking of the Copa Libertadores as of 15 December 2019 (shown in parentheses), taking into account the following three factors:

1. Performance in the last 10 years, taking into account Copa Libertadores results in the period 2010–2019
2. Historical coefficient, taking into account Copa Libertadores results in the period 1960–2009
3. Local tournament champion, with bonus points awarded to domestic league champions of the last 10 years

For the first stage, the six teams were drawn into three ties (E1–E3), with the teams from Pot 1 hosting the second leg.

First stage draw
Pot 1	Pot 2
(Ecuador) Barcelona (23); (Paraguay) Guaraní (34); (Peru) Universitario (43)	(Uruguay) Progreso (132); (Venezuela) Carabobo (147); (Bolivia) San José (70)

Notes

1. ^{BOL} The identity of the team Bolivia 4 was not known at the time of the draw, and was seeded in Pot 2.

For the second stage, the 16 teams were drawn into eight ties (C1–C8), with the teams from Pot 1 hosting the second leg. Teams from the same association could not be drawn into the same tie, excluding the three winners of the first stage, which were allocated to Pot 2 and whose identity was not known at the time of the draw, and could be drawn into the same tie with another team from the same association.

Second stage draw
Pot 1	Pot 2
(Paraguay) Cerro Porteño (11); (Brazil) Internacional (16); (Brazil) Corinthians (18); (Peru) Sporting Cristal (31); (Argentina) Atlético Tucumán (50); (Venezuela) Deportivo Táchira (51); (Colombia) Deportes Tolima (58); (Chile) Palestino (66)	(Colombia) Independiente Medellín (68); (Ecuador) Macará (170); (Uruguay) Cerro Largo (207); (Bolivia) The Strongest (28); Universidad de Chile (33); First stage winner E1; First stage winner E2; First stage winner E3

Notes

1. ^{BOL} The identity of the team Bolivia 3 was not known at the time of the draw, and was seeded in Pot 2.
2. ^{CHI} The identity of the team Chile 4 was not known at the time of the draw, and was seeded in Pot 2.

For the third stage, the eight winners of the second stage were allocated without any draw into the following four ties (G1–G4), with the team in each tie with the higher CONMEBOL ranking hosting the second leg. As their identity was not known at the time of the draw, they could be drawn into the same tie with another team from the same association.

- Second stage winner C1 vs. Second stage winner C8
- Second stage winner C2 vs. Second stage winner C7
- Second stage winner C3 vs. Second stage winner C6
- Second stage winner C4 vs. Second stage winner C5

== Format ==
In the qualifying stages, each tie was played on a home-and-away two-legged basis. If tied on aggregate, the away goals rule was used. If still tied, extra time was not played, and a penalty shoot-out was used to determine the winner (Regulations Article 2.4.3).

== Bracket ==
The qualifying stages were structured as follows:

- First stage (6 teams): The three winners of the first stage advanced to the second stage to join the 13 teams which were given byes to the second stage.
- Second stage (16 teams): The eight winners of the second stage advanced to the third stage.
- Third stage (8 teams): The four winners of the third stage advanced to the group stage to join the 28 direct entrants. The two best teams eliminated in the third stage entered the Copa Sudamericana second stage.

The bracket was decided based on the first stage draw and second stage draw, which was held on 17 December 2019.

=== G1 ===
First stage
(Uruguay) Progreso	0	1	1
(Ecuador) Barcelona	2	3	5
(Peru) Sporting Cristal	Bye
(Venezuela) Carabobo	1	0	1
(Peru) Universitario	1	1	2
(Paraguay) Cerro Porteño	Bye

Second stage
(Ecuador) Barcelona	4	1	5
(Peru) Sporting Cristal	0	2	2
(Peru) Universitario	1	0	1
(Paraguay) Cerro Porteño	1	1	2

Third stage
(Ecuador) Barcelona	1	4	5
(Paraguay) Cerro Porteño	0	0	0

=== G2 ===
First stage
(Uruguay) Cerro Largo	Bye
(Chile) Palestino	Bye
(Bolivia) San José	0	0	0
(Paraguay) Guaraní	1	4	5
(Brazil) Corinthians	Bye

Second stage
(Uruguay) Cerro Largo	1	1	2
(Chile) Palestino	1	5	6
(Paraguay) Guaraní (a)	1	1	2
(Brazil) Corinthians	0	2	2

Third stage
(Chile) Palestino	0	1	1
(Paraguay) Guaraní	1	2	3

=== G3 ===
First stage
(Colombia) Independiente Medellín	Bye
(Venezuela) Deportivo Táchira	Bye
(Bolivia) The Strongest	Bye
(Argentina) Atlético Tucumán	Bye

Second stage
(Colombia) Independiente Medellín	4	0	4
(Venezuela) Deportivo Táchira	0	2	2
(Bolivia) The Strongest	2	0	2 (5)
(Argentina) Atlético Tucumán (p)	0	2	2 (6)

Third stage
(Colombia) Independiente Medellín (p)	1	0	1 (4)
(Argentina) Atlético Tucumán	0	1	1 (2)

=== G4 ===
First stage
(Ecuador) Macará	Bye
(Colombia) Deportes Tolima	Bye
Universidad de Chile	Bye
(Brazil) Internacional	Bye

Second stage
(Ecuador) Macará	0	0	0
(Colombia) Deportes Tolima	1	1	2
Universidad de Chile	0	0	0
(Brazil) Internacional	0	2	2

Third stage
(Colombia) Deportes Tolima	0	0	0
(Brazil) Internacional	0	1	1

== First stage ==
The first legs were played on 21–22 January, and the second legs were played on 28–29 January 2020.

Team 1	Agg.	Team 2	1st leg	2nd leg
San José (Bolivia)	0–5	(Paraguay) Guaraní	0–1	0–4
Carabobo (Venezuela)	1–2	(Peru) Universitario	1–1	0–1
Progreso (Uruguay)	1–5	(Ecuador) Barcelona	0–2	1–3

=== Match E1 ===
22 January 2020
18:15 UTC−4

San José (Bolivia)	0–1	(Paraguay) Guaraní
	Report	Báez 85' (pen.)

Estadio Jesús Bermúdez, Oruro
Referee: Augusto Aragón (Ecuador)

29 January 2020
19:15 UTC−3

Guaraní (Paraguay)	4–0	(Bolivia) San José
É. Benítez 17'; Maná 25'; F. Fernández 78'; Redes 84'	Report

Estadio Luis Alfonso Giagni, Villa Elisa (Note: Guaraní played their first stage home match at Estadio Luis Alfonso Giagni, Villa Elisa, and their second and third stage home matches at Estadio General Pablo Rojas, Asunción instead of their regular stadium Estadio Rogelio Livieres, Asunción, which did not meet CONMEBOL requirements.)
Referee: Fernando Echenique (Argentina)

Guaraní won 5–0 on aggregate and advanced to the second stage (Match C7).

=== Match E2 ===
21 January 2020
18:15 UTC−4

Carabobo (Venezuela)	1–1	(Peru) Universitario
Tortolero 46'	Report	Dos Santos 83'

Polideportivo Cachamay, Ciudad Guayana (Note: Carabobo played their home match at Polideportivo Cachamay, Ciudad Guayana, instead of their regular stadium Estadio Misael Delgado, Valencia, which was being remodeled.)
Referee: Alexander Ospina (Colombia)

28 January 2020
19:30 UTC−5

Universitario (Peru)	1–0	(Venezuela) Carabobo
Alonso 24'	Report

Estadio Monumental, Lima
Referee: Bráulio Machado (Brazil)

Universitario won 2–1 on aggregate and advanced to the second stage (Match C1).

=== Match E3 ===
22 January 2020
21:30 UTC−3

Progreso (Uruguay)	0–2	(Ecuador) Barcelona
	Report	F. Martínez 22'; L. Martínez 48'

Parque Alfredo Víctor Viera, Montevideo (Note: Progreso played their home match at Parque Alfredo Víctor Viera, Montevideo, instead of their regular stadium Parque Abraham Paladino, Montevideo, which did not meet CONMEBOL requirements.)
Referee: Eduardo Gamboa (Chile)

29 January 2020
19:30 UTC−5

Barcelona (Ecuador)	3–1	(Uruguay) Progreso
Díaz 13'; F. Martínez 57'; Velasco 73'	Report	Rosso 56'

Estadio Monumental Isidro Romero Carbo, Guayaquil
Referee: Arnaldo Samaniego (Paraguay)

Barcelona won 5–1 on aggregate and advanced to the second stage (Match C8).

== Second stage ==
The first legs were played on 4–6 February, and the second legs were played on 11–13 February 2020.

Team 1	Agg.	Team 2	1st leg	2nd leg
Universitario (Peru)	1–2	(Paraguay) Cerro Porteño	1–1	0–1
Cerro Largo (Uruguay)	2–6	(Chile) Palestino	1–1	1–5
Independiente Medellín (Colombia)	4–2	(Venezuela) Deportivo Táchira	4–0	0–2
Macará (Ecuador)	0–2	(Colombia) Deportes Tolima	0–1	0–1
Universidad de Chile	0–2	(Brazil) Internacional	0–0	0–2
The Strongest (Bolivia)	2–2 (5–6 p)	(Argentina) Atlético Tucumán	2–0	0–2
Guaraní (Paraguay)	2–2 (a)	(Brazil) Corinthians	1–0	1–2
Barcelona (Ecuador)	5–2	(Peru) Sporting Cristal	4–0	1–2

=== Match C1 ===
5 February 2020
17:15 UTC−5

Universitario (Peru)	1–1	(Paraguay) Cerro Porteño
Dos Santos 52'	Report	Ruiz 65'

Estadio Monumental, Lima
Referee: Andrés Rojas (Colombia)

12 February 2020
19:15 UTC−3

Cerro Porteño (Paraguay)	1–0	(Peru) Universitario
Carrizo 61'	Report

Estadio General Pablo Rojas, Asunción
Referee: Patricio Loustau (Argentina)

Cerro Porteño won 2–1 on aggregate and advanced to the third stage (Match G1).

=== Match C2 ===
5 February 2020
19:15 UTC−3

Cerro Largo (Uruguay)	1–1	(Chile) Palestino
Borges 29'	Report	Benítez 71'

Estadio Domingo Burgueño Miguel, Maldonado (Note: Cerro Largo played their home match against Palestino at Estadio Domingo Burgueño Miguel, Maldonado, instead of their regular stadium Estadio Arquitecto Antonio Eleuterio Ubilla, Melo.)
Referee: Fernando Rapallini (Argentina)

12 February 2020
19:15 UTC−3

Palestino (Chile)	5–1	(Uruguay) Cerro Largo
Carrasco 18'; Farías 34', 76'; Benegas 71'; Tarifeño 88'	Report	Borges 78'

Estadio San Carlos de Apoquindo, Santiago (Note: Palestino played their home matches at Estadio San Carlos de Apoquindo, Santiago, instead of their regular stadium Estadio Municipal de La Cisterna, Santiago, which did not meet CONMEBOL requirements.)
Referee: Nicolás Gallo (Colombia)

Palestino won 6–2 on aggregate and advanced to the third stage (Match G2).

=== Match C3 ===
4 February 2020
19:30 UTC−5

Independiente Medellín (Colombia)	4–0	(Venezuela) Deportivo Táchira
Reina 3' (pen.), 43'; Angulo 23'; Cuesta 70'	Report

Estadio Atanasio Girardot, Medellín
Referee: Leodán González (Uruguay)

11 February 2020
18:15 UTC−4

Deportivo Táchira (Venezuela)	2–0	(Colombia) Independiente Medellín
Cermeño 38'; Angarita 68'	Report

Estadio Polideportivo de Pueblo Nuevo, San Cristóbal
Referee: Andrés Matonte (Uruguay)

Independiente Medellín won 4–2 on aggregate and advanced to the third stage (Match G3).

=== Match C4 ===
4 February 2020
19:30 UTC−5

Macará (Ecuador)	0–1	(Colombia) Deportes Tolima
	Report	Campaz 76'

Estadio Bellavista, Ambato
Referee: Michael Espinoza (Peru)

11 February 2020
19:30 UTC−5

Deportes Tolima (Colombia)	1–0	(Ecuador) Macará
Campaz 42'	Report

Estadio Manuel Murillo Toro, Ibagué
Referee: Juan Benítez (Paraguay)

Deportes Tolima won 2–0 on aggregate and advanced to the third stage (Match G4).

=== Match C5 ===
4 February 2020
18:00 UTC−3 (Note: The Universidad de Chile v Internacional match was originally scheduled for 4 February 2020, 19:15 local time, but was re-scheduled to 18:00 local time.)

Universidad de Chile	0–0	(Brazil) Internacional
	Report

Estadio Nacional Julio Martínez Prádanos, Santiago
Referee: Facundo Tello (Argentina)

11 February 2020
19:15 UTC−3

Internacional (Brazil)	2–0	Universidad de Chile
Boschilia 43'; Marcos Guilherme 76'	Report

Estádio Beira-Rio, Porto Alegre
Referee: Esteban Ostojich (Uruguay)

Internacional won 2–0 on aggregate and advanced to the third stage (Match G4).

=== Match C6 ===
5 February 2020
20:30 UTC−4

The Strongest (Bolivia)	2–0	(Argentina) Atlético Tucumán
Reinoso 45+1'; Willie 69'	Report

Estadio Hernando Siles, La Paz
Referee: Guillermo Guerrero (Ecuador)

12 February 2020
21:30 UTC−3

Atlético Tucumán (Argentina)	2–0	(Bolivia) The Strongest
Ortiz 22'; Heredia 58'	Report
Penalties
Toledo (penalty missed); Carrera (penalty scored); Lucchetti (penalty scored); Lotti (penalty scored); Bravo (penalty scored); Fernández (penalty scored); Ortiz (penalty scored)	6–5	(penalty scored) Reinoso; (penalty scored) Veizaga; (penalty scored) Valverde; (penalty scored) Willie; (penalty missed) Blackburn; (penalty scored) Castillo; (penalty missed) Torres

Estadio Monumental José Fierro, Tucumán
Referee: Raphael Claus (Brazil)

Tied 2–2 on aggregate, Atlético Tucumán won on penalties and advanced to the third stage (Match G3).

=== Match C7 ===
5 February 2020
21:30 UTC−3

Guaraní (Paraguay)	1–0	(Brazil) Corinthians
Morel 7'	Report

Estadio General Pablo Rojas, Asunción
Referee: Alexis Herrera (Venezuela)

12 February 2020
21:30 UTC−3

Corinthians (Brazil)	2–1	(Paraguay) Guaraní
Luan 9'; Boselli 32'	Report	F. Fernández 53'

Arena Corinthians, São Paulo
Referee: Néstor Pitana (Argentina)

Tied 2–2 on aggregate, Guaraní won on away goals and advanced to the third stage (Match G2).

=== Match C8 ===
6 February 2020
19:30 UTC−5

Barcelona (Ecuador)	4–0	(Peru) Sporting Cristal
F. Martínez 6', 50'; Marques 13'; Álvez 82' (pen.)	Report

Estadio Monumental Isidro Romero Carbo, Guayaquil
Referee: Cristian Garay (Chile)

13 February 2020
19:30 UTC−5

Sporting Cristal (Peru)	2–1	(Ecuador) Barcelona
Sandoval 80'; Olivares 90+3' (pen.)	Report	F. Martínez 68'

Estadio Nacional, Lima (Note: Sporting Cristal played their home match at Estadio Nacional, Lima, instead of their regular stadium Estadio Alberto Gallardo, Lima, which did not meet CONMEBOL requirements.)
Referee: Wilton Sampaio (Brazil)

Barcelona won 5–2 on aggregate and advanced to the third stage (Match G1).

== Third stage ==
The first legs were played on 18–20 February, and the second legs were played on 25–27 February 2020.

Team 1	Agg.	Team 2	1st leg	2nd leg
Barcelona (Ecuador)	5–0	(Paraguay) Cerro Porteño	1–0	4–0
Palestino (Chile)	1–3	(Paraguay) Guaraní	0–1	1–2
Independiente Medellín (Colombia)	1–1 (4–2 p)	(Argentina) Atlético Tucumán	1–0	0–1
Deportes Tolima (Colombia)	0–1	(Brazil) Internacional	0–0	0–1

=== Match G1 ===
19 February 2020
19:30 UTC−5

Barcelona (Ecuador)	1–0	(Paraguay) Cerro Porteño
F. Martínez 25'	Report

Estadio Monumental Isidro Romero Carbo, Guayaquil
Referee: Gustavo Tejera (Uruguay)

26 February 2020
19:15 UTC−3

Cerro Porteño (Paraguay)	0–4	(Ecuador) Barcelona
	Report	L. Martínez 34'; F. Martínez 66', 82'; Díaz 73'

Estadio General Pablo Rojas, Asunción
Referee: Anderson Daronco (Brazil)

Barcelona won 5–0 on aggregate and advanced to the group stage (Group A).

=== Match G2 ===
20 February 2020
19:15 UTC−3

Palestino (Chile)	0–1	(Paraguay) Guaraní
	Report	Redes 45+1'

Estadio San Carlos de Apoquindo, Santiago
Referee: Facundo Tello (Argentina)

27 February 2020
19:15 UTC−3

Guaraní (Paraguay)	2–1	(Chile) Palestino
Bobadilla 49'; Redes 83'	Report	Benegas 45+1'

Estadio General Pablo Rojas, Asunción
Referee: Víctor Carrillo (Peru)

Guaraní won 3–1 on aggregate and advanced to the group stage (Group B).

=== Match G3 ===
18 February 2020
19:30 UTC−5

Independiente Medellín (Colombia)	1–0	(Argentina) Atlético Tucumán
Ricaurte 16'	Report

Estadio Atanasio Girardot, Medellín
Referee: Bruno Arleu (Brazil)

25 February 2020
21:30 UTC−3

Atlético Tucumán (Argentina)	1–0	(Colombia) Independiente Medellín
Heredia 20'	Report
Penalties
Díaz (penalty missed); Lotti (penalty missed); Aguirre (penalty scored); Monzón (penalty scored)	2–4	(penalty scored) Ricaurte; (penalty scored) Cadavid; (penalty scored) Castro; (penalty scored) Arregui

Estadio Monumental José Fierro, Tucumán
Referee: Alexis Herrera (Venezuela)

Tied 1–1 on aggregate, Independiente Medellín won on penalties and advanced to the group stage (Group H).

=== Match G4 ===
19 February 2020
19:30 UTC−5

Deportes Tolima (Colombia)	0–0	(Brazil) Internacional
	Report

Estadio Manuel Murillo Toro, Ibagué
Referee: Roberto Tobar (Chile)

26 February 2020
21:30 UTC−3

Internacional (Brazil)	1–0	(Colombia) Deportes Tolima
Guerrero 45+4'	Report

Estádio Beira-Rio, Porto Alegre
Referee: Guillermo Guerrero (Ecuador)

Internacional won 1–0 on aggregate and advanced to the group stage (Group E).

== Copa Sudamericana qualification ==
The two best teams eliminated in the third stage entered the Copa Sudamericana second stage. Only matches in the third stage were considered for the ranking of teams.

Pos	Match	Third stage losers	Pld	W	D	L	GF	GA	GD	Pts	Qualification
1	G3	(Argentina) Atlético Tucumán	2	1	0	1	1	1	0	3	Copa Sudamericana
2	G4	(Colombia) Deportes Tolima	2	0	1	1	0	1	−1	1	Copa Sudamericana
3	G2	(Chile) Palestino	2	0	0	2	1	3	−2	0	
4	G1	(Paraguay) Cerro Porteño	2	0	0	2	0	5	−5	0	

Source: CONMEBOL
Rules for classification: 1) Points; 2) Goal difference; 3) Goals scored; 4) Away goals scored; 5) CONMEBOL ranking (Regulations Article 2.2.1.6).
