= 2020 Copa Libertadores final =

- Promotional poster of the final
- Event: 2020 Copa Libertadores
Palmeiras	Santos
(Brazil)	(Brazil)
1	0
- Date: 30 January 2021
- Venue: Estádio do Maracanã, Rio de Janeiro
- Referee: Patricio Loustau (Argentina)
- Attendance: 5,000

The 2020 Copa Libertadores final was the final match which decided the winner of the 2020 Copa Libertadores, the 61st edition of the Copa Libertadores, South America's top-tier continental club football tournament organized by CONMEBOL. The match was played on 30 January 2021 at the Estádio do Maracanã in Rio de Janeiro, Brazil, between Brazilian teams Palmeiras and Santos.

The final was originally scheduled to be played on 21 November 2020. However, as the tournament had been interrupted since March 2020 due to the COVID-19 pandemic, CONMEBOL announced on 10 July 2020 that the final would be rescheduled to be played in late January 2021, with 23, 24 or 30 January being the possible dates. Eventually, on 23 November 2020, CONMEBOL confirmed that the final would be played on 30 January 2021.

Palmeiras defeated Santos 1–0 to win their second Copa Libertadores title. As champions, Palmeiras qualified for the 2020 FIFA Club World Cup in Qatar, and earned the right to play against the winners of the 2020 Copa Sudamericana in the 2021 Recopa Sudamericana. They also automatically qualified for the 2021 Copa Libertadores group stage.

As of 2025, this was the only Copa Libertadores final decided in a Brazilian derby (Clássico da Saudade), as both clubs represent the state of São Paulo.

Due to pandemic precautions, attendance was limited to 5,000 spectators.

== Venue ==
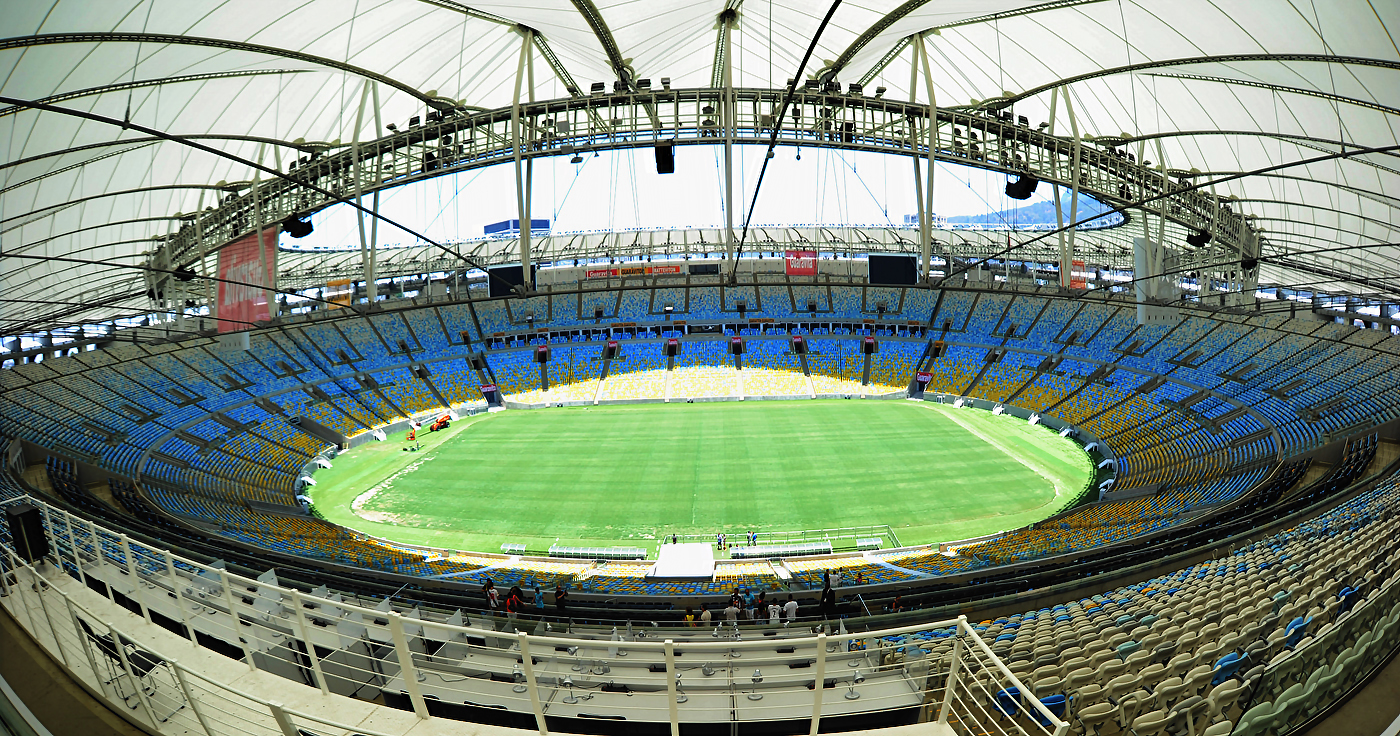
Estadio Maracanã in Rio de Janeiro hosted the final

The second Copa Libertadores final played as a single match at a pre-determined venue was held at Estádio do Maracanã in Rio de Janeiro, Brazil. This was the 34th Copa libertadores final match to take place in Brazil, and the fifth to took place in Rio de Janeiro, four of them at Maracanã and one at Estádio São Januário. The Maracanã had previously hosted the first leg of the 1963 and 1981 finals and the second leg of the 2008 finals.

=== Host selection ===
On 15 October 2019, CONMEBOL announced eight venues from three national associations that reached the final stage of the bidding process to host the 2020 final:

Association	Stadium	City	Capacity	Notes
Argentina	Estadio Mario Alberto Kempes	Córdoba	57,000	Also bid and selected to host the 2020 Copa Sudamericana final.
Brazil	Mineirão	Belo Horizonte	61,846	
Brazil	Arena do Grêmio	Porto Alegre	55,662	
Brazil	Estádio Beira-Rio	Porto Alegre	50,128	
Brazil	Estádio do Maracanã	Rio de Janeiro	78,838	
Brazil	Estádio do Morumbi	São Paulo	67,052	
Brazil	Arena Corinthians	São Paulo	49,205	
Peru	Estadio Nacional	Lima	50,000	Also bid to host the 2020 Copa Sudamericana final.

On 17 October 2019, CONMEBOL announced that Estádio do Maracanã in Rio de Janeiro, Brazil was chosen as the 2020 final venue during a meeting of its Council. The Estadio Mario Alberto Kempes in Córdoba, Argentina ended up being selected to host the 2020 Copa Sudamericana final.

== Teams ==
Team	Previous finals appearances (bold indicates winners)
(Brazil) Palmeiras	4 (1961, 1968, **1999**, 2000)
(Brazil) Santos	4 (**1962**, **1963**, 2003, **2011**)

== Road to the final ==
Note: In all scores below, the score of the home team is given first.

(Brazil) Palmeiras			Round	(Brazil) Santos		
Opponent	Venue	Score		Opponent	Venue	Score
Bye			Qualifying stages	Bye		
**Group B**			Group stage	**Group G**		
(Argentina) Tigre	Away	0–2	Group stage	(Argentina) Defensa y Justicia	Away	1–2
(Paraguay) Guaraní	Home	3–1	Group stage	(Ecuador) Delfín	Home	1–0
(Bolivia) Bolívar	Away	1–2	Group stage	(Paraguay) Olimpia	Home	0–0
(Paraguay) Guaraní	Away	0–0	Group stage	(Ecuador) Delfín	Away	1–2
(Bolivia) Bolívar	Home	5–0	Group stage	(Paraguay) Olimpia	Away	2–3
(Argentina) Tigre	Home	5–0	Group stage	(Argentina) Defensa y Justicia	Home	2–1
Pos / Team / Pld / Pts; **1** / (Brazil) Palmeiras / **6** / **16**; 2 / (Paraguay) Guaraní / 6 / **13**; 3 / (Bolivia) Bolívar / 6 / **4**; 4 / (Argentina) Tigre / 6 / **1**; Source: CONMEBOL			Group stage	Pos / Team / Pld / Pts; **1** / (Brazil) Santos / **6** / **16**; 2 / (Ecuador) Delfín / 6 / **7**; 3 / (Argentina) Defensa y Justicia / 6 / **6**; 4 / (Paraguay) Olimpia / 6 / **5**; Source: CONMEBOL		
**Seed 1**			Final stages	**Seed 2**		
(Ecuador) Delfín (won 8–1 on aggregate)	Away	1–3	Round of 16	(Ecuador) LDU Quito (tied 2–2 on aggregate, won on away goals)	Away	1–2
(Ecuador) Delfín (won 8–1 on aggregate)	Home	5–0	Round of 16	(Ecuador) LDU Quito (tied 2–2 on aggregate, won on away goals)	Home	0–1
(Paraguay) Libertad (won 4–1 on aggregate)	Away	1–1	Quarter-finals	(Brazil) Grêmio (won 5–2 on aggregate)	Away	1–1
(Paraguay) Libertad (won 4–1 on aggregate)	Home	3–0	Quarter-finals	(Brazil) Grêmio (won 5–2 on aggregate)	Home	4–1
(Argentina) River Plate (won 3–2 on aggregate)	Away	0–3	Semi-finals	(Argentina) Boca Juniors (won 3–0 on aggregate)	Away	0–0
(Argentina) River Plate (won 3–2 on aggregate)	Home	0–2	Semi-finals	(Argentina) Boca Juniors (won 3–0 on aggregate)	Home	3–0

== Pre-match ==
=== Opening ceremony ===
Sam Alves and Mariana Rios from Brazil along with Porno Graffitti, Superfly, fripSide, Takanori Nishikawa, Raychell, and One Ok Rock from Japan were part of a major live performance in a thirty-minute virtual show before the kick-off.

==== Setlist ====
- "Mugen" (performed by Porno Graffitti)
- "Tamashii Revolution" (performed by Superfly)
- "Only My Railgun" (performed by fripSide)
- "Kakumei Dualism (革命デュアリズム)" (performed by Takanori Nishikawa with Raychell)
- "We Are" (performed by One Ok Rock with Sam Alves and Mariana Rios)

== Match ==
=== Summary ===
The most memorable moment is the last 8 minutes of added time in the second half. The Santos manager, Cuca, was sent off at 90+6th minute for hassling the ball to delay Palmeiras' throw-in. The only goal of the game came in the 9th minute of second-half stoppage time, from substitute Breno Lopes, scoring with a looping header to the top right corner of the net from seven yards out after a cross from the right by Rony.

=== Details ===
30 January 2021
17:00 UTC−3

Palmeiras (Brazil)	1–0	(Brazil) Santos
Breno Lopes 90+9'	Report

Estádio do Maracanã, Rio de Janeiro
Attendance: 5,000
Referee: Patricio Loustau (Argentina)

**Palmeiras**	**Santos**

GK	1	(Brazil) Weverton
RB	2	(Brazil) Marcos Rocha	(yellow card) 90+7'
CB	13	(Brazil) Luan
CB	15	(Paraguay) Gustavo Gómez (c)	(yellow card) 35'
LB	17	(Uruguay) Matías Viña	(yellow card) 58'
DM	28	(Brazil) Danilo
RM	25	(Brazil) Gabriel Menino		(substituted off) 85'
LM	8	(Brazil) Zé Rafael		(substituted off) 78'
AM	23	(Brazil) Raphael Veiga		(substituted off) 90+12'
CF	10	(Brazil) Luiz Adriano
CF	11	(Brazil) Rony		(substituted off) 90+12'
Substitutes:
GK	22	(Brazil) Jailson
DF	3	(Brazil) Emerson Santos
DF	4	(Chile) Benjamín Kuscevic
DF	6	(Brazil) Alan Empereur		(substituted on) 90+12'
DF	12	(Brazil) Mayke
DF	26	(Brazil) Renan
DF	30	(Brazil) Felipe Melo		(substituted on) 90+12'
MF	5	(Brazil) Patrick de Paula		(substituted on) 78'
MF	14	(Brazil) Gustavo Scarpa
MF	20	(Brazil) Lucas Lima
FW	19	(Brazil) Breno Lopes	(yellow card) 90+9'	(substituted on) 85'
FW	29	(Brazil) Willian
Manager:
(Portugal) Abel Ferreira

GK	24	(Brazil) John
RB	4	(Brazil) Pará		(substituted off) 90+11'
CB	28	(Brazil) Lucas Veríssimo	(yellow card) 10'
CB	14	(Brazil) Luan Peres
LB	3	(Brazil) Felipe Jonatan		(substituted off) 90+3'
CM	18	(Brazil) Sandry		(substituted off) 73'
CM	21	(Brazil) Diego Pituca	(yellow card) 70'
CM	5	(Brazil) Alison (c)	(yellow card) 90+13'
RF	11	(Brazil) Marinho
CF	19	(Brazil) Kaio Jorge		(substituted off) 90+3'
LF	10	(Venezuela) Yeferson Soteldo	(yellow card) 90+6'
Substitutes:
GK	1	(Brazil) Vladimir
GK	30	(Brazil) João Paulo
DF	2	(Brazil) Luiz Felipe
DF	13	(Brazil) Madson		(substituted on) 90+3'
DF	20	(Brazil) Laércio
DF	27	(Brazil) Wellington Tim		(substituted on) 90+3'
MF	17	(Brazil) Jean Mota
MF	22	(Brazil) Guilherme Nunes
MF	26	(Brazil) Vinicius Balieiro
FW	23	(Brazil) Arthur Gomes
FW	33	(Brazil) Bruno Marques		(substituted on) 90+11'
FW	36	(Brazil) Lucas Braga		(substituted on) 73'
Manager:
(Brazil) Cuca			(red card) 90+6'

Assistant referees:
Ezequiel Brailovsky (Argentina)
Diego Bonfa (Argentina)
Fourth official:
Darío Herrera (Argentina)
Fifth official:
Julio Fernández (Argentina)
Video assistant referee:
Mauro Vigliano (Argentina)
Assistant video assistant referees:
Jhon Ospina (Colombia)
Juan Belatti (Argentina)
Fernando Rapallini (Argentina)

**Match rules**

- 90 minutes.
- 30 minutes of extra time if necessary.
- Penalty shoot-out if scores still level.
- Twelve named substitutes.
- Maximum of five substitutions.

== See also ==
- 2020 Copa Sudamericana final
- 2021 Recopa Sudamericana
- Clássico da Saudade
