= 2020 Copa Libertadores final stages =

The 2020 Copa Libertadores final stages were played from 24 November 2020 to 30 January 2021. A total of 16 teams competed in the final stages to decide the champions of the 2020 Copa Libertadores, with the final played in Rio de Janeiro, Brazil at the Estádio do Maracanã.

The final stages had been originally scheduled to be played from 21 July to 21 November 2020, but were postponed due to the COVID-19 pandemic.

== Qualified teams ==
The winners and runners-up of each of the eight groups in the group stage advanced to the round of 16.

Group	Winners	Runners-up
A	(Brazil) Flamengo	(Ecuador) Independiente del Valle
B	(Brazil) Palmeiras	(Paraguay) Guaraní
C	(Bolivia) Jorge Wilstermann	(Brazil) Athletico Paranaense
D	(Argentina) River Plate	(Ecuador) LDU Quito
E	(Brazil) Grêmio	(Brazil) Internacional
F	(Uruguay) Nacional	(Argentina) Racing
G	(Brazil) Santos	(Ecuador) Delfín
H	(Argentina) Boca Juniors	(Paraguay) Libertad

=== Seeding ===
Starting from the round of 16, the teams were seeded according to their results in the group stage, with the group winners (Pot 1) seeded 1–8, and the group runners-up (Pot 2) seeded 9–16.

Seed	Grp	Team	Pld	W	D	L	GF	GA	GD	Pts	Round of 16 draw
1	B	(Brazil) Palmeiras	6	5	1	0	17	2	+15	16	Pot 1
2	G	(Brazil) Santos	6	5	1	0	10	5	+5	16	Pot 1
3	A	(Brazil) Flamengo	6	5	0	1	14	8	+6	15	Pot 1
4	F	(Uruguay) Nacional	6	5	0	1	9	3	+6	15	Pot 1
5	H	(Argentina) Boca Juniors	6	4	2	0	10	1	+9	14	Pot 1
6	D	(Argentina) River Plate	6	4	1	1	21	6	+15	13	Pot 1
7	E	(Brazil) Grêmio	6	3	2	1	6	3	+3	11	Pot 1
8	C	(Bolivia) Jorge Wilstermann	6	3	1	2	8	5	+3	10	Pot 1
9	F	(Argentina) Racing	6	5	0	1	9	4	+5	15	Pot 2
10	B	(Paraguay) Guaraní	6	4	1	1	13	7	+6	13	Pot 2
11	A	(Ecuador) Independiente del Valle	6	4	0	2	14	8	+6	12	Pot 2
12	D	(Ecuador) LDU Quito	6	4	0	2	12	8	+4	12	Pot 2
13	C	(Brazil) Athletico Paranaense	6	3	1	2	8	6	+2	10	Pot 2
14	E	(Brazil) Internacional	6	2	2	2	8	6	+2	8	Pot 2
15	G	(Ecuador) Delfín	6	2	1	3	6	7	−1	7	Pot 2
16	H	(Paraguay) Libertad	6	2	1	3	8	11	−3	7	Pot 2

Source: CONMEBOL
Rules for classification: 1) Higher position in group; 2) Points; 3) Goal difference; 4) Goals scored; 5) Away goals scored; 6) CONMEBOL ranking (Regulations Article 22.i).

== Format ==
Starting from the round of 16, the teams played a single-elimination tournament with the following rules:

- In the round of 16, quarter-finals and semi-finals, each tie was played on a home-and-away two-legged basis, with the higher-seeded team hosting the second leg (Regulations Article 2.2.3.2). If tied on aggregate, the away goals rule was used. If still tied, extra time was not played, and a penalty shoot-out was used to determine the winners (Regulations Article 2.4.3).
- The final was played as a single match at a venue pre-selected by the CONMEBOL, with the higher-seeded team designated as the "home" team for administrative purposes (Regulations Article 2.2.3.5). If tied after regulation, 30 minutes of extra time were played. If still tied after extra time, a penalty shoot-out was used to determine the winners (Regulations Article 2.4.4).

== Draw ==
The draw for the round of 16 was held on 23 October 2020, 12:00 PYT (UTC−3). For the round of 16, the 16 teams were drawn into eight ties (A–H) between a group winner (Pot 1) and a group runner-up (Pot 2), with the group winners hosting the second leg. Teams from the same association or the same group could be drawn into the same tie (Regulations Article 2.2.3.2).

== Bracket ==
The bracket starting from the round of 16 was determined as follows:

Round	Matchups
Round of 16	(Group winners hosted second leg, matchups decided by draw): Match A; Match B; Match C; Match D; Match E; Match F; Match G; Match H
Quarter-finals	(Higher-seeded team hosted second leg): Match S1: Winner A vs. Winner H; Match S2: Winner B vs. Winner G; Match S3: Winner C vs. Winner F; Match S4: Winner D vs. Winner E
Semi-finals	(Higher-seeded team hosted second leg): Match F1: Winner S1 vs. Winner S4; Match F2: Winner S2 vs. Winner S3
Final	(Higher-seeded team designated as "home" team): Winner F1 vs. Winner F2

The bracket was decided based on the round of 16 draw, which was held on 23 October 2020.

Round of 16
13	(Brazil) Athletico Paranaense	1	0	1
6	(Argentina) River Plate	1	1	2
11	(Ecuador) Independiente del Valle	0	0	0 (2)
4	(Uruguay) Nacional (p)	0	0	0 (4)
16	(Paraguay) Libertad	3	2	5
8	(Bolivia) Jorge Wilstermann	1	0	1
15	(Ecuador) Delfín	1	0	1
1	(Brazil) Palmeiras	3	5	8
9	(Argentina) Racing (p)	1	1	2 (5)
3	(Brazil) Flamengo	1	1	2 (3)
14	(Brazil) Internacional	0	1	1 (4)
5	(Argentina) Boca Juniors (p)	1	0	1 (5)
10	(Paraguay) Guaraní	0	0	0
7	(Brazil) Grêmio	2	2	4
12	(Ecuador) LDU Quito	1	1	2
2	(Brazil) Santos (a)	2	0	2

Quarter-finals
6	(Argentina) River Plate	2	6	8
4	(Uruguay) Nacional	0	2	2
16	(Paraguay) Libertad	1	0	1
1	(Brazil) Palmeiras	1	3	4
9	(Argentina) Racing	1	0	1
5	(Argentina) Boca Juniors	0	2	2
7	(Brazil) Grêmio	1	1	2
2	(Brazil) Santos	1	4	5

Semi-finals
6	(Argentina) River Plate	0	2	2
1	(Brazil) Palmeiras	3	0	3
5	(Argentina) Boca Juniors	0	0	0
2	(Brazil) Santos	0	3	3

Final
30 January 2021 – Rio de Janeiro
1	(Brazil) Palmeiras	1
2	(Brazil) Santos	0

== Round of 16 ==
The first legs were played on 24–26 November and 2 December, and the second legs were played on 1–3 and 9 December 2020.

Team 1	Agg.	Team 2	1st leg	2nd leg
Guaraní (Paraguay)	0–4	(Brazil) Grêmio	0–2	0–2
Independiente del Valle (Ecuador)	0–0 (2–4 p)	(Uruguay) Nacional	0–0	0–0
Delfín (Ecuador)	1–8	(Brazil) Palmeiras	1–3	0–5
Internacional (Brazil)	1–1 (4–5 p)	(Argentina) Boca Juniors	0–1	1–0
Racing (Argentina)	2–2 (5–3 p)	(Brazil) Flamengo	1–1	1–1
Libertad (Paraguay)	5–1	(Bolivia) Jorge Wilstermann	3–1	2–0
Athletico Paranaense (Brazil)	1–2	(Argentina) River Plate	1–1	0–1
LDU Quito (Ecuador)	2–2 (a)	(Brazil) Santos	1–2	1–0

=== Match A ===
26 November 2020
21:30 UTC−3

Guaraní (Paraguay)	0–2	(Brazil) Grêmio
	Report	Jean Pyerre 56'; Pepê 86'

Estadio Defensores del Chaco, Asunción (Note: Guaraní played their home match at Estadio Defensores del Chaco, Asunción, instead of their regular stadium Estadio Rogelio Livieres, Asunción which did not meet CONMEBOL requirements.)
Attendance: 0
Referee: Guillermo Guerrero (Ecuador)

3 December 2020
21:30 UTC−3

Grêmio (Brazil)	2–0	(Paraguay) Guaraní
Ferreira 3'; Rodrigues 90+7'	Report

Arena do Grêmio, Porto Alegre
Attendance: 0
Referee: Wilmar Roldán (Colombia)

Grêmio won 4–0 on aggregate and advanced to the quarter-finals (Match S1).

=== Match B ===
25 November 2020
17:15 UTC−5

Independiente del Valle (Ecuador)	0–0	(Uruguay) Nacional
	Report

Estadio Rodrigo Paz Delgado, Quito (Note: Independiente del Valle played their home match at Estadio Rodrigo Paz Delgado, Quito, instead of their regular stadium Estadio Rumiñahui, Sangolquí which did not meet CONMEBOL requirements.)
Attendance: 0
Referee: Raphael Claus (Brazil)

2 December 2020
19:15 UTC−3

Nacional (Uruguay)	0–0	(Ecuador) Independiente del Valle
	Report
Penalties
Bergessio (penalty scored); Castro (penalty scored); Yacob (penalty scored); Carballo (penalty missed); Martínez (penalty scored)	4–2	(penalty missed) Pellerano; (penalty scored) Mera; (penalty scored) Torres; (penalty missed) Schunke

Estadio Gran Parque Central, Montevideo
Attendance: 0
Referee: Juan Benítez (Paraguay)

Tied 0–0 on aggregate, Nacional won on penalties and advanced to the quarter-finals (Match S2).

=== Match C ===
25 November 2020
17:15 UTC−5

Delfín (Ecuador)	1–3	(Brazil) Palmeiras
Ramires 69' (o.g.)	Report	Menino 18'; Rony 36' (pen.); Zé Rafael 60'

Estadio Jocay, Manta
Attendance: 0
Referee: Leodán González (Uruguay)

2 December 2020
19:15 UTC−3

Palmeiras (Brazil)	5–0	(Ecuador) Delfín
Patrick 29'; Veron 49', 60'; Willian 52'; Danilo 90+4'	Report

Allianz Parque, São Paulo
Attendance: 0
Referee: Darío Herrera (Argentina)

Palmeiras won 8–1 on aggregate and advanced to the quarter-finals (Match S3).

=== Match D ===
2 December 2020 (Note: The two legs of the round of 16 match D, originally scheduled for 25 November & 2 December 2020, 21:30 local time, were re-scheduled to 2 & 9 December 2020, 21:30 local time due to the death of Diego Maradona on 25 November 2020 and his link to the club Boca Juniors.)
21:30 UTC−3

Internacional (Brazil)	0–1	(Argentina) Boca Juniors
	Report	Tevez 63'

Estádio Beira-Rio, Porto Alegre
Attendance: 0
Referee: Esteban Ostojich (Uruguay)

9 December 2020
21:30 UTC−3

Boca Juniors (Argentina)	0–1	(Brazil) Internacional
	Report	Fabra 48' (o.g.)
Penalties
Tevez (penalty scored); Cardona (penalty missed); Salvio (penalty scored); Fabra (penalty scored); Izquierdoz (penalty scored); Jara (penalty scored)	5–4	(penalty scored) Rodinei; (penalty scored) Edenílson; (penalty missed) Lindoso; (penalty scored) Yuri Alberto; (penalty scored) Fernández; (penalty missed) Peglow

Estadio Alberto J. Armando, Buenos Aires
Attendance: 0
Referee: Roberto Tobar (Chile)

Tied 1–1 on aggregate, Boca Juniors won on penalties and advanced to the quarter-finals (Match S4).

=== Match E ===
24 November 2020
21:30 UTC−3

Racing (Argentina)	1–1	(Brazil) Flamengo
Fértoli 13'	Report	Gabriel Barbosa 15'

Estadio Presidente Juan Domingo Perón, Avellaneda
Attendance: 0
Referee: Alexis Herrera (Venezuela)

1 December 2020
21:30 UTC−3

Flamengo (Brazil)	1–1	(Argentina) Racing
Willian Arão 90+3'	Report	Sigali 65'
Penalties
Filipe Luís (penalty scored); Gerson (penalty scored); Pedro (penalty scored); Willian Arão (penalty missed)	3–5	(penalty scored) López; (penalty scored) Rojas; (penalty scored) Sigali; (penalty scored) Alcaraz; (penalty scored) Domínguez

Estádio do Maracanã, Rio de Janeiro
Attendance: 0
Referee: Roberto Tobar (Chile)

Tied 2–2 on aggregate, Racing won on penalties and advanced to the quarter-finals (Match S4).

=== Match F ===
25 November 2020
21:30 UTC−3

Libertad (Paraguay)	3–1	(Bolivia) Jorge Wilstermann
Enciso 46'; Cardozo 69'; Martínez 90+6'	Report	Osorio 74'

Estadio General Pablo Rojas, Asunción (Note: Libertad played their home match against Jorge Wilstermann at Estadio General Pablo Rojas, Asunción, and played their home match against Palmeiras at Estadio Defensores del Chaco, Asunción instead of their regular stadium Estadio Dr. Nicolás Leoz, Asunción which did not meet CONMEBOL requirements.)
Attendance: 0
Referee: Anderson Daronco (Brazil)

2 December 2020
20:30 UTC−4

Jorge Wilstermann (Bolivia)	0–2	(Paraguay) Libertad
	Report	Cardozo 67', 79'

Estadio Félix Capriles, Cochabamba
Attendance: 0
Referee: Patricio Loustau (Argentina)

Libertad won 5–1 on aggregate and advanced to the quarter-finals (Match S3).

=== Match G ===
24 November 2020
19:15 UTC−3

Athletico Paranaense (Brazil)	1–1	(Argentina) River Plate
Bissoli 57'	Report	Díaz 90'

Arena da Baixada, Curitiba
Attendance: 0
Referee: Andrés Rojas (Colombia)

1 December 2020
19:15 UTC−3

River Plate (Argentina)	1–0	(Brazil) Athletico Paranaense
De La Cruz 84'	Report

Estadio Libertadores de América, Avellaneda (Note: River Plate played their home matches at Estadio Libertadores de América, Avellaneda instead of their regular stadium Estadio Monumental Antonio Vespucio Liberti, Buenos Aires, which was closed for remodeling works.)
Attendance: 0
Referee: Jesús Valenzuela (Venezuela)

River Plate won 2–1 on aggregate and advanced to the quarter-finals (Match S2).

=== Match H ===
24 November 2020
17:15 UTC−5

LDU Quito (Ecuador)	1–2	(Brazil) Santos
Julio 45+2'	Report	Soteldo 7'; Marinho 59' (pen.)

Estadio Rodrigo Paz Delgado, Quito
Attendance: 0
Referee: Fernando Rapallini (Argentina)

1 December 2020
19:15 UTC−3

Santos (Brazil)	0–1	(Ecuador) LDU Quito
	Report	Zunino 66'

Estádio Urbano Caldeira, Santos
Attendance: 0
Referee: Néstor Pitana (Argentina)

Tied 2–2 on aggregate, Santos won on away goals and advanced to the quarter-finals (Match S1).

== Quarter-finals ==
The first legs were played on 8–10 and 16 December, and the second legs were played on 15–17 and 23 December 2020.

Team 1	Agg.	Team 2	1st leg	2nd leg
Grêmio (Brazil)	2–5	(Brazil) Santos	1–1	1–4
River Plate (Argentina)	8–2	(Uruguay) Nacional	2–0	6–2
Libertad (Paraguay)	1–4	(Brazil) Palmeiras	1–1	0–3
Racing (Argentina)	1–2	(Argentina) Boca Juniors	1–0	0–2

=== Match S1 ===
9 December 2020
19:15 UTC−3

Grêmio (Brazil)	1–1	(Brazil) Santos
Diego Souza 90+12' (pen.)	Report	Kaio Jorge 36'

Arena do Grêmio, Porto Alegre
Attendance: 0
Referee: Juan Benítez (Paraguay)

16 December 2020
19:15 UTC−3

Santos (Brazil)	4–1	(Brazil) Grêmio
Kaio Jorge 1', 54'; Marinho 16'; Laércio 83'	Report	Thaciano 81'

Estádio Urbano Caldeira, Santos
Attendance: 0
Referee: Wilmar Roldán (Colombia)

Santos won 5–2 on aggregate and advanced to the semi-finals (Match F1).

=== Match S2 ===
10 December 2020
21:30 UTC−3

River Plate (Argentina)	2–0	(Uruguay) Nacional
Montiel 67' (pen.); Zuculini 90+6'	Report

Estadio Libertadores de América, Avellaneda
Attendance: 0
Referee: Andrés Rojas (Colombia)

17 December 2020
21:30 UTC−3

Nacional (Uruguay)	2–6	(Argentina) River Plate
Cougo 45+1'; Rodríguez 54'	Report	Carrascal 28'; De La Cruz 45'; Zuculini 50'; Borré 67', 73', 80'

Estadio Gran Parque Central, Montevideo
Attendance: 0
Referee: Roberto Tobar (Chile)

River Plate won 8–2 on aggregate and advanced to the semi-finals (Match F2).

=== Match S3 ===
8 December 2020
21:30 UTC−3

Libertad (Paraguay)	1–1	(Brazil) Palmeiras
Espinoza 62'	Report	Gómez 39'

Estadio Defensores del Chaco, Asunción
Attendance: 0
Referee: Fernando Rapallini (Argentina)

15 December 2020
21:30 UTC−3

Palmeiras (Brazil)	3–0	(Paraguay) Libertad
Scarpa 21'; Rony 68'; Menino 82'	Report

Allianz Parque, São Paulo
Attendance: 0
Referee: Jesús Valenzuela (Venezuela)

Palmeiras won 4–1 on aggregate and advanced to the semi-finals (Match F2).

=== Match S4 ===
16 December 2020
21:30 UTC−3

Racing (Argentina)	1–0	(Argentina) Boca Juniors
Melgarejo 60'	Report

Estadio Presidente Juan Domingo Perón, Avellaneda
Attendance: 0
Referee: Esteban Ostojich (Uruguay)

23 December 2020
21:30 UTC−3

Boca Juniors (Argentina)	2–0	(Argentina) Racing
Salvio 23'; Villa 61' (pen.)	Report

Estadio Alberto J. Armando, Buenos Aires
Attendance: 0
Referee: Wilmar Roldán (Colombia)

Boca Juniors won 2–1 on aggregate and advanced to the semi-finals (Match F1).

== Semi-finals ==
The first legs were played on 5 and 6 January 2021, and the second legs were played on 12 and 13 January 2021.

Team 1	Agg.	Team 2	1st leg	2nd leg
Boca Juniors (Argentina)	0–3	(Brazil) Santos	0–0	0–3
River Plate (Argentina)	2–3	(Brazil) Palmeiras	0–3	2–0

=== Match F1 ===
6 January 2021
19:15 UTC−3

Boca Juniors (Argentina)	0–0	(Brazil) Santos
	Report

Estadio Alberto J. Armando, Buenos Aires
Attendance: 0
Referee: Roberto Tobar (Chile)

13 January 2021
19:15 UTC−3

Santos (Brazil)	3–0	(Argentina) Boca Juniors
Pituca 16'; Soteldo 49'; Braga 51'	Report

Estádio Urbano Caldeira, Santos
Attendance: 0
Referee: Wilmar Roldán (Colombia)

Santos won 3–0 on aggregate and advanced to the final.

=== Match F2 ===
5 January 2021
21:30 UTC−3

River Plate (Argentina)	0–3	(Brazil) Palmeiras
	Report	Rony 27'; Luiz Adriano 47'; Viña 62'

Estadio Libertadores de América, Avellaneda
Attendance: 0
Referee: Leodán González (Uruguay)

12 January 2021
21:30 UTC−3

Palmeiras (Brazil)	0–2	(Argentina) River Plate
	Report	Rojas 29'; Borré 44'

Allianz Parque, São Paulo
Attendance: 0
Referee: Esteban Ostojich (Uruguay)

Palmeiras won 3–2 on aggregate and advanced to the final.

== Final ==
The final was played on 30 January 2021 at the Estádio do Maracanã in Rio de Janeiro.

30 January 2021
17:00 UTC−3

Palmeiras (Brazil)	1–0	(Brazil) Santos
Breno Lopes 90+9'	Report

Estádio do Maracanã, Rio de Janeiro
Attendance: 5,000
Referee: Patricio Loustau (Argentina)
