= 2020 Copa Libertadores =

61st season of Copa Libertadores

Copa CONMEBOL Libertadores 2020
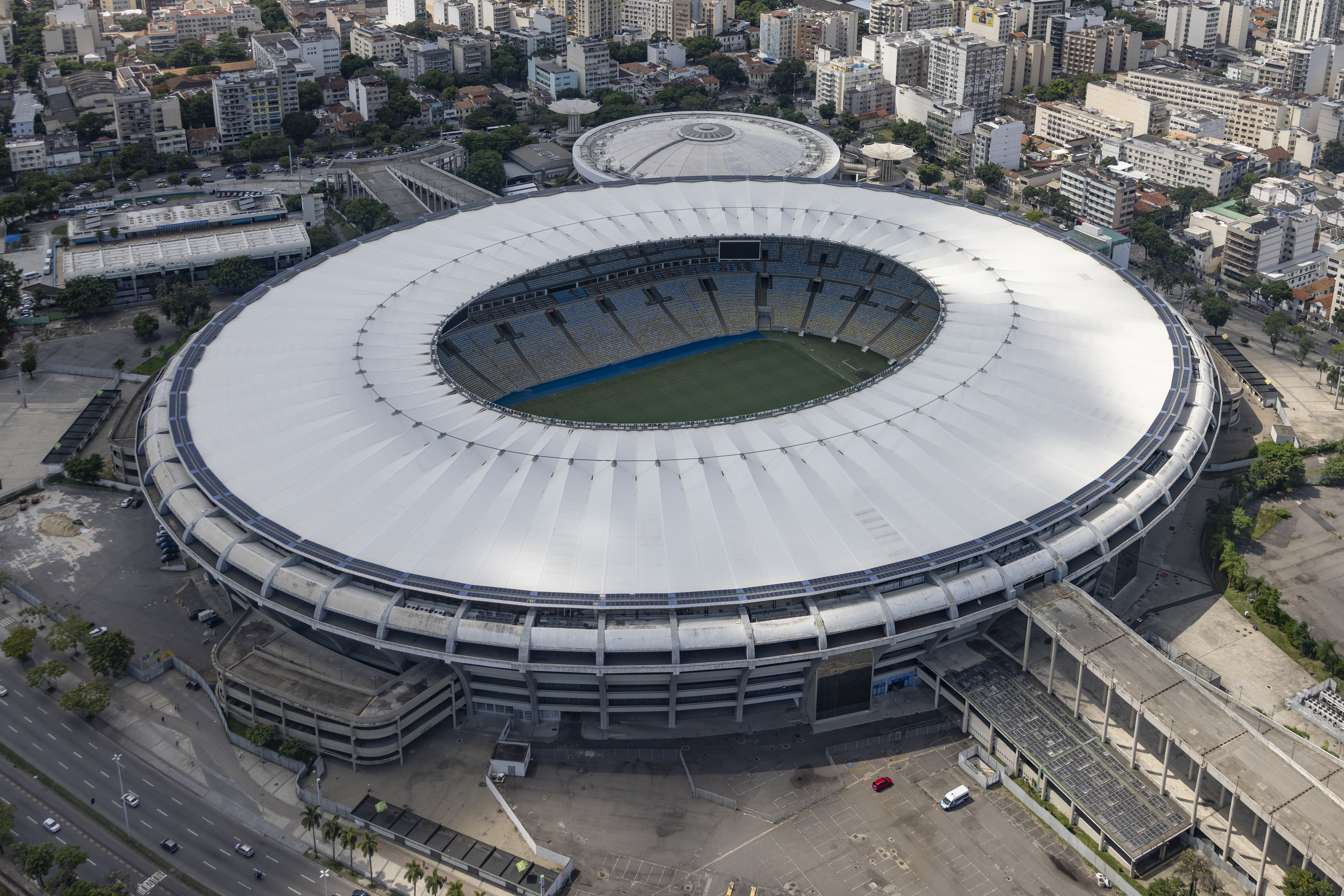
- The Estádio do Maracanã in Rio de Janeiro hosted the final

Tournament details
- Dates: 21 January 2020 – 30 January 2021
- Teams: 47 (from 10 associations)

Final positions
- Champions: (Brazil) Palmeiras (2nd title)
- Runners-up: (Brazil) Santos

Tournament statistics
- Matches played: 155
- Goals scored: 405 (2.61 per match)
- Top scorer(s): (Ecuador) Fidel Martínez (8 goals)
- Best player: (Brazil) Marinho

The 2020 Copa CONMEBOL Libertadores was the 61st edition of the CONMEBOL Libertadores (also referred to as the Copa Libertadores), South America's premier club football tournament organized by CONMEBOL.

On 17 October 2019, CONMEBOL announced that the final would be played at the Estádio do Maracanã in Rio de Janeiro, Brazil on 21 November 2020. Brazilian club Palmeiras defeated fellow Brazilian club Santos by a 1–0 score in the final to win their second tournament title. As champions, Palmeiras qualified for the 2020 FIFA Club World Cup in Qatar, and earned the right to play against the winners of the 2020 Copa Sudamericana in the 2021 Recopa Sudamericana. They also automatically qualified for the 2021 Copa Libertadores group stage. Flamengo were the defending champions, but were eliminated by Racing in the round of 16.

In March 2018, the Liga MX President, Enrique Bonilla, said that Liga MX and Major League Soccer (MLS) were open to start talks to have Mexican teams return and MLS teams from Canada and the United States to join if they could agree on terms with the CONMEBOL officials. Teams from Mexico had withdrawn from the Copa Libertadores since 2017, but could return in the future if the issue of schedule conflicts could be solved.

On 21 May 2019, CONMEBOL announced that clubs must pass certain eligibility requirements in order to compete in the 2020 Copa Libertadores and Copa Sudamericana. One of the original requirements was that teams must be in the top division of their member association, but this was removed after many associations stated that they had not adapted the regulations of their qualifying competitions for the 2020 Copa Libertadores and Copa Sudamericana.

The tournament was suspended after group stage matchday 2 due to the COVID-19 pandemic, and resumed on 15 September 2020, ending with the final on 30 January 2021.

== Teams ==
The following 47 teams from the 10 CONMEBOL member associations qualified for the tournament:

- Copa Libertadores champions
- Copa Sudamericana champions
- Brazil: 7 berths
- Argentina: 6 berths
- All other associations: 4 berths each

The entry stage was determined as follows:

- Group stage: 28 teams
  - Copa Libertadores champions
  - Copa Sudamericana champions
  - Teams which qualified for berths 1–5 from Argentina and Brazil
  - Teams which qualified for berths 1–2 from all other associations
- Second stage: 13 teams
  - Teams which qualified for berths 6–7 from Brazil
  - Team which qualified for berth 6 from Argentina
  - Teams which qualified for berths 3–4 from Chile and Colombia
  - Teams which qualified for berth 3 from all other associations
- First stage: 6 teams
  - Teams which qualified for berth 4 from Bolivia, Ecuador, Paraguay, Peru, Uruguay and Venezuela

Association	Team (Berth)	Entry stage	Qualification method
Argentina (6 berths)	Racing (Argentina 1)	Group stage	2018–19 Superliga Argentina champions
Argentina (6 berths)	Defensa y Justicia (Argentina 2)	Group stage	2018–19 Superliga Argentina runners-up
Argentina (6 berths)	River Plate (Argentina 3)	Group stage	2018–19 Copa Argentina champions
Argentina (6 berths)	Tigre (Argentina 4)	Group stage	2019 Copa de la Superliga champions
Argentina (6 berths)	Boca Juniors (Argentina 5)	Group stage	2018–19 Superliga Argentina 3rd place
Argentina (6 berths)	Atlético Tucumán (Argentina 6)	Second stage	2018–19 Superliga Argentina 5th place
Bolivia (4 berths)	Bolívar (Bolivia 1)	Group stage	2019 Apertura champions
Bolivia (4 berths)	Jorge Wilstermann (Bolivia 2)	Group stage	2019 Clausura champions
Bolivia (4 berths)	The Strongest (Bolivia 3)	Second stage	2019 Primera División aggregate table best team not yet qualified
Bolivia (4 berths)	San José (Bolivia 4)	First stage	2019 Primera División aggregate table 2nd best team not yet qualified
Brazil (7 + 1 berths)	Flamengo (Brazil 1, Title holders)	Group stage	2019 Copa Libertadores and 2019 Campeonato Brasileiro Série A champions
Brazil (7 + 1 berths)	Athletico Paranaense (Brazil 2)	Group stage	2019 Copa do Brasil champions
Brazil (7 + 1 berths)	Santos (Brazil 3)	Group stage	2019 Campeonato Brasileiro Série A runners-up
Brazil (7 + 1 berths)	Palmeiras (Brazil 4)	Group stage	2019 Campeonato Brasileiro Série A 3rd place
Brazil (7 + 1 berths)	Grêmio (Brazil 5)	Group stage	2019 Campeonato Brasileiro Série A 4th place
Brazil (7 + 1 berths)	São Paulo (Brazil 6)	Group stage	2019 Campeonato Brasileiro Série A 6th place
Brazil (7 + 1 berths)	Internacional (Brazil 7)	Second stage	2019 Campeonato Brasileiro Série A 7th place
Brazil (7 + 1 berths)	Corinthians (Brazil 8)	Second stage	2019 Campeonato Brasileiro Série A 8th place
Chile (4 berths)	Universidad Católica (Chile 1)	Group stage	2019 Primera División champions
Chile (4 berths)	Colo-Colo (Chile 2)	Group stage	2019 Primera División runners-up
Chile (4 berths)	Palestino (Chile 3)	Second stage	2019 Primera División 3rd place
Chile (4 berths)	Universidad de Chile (Chile 4)	Second stage	2019 Copa Chile runners-up
Colombia (4 berths)	Junior (Colombia 1)	Group stage	2019 Apertura champions
Colombia (4 berths)	América de Cali (Colombia 2)	Group stage	2019 Finalización champions
Colombia (4 berths)	Deportes Tolima (Colombia 3)	Second stage	2019 Primera A aggregate table best team not yet qualified
Colombia (4 berths)	Independiente Medellín (Colombia 4)	Second stage	2019 Copa Colombia champions
Ecuador (4 + 1 berths)	Independiente del Valle (Ecuador 1, Copa Sudamericana)	Group stage	2019 Copa Sudamericana champions
Ecuador (4 + 1 berths)	Delfín (Ecuador 2)	Group stage	2019 Serie A champions
Ecuador (4 + 1 berths)	LDU Quito (Ecuador 3)	Group stage	2019 Serie A runners-up
Ecuador (4 + 1 berths)	Macará (Ecuador 4)	Second stage	2019 Serie A classification table best team not yet qualified
Ecuador (4 + 1 berths)	Barcelona (Ecuador 5)	First stage	2019 Serie A classification table 2nd best team not yet qualified
Paraguay (4 berths)	Olimpia (Paraguay 1)	Group stage	2019 Apertura and 2019 Clausura champions
Paraguay (4 berths)	Libertad (Paraguay 2)	Group stage	2019 Primera División aggregate table best team not yet qualified
Paraguay (4 berths)	Cerro Porteño (Paraguay 3)	Second stage	2019 Primera División aggregate table 2nd best team not yet qualified
Paraguay (4 berths)	Guaraní (Paraguay 4)	First stage	2019 Primera División aggregate table 3rd best team not yet qualified
Peru (4 berths)	Binacional (Peru 1)	Group stage	2019 Liga 1 champions
Peru (4 berths)	Alianza Lima (Peru 2)	Group stage	2019 Liga 1 runners-up
Peru (4 berths)	Sporting Cristal (Peru 3)	Second stage	2019 Liga 1 3rd place
Peru (4 berths)	Universitario (Peru 4)	First stage	2019 Liga 1 aggregate table best team not yet qualified
Uruguay (4 berths)	Nacional (Uruguay 1)	Group stage	2019 Primera División champions
Uruguay (4 berths)	Peñarol (Uruguay 2)	Group stage	2019 Primera División runners-up
Uruguay (4 berths)	Cerro Largo (Uruguay 3)	Second stage	2019 Primera División aggregate table best team not yet qualified
Uruguay (4 berths)	Progreso (Uruguay 4)	First stage	2019 Primera División aggregate table 2nd best team not yet qualified
Venezuela (4 berths)	Caracas (Venezuela 1)	Group stage	2019 Primera División champions
Venezuela (4 berths)	Estudiantes de Mérida (Venezuela 2)	Group stage	2019 Primera División runners-up
Venezuela (4 berths)	Deportivo Táchira (Venezuela 3)	Second stage	2019 Primera División aggregate table best team not yet qualified
Venezuela (4 berths)	Carabobo (Venezuela 4)	First stage	2019 Primera División aggregate table 2nd best team not yet qualified

== Schedule ==
The schedule of the competition was as follows.

On 12 March 2020, CONMEBOL announced that the tournament would be temporarily suspended after matchday 2 due to the COVID-19 pandemic, with matches on matchday 3, originally scheduled for 17–19 March 2020, postponed to a later date yet to be confirmed. On 18 March 2020, CONMEBOL announced that the tournament would be suspended until 5 May 2020. On 17 April 2020, CONMEBOL announced that the tournament would be suspended indefinitely, and no date had been set for its resumption. On 10 July 2020, CONMEBOL announced the new schedule for the remainder of the competition.

Stage	Draw date	First leg	Second leg
First stage	17 December 2019	21–22 January 2020	28–29 January 2020
Second stage	17 December 2019	4–6 February 2020	11–13 February 2020
Third stage	17 December 2019	18–20 February 2020	25–27 February 2020
Group stage	17 December 2019	Matchday 1: 3–5 March 2020; Matchday 2: 10–12 March 2020; Matchday 3: 15–17 September 2020 (originally 17–19 March 2020); Matchday 4: 22–24 September 2020 (originally 7–9 April 2020); Matchday 5: 29 September – 1 October 2020 (originally 21–23 April 2020); Matchday 6: 20–22 October 2020 (originally 5–7 May 2020)	
Round of 16	23 October 2020 (originally 13 May 2020)	24–26 November & 2 December 2020 (originally 21–23 July 2020)	1–3 & 9 December 2020 (originally 28–30 July 2020)
Quarter-finals	23 October 2020 (originally 13 May 2020)	8–10 & 16 December 2020 (originally 18–20 August 2020)	15–17 & 23 December 2020 (originally 25–27 August 2020)
Semi-finals	23 October 2020 (originally 13 May 2020)	5–7 January 2021 (originally 22–24 September 2020)	12–14 January 2021 (originally 29 September – 1 October 2020)
Final	23 October 2020 (originally 13 May 2020)	30 January 2021 (originally 21 November 2020) at Estádio do Maracanã, Rio de Janeiro	

== Draws ==
Location of teams of the 2020 Copa Libertadores.
Brown: Group A; Red: Group B; Orange: Group C;
Yellow: Group D; Green: Group E; Blue: Group F;
Purple: Group G; Pink: Group H; White: Play-off rounds.

The draw for the qualifying stages and group stage was held on 17 December 2019, 20:30 PYST (UTC−3), at the CONMEBOL Convention Centre in Luque, Paraguay.

Teams were seeded by their CONMEBOL ranking of the Copa Libertadores as of 15 December 2019 (shown in parentheses), taking into account the following three factors:

1. Performance in the last 10 years, taking into account Copa Libertadores results in the period 2010–2019
2. Historical coefficient, taking into account Copa Libertadores results in the period 1960–2009
3. Local tournament champion, with bonus points awarded to domestic league champions of the last 10 years

For the first stage, the six teams were drawn into three ties (E1–E3), with the teams from Pot 1 hosting the second leg.

First stage draw
Pot 1	Pot 2
(Ecuador) Barcelona (23); (Paraguay) Guaraní (34); (Peru) Universitario (43)	(Uruguay) Progreso (132); (Venezuela) Carabobo (147); (Bolivia) San José (70)

Notes

1. ^{BOL} The identity of the team Bolivia 4 was not known at the time of the draw, and was seeded in Pot 2.

For the second stage, the 16 teams were drawn into eight ties (C1–C8), with the teams from Pot 1 hosting the second leg. Teams from the same association could not be drawn into the same tie, excluding the three winners of the first stage, which were allocated to Pot 2 and whose identity was not known at the time of the draw, and could be drawn into the same tie with another team from the same association.

Second stage draw
Pot 1	Pot 2
(Paraguay) Cerro Porteño (11); (Brazil) Internacional (16); (Brazil) Corinthians (18); (Peru) Sporting Cristal (31); (Argentina) Atlético Tucumán (50); (Venezuela) Deportivo Táchira (51); (Colombia) Deportes Tolima (58); (Chile) Palestino (66)	(Colombia) Independiente Medellín (68); (Ecuador) Macará (170); (Uruguay) Cerro Largo (207); (Bolivia) The Strongest (28); Universidad de Chile (33); First stage winner E1; First stage winner E2; First stage winner E3

Notes

1. ^{BOL} The identity of the team Bolivia 3 was not known at the time of the draw, and was seeded in Pot 2.
2. ^{CHI} The identity of the team Chile 4 was not known at the time of the draw, and was seeded in Pot 2.

For the third stage, the eight winners of the second stage were allocated without any draw into the following four ties (G1–G4), with the team in each tie with the higher CONMEBOL ranking hosting the second leg. As their identity was not known at the time of the draw, they could be drawn into the same tie with another team from the same association.

- Second stage winner C1 vs. Second stage winner C8
- Second stage winner C2 vs. Second stage winner C7
- Second stage winner C3 vs. Second stage winner C6
- Second stage winner C4 vs. Second stage winner C5

For the group stage, the 32 teams were drawn into eight groups (Groups A–H) of four containing a team from each of the four pots. Teams from the same association could not be drawn into the same group, excluding the four winners of the third stage, which were allocated to Pot 4 and whose identity was not known at the time of the draw, and could be drawn into the same group with another team from the same association.

Group stage draw
Pot 1	Pot 2	Pot 3	Pot 4
(Brazil) Flamengo (8); (Argentina) River Plate (1); (Argentina) Boca Juniors (2); (Brazil) Grêmio (3); (Uruguay) Nacional (4); (Uruguay) Peñarol (5); (Brazil) Palmeiras (6); (Paraguay) Olimpia (10)	(Ecuador) Independiente del Valle (35); (Brazil) Santos (14); (Brazil) São Paulo (17); (Paraguay) Libertad (19); (Chile) Colo-Colo (21); (Bolivia) Bolívar (24); (Argentina) Racing (27); (Chile) Universidad Católica (29)	(Ecuador) LDU Quito (30); (Colombia) América de Cali (36); (Brazil) Athletico Paranaense (41); (Colombia) Junior (48); (Peru) Alianza Lima (54); (Venezuela) Caracas (72); (Ecuador) Delfín (82); (Argentina) Tigre (93)	(Venezuela) Estudiantes de Mérida (113); (Peru) Binacional (140); (Argentina) Defensa y Justicia (208); (Bolivia) Jorge Wilstermann (38); Third stage winner G1; Third stage winner G2; Third stage winner G3; Third stage winner G4

Notes

1. ^{TH} The defending Copa Libertadores champions were automatically seeded in Pot 1 and allocated to Group A.
2. ^{CS} The defending Copa Sudamericana champions were automatically seeded in Pot 2.
3. ^{BOL} The identity of the team Bolivia 2 was not known at the time of the draw, and was seeded in Pot 4.

The draw for the round of 16 was held on 23 October 2020, 12:00 PYT (UTC−3). For the round of 16, the 16 teams were drawn into eight ties (A–H) between a group winner (Pot 1) and a group runner-up (Pot 2), with the group winners hosting the second leg. Teams from the same association or the same group could be drawn into the same tie (Regulations Article 2.2.3.2).

== Qualifying stages ==
In the qualifying stages, each tie was played on a home-and-away two-legged basis. If tied on aggregate, the away goals rule was used. If still tied, extra time was not played, and a penalty shoot-out was used to determine the winner (Regulations Article 2.4.3). The qualifying stages were structured as follows:

- First stage (6 teams): The three winners of the first stage advanced to the second stage to join the 13 teams which were given byes to the second stage.
- Second stage (16 teams): The eight winners of the second stage advanced to the third stage.
- Third stage (8 teams): The four winners of the third stage advanced to the group stage to join the 28 direct entrants. The two best teams eliminated in the third stage entered the Copa Sudamericana second stage.

=== First stage ===
Team 1	Agg.	Team 2	1st leg	2nd leg
San José (Bolivia)	0–5	(Paraguay) Guaraní	0–1	0–4
Carabobo (Venezuela)	1–2	(Peru) Universitario	1–1	0–1
Progreso (Uruguay)	1–5	(Ecuador) Barcelona	0–2	1–3

=== Second stage ===
Team 1	Agg.	Team 2	1st leg	2nd leg
Universitario (Peru)	1–2	(Paraguay) Cerro Porteño	1–1	0–1
Cerro Largo (Uruguay)	2–6	(Chile) Palestino	1–1	1–5
Independiente Medellín (Colombia)	4–2	(Venezuela) Deportivo Táchira	4–0	0–2
Macará (Ecuador)	0–2	(Colombia) Deportes Tolima	0–1	0–1
Universidad de Chile	0–2	(Brazil) Internacional	0–0	0–2
The Strongest (Bolivia)	2–2 (5–6 p)	(Argentina) Atlético Tucumán	2–0	0–2
Guaraní (Paraguay)	2–2 (a)	(Brazil) Corinthians	1–0	1–2
Barcelona (Ecuador)	5–2	(Peru) Sporting Cristal	4–0	1–2

=== Third stage ===
Team 1	Agg.	Team 2	1st leg	2nd leg
Barcelona (Ecuador)	5–0	(Paraguay) Cerro Porteño	1–0	4–0
Palestino (Chile)	1–3	(Paraguay) Guaraní	0–1	1–2
Independiente Medellín (Colombia)	1–1 (4–2 p)	(Argentina) Atlético Tucumán	1–0	0–1
Deportes Tolima (Colombia)	0–1	(Brazil) Internacional	0–0	0–1

=== Copa Sudamericana qualification ===
The two best teams eliminated in the third stage entered the Copa Sudamericana second stage. Only matches in the third stage were considered for the ranking of teams.

Pos	Third stage losers	Pld	W	D	L	GF	GA	GD	Pts	Qualification
1	(Argentina) Atlético Tucumán	2	1	0	1	1	1	0	3	Copa Sudamericana
2	(Colombia) Deportes Tolima	2	0	1	1	0	1	−1	1	Copa Sudamericana
3	(Chile) Palestino	2	0	0	2	1	3	−2	0	
4	(Paraguay) Cerro Porteño	2	0	0	2	0	5	−5	0	

Source: CONMEBOL
Rules for classification: 1) Points; 2) Goal difference; 3) Goals scored; 4) Away goals scored; 5) CONMEBOL ranking (Regulations Article 2.2.1.6).

== Group stage ==
In the group stage, each group was played on a home-and-away round-robin basis. The teams were ranked according to the following criteria: 1. Points (3 points for a win, 1 point for a draw, and 0 points for a loss); 2. Goal difference; 3. Goals scored; 4. Away goals scored; 5. CONMEBOL ranking (Regulations Article 2.4.2).

The winners and runners-up of each group advanced to the round of 16 of the final stages. The third-placed teams of each group entered the Copa Sudamericana second stage.

=== Group A ===
Pos	Team	Pld	W	D	L	GF	GA	GD	Pts	Qualification	FLA	IDV	JUN	BSC
1	(Brazil) Flamengo	6	5	0	1	14	8	+6	15	Round of 16	—	4–0	3–1	3–0
2	(Ecuador) Independiente del Valle	6	4	0	2	14	8	+6	12	Round of 16	5–0	—	3–0	2–0
3	(Colombia) Junior	6	2	0	4	8	12	−4	6	Copa Sudamericana	1–2	4–1	—	0–2
4	(Ecuador) Barcelona	6	1	0	5	4	12	−8	3		1–2	0–3	1–2	—

Source: CONMEBOL

=== Group B ===
Pos	Team	Pld	W	D	L	GF	GA	GD	Pts	Qualification	PAL	GUA	BOL	TIG
1	(Brazil) Palmeiras	6	5	1	0	17	2	+15	16	Round of 16	—	3–1	5–0	5–0
2	(Paraguay) Guaraní	6	4	1	1	13	7	+6	13	Round of 16	0–0	—	2–0	4–1
3	(Bolivia) Bolívar	6	1	1	4	6	13	−7	4	Copa Sudamericana	1–2	2–3	—	2–0
4	(Argentina) Tigre	6	0	1	5	3	17	−14	1		0–2	1–3	1–1	—

Source: CONMEBOL

=== Group C ===
Pos	Team	Pld	W	D	L	GF	GA	GD	Pts	Qualification	WIL	CAP	PEÑ	CCL
1	(Bolivia) Jorge Wilstermann	6	3	1	2	8	5	+3	10	Round of 16	—	2–3	3–1	2–0
2	(Brazil) Athletico Paranaense	6	3	1	2	8	6	+2	10	Round of 16	0–0	—	1–0	2–0
3	(Uruguay) Peñarol	6	3	0	3	9	8	+1	9	Copa Sudamericana	1–0	3–2	—	3–0
4	(Chile) Colo-Colo	6	2	0	4	3	9	−6	6		0–1	1–0	2–1	—

Source: CONMEBOL

=== Group D ===
Pos	Team	Pld	W	D	L	GF	GA	GD	Pts	Qualification	RIV	LDQ	SPA	BIN
1	(Argentina) River Plate	6	4	1	1	21	6	+15	13	Round of 16	—	3–0	2–1	8–0
2	(Ecuador) LDU Quito	6	4	0	2	12	8	+4	12	Round of 16	3–0	—	4–2	4–0
3	(Brazil) São Paulo	6	2	1	3	14	11	+3	7	Copa Sudamericana	2–2	3–0	—	5–1
4	(Peru) Binacional	6	1	0	5	3	25	−22	3		0–6	0–1	2–1	—

Source: CONMEBOL

=== Group E ===
Pos	Team	Pld	W	D	L	GF	GA	GD	Pts	Qualification	GRE	INT	UCA	AME
1	(Brazil) Grêmio	6	3	2	1	6	3	+3	11	Round of 16	—	0–0	2–0	1–1
2	(Brazil) Internacional	6	2	2	2	8	6	+2	8	Round of 16	0–1	—	3–0	4–3
3	(Chile) Universidad Católica	6	2	1	3	6	9	−3	7	Copa Sudamericana	2–0	2–1	—	1–2
4	(Colombia) América de Cali	6	1	3	2	7	9	−2	6		0–2	0–0	1–1	—

Source: CONMEBOL

=== Group F ===
Pos	Team	Pld	W	D	L	GF	GA	GD	Pts	Qualification	NAC	RAC	ESM	ALI
1	(Uruguay) Nacional	6	5	0	1	9	3	+6	15	Round of 16	—	1–2	1–0	2–0
2	(Argentina) Racing	6	5	0	1	9	4	+5	15	Round of 16	0–1	—	2–1	1–0
3	(Venezuela) Estudiantes de Mérida	6	1	1	4	8	12	−4	4	Copa Sudamericana	1–3	1–2	—	3–2
4	(Peru) Alianza Lima	6	0	1	5	4	11	−7	1		0–1	0–2	2–2	—

Source: CONMEBOL

=== Group G ===
Pos	Team	Pld	W	D	L	GF	GA	GD	Pts	Qualification	SAN	DEL	DYJ	OLI
1	(Brazil) Santos	6	5	1	0	10	5	+5	16	Round of 16	—	1–0	2–1	0–0
2	(Ecuador) Delfín	6	2	1	3	6	7	−1	7	Round of 16	1–2	—	3–0	1–1
3	(Argentina) Defensa y Justicia	6	2	0	4	8	10	−2	6	Copa Sudamericana	1–2	3–0	—	2–1
4	(Paraguay) Olimpia	6	1	2	3	6	8	−2	5		2–3	0–1	2–1	—

Source: CONMEBOL

=== Group H ===
Pos	Team	Pld	W	D	L	GF	GA	GD	Pts	Qualification	BOC	LIB	CAR	DIM
1	(Argentina) Boca Juniors	6	4	2	0	10	1	+9	14	Round of 16	—	0–0	3–0	3–0
2	(Paraguay) Libertad	6	2	1	3	8	11	−3	7	Round of 16	0–2	—	3–2	2–4
3	(Venezuela) Caracas	6	2	1	3	8	12	−4	7	Copa Sudamericana	1–1	2–1	—	0–2
4	(Colombia) Independiente Medellín	6	2	0	4	9	11	−2	6		0–1	1–2	2–3	—

Source: CONMEBOL

== Final stages ==
Starting from the round of 16, the teams played a single-elimination tournament with the following rules:

- In the round of 16, quarter-finals and semi-finals, each tie was played on a home-and-away two-legged basis, with the higher-seeded team hosting the second leg (Regulations Article 2.2.3.2). If tied on aggregate, the away goals rule was used. If still tied, extra time was not played, and a penalty shoot-out was used to determine the winners (Regulations Article 2.4.3).
- The final was played as a single match at a venue pre-selected by the CONMEBOL, with the higher-seeded team designated as the "home" team for administrative purposes (Regulations Article 2.2.3.5). If tied after regulation, 30 minutes of extra time would be played. If still tied after extra time, a penalty shoot-out would be used to determine the winners (Regulations Article 2.4.4).

=== Qualified teams ===
The winners and runners-up of each of the eight groups in the group stage advanced to the round of 16.

Group	Winners	Runners-up
A	(Brazil) Flamengo	(Ecuador) Independiente del Valle
B	(Brazil) Palmeiras	(Paraguay) Guaraní
C	(Bolivia) Jorge Wilstermann	(Brazil) Athletico Paranaense
D	(Argentina) River Plate	(Ecuador) LDU Quito
E	(Brazil) Grêmio	(Brazil) Internacional
F	(Uruguay) Nacional	(Argentina) Racing
G	(Brazil) Santos	(Ecuador) Delfín
H	(Argentina) Boca Juniors	(Paraguay) Libertad

=== Seeding ===
Starting from the round of 16, the teams were seeded according to their results in the group stage, with the group winners (Pot 1) seeded 1–8, and the group runners-up (Pot 2) seeded 9–16.

Seed	Grp	Team	Pld	W	D	L	GF	GA	GD	Pts	Round of 16 draw
1	B	(Brazil) Palmeiras	6	5	1	0	17	2	+15	16	Pot 1
2	G	(Brazil) Santos	6	5	1	0	10	5	+5	16	Pot 1
3	A	(Brazil) Flamengo	6	5	0	1	14	8	+6	15	Pot 1
4	F	(Uruguay) Nacional	6	5	0	1	9	3	+6	15	Pot 1
5	H	(Argentina) Boca Juniors	6	4	2	0	10	1	+9	14	Pot 1
6	D	(Argentina) River Plate	6	4	1	1	21	6	+15	13	Pot 1
7	E	(Brazil) Grêmio	6	3	2	1	6	3	+3	11	Pot 1
8	C	(Bolivia) Jorge Wilstermann	6	3	1	2	8	5	+3	10	Pot 1
9	F	(Argentina) Racing	6	5	0	1	9	4	+5	15	Pot 2
10	B	(Paraguay) Guaraní	6	4	1	1	13	7	+6	13	Pot 2
11	A	(Ecuador) Independiente del Valle	6	4	0	2	14	8	+6	12	Pot 2
12	D	(Ecuador) LDU Quito	6	4	0	2	12	8	+4	12	Pot 2
13	C	(Brazil) Athletico Paranaense	6	3	1	2	8	6	+2	10	Pot 2
14	E	(Brazil) Internacional	6	2	2	2	8	6	+2	8	Pot 2
15	G	(Ecuador) Delfín	6	2	1	3	6	7	−1	7	Pot 2
16	H	(Paraguay) Libertad	6	2	1	3	8	11	−3	7	Pot 2

Source: CONMEBOL
Rules for classification: 1) Higher position in group; 2) Points; 3) Goal difference; 4) Goals scored; 5) Away goals scored; 6) CONMEBOL ranking (Regulations Article 22.i).

=== Bracket ===
The bracket was decided based on the round of 16 draw, which was held on 23 October 2020.

Round of 16
13	(Brazil) Athletico Paranaense	1	0	1
6	(Argentina) River Plate	1	1	2
11	(Ecuador) Independiente del Valle	0	0	0 (2)
4	(Uruguay) Nacional (p)	0	0	0 (4)
16	(Paraguay) Libertad	3	2	5
8	(Bolivia) Jorge Wilstermann	1	0	1
15	(Ecuador) Delfín	1	0	1
1	(Brazil) Palmeiras	3	5	8
9	(Argentina) Racing (p)	1	1	2 (5)
3	(Brazil) Flamengo	1	1	2 (3)
14	(Brazil) Internacional	0	1	1 (4)
5	(Argentina) Boca Juniors (p)	1	0	1 (5)
10	(Paraguay) Guaraní	0	0	0
7	(Brazil) Grêmio	2	2	4
12	(Ecuador) LDU Quito	1	1	2
2	(Brazil) Santos (a)	2	0	2

Quarter-finals
6	(Argentina) River Plate	2	6	8
4	(Uruguay) Nacional	0	2	2
16	(Paraguay) Libertad	1	0	1
1	(Brazil) Palmeiras	1	3	4
9	(Argentina) Racing	1	0	1
5	(Argentina) Boca Juniors	0	2	2
7	(Brazil) Grêmio	1	1	2
2	(Brazil) Santos	1	4	5

Semi-finals
6	(Argentina) River Plate	0	2	2
1	(Brazil) Palmeiras	3	0	3
5	(Argentina) Boca Juniors	0	0	0
2	(Brazil) Santos	0	3	3

Final
30 January 2021 – Rio de Janeiro
1	(Brazil) Palmeiras	1
2	(Brazil) Santos	0

=== Round of 16 ===
Team 1	Agg.	Team 2	1st leg	2nd leg
Guaraní (Paraguay)	0–4	(Brazil) Grêmio	0–2	0–2
Independiente del Valle (Ecuador)	0–0 (2–4 p)	(Uruguay) Nacional	0–0	0–0
Delfín (Ecuador)	1–8	(Brazil) Palmeiras	1–3	0–5
Internacional (Brazil)	1–1 (4–5 p)	(Argentina) Boca Juniors	0–1	1–0
Racing (Argentina)	2–2 (5–3 p)	(Brazil) Flamengo	1–1	1–1
Libertad (Paraguay)	5–1	(Bolivia) Jorge Wilstermann	3–1	2–0
Athletico Paranaense (Brazil)	1–2	(Argentina) River Plate	1–1	0–1
LDU Quito (Ecuador)	2–2 (a)	(Brazil) Santos	1–2	1–0

=== Quarter-finals ===
Team 1	Agg.	Team 2	1st leg	2nd leg
Grêmio (Brazil)	2–5	(Brazil) Santos	1–1	1–4
River Plate (Argentina)	8–2	(Uruguay) Nacional	2–0	6–2
Libertad (Paraguay)	1–4	(Brazil) Palmeiras	1–1	0–3
Racing (Argentina)	1–2	(Argentina) Boca Juniors	1–0	0–2

=== Semi-finals ===
Team 1	Agg.	Team 2	1st leg	2nd leg
Boca Juniors (Argentina)	0–3	(Brazil) Santos	0–0	0–3
River Plate (Argentina)	2–3	(Brazil) Palmeiras	0–3	2–0

=== Final ===
30 January 2021
17:00 UTC−3

Palmeiras (Brazil)	1–0	(Brazil) Santos
Breno Lopes 90+9'	Report

Estádio do Maracanã, Rio de Janeiro
Attendance: 5,000
Referee: Patricio Loustau (Argentina)

== Statistics ==
=== Top scorers ===
Rank	Player	Team	1Q1	1Q2	2Q1	2Q2	3Q1	3Q2	GS1	GS2	GS3	GS4	GS5	GS6	⅛F1	⅛F2	QF1	QF2	SF1	SF2	F	Total
1	(Ecuador) Fidel Martínez	(Ecuador) Barcelona	1	1	2	1	1	2														8
2	(Colombia) Rafael Santos Borré	(Argentina) River Plate								1	1			1				3		1		7
3	(Argentina) Eduardo Salvio	(Argentina) Boca Juniors								2	2	1						1				6
4	(Brazil) Luiz Adriano	(Brazil) Palmeiras							1	3									1			5
4	(Argentina) Julián Álvarez	(Argentina) River Plate									1	1	2	1								5
4	(Brazil) Kaio Jorge	(Brazil) Santos							1				1				1	2				5
4	(Brazil) Rony	(Brazil) Palmeiras											1	1	1			1	1			5
8	(Paraguay) Óscar Cardozo	(Paraguay) Libertad							1						1	2						4
8	(Brazil) Bruno Henrique	(Brazil) Flamengo								1			2	1								4
8	(Brazil) Marinho	(Brazil) Santos										1	1		1			1				4
8	(Colombia) Javier Reina	(Colombia) Independiente Medellín			2						1			1								4
8	(Venezuela) José Rivas	(Venezuela) Estudiantes de Mérida							1		1		2									4
8	(Panama) Gabriel Torres	(Ecuador) Independiente del Valle							1		1	1		1								4
8	(Brazil) Willian	(Brazil) Palmeiras							1		1		1	1		1						4
8	(Argentina) Fernando Zampedri	(Chile) Universidad Católica									1	1		2								4

Source: CONMEBOL.com

=== Team of the tournament ===
The CONMEBOL technical study group; conformed by Nery Pumpido, Gerardo Pelusso, Diego Gavilán, Faryd Mondragón, Francisco Maturana, Dorival Júnior, Daniel Bañales and César Sampaio, selected the following 11 players as the team of the tournament. All players belong to one of the 4 semi-finalist teams.

Position	Player	Team
Goalkeeper	(Brazil) Weverton	(Brazil) Palmeiras
Defenders	(Argentina) Gonzalo Montiel	(Argentina) River Plate
Defenders	(Brazil) Lucas Veríssimo	(Brazil) Santos
Defenders	(Paraguay) Gustavo Gómez	(Brazil) Palmeiras
Defenders	(Uruguay) Matías Viña	(Brazil) Palmeiras
Midfielders	(Brazil) Gabriel Menino	(Brazil) Palmeiras
Midfielders	(Argentina) Enzo Pérez	(Argentina) River Plate
Midfielders	(Venezuela) Yeferson Soteldo	(Brazil) Santos
Forwards	(Brazil) Marinho	(Brazil) Santos
Forwards	(Colombia) Rafael Santos Borré	(Argentina) River Plate
Forwards	(Argentina) Carlos Tevez	(Argentina) Boca Juniors

== See also ==
- 2020 Copa Sudamericana
- 2021 Recopa Sudamericana
