= Enzo Borges =

Uruguayan footballer (born 1986)

Personal information
- Full name: Enzo Araciel Borges Couto
- Date of birth: 22 July 1986 (age 40)
- Place of birth: Rivera, Uruguay
- Height: 1.79 m (5 ft 10 in)
- Position: Striker

Team information
- Current team: Cerro Largo

Youth career
- –2007: Wanderers

Senior career*
Years	Team	Apps	(Gls)
2007	Wanderers		
2007–2008	Cerrito		
2010	14 de Julho		
- Bagé
- Rio Grande
2011	14 de Julho		
- Sarandí Universitario
2013–2014	Cerro Largo	40	(6)
2015	Comerciantes Unidos	22	(12)
2016	La Bocana	39	(19)
2017	Juan Aurich	38	(11)
2018	Nacional Potosí	1	(0)
2018	Coopsol	22	(12)
2019	Comerciantes Unidos	22	(13)
2020–2021	Cerro Largo	27	(11)
2021	River Plate (PAR)	9	(0)
2022–	Deportivo Maldonado	17	(7)
- * Club domestic league appearances and goals

Enzo Silva Borges dos Santos (born 22 July 1986) is a Uruguayan footballer who plays as a striker for Deportivo Maldonado.

== Career ==
Borges started his career with Uruguayan top flight side Wanderers. After that, he played for 14 de Julho, Bagé, and Rio Grande in the Brazilian lower leagues.

Before the second half of 2012/13, Borges signed for Uruguayan top flight club Cerro Largo after playing for Sarandí Universitario in the Uruguayan lower leagues.

Before the 2016 season, he signed for Peruvian top flight team La Bocana.

Before the 2018 season, Borges signed for Nacional Potosí in Bolivia, where he suffered from the altitude.

In 2018, he signed for Peruvian second division outfit Coopsol.

Before the 2020 season, Borges returned to Cerro Largo.
