= Carlos Rolón (footballer) =

Paraguayan footballer (born 1992)

Personal information
- Full name: Carlos Adalberto Rolón Ibarra
- Date of birth: 30 June 1992 (age 34)
- Place of birth: Paraguarí, Paraguay
- Height: 1.84 m (6 ft 0 in)
- Position: Centre-back

Team information
- Current team: Aucas
- Number: 16

Youth career
- 2005–2010: Olimpia

Senior career*
Years	Team	Apps	(Gls)
2010–2011	Olimpia	4	(0)
2012	Sportivo Carapeguá	22	(1)
2013	San Antonio Unido	33	(4)
2014	Olimpia	19	(3)
2014	Sportivo Luqueño	15	(1)
2015–2016	Olimpia	56	(3)
2016–2017	Guarani	19	(5)
2017–2021	Olimpia	52	(3)
2021–2022	Cerro Porteño	20	(3)
2023	Nacional	20	(0)
2023–	Aucas	56	(3)

International career
2017	Paraguay	1	(0)
- * Club domestic league appearances and goals as of 20 August 2025

Carlos Adalberto Rolón Ibarra (born 30 June 1992) is a Paraguayan footballer who plays for Ecuadorian club Aucas and the Paraguay national football team.

He is the nephew of the well-known former football player and current Paraguayan coach Francisco Arce.

== International career ==
Rolón played once for Paraguay national team. He played the World Cup qualifying match against Chile.
