= Larry Angulo =

Colombian footballer (born 1995)

Personal information
- Full name: Larry Johan Angulo Riascos
- Date of birth: 10 August 1995 (age 31)
- Place of birth: Cali, Colombia
- Height: 1.88 m (6 ft 2 in)
- Position: Midfielder

Team information
- Current team: Hapoel Haifa

Senior career*
Years	Team	Apps	(Gls)
2017–2018	Patriotas	13	(1)
2018–2022	Independiente Medellín	41	(2)
2021	La Equidad	16	(2)
2021–2022	América de Cali	24	(6)
2023	Deportivo Pereira	13	(1)
2024	Always Ready	1	(0)
2024–2025	Alajuelense	41	(2)
2025–	Hapoel Haifa	0	(0)
- * Club domestic league appearances and goals as of 1 June 2025 (UTC)

Larry Johan Angulo Riascos (born 10 August 1995) is a Colombian professional footballer who plays as a midfielder.

== Club career ==
=== Hapoel Haifa ===
On summer 2025 signed for the Israeli Premier League club Hapoel Haifa.
