= José Alejandro Rivas =

Venezuelan footballer (born 1998)

Personal information
- Full name: José Alejandro Rivas Gamboa
- Date of birth: 13 September 1998 (age 28)
- Place of birth: Valera, Venezuela
- Height: 1.77 m (5 ft 10 in)
- Position: Forward

Team information
- Current team: Academia Puerto Cabello

Senior career*
Years	Team	Apps	(Gls)
2015–2019	Trujillanos	63	(14)
2020–2021	Estudiantes de Merida	19	(9)
2021	Volos	0	(0)
2021–2024	Academia Puerto Cabello	20	(2)
- * Club domestic league appearances and goals as of 19:05, 1 February 2021 (UTC)

José Alejandro Rivas Gamboa (born 13 September 1998) is a Venezuelan footballer who plays as a striker for Portuguesa Fútbol Club of the Venezuelan Primera División.

== Career statistics ==
=== Club ===
As of 11 January 2020.

Club	Season	League			Cup		Continental		Other		Total	
Club	Season	Division	Apps	Goals	Apps	Goals	Apps	Goals	Apps	Goals	Apps	Goals
Trujillanos	2015	Venezuelan Primera División	9	1	2 (Note: Appearances in the Copa Venezuela)	0	0	0	0	0	11	1
Trujillanos	2016	Venezuelan Primera División	5	0	0	0	0	0	0	0	5	0
Trujillanos	2017	Venezuelan Primera División	6	0	1	0	0	0	0	0	7	0
Trujillanos	2018	Venezuelan Primera División	12	2	0	0	0	0	0	0	12	2
Trujillanos	2019	Venezuelan Primera División	31	11	0	0	0	0	0	0	31	11
Career total			63	14	3	0	0	0	0	0	66	14
