= Leodán González =

Uruguayan football referee (born 1983)

- Full name: Leodán Frank González Cabrera
- Born: 28 March 1983 (age 43); Uruguay
- Other occupation: Sports official

Domestic
Years	League	Role
2011–	Uruguayan Primera División	Referee

International
Years	League	Role
2016–	FIFA listed	Referee
2022–	FIFA World Cup	Video Assistant Referee (VAR)

Leodán Frank González Cabrera (born March 28, 1983) is a Uruguayan football referee who has officiated at domestic, continental, and international levels. He is recognized by FIFA as an international referee and has officiated major competitions in South America.

== Domestic Competitions ==
Leodán González has been officiating matches in the Uruguayan Primera División since 2011. In 2017, he was appointed to referee the play-off final for the Uruguayan Championship between Defensor Sporting and Nacional Montevideo, in which Nacional claimed the title with a 1–0 victory. In 2021, González refereed the Uruguayan Super Cup final, where Nacional triumphed again, defeating the Montevideo Wanderers 2–0.

== International career ==
Since 2016, González has been listed as a FIFA international referee, authorizing him to officiate international fixtures. He made his international debut in April 2016 during a friendly match between the Uruguay U-20 and Paraguay U-20 teams.

A key moment in his international career came in 2020, when he officiated the Copa Libertadores semi-final first leg between River Plate and Palmeiras.

On the intercontinental stage, González officiated at the 2019 FIFA U-20 World Cup in Poland, where he took charge of three matches. He was initially selected as a referee for the 2020 FIFA Club World Cup but was replaced by his compatriot Esteban Ostojich after falling ill shortly before the tournament.

In 2021, González was part of the refereeing team at the Tokyo Olympics, where he officiated two group stage matches, including the decisive fixture between Germany and Ivory Coast.

For the 2022 FIFA World Cup in Qatar, González was appointed as a Video Assistant Referee (VAR). He had previously served in the same role at the 2019 Copa América.
