= Fernando Rapallini =

Argentine football referee (born 1978)

- Full name: Fernando Andrés Rapallini
- Born: 28 April 1978 (age 48); La Plata, Argentina

Domestic
Years	League	Role
2006–	Primera B Nacional	Referee
2011–	Primera División	Referee

International
Years	League	Role
2014–2023	FIFA listed	Referee

Fernando Andrés Rapallini (born 28 April 1978) is an Argentine football referee who officiates in the Argentine Primera División. He has been a FIFA referee since 2014.

== Refereeing career ==
In 2011, Rapallini began officiating in the Argentine Primera División. His first match as referee was on 19 June 2011 between Godoy Cruz and All Boys. In 2014, he was put on the FIFA referees list. He officiated his first senior international match on 5 June 2015 between Chile and El Salvador.

Rapallini has officiated numerous finals in Argentina, including the 2013 Supercopa Argentina, 2017 Copa Argentina Final, 2018 Supercopa Argentina and 2019 Trofeo de Campeones de la Superliga Argentina. He was selected by CONMEBOL as the fourth official for the second leg of the 2015 Recopa Sudamericana between Argentine clubs San Lorenzo and River Plate, and officiated the second leg of the 2020 Recopa Sudamericana between Brazilian club Flamengo and Ecuadorian club Independiente del Valle. He also worked as one of the assistant video assistant referees for the 2020 Copa Libertadores Final between Brazilian clubs Palmeiras and Santos.

Rapallini was selected as a match official for the 2015 South American U-17 Championship in Paraguay, as well as the 2017 South American U-17 Championship and 2019 South American U-20 Championship, both in Chile. In March 2019, he was selected a referee for both the 2019 FIFA U-20 World Cup in Poland and the 2019 Copa América in Brazil.

As part of a referee exchange programme between CONMEBOL and UEFA, Rapallini was selected on 21 April 2021 as a referee for UEFA Euro 2020, to be held across Europe in June and July 2021. This marked the first time a South American referee had been selected to officiate at the UEFA European Championship. At the group stage he was the referee of the Ukraine-North Macedonia game (17 June 2021) at the National Arena in Bucharest, and of the Croatia-Scotland clash (22 June 2021) at Glasgow's Hampden Park, as well as the 1/16 game France-Switzerland (28 June 2021) at the National Arena in Bucharest.

Rapallini was selected to be a referee at the 2022 FIFA World Cup, where he officiated three matches.
