= Javier Reina =

Colombian footballer (born 1989)

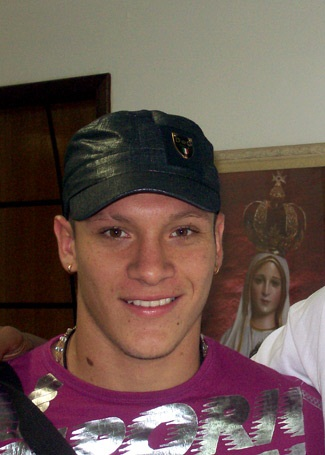

Personal information
- Full name: Javier Arley Reina Calvo
- Date of birth: 4 January 1989 (age 37)
- Place of birth: Cali, Colombia
- Height: 1.73 m (5 ft 8 in)
- Position: Attacking midfielder

Team information
- Current team: Deportes Quindío
- Number: 10

Youth career
- América de Cali

Senior career*
Years	Team	Apps	(Gls)
2005–2008	América de Cali	33	(2)
2008–2011	Cruzeiro	2	(0)
2009	→ Vitória (loan)	10	(0)
2009–2010	→ Ipatinga (loan)	11	(1)
2010	→ Ceará (loan)	10	(0)
2011	→ Jeonnam Dragons (loan)	20	(3)
2012	Ceará	4	(0)
2012–2013	Seongnam FC	20	(5)
2013–2014	Olimpo	12	(0)
2014–2015	Millonarios	21	(2)
2015	Seongnam FC	15	(1)
2016	→ Colo-Colo (loan)	13	(0)
2017	Deportivo Pasto	27	(5)
2018	Ceará	10	(0)
2019	Once Caldas	22	(3)
2020–2021	Independiente Medellín	45	(7)
2022	Operário-PR	27	(4)
2023	Atlético Bucaramanga	34	(1)
2024–2026	Deportivo Cali	58	(5)
2026–	Deportes Quindío	2	(0)

International career
2009	Colombia U20	8	(0)
- * Club domestic league appearances and goals as of 13 March 2026

Javier Arley Reina Calvo (Spanish pronunciation: [xaˈβjeɾ ˈrejna]; born 4 January 1989) is a Colombian footballer who plays for Categoría Primera B club Deportes Quindío.

== Club career ==
He began his football career at América de Cali, making his professional debut in 2005. There, he accumulated two goals in 33 appearances in all his spell at Cali-based team.

In April 2008, Reina headed to Brazil for Cruzeiro and in August 2008, joined the Série B side Ipatinga on loan. In the summer break of the 2010 Série A campaign, he signed a season-long loan deal with Ceará Sporting Club.

On 17 January 2011, Reina joined the South Korean club Chunnam Dragons on loan for 1 year. He scored 3 goals in 20 matches during his time with the club. After a loan spell in Korea, he moved to Ceará again on a permanent deal. On 4 July 2012, Reina returned to South Korea, signing a contract with Seongnam Ilhwa Chunma.

After a brief spell at Argentina's Club Olimpo during the 2013-14 season, in mid 2014 he joined Colombian powerhouse Millonarios. In July 2015, he returned to South Korea and his former club Seongnam FC, where he scored one goal in fifteen 2015 K League Classic matches.

On 9 January 2016, it was confirmed that Reina joined Chilean club Colo-Colo on loan, the country's most successful club.

In 2017, he joined Deportivo Pasto of the Categoría Primera A. He played both the Apertura and the Finalizacion tournaments of the 2017 Categoría Primera A season. He had another brief period at Ceara in 2018, before moving back to Colombia with Once Caldas in 2019.

== Internacional career ==
Reina appeared with Colombia's U20 in the 2007 South American Youth Championship, appearing seven times in the contest.
