= 2020 Copa Sudamericana final =

- Event: 2020 Copa Sudamericana
Lanús	Defensa y Justicia
(Argentina)	(Argentina)
0	3
- Date: 23 January 2021
- Venue: Estadio Mario Alberto Kempes, Córdoba
- Man of the Match: Braian Romero (Defensa y Justicia)
- Referee: Jesús Valenzuela (Venezuela)
- Attendance: 0

The 2020 Copa Sudamericana final was the final match which decided the winner of the 2020 Copa Sudamericana, the 19th edition of the Copa Sudamericana, South America's secondary international club football tournament organized by CONMEBOL.

The match was played on 23 January 2021 at the Estadio Mario Alberto Kempes in Córdoba, Argentina, between Argentine teams Lanús and Defensa y Justicia. It was held behind closed doors due to the COVID-19 pandemic in South America.

The final was originally scheduled to be played on 7 November 2020. However, as the tournament had been interrupted since March 2020 due to the COVID-19 pandemic, CONMEBOL announced on 10 July 2020 that it would be rescheduled to be played in late January 2021, with 23, 24 or 30 January being the possible dates. Eventually, on 9 November 2020, CONMEBOL determined that the final would be played on 23 January 2021.

Defensa y Justicia defeated Lanús by a 3–0 score to win their first Copa Sudamericana title. This victory also meant the first title in the history of the team. As champions, Defensa y Justicia earned the right to play against the winners of the 2020 Copa Libertadores in the 2021 Recopa Sudamericana. They also automatically qualified for the 2021 Copa Libertadores group stage.

This was the first time both Copa Sudamericana finalists represented the same country. As of 2025, this is the only all-Argentine Copa Sudamericana final and the only time Copa Sudamericana was awarded in a derby (as both clubs represent the province of Buenos Aires).

== Venue ==
Since 2019, the Copa Sudamericana final is played as a single match at a venue chosen in advance. CONMEBOL announced on 15 October 2019 that the following four venues were candidates for the 2020 final:

On 17 October 2019, CONMEBOL announced that Estadio Mario Alberto Kempes, Córdoba was chosen as the 2020 final venue.

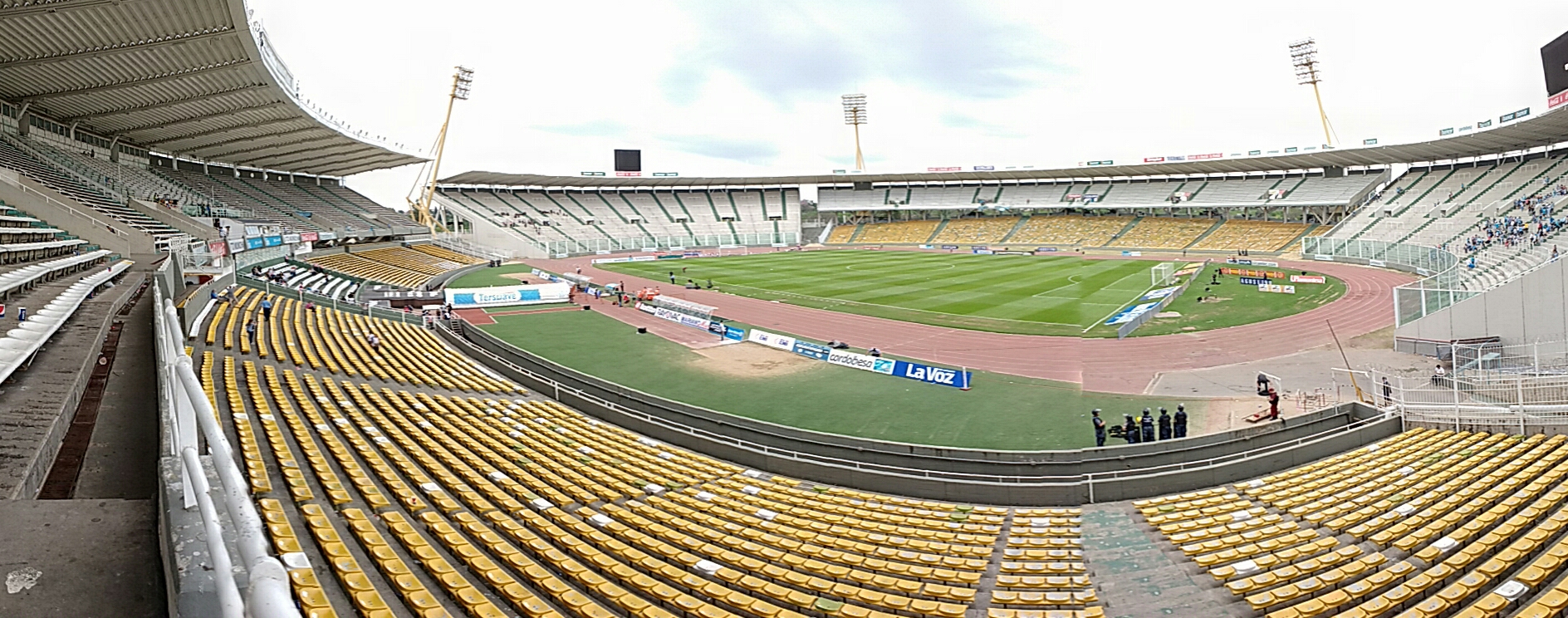
Estadio Mario Alberto Kempes in Córdoba, Argentina, hosted the final

Association	Stadium	City	Capacity
Argentina	Estadio Mario Alberto Kempes	Córdoba	57,000
Argentina	Estadio Ciudad de La Plata	La Plata	53,000
Brazil	Estádio Nacional Mané Garrincha	Brasília	72,788
Peru	Estadio Nacional	Lima	50,000

== Teams ==
Team	Previous finals appearances (bold indicates winners)
(Argentina) Lanús	1 (**2013**)
(Argentina) Defensa y Justicia	None

== Road to the final ==
Note: In all scores below, the score of the finalist is given first.

(Argentina) Lanús			Round	(Argentina) Defensa y Justicia		
Copa Sudamericana				Copa Libertadores		
Qualified for Copa Sudamericana			First stage	Bye		
Qualified for Copa Sudamericana			Second stage	Bye		
Qualified for Copa Sudamericana			Third stage	Bye		
Qualified for Copa Sudamericana			Group stage	**Group G**		
Qualified for Copa Sudamericana			Matchday 1	(Brazil) Santos	Home	1–2
Qualified for Copa Sudamericana			Matchday 2	(Paraguay) Olimpia	Away	1–2
Qualified for Copa Sudamericana			Matchday 3	(Ecuador) Delfín	Home	3–0
Qualified for Copa Sudamericana			Matchday 4	(Paraguay) Olimpia	Home	2–1
Qualified for Copa Sudamericana			Matchday 5	(Ecuador) Delfín	Away	0–3
Qualified for Copa Sudamericana			Matchday 6	(Brazil) Santos	Away	1–2
Qualified for Copa Sudamericana			Final standings	Pos / Team / Pld / Pts; 1 / (Brazil) Santos / 6 / **16**; 2 / (Ecuador) Delfín / 6 / **7**; **3** / (Argentina) Defensa y Justicia / **6** / **6**; 4 / (Paraguay) Olimpia / 6 / **5**; Source: CONMEBOL		
Opponent	Venue	Score	**Elimination**	Opponent	Venue	Score
(Ecuador) Universidad Católica (won 3–2 on aggregate)	Home	3–0	First stage	Bye		
(Ecuador) Universidad Católica (won 3–2 on aggregate)	Away	0–2	First stage	Bye		
(Brazil) São Paulo (tied 6–6 on aggregate, won on away goals)	Home	3–2	Second stage	(Paraguay) Sportivo Luqueño (won 3–2 on aggregate)	Away	2–1
(Brazil) São Paulo (tied 6–6 on aggregate, won on away goals)	Away	3–4	Second stage	(Paraguay) Sportivo Luqueño (won 3–2 on aggregate)	Home	1–1
**Seed 8**			Final stages	**Seed 10**		
(Bolivia) Bolívar (won 7–4 on aggregate)	Away	1–2	Round of 16	(Brazil) Vasco da Gama (won 2–1 on aggregate)	Home	1–1
(Bolivia) Bolívar (won 7–4 on aggregate)	Home	6–2	Round of 16	(Brazil) Vasco da Gama (won 2–1 on aggregate)	Away	1–0
(Argentina) Independiente (won 3–1 on aggregate)	Home	0–0	Quarter-finals	(Brazil) Bahia (won 4–2 on aggregate)	Away	3–2
(Argentina) Independiente (won 3–1 on aggregate)	Away	3–1	Quarter-finals	(Brazil) Bahia (won 4–2 on aggregate)	Home	1–0
(Argentina) Vélez Sarsfield (won 4–0 on aggregate)	Away	1–0	Semi-finals	(Chile) Coquimbo Unido (won 4–2 on aggregate)	Away	0–0
(Argentina) Vélez Sarsfield (won 4–0 on aggregate)	Home	3–0	Semi-finals	(Chile) Coquimbo Unido (won 4–2 on aggregate)	Home	4–2

== Match ==
23 January 2021
17:00 UTC−3

Lanús (Argentina)	0–3	(Argentina) Defensa y Justicia
	Report	Frías 34'; Romero 62'; Camacho 90+2'

Estadio Mario Alberto Kempes, Córdoba
Attendance: 0
Referee: Jesús Valenzuela (Venezuela) (Note: Referee Leodán González from Uruguay, who was originally assigned to the final match, was replaced by Jesús Valenzuela from Venezuela.)

**Lanús**	**Defensa y Justicia**

GK	17	(Argentina) Lautaro Morales
RB	35	(Argentina) Braian Aguirre
CB	3	(Argentina) Guillermo Burdisso	(yellow card) 80'
CB	6	(Colombia) Alexis Pérez	(yellow card) 72'
LB	25	(Argentina) Alexandro Bernabei	(yellow card) 48'	(substituted off) 81'
RM	8	(Argentina) Pedro De la Vega		(substituted off) 59'
CM	13	(Argentina) Tomás Belmonte
CM	19	(Argentina) Facundo Quignon		(substituted off) 69'
LM	14	(Argentina) Lucas Vera		(substituted off) 69'
RF	27	(Argentina) Nicolás Orsini
LF	9	(Argentina) José Sand (c)
Substitutes:
GK	1	(Argentina) Lucas Acosta
DF	22	(Argentina) Matías Pérez
DF	23	(Argentina) Julián Aude
DF	24	(Argentina) Nicolás Morgantini
DF	29	(Argentina) Nicolás Thaller
DF	39	(Argentina) Pablo Aranda
MF	5	(Argentina) Fernando Belluschi	(yellow card) 69'	(substituted on) 69'
MF	10	(Argentina) Gastón Lodico
MF	16	(Argentina) Facundo Pérez		(substituted on) 69'
MF	20	(Argentina) Matías Esquivel
FW	11	(Argentina) Franco Orozco		(substituted on) 59'
FW	41	(Argentina) Lucas Besozzi		(substituted on) 81'
Manager:
(Argentina) Luis Zubeldía

GK	22	(Argentina) Ezequiel Unsain (c)
CB	2	(Argentina) Adonis Frías		(substituted off) 75'
CB	21	(Argentina) David Martínez
CB	18	(Argentina) Rafael Delgado
DM	34	(Argentina) Enzo Fernández	(yellow card) 77'
RM	33	(Argentina) Franco Paredes
CM	29	(Argentina) Francisco Pizzini
CM	35	(Argentina) Valentín Larralde		(substituted off) 84'
LM	23	(Argentina) Eugenio Isnaldo
RF	20	(Argentina) Walter Bou		(substituted off) 61'
LF	31	(Argentina) Braian Romero	(yellow card) 63'	(substituted off) 76'
Substitutes:
GK	1	(Argentina) Marcos Ledesma
DF	3	(Argentina) Marcelo Benítez		(substituted on) 84'
DF	6	(Argentina) Nahuel Gallardo
DF	25	(Argentina) Néstor Breitenbruch
DF	37	(Argentina) Emanuel Brítez		(substituted on) 76'
MF	5	(Argentina) Nelson Acevedo
MF	11	(Uruguay) Washington Camacho		(substituted on) 75'
FW	9	(Uruguay) Miguel Merentiel		(substituted on) 61'
FW	12	(Argentina) Ciro Rius
FW	15	(Argentina) Nicolás Leguizamón
FW	19	(Argentina) Gabriel Hachen
FW	27	(Argentina) Enzo Coacci
Manager:
(Argentina) Hernán Crespo

Man of the Match:
Braian Romero (Defensa y Justicia)

Assistant referees:
Nicolás Tarán (Uruguay)
Richard Trinidad (Uruguay)
Fourth official:
Andrés Matonte (Uruguay)
Fifth official:
Jorge Urrego (Venezuela)
Video assistant referee:
Julio Bascuñán (Chile)
Assistant video assistant referees:
Ángelo Hermosilla (Chile)
Raúl Orellana (Chile)
Víctor Carrillo (Peru)

**Match rules**

- 90 minutes.
- 30 minutes of extra time if necessary.
- Penalty shoot-out if scores still level.
- Twelve named substitutes.
- Maximum of five substitutions.

== See also ==
- 2020 Copa Libertadores final
- 2021 Recopa Sudamericana
