= 2020 Copa Sudamericana first stage =

The 2020 Copa Sudamericana first stage was played from 4 to 27 February 2020. A total of 44 teams competed in the first stage to decide 22 of the 32 places in the second stage of the 2020 Copa Sudamericana.

== Draw ==
The draw for the first stage was held on 17 December 2019, 20:30 PYST (UTC−3), at the CONMEBOL Convention Centre in Luque, Paraguay. For the first stage, the teams were divided into two pots according to their geographical zones:

- Pot A (South Zone): 22 teams from Argentina, Bolivia, Chile, Paraguay, and Uruguay
- Pot B (North Zone): 22 teams from Brazil, Colombia, Ecuador, Peru, and Venezuela

The 44 teams were drawn into 22 ties (E1–E22) between a team from Pot A and a team from Pot B, with the teams from Pot B hosting the second leg in odd-numbered ties, and the teams from Pot A hosting the second leg in even-numbered ties. This distribution ensured that teams from the same association could not be drawn into the same tie.

First stage draw
Pot A (South Zone)	Pot B (North Zone)
(Argentina) Argentinos Juniors; (Argentina) Vélez Sarsfield; (Argentina) Independiente; (Argentina) Unión; (Argentina) Huracán; (Argentina) Lanús; (Bolivia) Nacional Potosí; (Bolivia) Blooming; (Bolivia) Always Ready; (Bolivia) Oriente Petrolero; (Chile) Unión La Calera; (Chile) Coquimbo Unido; (Chile) Huachipato; (Chile) Audax Italiano; (Paraguay) Sol de América; (Paraguay) Nacional; (Paraguay) River Plate; (Paraguay) Sportivo Luqueño; (Uruguay) Liverpool; (Uruguay) Plaza Colonia; (Uruguay) River Plate; (Uruguay) Fénix	(Brazil) Fortaleza; (Brazil) Goiás; (Brazil) Bahia; (Brazil) Vasco da Gama; (Brazil) Atlético Mineiro; (Brazil) Fluminense; (Colombia) Deportivo Cali; (Colombia) Atlético Nacional; (Colombia) Millonarios; (Colombia) Deportivo Pasto; (Ecuador) Universidad Católica; (Ecuador) Aucas; (Ecuador) Emelec; (Ecuador) El Nacional; (Peru) Sport Huancayo; (Peru) Melgar; (Peru) Cusco; (Peru) Atlético Grau; (Venezuela) Zamora; (Venezuela) Mineros de Guayana; (Venezuela) Llaneros; (Venezuela) Aragua

Notes

1. ^{BOL} The identity of the teams Bolivia 1, Bolivia 2, Bolivia 3 and Bolivia 4 was not known at the time of the draw.

== Format ==
In the first stage, each tie was played on a home-and-away two-legged basis. If tied on aggregate, the away goals rule was used. If still tied, extra time was not played, and a penalty shoot-out was used to determine the winner (Regulations Article 2.4.2).

The 22 winners of the first stage advanced to the second stage to join the 10 teams transferred from the Copa Libertadores (two best teams eliminated in the third stage of qualifying and eight third-placed teams in the group stage).

== Matches ==
The first legs were played on 4–6 and 11–13 February, and the second legs were played on 18–20 and 25–27 February 2020.

Team 1	Agg.	Team 2	1st leg	2nd leg
Coquimbo Unido (Chile)	3–1	(Venezuela) Aragua	3–0	0–1
Vasco da Gama (Brazil)	1–0	(Bolivia) Oriente Petrolero	1–0	0–0
Blooming (Bolivia)	0–5	(Ecuador) Emelec	0–3	0–2
Zamora (Venezuela)	1–3	(Uruguay) Plaza Colonia	1–0	0–3
Nacional Potosí (Bolivia)	2–2 (3–4 p)	(Peru) Melgar	0–2	2–0
Atlético Grau (Peru)	1–3	(Uruguay) River Plate	1–2	0–1
Unión (Argentina)	3–2	(Brazil) Atlético Mineiro	3–0	0–2
Bahia (Brazil)	6–1	(Paraguay) Nacional	3–0	3–1
Fénix (Uruguay)	3–2	(Ecuador) El Nacional	1–0	2–2
Atlético Nacional (Colombia)	4–1	(Argentina) Huracán	3–0	1–1
Sol de América (Paraguay)	2–0	(Brazil) Goiás	1–0	1–0
Mineros de Guayana (Venezuela)	4–5	(Paraguay) Sportivo Luqueño	2–3	2–2
Vélez Sarsfield (Argentina)	2–2 (a)	(Ecuador) Aucas	1–0	1–2
Millonarios (Colombia)	2–1	(Bolivia) Always Ready	2–0	0–1
Lanús (Argentina)	3–2	(Ecuador) Universidad Católica	3–0	0–2
Deportivo Cali (Colombia)	5–2	(Paraguay) River Plate	2–1	3–1
Argentinos Juniors (Argentina)	1–1 (a)	(Peru) Sport Huancayo	1–1	0–0
Fluminense (Brazil)	1–1 (a)	(Chile) Unión La Calera	1–1	0–0
Huachipato (Chile)	2–0	(Colombia) Deportivo Pasto	1–0	1–0
Cusco (Peru)	2–3	(Chile) Audax Italiano	2–0	0–3
Independiente (Argentina)	2–2 (a)	(Brazil) Fortaleza	1–0	1–2
Llaneros (Venezuela)	0–7	(Uruguay) Liverpool	0–2	0–5

=== Match E1 ===
4 February 2020
19:15 UTC−3

Coquimbo Unido (Chile)	3–0	(Venezuela) Aragua
Pereyra 67'; González 70'; Farfán 80'	Report

Estadio Municipal Francisco Sánchez Rumoroso, Coquimbo
Attendance: 7,091
Referee: José Méndez (Paraguay)

18 February 2020
18:15 UTC−4

Aragua (Venezuela)	1–0	(Chile) Coquimbo Unido
Fernández 13'	Report

Estadio Olímpico de la UCV, Caracas (Note: Aragua played their home match at Estadio Olímpico de la UCV, Caracas, instead of their regular stadium Estadio Olímpico Hermanos Ghersi Páez, Maracay, which does not meet CONMEBOL requirements.)
Referee: Ivo Méndez (Bolivia)

Coquimbo Unido won 3–1 on aggregate and advanced to the second stage.

=== Match E2 ===
5 February 2020
21:30 UTC−3

Vasco da Gama (Brazil)	1–0	(Bolivia) Oriente Petrolero
Cano 20'	Report

Estádio São Januário, Rio de Janeiro
Attendance: 18,105
Referee: Augusto Aragón (Ecuador)

19 February 2020
20:30 UTC−4

Oriente Petrolero (Bolivia)	0–0	(Brazil) Vasco da Gama
	Report

Estadio Ramón Tahuichi Aguilera, Santa Cruz de la Sierra
Referee: José Argote (Venezuela)

Vasco da Gama won 1–0 on aggregate and advanced to the second stage.

=== Match E3 ===
6 February 2020
18:15 UTC−4

Blooming (Bolivia)	0–3	(Ecuador) Emelec
	Report	Barceló 28', 90+4'; Arroyo 87'

Estadio Ramón Tahuichi Aguilera, Santa Cruz de la Sierra
Referee: Darío Herrera (Argentina)

20 February 2020
17:15 UTC−5 (Note: The Emelec v Blooming match was originally scheduled for 20 February 2020, 19:30 local time, but was re-scheduled to 17:15 local time.)

Emelec (Ecuador)	2–0	(Bolivia) Blooming
Cevallos 27'; Burbano 57'	Report

Estadio George Capwell, Guayaquil
Referee: Alexander Ospina (Colombia)

Emelec won 5–0 on aggregate and advanced to the second stage.

=== Match E4 ===
13 February 2020
18:15 UTC−4

Zamora (Venezuela)	1–0	(Uruguay) Plaza Colonia
González 49'	Report

Estadio Agustín Tovar, Barinas
Referee: Rodolpho Toski (Brazil)

27 February 2020
19:15 UTC−3

Plaza Colonia (Uruguay)	3–0	(Venezuela) Zamora
Quintana 16'; Waller 18', 54'	Report

Estadio Profesor Alberto Suppici, Colonia del Sacramento (Note: Plaza Colonia played their home match at Estadio Profesor Alberto Suppici, Colonia del Sacramento, instead of their regular stadium Parque Juan Prandi, Colonia del Sacramento, which does not meet CONMEBOL requirements.)
Referee: Juan Benítez (Paraguay)

Plaza Colonia won 3–1 on aggregate and advanced to the second stage.

=== Match E5 ===
4 February 2020
18:15 UTC−4

Nacional Potosí (Bolivia)	0–2	(Peru) Melgar
	Report	Sánchez 5'; Arce 66'

Estadio Víctor Agustín Ugarte, Potosí
Referee: Gustavo Tejera (Uruguay)

18 February 2020
19:30 UTC−5

Melgar (Peru)	0–2	(Bolivia) Nacional Potosí
	Report	Royón 77', 86'
Penalties
Aubert (penalty scored); Tejeda (penalty scored); Ávila (penalty missed); Sánchez (penalty scored); Fuentes (penalty scored)	4–3	(penalty missed) R. Cabrera; (penalty scored) Pérez; (penalty missed) Fierro; (penalty scored) Bustamante; (penalty scored) A. Cabrera

Estadio Monumental de la UNSA, Arequipa
Referee: Luis Quiroz (Ecuador)

Tied 2–2 on aggregate, Melgar won on penalties and advanced to the second stage.

=== Match E6 ===
11 February 2020
17:15 UTC−5

Atlético Grau (Peru)	1–2	(Uruguay) River Plate
Ramírez 86'	Report	Olivera 16'; Neris 24'

Estadio Monumental, Lima (Note: Atlético Grau played their home match at Estadio Monumental, Lima, instead of their regular stadium Estadio Miguel Grau, Piura, which is being remodeled.)
Referee: Piero Maza (Chile)

25 February 2020
19:15 UTC−3

River Plate (Uruguay)	1–0	(Peru) Atlético Grau
Olivera 15'	Report

Parque Alfredo Víctor Viera, Montevideo (Note: River Plate played their home match at Parque Alfredo Víctor Viera, Montevideo, instead of their regular stadium Parque Federico Omar Saroldi, Montevideo, which does not meet CONMEBOL requirements.)
Referee: José Méndez (Paraguay)

River Plate won 3–1 on aggregate and advanced to the second stage.

=== Match E7 ===
6 February 2020
21:30 UTC−3

Unión (Argentina)	3–0	(Brazil) Atlético Mineiro
Bou 4'; Cabrera 43'; Carabajal 52'	Report

Estadio 15 de Abril, Santa Fe
Referee: Jesús Valenzuela (Venezuela)

20 February 2020
21:30 UTC−3

Atlético Mineiro (Brazil)	2–0	(Argentina) Unión
Otero 16'; Hyoran 29' (pen.)	Report

Estádio Independência, Belo Horizonte (Note: Atlético Mineiro played their home match at Estádio Independência, Belo Horizonte, instead of the originally scheduled Estádio Mineirão, Belo Horizonte.)
Referee: Nicolás Gallo (Colombia)

Unión won 3–2 on aggregate and advanced to the second stage.

=== Match E8 ===
12 February 2020
21:30 UTC−3

Bahia (Brazil)	3–0	(Paraguay) Nacional
Gilberto 40'; Gregore 42'; Élber 50'	Report

Itaipava Arena Fonte Nova, Salvador
Referee: Roberto Tobar (Chile)

26 February 2020
19:15 UTC−3

Nacional (Paraguay)	1–3	(Brazil) Bahia
Villagra 51' (pen.)	Report	Élber 3'; Gilberto 32' (pen.), 45'

Estadio Luis Alfonso Giagni, Villa Elisa (Note: Nacional played their home match at Estadio Luis Alfonso Giagni, Villa Elisa, instead of their regular stadium Estadio Arsenio Erico, Asunción, which does not meet CONMEBOL requirements.)
Referee: Patricio Loustau (Argentina)

Bahia won 6–1 on aggregate and advanced to the second stage.

=== Match E9 ===
5 February 2020
19:15 UTC−3

Fénix (Uruguay)	1–0	(Ecuador) El Nacional
Pallas 81'	Report

Parque Alfredo Víctor Viera, Montevideo (Note: Fénix played their home match at Parque Alfredo Víctor Viera, Montevideo, instead of their regular stadium Estadio Parque Capurro, Montevideo, which does not meet CONMEBOL requirements.)
Referee: Bruno Arleu (Brazil)

20 February 2020 (Note: The El Nacional v Fénix match was originally scheduled for 19 February 2020, 19:30 local time, but was re-scheduled to 20 February 2020, 19:30 local time to avoid a clash with the first leg of the 2020 Recopa Sudamericana, which was scheduled on 19 February 2020.)
19:30 UTC−5

El Nacional (Ecuador)	2–2	(Uruguay) Fénix
Matamoros 59'; Mejía 90+4'	Report	Franco 21'; Machado 81'

Estadio Olímpico Atahualpa, Quito
Referee: Nicolás Lamolina (Argentina)

Fénix won 3–2 on aggregate and advanced to the second stage.

=== Match E10 ===
5 February 2020
19:30 UTC−5

Atlético Nacional (Colombia)	3–0	(Argentina) Huracán
Muñoz 32'; Duque 38'; Hernández 42'	Report

Estadio Atanasio Girardot, Medellín
Attendance: 31,444
Referee: Anderson Daronco (Brazil)

19 February 2020
19:15 UTC−3

Huracán (Argentina)	1–1	(Colombia) Atlético Nacional
Grimi 21'	Report	Andrade 15' (pen.)

Estadio Tomás Adolfo Ducó, Buenos Aires
Referee: Julio Bascuñán (Chile)

Atlético Nacional won 4–1 on aggregate and advanced to the second stage.

=== Match E11 ===
11 February 2020
21:30 UTC−3

Sol de América (Paraguay)	1–0	(Brazil) Goiás
Viera 32'	Report

Estadio Luis Alfonso Giagni, Villa Elisa
Referee: Kevin Ortega (Peru)

25 February 2020
21:30 UTC−3

Goiás (Brazil)	0–1	(Paraguay) Sol de América
	Report	Novick 29' (pen.)

Estádio Olímpico Pedro Ludovico, Goiânia (Note: Goiás played their home match at Estádio Olímpico Pedro Ludovico, Goiânia, instead of their regular stadium Estádio Serra Dourada, Goiânia.)
Referee: Andrés Cunha (Uruguay)

Sol de América won 2–0 on aggregate and advanced to the second stage.

=== Match E12 ===
5 February 2020
18:15 UTC−4

Mineros (Venezuela)	2–3	(Paraguay) Sportivo Luqueño
Blanco 38', 42'	Report	Murillo 33'; Pitta 35'; Díaz 40'

Polideportivo Cachamay, Ciudad Guayana
Referee: Flavio Rodrigues de Souza (Brazil)

19 February 2020
19:15 UTC−3

Sportivo Luqueño (Paraguay)	2–2	(Venezuela) Mineros
Noguera 36'; Lima 70'	Report	Escoe 10'; Lima 13' (o.g.)

Estadio Luis Alfonso Giagni, Villa Elisa (Note: Sportivo Luqueño played their home match at Estadio Luis Alfonso Giagni, Villa Elisa, instead of their regular stadium Estadio Feliciano Cáceres, Luque, which is closed for repairs.)
Referee: Michael Espinoza (Peru)

Sportivo Luqueño won 5–4 on aggregate and advanced to the second stage.

=== Match E13 ===
4 February 2020
21:30 UTC−3

Vélez Sarsfield (Argentina)	1–0	(Ecuador) Aucas
Centurión 76'	Report

Estadio José Amalfitani, Buenos Aires
Referee: Gery Vargas (Bolivia)

18 February 2020
19:30 UTC−5

Aucas (Ecuador)	2–1	(Argentina) Vélez Sarsfield
Alvarado 49'; Espinoza 66'	Report	Almada 90+6' (pen.)

Estadio Gonzalo Pozo Ripalda, Quito
Referee: Rodolpho Toski (Brazil)

Tied 2–2 on aggregate, Vélez Sarsfield won on away goals and advanced to the second stage.

=== Match E14 ===
6 February 2020
19:30 UTC−5

Millonarios (Colombia)	2–0	(Bolivia) Always Ready
Silva 5'; Zapata 31'	Report

Estadio El Campín, Bogotá
Referee: Ángelo Hermosilla (Chile)

20 February 2020
18:15 UTC−4

Always Ready (Bolivia)	1–0	(Colombia) Millonarios
Cabrera 90'	Report

Estadio Hernando Siles, La Paz (Note: Always Ready played their home match at Estadio Hernando Siles, La Paz, instead of their regular stadium Estadio Municipal de Villa Ingenio, El Alto, which does not meet CONMEBOL requirements.)
Referee: Franklin Congo (Ecuador)

Millonarios won 2–1 on aggregate and advanced to the second stage.

=== Match E15 ===
12 February 2020
19:15 UTC−3

Lanús (Argentina)	3–0	(Ecuador) Universidad Católica
Acosta 53'; Orsini 75', 80'	Report

Estadio Ciudad de Lanús, Lanús
Referee: Éber Aquino (Paraguay)

26 February 2020
19:30 UTC−5

Universidad Católica (Ecuador)	2–0	(Argentina) Lanús
W. Chalá 39'; Tévez 50' (pen.)	Report

Estadio Olímpico Atahualpa, Quito
Referee: Gery Vargas (Bolivia)

Lanús won 3–2 on aggregate and advanced to the second stage.

=== Match E16 ===
11 February 2020
19:30 UTC−5

Deportivo Cali (Colombia)	2–1	(Paraguay) River Plate
Vásquez 5'; Arrieta 39'	Report	Pérez 77'

Estadio Deportivo Cali, Palmira
Referee: Diego Haro (Peru)

25 February 2020
21:30 UTC−3

River Plate (Paraguay)	1–3	(Colombia) Deportivo Cali
Pérez 53'	Report	Rodríguez 13'; Palavecino 68' (pen.), 89'

Estadio Luis Alfonso Giagni, Villa Elisa (Note: River Plate played their home match at Estadio Luis Alfonso Giagni, Villa Elisa, instead of their regular stadium Estadio River Plate, Asunción, which does not meet CONMEBOL requirements.)
Referee: Raphael Claus (Brazil)

Deportivo Cali won 5–2 on aggregate and advanced to the second stage.

=== Match E17 ===
11 February 2020
19:15 UTC−3

Argentinos Juniors (Argentina)	1–1	(Peru) Sport Huancayo
Hauche 71'	Report	Lliuya 45'

Estadio Diego Armando Maradona, Buenos Aires
Referee: Ángel Arteaga (Venezuela)

25 February 2020
19:30 UTC−5

Sport Huancayo (Peru)	0–0	(Argentina) Argentinos Juniors
	Report

Estadio Huancayo, Huancayo
Referee: Daniel Fedorczuk (Uruguay)

Tied 1–1 on aggregate, Sport Huancayo won on away goals and advanced to the second stage.

=== Match E18 ===
4 February 2020
21:30 UTC−3

Fluminense (Brazil)	1–1	(Chile) Unión La Calera
Evanilson 71'	Report	Castellani 74'

Estádio do Maracanã, Rio de Janeiro
Attendance: 17,771
Referee: Carlos Herrera (Colombia)

18 February 2020
19:15 UTC−3

Unión La Calera (Chile)	0–0	(Brazil) Fluminense
	Report

Estadio Municipal Nicolás Chahuán Nazar, La Calera
Referee: José Méndez (Paraguay)

Tied 1–1 on aggregate, Unión La Calera won on away goals and advanced to the second stage.

=== Match E19 ===
12 February 2020
19:15 UTC−3

Huachipato (Chile)	1–0	(Colombia) Deportivo Pasto
Sepúlveda 86' (pen.)	Report

Estadio CAP, Talcahuano
Attendance: 4,621
Referee: Franklin Congo (Ecuador)

26 February 2020
19:30 UTC−5

Deportivo Pasto (Colombia)	0–1	(Chile) Huachipato
	Report	Sánchez Sotelo 81'

Estadio Departamental Libertad, Pasto
Referee: Wilton Sampaio (Brazil)

Huachipato won 2–0 on aggregate and advanced to the second stage.

=== Match E20 ===
13 February 2020
19:30 UTC−5

Cusco (Peru)	2–0	(Chile) Audax Italiano
Vílchez 73'; Devecchi 83' (o.g.)	Report

Estadio Monumental de la UNSA, Arequipa (Note: Cusco played their home match at Estadio Monumental de la UNSA, Arequipa, instead of their regular stadium Estadio Garcilaso, Cusco, which did not meet CONMEBOL requirements.)
Referee: Luis Quiroz (Ecuador)

27 February 2020
21:30 UTC−3

Audax Italiano (Chile)	3–0	(Peru) Cusco
Holgado 40', 45', 65'	Report

Estadio Nacional Julio Martínez Prádanos, Santiago (Note: Audax Italiano played their home match at Estadio Nacional Julio Martínez Prádanos, Santiago, instead of their regular stadium Estadio Bicentenario de La Florida, Santiago.)
Referee: Augusto Aragón (Ecuador)

Audax Italiano won 3–2 on aggregate and advanced to the second stage.

=== Match E21 ===
13 February 2020
21:30 UTC−3

Independiente (Argentina)	1–0	(Brazil) Fortaleza
Fernández 51'	Report

Estadio Libertadores de América, Avellaneda
Referee: Wilmar Roldán (Colombia)

27 February 2020
21:30 UTC−3

Fortaleza (Brazil)	2–1	(Argentina) Independiente
Juninho 27' (pen.); Marlon 79'	Report	Bruno Melo 90+3' (o.g.)

Estádio Castelão, Fortaleza
Referee: Roberto Tobar (Chile)

Tied 2–2 on aggregate, Independiente won on away goals and advanced to the second stage.

=== Match E22 ===
12 February 2020
20:30 UTC−4

Llaneros (Venezuela)	0–2	(Uruguay) Liverpool
	Report	Dávila 31'; Figueredo 45+1'

Estadio Agustín Tovar, Barinas (Note: Llaneros played their home match at Estadio Agustín Tovar, Barinas, instead of their regular stadium Estadio Rafael Calles Pinto, Guanare, which does not meet CONMEBOL requirements.)
Referee: Ivo Méndez (Bolivia)

26 February 2020
19:15 UTC−3

Liverpool (Uruguay)	5–0	(Venezuela) Llaneros
Ocampo 13'; Pereira 20'; Correa 52', 90+1'; Alfaro 90+4'	Report

Estadio Luis Franzini, Montevideo (Note: Liverpool played their home match at Estadio Luis Franzini, Montevideo, instead of their regular stadium Estadio Belvedere, Montevideo, which does not meet CONMEBOL requirements.)
Referee: Kevin Ortega (Peru)

Liverpool won 7–0 on aggregate and advanced to the second stage.
