= 2020 Copa Sudamericana final stages =

The 2020 Copa Sudamericana final stages were played from 24 November 2020 to 23 January 2021. A total of 16 teams competed in the final stages to decide the champions of the 2020 Copa Sudamericana, with the final played in Córdoba, Argentina at the Estadio Mario Alberto Kempes.

The final stages had been originally scheduled to be played from 21 July to 7 November 2020, but were postponed due to the COVID-19 pandemic.

== Qualified teams ==
The 16 winners of the second stage advanced to the round of 16.

=== Seeding ===
Starting from the round of 16, the teams are seeded according to the second stage draw, with each team assigned a "seed" 1–16 corresponding to the tie they win (O1–O16) (Regulations Article 2.2.2.1).

Seed	Match	Second stage winners
1	O1	(Argentina) Independiente
2	O2	(Argentina) Unión
3	O3	(Chile) Unión La Calera
4	O4	(Chile) Universidad Católica
5	O5	(Colombia) Deportivo Cali
6	O6	(Peru) Sport Huancayo
7	O7	(Brazil) Vasco da Gama
8	O8	(Argentina) Lanús
9	O9	(Bolivia) Bolívar
10	O10	(Argentina) Defensa y Justicia
11	O11	(Chile) Coquimbo Unido
12	O12	(Argentina) Vélez Sarsfield
13	O13	(Uruguay) River Plate
14	O14	(Colombia) Junior
15	O15	(Brazil) Bahia
16	O16	(Uruguay) Fénix

== Format ==
Starting from the round of 16, the teams played a single-elimination tournament with the following rules:

- In the round of 16, quarter-finals, and semi-finals, each tie was played on a home-and-away two-legged basis, with the higher-seeded team hosting the second leg (Regulations Article 2.2.2). If tied on aggregate, the away goals rule was used. If still tied, extra time was not played, and a penalty shoot-out was used to determine the winner (Regulations Article 2.4.2).
- The final was played as a single match at a venue pre-selected by CONMEBOL, with the higher-seeded team designated as the "home" team for administrative purposes (Regulations Article 2.2.2.3). If tied after regulation, 30 minutes of extra time was played. If still tied after extra time, a penalty shoot-out was used to determine the winner (Regulations Article 2.4.3).

== Bracket ==
The bracket starting from the round of 16 was determined as follows:

Round	Matchups
Round of 16	(Higher-seeded team host second leg): Match A: Winner O1 vs. Winner O16; Match B: Winner O2 vs. Winner O15; Match C: Winner O3 vs. Winner O14; Match D: Winner O4 vs. Winner O13; Match E: Winner O5 vs. Winner O12; Match F: Winner O6 vs. Winner O11; Match G: Winner O7 vs. Winner O10; Match H: Winner O8 vs. Winner O9
Quarterfinals	(Higher-seeded team host second leg): Match S1: Winner A vs. Winner H; Match S2: Winner B vs. Winner G; Match S3: Winner C vs. Winner F; Match S4: Winner D vs. Winner E
Semifinals	(Higher-seeded team host second leg): Match F1: Winner S1 vs. Winner S4; Match F2: Winner S2 vs. Winner S3
Finals	(Higher-seeded team designated as "home" team): Winner F1 vs. Winner F2

The bracket was decided based on the second stage draw, which was held on 23 October 2020.

Round of 16
12	(Argentina) Vélez Sarsfield	2	5	7
5	(Colombia) Deportivo Cali	0	1	1
13	(Uruguay) River Plate	1	1	2
4	(Chile) Universidad Católica (a)	2	0	2
9	(Bolivia) Bolívar	2	2	4
8	(Argentina) Lanús	1	6	7
16	(Uruguay) Fénix	1	0	1
1	(Argentina) Independiente	4	1	5
14	(Colombia) Junior (p)	2	1	3 (4)
3	(Chile) Unión La Calera	1	2	3 (2)
11	(Chile) Coquimbo Unido	0	2	2
6	(Peru) Sport Huancayo	0	0	0
15	(Brazil) Bahia	1	0	1
2	(Argentina) Unión	0	0	0
10	(Argentina) Defensa y Justicia	1	1	2
7	(Brazil) Vasco da Gama	1	0	1

Quarter-finals
12	(Argentina) Vélez Sarsfield	1	3	4
4	(Chile) Universidad Católica	2	1	3
8	(Argentina) Lanús	0	3	3
1	(Argentina) Independiente	0	1	1
14	(Colombia) Junior	1	1	2
11	(Chile) Coquimbo Unido (a)	2	0	2
15	(Brazil) Bahia	2	0	2
10	(Argentina) Defensa y Justicia	3	1	4

Semi-finals
12	(Argentina) Vélez Sarsfield	0	0	0
8	(Argentina) Lanús	1	3	4
11	(Chile) Coquimbo Unido	0	2	2
10	(Argentina) Defensa y Justicia	0	4	4

Final
23 January 2021 – Córdoba
8	(Argentina) Lanús	0
10	(Argentina) Defensa y Justicia	3

== Round of 16 ==
The first legs were played on 24–26 November, and the second legs were played on 1–3 December 2020.

Team 1	Agg.	Team 2	1st leg	2nd leg
Fénix (Uruguay)	1–5	(Argentina) Independiente	1–4	0–1
Bahia (Brazil)	1–0	(Argentina) Unión	1–0	0–0
Junior (Colombia)	3–3 (4–2 p)	(Chile) Unión La Calera	2–1	1–2
River Plate (Uruguay)	2–2 (a)	(Chile) Universidad Católica	1–2	1–0
Vélez Sarsfield (Argentina)	7–1	(Colombia) Deportivo Cali	2–0	5–1
Coquimbo Unido (Chile)	2–0	(Peru) Sport Huancayo	0–0	2–0
Defensa y Justicia (Argentina)	2–1	(Brazil) Vasco da Gama	1–1	1–0
Bolívar (Bolivia)	4–7	(Argentina) Lanús	2–1	2–6

=== Match A ===
25 November 2020
21:30 UTC−3

Fénix (Uruguay)	1–4	(Argentina) Independiente
Olivera 29' (pen.)	Report	González 3'; Velasco 38'; S. Romero 44'; F. Martínez 51'

Parque Alfredo Víctor Viera, Montevideo (Note: Fénix played their home match at Parque Alfredo Víctor Viera, Montevideo, instead of their regular stadium Estadio Parque Capurro, Montevideo, which does not meet CONMEBOL requirements.)
Attendance: 0
Referee: Juan Benítez (Paraguay)

2 December 2020
21:30 UTC−3

Independiente (Argentina)	1–0	(Uruguay) Fénix
S. Romero 25'	Report

Estadio Libertadores de América, Avellaneda
Attendance: 0
Referee: Wilton Sampaio (Brazil)

Independiente won 5–1 on aggregate and advanced to the quarter-finals (Match S1).

=== Match B ===
24 November 2020
19:15 UTC−3

Bahia (Brazil)	1–0	(Argentina) Unión
Gilberto 78' (pen.)	Report

Itaipava Arena Fonte Nova, Salvador
Attendance: 0
Referee: Kevin Ortega (Peru)

1 December 2020
19:15 UTC−3

Unión (Argentina)	0–0	(Brazil) Bahia
	Report

Estadio 15 de Abril, Santa Fe
Attendance: 0
Referee: Alexander Ospina (Colombia)

Bahia won 1–0 on aggregate and advanced to the quarter-finals (Match S2).

=== Match C ===
26 November 2020
19:30 UTC−5

Junior (Colombia)	2–1	(Chile) Unión La Calera
Cetré 44'; Borja 84'	Report	Rodríguez 60'

Estadio Metropolitano Roberto Meléndez, Barranquilla
Attendance: 0
Referee: Facundo Tello (Argentina)

3 December 2020
19:15 UTC−3

Unión La Calera (Chile)	2–1	(Colombia) Junior
Cordero 45'; Leiva 59'	Report	Borja 1'
Penalties
Stefanelli (penalty missed); Cordero (penalty scored); A. Vilches (penalty missed); Rodríguez (penalty scored)	2–4	(penalty scored) Borja; (penalty scored) Cárdenas; (penalty scored) Valencia; (penalty scored) Fuentes

Estadio Municipal Nicolás Chahuán Nazar, La Calera
Attendance: 0
Referee: Bruno Arleu (Brazil)

Tied 3–3 on aggregate, Junior won on penalties and advanced to the quarter-finals (Match S3).

=== Match D ===
26 November 2020
19:15 UTC−3

River Plate (Uruguay)	1–2	(Chile) Universidad Católica
Píriz 45+3'	Report	Zampedri 9'; Aued 73' (pen.)

Parque Alfredo Víctor Viera, Montevideo (Note: River Plate played their home match at Parque Alfredo Víctor Viera, Montevideo, instead of their regular stadium Parque Federico Omar Saroldi, Montevideo, which does not meet CONMEBOL requirements.)
Attendance: 0
Referee: José Méndez (Paraguay)

3 December 2020
21:30 UTC−3

Universidad Católica (Chile)	0–1	(Uruguay) River Plate
	Report	Bonifazi 51'

Estadio San Carlos de Apoquindo, Santiago
Attendance: 0
Referee: Alexis Herrera (Venezuela)

Tied 2–2 on aggregate, Universidad Católica won on away goals and advanced to the quarter-finals (Match S4).

=== Match E ===
24 November 2020
21:30 UTC−3

Vélez Sarsfield (Argentina)	2–0	(Colombia) Deportivo Cali
Almada 73', 84'	Report

Estadio José Amalfitani, Buenos Aires
Attendance: 0
Referee: Cristian Garay (Chile)

1 December 2020
19:30 UTC−5

Deportivo Cali (Colombia)	1–5	(Argentina) Vélez Sarsfield
Palavecino 37'	Report	Janson 20', 35'; Abram 59'; Tarragona 75', 88'

Estadio Deportivo Cali, Palmira
Attendance: 0
Referee: Éber Aquino (Paraguay)

Vélez Sarsfield won 7–1 on aggregate and advanced to the quarter-finals (Match S4).

=== Match F ===
25 November 2020
21:30 UTC−3

Coquimbo Unido (Chile)	0–0	(Peru) Sport Huancayo
	Report

Estadio Municipal Francisco Sánchez Rumoroso, Coquimbo
Attendance: 0
Referee: Gery Vargas (Bolivia)

2 December 2020
19:30 UTC−5

Sport Huancayo (Peru)	0–2	(Chile) Coquimbo Unido
	Report	Vallejos 1'; Palacios 81'

Estadio Nacional, Lima (Note: Sport Huancayo played their home match at Estadio Nacional, Lima, instead of their regular stadium Estadio Huancayo, Huancayo.)
Attendance: 0
Referee: Augusto Aragón (Ecuador)

Coquimbo Unido won 2–0 on aggregate and advanced to the quarter-finals (Match S3).

=== Match G ===
26 November 2020
21:30 UTC−3

Defensa y Justicia (Argentina)	1–1	(Brazil) Vasco da Gama
Romero 79'	Report	Cano 62'

Estadio Norberto Tomaghello, Gobernador Costa
Attendance: 0
Referee: Andrés Matonte (Uruguay)

3 December 2020
21:30 UTC−3

Vasco da Gama (Brazil)	0–1	(Argentina) Defensa y Justicia
	Report	Hachen 58'

Estádio São Januário, Rio de Janeiro
Attendance: 0
Referee: Andrés Cunha (Uruguay)

Defensa y Justicia won 2–1 on aggregate and advanced to the quarter-finals (Match S2).

=== Match H ===
25 November 2020
18:15 UTC−4

Bolívar (Bolivia)	2–1	(Argentina) Lanús
Riquelme 45'; Haquín 86'	Report	Belmonte 32'

Estadio Hernando Siles, La Paz
Attendance: 0
Referee: Flávio Rodrigues de Souza (Brazil)

2 December 2020
19:15 UTC−3

Lanús (Argentina)	6–2	(Bolivia) Bolívar
Orozco 26', 54'; Belmonte 39', 49'; Acosta 63'; Orsini 86'	Report	Riquelme 4'; Rey 73'

Estadio Ciudad de Lanús, Lanús
Attendance: 0
Referee: Víctor Carrillo (Peru)

Lanús won 7–4 on aggregate and advanced to the quarter-finals (Match S1).

== Quarter-finals ==
The first legs were played on 8–10 December, and the second legs were played on 15–17 December 2020.

Team 1	Agg.	Team 2	1st leg	2nd leg
Lanús (Argentina)	3–1	(Argentina) Independiente	0–0	3–1
Bahia (Brazil)	2–4	(Argentina) Defensa y Justicia	2–3	0–1
Junior (Colombia)	2–2 (a)	(Chile) Coquimbo Unido	1–2	1–0
Vélez Sarsfield (Argentina)	4–3	(Chile) Universidad Católica	1–2	3–1

=== Match S1 ===
10 December 2020
19:15 UTC−3

Lanús (Argentina)	0–0	(Argentina) Independiente
	Report

Estadio Ciudad de Lanús, Lanús
Attendance: 0
Referee: Esteban Ostojich (Uruguay)

17 December 2020
19:15 UTC−3

Independiente (Argentina)	1–3	(Argentina) Lanús
Roa 88'	Report	Belmonte 15'; Sand 17'; Orsini 44'

Estadio Libertadores de América, Avellaneda
Attendance: 0
Referee: Raphael Claus (Brazil)

Lanús won 3–1 on aggregate and advanced to the semi-finals (Match F1).

=== Match S2 ===
9 December 2020
19:15 UTC−3

Bahia (Brazil)	2–3	(Argentina) Defensa y Justicia
Gilberto 40' (pen.); Matheus Bahia 80'	Report	Romero 4', 26' (pen.); Fernández 68'

Itaipava Arena Fonte Nova, Salvador
Attendance: 0
Referee: Guillermo Guerrero (Ecuador)

16 December 2020
19:15 UTC−3

Defensa y Justicia (Argentina)	1–0	(Brazil) Bahia
Romero 87'	Report

Estadio Norberto Tomaghello, Gobernador Costa
Attendance: 0
Referee: Éber Aquino (Paraguay)

Defensa y Justicia won 4–2 on aggregate and advanced to the semi-finals (Match F2).

=== Match S3 ===
9 December 2020
19:30 UTC−5

Junior (Colombia)	1–2	(Chile) Coquimbo Unido
Borja 25' (pen.)	Report	Abrigo 73'; Palacios 88'

Estadio Metropolitano Roberto Meléndez, Barranquilla
Attendance: 0
Referee: Jesús Valenzuela (Venezuela)

16 December 2020
21:30 UTC−3

Coquimbo Unido (Chile)	0–1	(Colombia) Junior
	Report	Borja 7' (pen.)

Estadio Municipal Francisco Sánchez Rumoroso, Coquimbo
Attendance: 0
Referee: Víctor Carrillo (Peru)

Tied 2–2 on aggregate, Coquimbo Unido won on away goals and advanced to the semi-finals (Match F2).

=== Match S4 ===
8 December 2020
21:30 UTC−3

Vélez Sarsfield (Argentina)	1–2	(Chile) Universidad Católica
Lucero 90'	Report	Zampedri 45+5'; Puch 50'

Estadio José Amalfitani, Buenos Aires
Attendance: 0
Referee: Bruno Arleu (Brazil)

15 December 2020
21:30 UTC−3

Universidad Católica (Chile)	1–3	(Argentina) Vélez Sarsfield
Aued 68' (pen.)	Report	Tarragona 17' (pen.); Orellano 73'; Lucero 90+4'

Estadio San Carlos de Apoquindo, Santiago
Attendance: 0
Referee: Leodán González (Uruguay)

Vélez Sarsfield won 4–3 on aggregate and advanced to the semi-finals (Match F1).

== Semi-finals ==
The first legs were played on 6 & 12 January 2021, and the second legs were played on 13 & 16 January 2021.

Team 1	Agg.	Team 2	1st leg	2nd leg
Vélez Sarsfield (Argentina)	0–4	(Argentina) Lanús	0–1	0–3
Coquimbo Unido (Chile)	2–4	(Argentina) Defensa y Justicia	0–0	2–4

=== Match F1 ===
6 January 2021
21:30 UTC−3

Vélez Sarsfield (Argentina)	0–1	(Argentina) Lanús
	Report	Sand 39'

Estadio José Amalfitani, Buenos Aires
Attendance: 0
Referee: Alexander Ospina (Colombia) (Note: Referee Andrés Rojas from Colombia, who was originally assigned to the Vélez Sarsfield v Lanús match, was replaced by Alexander Ospina.)

13 January 2021
21:30 UTC−3

Lanús (Argentina)	3–0	(Argentina) Vélez Sarsfield
Belmonte 45+3'; Orsini 60'; Bernabei 88'	Report

Estadio Ciudad de Lanús, Lanús
Attendance: 0
Referee: Wilton Sampaio (Brazil)

Lanús won 4–0 on aggregate and advanced to the final.

=== Match F2 ===
12 January 2021 (Note: The Coquimbo Unido v Defensa y Justicia match, originally scheduled on 7 January 2021, 21:30 local time was suspended after Chilean authorities decided to declare the entire Defensa y Justicia delegation as close contacts of a COVID-19 positive case and required them to comply with isolation measures. Furthermore, the match originally scheduled at Estadio Municipal Francisco Sánchez Rumoroso, Coquimbo, was first moved to Estadio Nacional Julio Martínez Prádanos, Santiago, and later to Estadio Manuel Ferreira in Asunción, Paraguay. The match was rescheduled for 12 January 2021, 19:15 local time.)
19:15 UTC−3

Coquimbo Unido (Chile)	0–0	(Argentina) Defensa y Justicia
	Report

Estadio Manuel Ferreira, Asunción (Paraguay)
Attendance: 0
Referee: Jesús Valenzuela (Venezuela)

16 January 2021 (Note: The Defensa y Justicia v Coquimbo Unido match, originally scheduled on 14 January 2021, 21:30 local time was re-scheduled for 16 January 2021, 20:30 local time due to the postponement of the first leg to 12 January 2021.)
20:30 UTC−3

Defensa y Justicia (Argentina)	4–2	(Chile) Coquimbo Unido
Pizzini 11'; Romero 20', 23', 44'	Report	Farfán 8'; Palacios 62'

Estadio Norberto Tomaghello, Gobernador Costa
Attendance: 0
Referee: Andrés Rojas (Colombia)

Defensa y Justicia won 4–2 on aggregate and advanced to the final.

== Final ==
The final was played on 23 January 2021 at the Estadio Mario Alberto Kempes in Córdoba.

23 January 2021
17:00 UTC−3

Lanús (Argentina)	0–3	(Argentina) Defensa y Justicia
	Report	Frías 34'; Romero 62'; Camacho 90+2'

Estadio Mario Alberto Kempes, Córdoba
Attendance: 0
Referee: Jesús Valenzuela (Venezuela) (Note: Referee Leodán González from Uruguay, who was originally assigned to the final match, was replaced by Jesús Valenzuela from Venezuela.)
