= 2020 Copa Sudamericana second stage =

The 2020 Copa Sudamericana second stage was played from 27 October to 5 November 2020. A total of 32 teams competed in the second stage to decide the 16 places in the final stages of the 2020 Copa Sudamericana.

The second stage had been originally scheduled to be played from 19 to 28 May 2020, but was postponed due to the COVID-19 pandemic.

== Draw ==
The draw for the second stage was held on 23 October 2020, 12:00 PYT (UTC−3). For the second stage, the teams were allocated to two pots according to their previous results in this season:

- Pot 1: 10 teams transferred from the Copa Libertadores and six best winners of the first stage from the Copa Sudamericana
- Pot 2: 16 remaining winners of the first stage from the Copa Sudamericana

The 32 teams were drawn into 16 ties (O1–O16) between a team from Pot 1 and a team from Pot 2, with the teams from Pot 1 hosting the second leg. Teams from the same association could be drawn into the same tie. The following are the 10 teams transferred from the Copa Libertadores (two best teams eliminated in the third stage of qualifying and eight third-placed teams in the group stage).

Match	Best teams eliminated in third stage	Second stage draw
G3	(Argentina) Atlético Tucumán	Pot 1
G4	(Colombia) Deportes Tolima	Pot 1
Group	Third-placed teams in group stage	Second stage draw
A	(Colombia) Junior	Pot 1
B	(Bolivia) Bolívar	Pot 1
C	(Uruguay) Peñarol	Pot 1
D	(Brazil) São Paulo	Pot 1
E	(Chile) Universidad Católica	Pot 1
F	(Venezuela) Estudiantes de Mérida	Pot 1
G	(Argentina) Defensa y Justicia	Pot 1
H	(Venezuela) Caracas	Pot 1

The following are the 22 winners of the first stage from the Copa Sudamericana. Matches in the first stage were considered for the ranking of teams for the second stage draw.

Pos	Match	First stage winners	Pld	W	D	L	GF	GA	GD	Pts	Second stage draw
1	E22	(Uruguay) Liverpool	2	2	0	0	7	0	+7	6	Pot 1
2	E8	(Brazil) Bahia	2	2	0	0	6	1	+5	6	Pot 1
3	E3	(Ecuador) Emelec	2	2	0	0	5	0	+5	6	Pot 1
4	E16	(Colombia) Deportivo Cali	2	2	0	0	5	2	+3	6	Pot 1
5	E6	(Uruguay) River Plate	2	2	0	0	3	1	+2	6	Pot 1
6	E19	(Chile) Huachipato	2	2	0	0	2	0	+2	6 (Note: CONMEBOL ranking: Huachipato 98, Sol de América 109.)	Pot 1
7	E11	(Paraguay) Sol de América	2	2	0	0	2	0	+2	6	Pot 2
8	E10	(Colombia) Atlético Nacional	2	1	1	0	4	1	+3	4	Pot 2
9	E12	(Paraguay) Sportivo Luqueño	2	1	1	0	5	4	+1	4	Pot 2
10	E9	(Uruguay) Fénix	2	1	1	0	3	2	+1	4	Pot 2
11	E2	(Brazil) Vasco da Gama	2	1	1	0	1	0	+1	4	Pot 2
12	E1	(Chile) Coquimbo Unido	2	1	0	1	3	1	+2	3 (Note: CONMEBOL ranking: Coquimbo Unido 191, Plaza Colonia unranked.)	Pot 2
13	E4	(Uruguay) Plaza Colonia	2	1	0	1	3	1	+2	3	Pot 2
14	E15	(Argentina) Lanús	2	1	0	1	3	2	+1	3 (Note: CONMEBOL ranking: Lanús 26, Audax Italiano 137, Unión unranked.)	Pot 2
15	E20	(Chile) Audax Italiano	2	1	0	1	3	2	+1	3	Pot 2
16	E7	(Argentina) Unión	2	1	0	1	3	2	+1	3	Pot 2
17	E14	(Colombia) Millonarios	2	1	0	1	2	1	+1	3	Pot 2
18	E5	(Peru) Melgar	2	1	0	1	2	2	0	3 (Note: Away goals scored: Melgar 2, Independiente 1, Vélez Sarsfield 1. CONMEBOL ranking: Independiente 20, Vélez Sarsfield 32.)	Pot 2
19	E21	(Argentina) Independiente	2	1	0	1	2	2	0	3	Pot 2
20	E13	(Argentina) Vélez Sarsfield	2	1	0	1	2	2	0	3	Pot 2
21	E17	(Peru) Sport Huancayo	2	0	2	0	1	1	0	2 (Note: CONMEBOL ranking: Sport Huancayo 198, Unión La Calera unranked.)	Pot 2
22	E18	(Chile) Unión La Calera	2	0	2	0	1	1	0	2	Pot 2

Source: CONMEBOL
Rules for classification: 1) Points; 2) Goal difference; 3) Goals scored; 4) Away goals scored; 5) CONMEBOL ranking.

== Format ==
In the second stage, each tie was played on a home-and-away two-legged basis. If tied on aggregate, the away goals rule was used. If still tied, extra time was not played, and a penalty shoot-out was used to determine the winner (Regulations Article 2.4.2).

The 16 winners of the second stage advanced to the round of 16 of the final stages.

== Matches ==
The first legs were played on 27–29 October, and the second legs were played on 3–5 November 2020.

Team 1	Agg.	Team 2	1st leg	2nd leg
Independiente (Argentina)	2–1	(Argentina) Atlético Tucumán	1–0	1–1
Unión (Argentina)	2–2 (a)	(Ecuador) Emelec	0–1	2–1
Unión La Calera (Chile)	1–1 (a)	(Colombia) Deportes Tolima	0–0	1–1
Sol de América (Paraguay)	1–2	(Chile) Universidad Católica	0–0	1–2
Millonarios (Colombia)	3–3 (4–5 p)	(Colombia) Deportivo Cali	1–2	2–1
Sport Huancayo (Peru)	3–2	(Uruguay) Liverpool	1–1	2–1
Vasco da Gama (Brazil)	1–0	(Venezuela) Caracas	1–0	0–0
Lanús (Argentina)	6–6 (a)	(Brazil) São Paulo	3–2	3–4
Audax Italiano (Chile)	2–4	(Bolivia) Bolívar	2–1	0–3
Sportivo Luqueño (Paraguay)	2–3	(Argentina) Defensa y Justicia	1–2	1–1
Coquimbo Unido (Chile)	5–0	(Venezuela) Estudiantes de Mérida	3–0	2–0
Vélez Sarsfield (Argentina)	1–1 (a)	(Uruguay) Peñarol	0–0	1–1
Atlético Nacional (Colombia)	2–4	(Uruguay) River Plate	1–1	1–3
Plaza Colonia (Uruguay)	0–1	(Colombia) Junior	0–1	0–0
Melgar (Peru)	1–4	(Brazil) Bahia	1–0	0–4
Fénix (Uruguay)	4–2	(Chile) Huachipato	3–1	1–1

=== Match O1 ===
29 October 2020
21:30 UTC−3

Independiente (Argentina)	1–0	(Argentina) Atlético Tucumán
S. Romero 27' (pen.)	Report

Estadio Libertadores de América, Avellaneda
Attendance: 0
Referee: Christian Ferreyra (Uruguay)

5 November 2020
21:30 UTC−3

Atlético Tucumán (Argentina)	1–1	(Argentina) Independiente
Heredia 40'	Report	S. Romero 20'

Estadio Monumental José Fierro, Tucumán
Attendance: 0
Referee: Andrés Cunha (Uruguay)

Independiente won 2–1 on aggregate and advanced to the round of 16 (Match A).

=== Match O2 ===
29 October 2020
19:15 UTC−3

Unión (Argentina)	0–1	(Ecuador) Emelec
	Report	Barceló 43'

Estadio 15 de Abril, Santa Fe
Attendance: 0
Referee: Andrés Cunha (Uruguay)

5 November 2020
17:15 UTC−5

Emelec (Ecuador)	1–2	(Argentina) Unión
Barceló 62'	Report	Cabrera 21'; Márquez 76' (pen.)

Estadio George Capwell, Guayaquil
Attendance: 0
Referee: Ángelo Hermosilla (Chile)

Tied 2–2 on aggregate, Unión won on away goals and advanced to the round of 16 (Match B).

=== Match O3 ===
27 October 2020
21:30 UTC−3

Unión La Calera (Chile)	0–0	(Colombia) Deportes Tolima
	Report

Estadio Municipal Nicolás Chahuán Nazar, La Calera
Attendance: 0
Referee: Fernando Echenique (Argentina)

3 November 2020
19:30 UTC−5

Deportes Tolima (Colombia)	1–1	(Chile) Unión La Calera
Campaz 36'	Report	A. Vilches 45+1'

Estadio Manuel Murillo Toro, Ibagué
Attendance: 0
Referee: Augusto Aragón (Ecuador)

Tied 1–1 on aggregate, Unión La Calera won on away goals and advanced to the round of 16 (Match C).

=== Match O4 ===
29 October 2020
19:15 UTC−3

Sol de América (Paraguay)	0–0	(Chile) Universidad Católica
	Report

Estadio Luis Alfonso Giagni, Villa Elisa
Attendance: 0
Referee: Nicolás Lamolina (Argentina)

5 November 2020
21:30 UTC−3

Universidad Católica (Chile)	2–1	(Paraguay) Sol de América
Buonanotte 64'; Zampedri 81'	Report	Viera 57' (pen.)

Estadio San Carlos de Apoquindo, Santiago
Attendance: 0
Referee: Fernando Espinoza (Argentina)

Universidad Católica won 2–1 on aggregate and advanced to the round of 16 (Match D).

=== Match O5 ===
28 October 2020
19:30 UTC−5

Millonarios (Colombia)	1–2	(Colombia) Deportivo Cali
Arango 46'	Report	Colorado 75'; Menosse 85'

Estadio El Campín, Bogotá
Attendance: 0
Referee: Franklin Congo (Ecuador)

4 November 2020
19:30 UTC−5

Deportivo Cali (Colombia)	1–2	(Colombia) Millonarios
Menosse 23'	Report	Colorado 30' (o.g.); Quiñones 90+3'
Penalties
Lizarazo (penalty scored); Gómez (penalty scored); Velasco (penalty scored); Angulo (penalty missed); Rodríguez (penalty scored); Roa (penalty scored)	5–4	(penalty scored) Salazar; (penalty scored) Vargas; (penalty scored) Márquez; (penalty missed) Montoya; (penalty scored) Quiñones; (penalty missed) Silva

Estadio Deportivo Cali, Palmira
Attendance: 0
Referee: Wilton Sampaio (Brazil)

Tied 3–3 on aggregate, Deportivo Cali won on penalties and advanced to the round of 16 (Match E).

=== Match O6 ===
27 October 2020
17:15 UTC−5

Sport Huancayo (Peru)	1–1	(Uruguay) Liverpool
Ángeles 60'	Report	Ramírez 54'

Estadio Nacional, Lima (Note: Sport Huancayo played their home match at Estadio Nacional, Lima, instead of their regular stadium Estadio Huancayo, Huancayo.)
Attendance: 0
Referee: Marlon Vera (Ecuador)

3 November 2020
19:15 UTC−3

Liverpool (Uruguay)	1–2	(Peru) Sport Huancayo
Ocampo 49'	Report	Morales 41'; Neumann 78'

Estadio Luis Franzini, Montevideo (Note: Liverpool played their home match at Estadio Luis Franzini, Montevideo, instead of their regular stadium Estadio Belvedere, Montevideo, which does not meet CONMEBOL requirements.)
Attendance: 0
Referee: Arnaldo Samaniego (Paraguay)

Sport Huancayo won 3–2 on aggregate and advanced to the round of 16 (Match F).

=== Match O7 ===
28 October 2020
21:30 UTC−3

Vasco da Gama (Brazil)	1–0	(Venezuela) Caracas
Tiago Reis 89'	Report

Estádio São Januário, Rio de Janeiro
Attendance: 0
Referee: Michael Espinoza (Peru)

4 November 2020
20:30 UTC−4

Caracas (Venezuela)	0–0	(Brazil) Vasco da Gama
	Report

Estadio Olímpico de la UCV, Caracas
Attendance: 0
Referee: Alexander Ospina (Colombia)

Vasco da Gama won 1–0 on aggregate and advanced to the round of 16 (Match G).

=== Match O8 ===
28 October 2020
19:15 UTC−3

Lanús (Argentina)	3–2	(Brazil) São Paulo
Sand 53', 84'; Quignon 90+1'	Report	Brenner 13', 87'

Estadio Ciudad de Lanús, Lanús
Attendance: 0
Referee: Christian Ferreyra (Uruguay)

4 November 2020
19:15 UTC−3

São Paulo (Brazil)	4–3	(Argentina) Lanús
Dani Alves 27'; Pablo 62'; Thaller 87' (o.g.); Gabriel Sara 89'	Report	De la Vega 17'; Aguirre 45'; Orsini 90+3'

Estádio do Morumbi, São Paulo
Attendance: 0
Referee: Alexis Herrera (Venezuela)

Tied 6–6 on aggregate, Lanús won on away goals and advanced to the round of 16 (Match H).

=== Match O9 ===
27 October 2020
19:15 UTC−3

Audax Italiano (Chile)	2–1	(Bolivia) Bolívar
Orellana 15'; Ramírez 84'	Report	Saavedra 23' (pen.)

Estadio San Carlos de Apoquindo, Santiago (Note: Audax Italiano played their home match at Estadio San Carlos de Apoquindo, Santiago, instead of their regular stadium Estadio Bicentenario de La Florida, Santiago.)
Attendance: 0
Referee: Fernando Espinoza (Argentina)

3 November 2020
18:15 UTC−4

Bolívar (Bolivia)	3–0	(Chile) Audax Italiano
Abrego 21'; Riquelme 69'; Fernández 90+7'	Report

Estadio Hernando Siles, La Paz
Attendance: 0
Referee: Kevin Ortega (Peru)

Bolívar won 4–2 on aggregate and advanced to the round of 16 (Match H).

=== Match O10 ===
28 October 2020
19:15 UTC−3

Sportivo Luqueño (Paraguay)	1–2	(Argentina) Defensa y Justicia
A. Vera 8'	Report	A. Vera 31' (o.g.); Romero 55'

Estadio Luis Alfonso Giagni, Villa Elisa (Note: Sportivo Luqueño played their home match at Estadio Luis Alfonso Giagni, Villa Elisa, instead of their regular stadium Estadio Feliciano Cáceres, Luque, which is closed for repairs.)
Attendance: 0
Referee: Andrés Matonte (Uruguay)

4 November 2020
19:15 UTC−3

Defensa y Justicia (Argentina)	1–1	(Paraguay) Sportivo Luqueño
Romero 82'	Report	Morales 45'

Estadio Norberto Tomaghello, Gobernador Costa
Attendance: 0
Referee: Christian Ferreyra (Uruguay)

Defensa y Justicia won 3–2 on aggregate and advanced to the round of 16 (Match G).

=== Match O11 ===
29 October 2020
19:15 UTC−3

Coquimbo Unido (Chile)	3–0	(Venezuela) Estudiantes de Mérida
Vallejos 50'; Aravena 59'; Palacios 71'	Report

Estadio Municipal Francisco Sánchez Rumoroso, Coquimbo
Attendance: 0
Referee: Jordy Alemán (Bolivia)

5 November 2020
18:15 UTC−4

Estudiantes de Mérida (Venezuela)	0–2	(Chile) Coquimbo Unido
	Report	Abrigo 8'; Palacios 55'

Estadio Metropolitano de Mérida, Mérida
Attendance: 0
Referee: Luis Quiroz (Ecuador)

Coquimbo Unido won 5–0 on aggregate and advanced to the round of 16 (Match F).

=== Match O12 ===
28 October 2020
21:30 UTC−3

Vélez Sarsfield (Argentina)	0–0	(Uruguay) Peñarol
	Report

Estadio José Amalfitani, Buenos Aires
Attendance: 0
Referee: Derlis López (Paraguay)

4 November 2020
21:30 UTC−3

Peñarol (Uruguay)	1–1	(Argentina) Vélez Sarsfield
Rodríguez 90+6' (pen.)	Report	Almada 90+3' (pen.)

Estadio Campeón del Siglo, Montevideo
Attendance: 0
Referee: Flávio Rodrigues de Souza (Brazil)

Tied 1–1 on aggregate, Vélez Sarsfield won on away goals and advanced to the round of 16 (Match E).

=== Match O13 ===
28 October 2020
17:15 UTC−5

Atlético Nacional (Colombia)	1–1	(Uruguay) River Plate
Hernández 34'	Report	Salaberry 69'

Estadio Atanasio Girardot, Medellín
Attendance: 0
Referee: Ángel Arteaga (Venezuela)

4 November 2020
19:15 UTC−3

River Plate (Uruguay)	3–1	(Colombia) Atlético Nacional
Arezo 5', 26'; Píriz 90'	Report	Duque 34'

Parque Alfredo Víctor Viera, Montevideo (Note: River Plate played their home match at Parque Alfredo Víctor Viera, Montevideo, instead of their regular stadium Parque Federico Omar Saroldi, Montevideo, which does not meet CONMEBOL requirements.)
Attendance: 0
Referee: Andrés Merlos (Argentina)

River Plate won 4–2 on aggregate and advanced to the round of 16 (Match D).

=== Match O14 ===
29 October 2020
21:30 UTC−3

Plaza Colonia (Uruguay)	0–1	(Colombia) Junior
	Report	Gutiérrez 87'

Estadio Profesor Alberto Suppici, Colonia del Sacramento (Note: Plaza Colonia played their home match at Estadio Profesor Alberto Suppici, Colonia del Sacramento, instead of their regular stadium Parque Juan Prandi, Colonia del Sacramento, which does not meet CONMEBOL requirements.)
Attendance: 0
Referee: Andrés Merlos (Argentina)

5 November 2020
19:30 UTC−5

Junior (Colombia)	0–0	(Uruguay) Plaza Colonia
	Report

Estadio Metropolitano Roberto Meléndez, Barranquilla
Attendance: 0
Referee: Ángel Arteaga (Venezuela)

Junior won 1–0 on aggregate and advanced to the round of 16 (Match C).

=== Match O15 ===
29 October 2020
19:30 UTC−5

Melgar (Peru)	1–0	(Brazil) Bahia
Nino Paraíba 80' (o.g.)	Report

Estadio Nacional, Lima (Note: Melgar played their home match at Estadio Nacional, Lima, instead of their regular stadium Estadio Monumental de la UNSA, Arequipa.)
Attendance: 0
Referee: Carlos Betancur (Colombia)

5 November 2020
21:30 UTC−3

Bahia (Brazil)	4–0	(Peru) Melgar
Fessin 12', 34'; Gregore 20'; Gilberto 35'	Report

Itaipava Arena Fonte Nova, Salvador
Attendance: 0
Referee: Cristian Garay (Chile)

Bahia won 4–1 on aggregate and advanced to the round of 16 (Match B).

=== Match O16 ===
28 October 2020
19:15 UTC−3

Fénix (Uruguay)	3–1	(Chile) Huachipato
Nequecaur 53', 62'; Scorza 81'	Report	Sánchez Sotelo 77'

Parque Alfredo Víctor Viera, Montevideo (Note: Fénix played their home match at Parque Alfredo Víctor Viera, Montevideo, instead of their regular stadium Estadio Parque Capurro, Montevideo, which does not meet CONMEBOL requirements.)
Attendance: 0
Referee: Arnaldo Samaniego (Paraguay)

4 November 2020
19:15 UTC−3

Huachipato (Chile)	1–1	(Uruguay) Fénix
Rodríguez 73' (o.g.)	Report	Nequecaur 81'

Estadio CAP, Talcahuano
Attendance: 0
Referee: Ivo Méndez (Bolivia)

Fénix won 4–2 on aggregate and advanced to the round of 16 (Match A).
