= 2020 Copa Sudamericana =

Copa CONMEBOL Sudamericana 2020
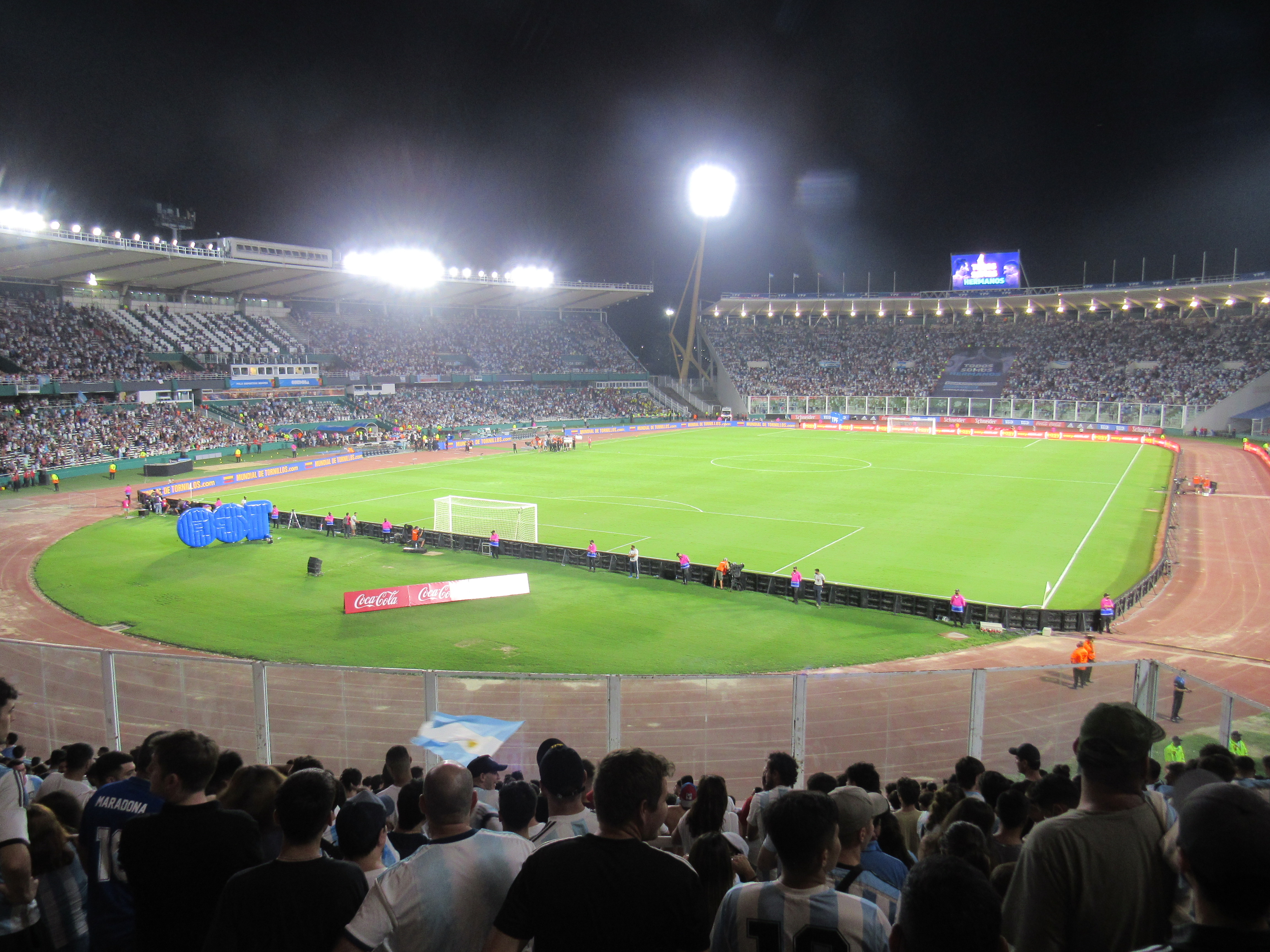
- The Estadio Mario Alberto Kempes in Córdoba hosted the final

Tournament details
- Dates: 4 February 2020 – 23 January 2021
- Teams: 44+10 (from 10 associations)

Final positions
- Champions: (Argentina) Defensa y Justicia (1st title)
- Runners-up: (Argentina) Lanús

Tournament statistics
- Matches played: 105
- Goals scored: 239 (2.28 per match)
- Top scorer: (Argentina) Braian Romero (10 goals)

The 2020 Copa CONMEBOL Sudamericana was the 19th edition of the CONMEBOL Sudamericana (also referred to as the Copa Sudamericana, or Portuguese: Copa Sul-Americana), South America's secondary club football tournament organized by CONMEBOL.

On 17 October 2019, CONMEBOL announced that the final would be played at the Estadio Mario Alberto Kempes in Córdoba, Argentina with the final originally scheduled to be played on 7 November 2020. Argentine club Defensa y Justicia defeated fellow Argentine club Lanús by a 3–0 score in the final to win their first tournament title. As champions, Defensa y Justicia earned the right to play against the winners of the 2020 Copa Libertadores in the 2021 Recopa Sudamericana. They also automatically qualified for the 2021 Copa Libertadores group stage. Independiente del Valle were the defending champions, but did not play this edition as they qualified for the 2020 Copa Libertadores group stage as Copa Sudamericana champions and later advanced to the knockout stage.

On 21 May 2019, CONMEBOL announced that clubs must pass certain eligibility requirements in order to compete in the 2020 Copa Libertadores and Copa Sudamericana. One of the original requirements was that teams must be in the top division of their member association, but this was removed after many associations stated that they had not adapted the regulations of their qualifying competitions for the 2020 Copa Libertadores and Copa Sudamericana.

The tournament was suspended after its first round due to the COVID-19 pandemic and resumed on 27 October 2020. It ended with the final on 23 January 2021.

== Teams ==
The following 44 teams from the 10 CONMEBOL associations qualified for the tournament, entering the first stage:

- Argentina and Brazil: 6 berths each
- All other associations: 4 berths each

Association	Team (Berth)	Qualification method
Argentina (6 berths)	Argentinos Juniors (Argentina 1)	2019 Copa de la Superliga best team not qualified for 2020 Copa Libertadores
Argentina (6 berths)	Vélez Sarsfield (Argentina 2)	2018–19 Superliga Argentina best team not qualified for 2020 Copa Libertadores
Argentina (6 berths)	Independiente (Argentina 3)	2018–19 Superliga Argentina 2nd best team not qualified for 2020 Copa Libertadores
Argentina (6 berths)	Unión (Argentina 4)	2018–19 Superliga Argentina 3rd best team not qualified for 2020 Copa Libertadores
Argentina (6 berths)	Huracán (Argentina 5)	2018–19 Superliga Argentina 4th best team not qualified for 2020 Copa Libertadores
Argentina (6 berths)	Lanús (Argentina 6)	2018–19 Superliga Argentina 5th best team not qualified for 2020 Copa Libertadores
Bolivia (4 berths)	Nacional Potosí (Bolivia 1)	2019 Primera División aggregate table best team not qualified for 2020 Copa Libertadores
Bolivia (4 berths)	Blooming (Bolivia 2)	2019 Primera División aggregate table 2nd best team not qualified for 2020 Copa Libertadores
Bolivia (4 berths)	Always Ready (Bolivia 3)	2019 Primera División aggregate table 3rd best team not qualified for 2020 Copa Libertadores
Bolivia (4 berths)	Oriente Petrolero (Bolivia 4)	2019 Primera División aggregate table 4th best team not qualified for 2020 Copa Libertadores
Brazil (6 berths)	Fortaleza (Brazil 1)	2019 Campeonato Brasileiro Série A best team not qualified for 2020 Copa Libertadores
Brazil (6 berths)	Goiás (Brazil 2)	2019 Campeonato Brasileiro Série A 2nd best team not qualified for 2020 Copa Libertadores
Brazil (6 berths)	Bahia (Brazil 3)	2019 Campeonato Brasileiro Série A 3rd best team not qualified for 2020 Copa Libertadores
Brazil (6 berths)	Vasco da Gama (Brazil 4)	2019 Campeonato Brasileiro Série A 4th best team not qualified for 2020 Copa Libertadores
Brazil (6 berths)	Atlético Mineiro (Brazil 5)	2019 Campeonato Brasileiro Série A 5th best team not qualified for 2020 Copa Libertadores
Brazil (6 berths)	Fluminense (Brazil 6)	2019 Campeonato Brasileiro Série A 6th best team not qualified for 2020 Copa Libertadores
Chile (4 berths)	Unión La Calera (Chile 1)	2019 Primera División best team not qualified for 2020 Copa Libertadores
Chile (4 berths)	Coquimbo Unido (Chile 2)	2019 Primera División 2nd best team not qualified for 2020 Copa Libertadores
Chile (4 berths)	Huachipato (Chile 3)	2019 Primera División 3rd best team not qualified for 2020 Copa Libertadores
Chile (4 berths)	Audax Italiano (Chile 4)	2019 Primera División 4th best team not qualified for 2020 Copa Libertadores
Colombia (4 berths)	Deportivo Cali (Colombia 1)	2019 Primera A aggregate table best team not qualified for 2020 Copa Libertadores
Colombia (4 berths)	Atlético Nacional (Colombia 2)	2019 Primera A aggregate table 2nd best team not qualified for 2020 Copa Libertadores
Colombia (4 berths)	Millonarios (Colombia 3)	2019 Primera A aggregate table 3rd best team not qualified for 2020 Copa Libertadores
Colombia (4 berths)	Deportivo Pasto (Colombia 4)	2019 Primera A aggregate table 4th best team not qualified for 2020 Copa Libertadores
Ecuador (4 berths)	Universidad Católica (Ecuador 1)	2019 Serie A classification table best team not qualified for 2020 Copa Libertadores
Ecuador (4 berths)	Aucas (Ecuador 2)	2019 Serie A classification table 2nd best team not qualified for 2020 Copa Libertadores
Ecuador (4 berths)	Emelec (Ecuador 3)	2019 Serie A classification table 3rd best team not qualified for 2020 Copa Libertadores
Ecuador (4 berths)	El Nacional (Ecuador 4)	2019 Serie A classification table 4th best team not qualified for 2020 Copa Libertadores
Paraguay (4 berths)	Sol de América (Paraguay 1)	2019 Primera División aggregate table best team not qualified for 2020 Copa Libertadores
Paraguay (4 berths)	Nacional (Paraguay 2)	2019 Primera División aggregate table 2nd best team not qualified for 2020 Copa Libertadores
Paraguay (4 berths)	River Plate (Paraguay 3)	2019 Primera División aggregate table 3rd best team not qualified for 2020 Copa Libertadores
Paraguay (4 berths)	Sportivo Luqueño (Paraguay 4)	2019 Primera División aggregate table 4th best team not qualified for 2020 Copa Libertadores
Peru (4 berths)	Sport Huancayo (Peru 1)	2019 Liga 1 aggregate table best team not qualified for 2020 Copa Libertadores
Peru (4 berths)	Melgar (Peru 2)	2019 Liga 1 aggregate table 2nd best team not qualified for 2020 Copa Libertadores
Peru (4 berths)	Cusco (Peru 3)	2019 Liga 1 aggregate table 3rd best team not qualified for 2020 Copa Libertadores
Peru (4 berths)	Atlético Grau (Peru 4)	2019 Copa Bicentenario champions
Uruguay (4 berths)	Liverpool (Uruguay 1)	2019 Intermedio winners
Uruguay (4 berths)	Plaza Colonia (Uruguay 2)	2019 Primera División aggregate table 2nd best team not qualified for 2020 Copa Libertadores
Uruguay (4 berths)	River Plate (Uruguay 3)	2019 Primera División aggregate table 3rd best team not qualified for 2020 Copa Libertadores
Uruguay (4 berths)	Fénix (Uruguay 4)	2019 Primera División aggregate table 4th best team not qualified for 2020 Copa Libertadores
Venezuela (4 berths)	Zamora (Venezuela 1)	2019 Copa Venezuela champions
Venezuela (4 berths)	Mineros de Guayana (Venezuela 2)	2019 Apertura runners-up
Venezuela (4 berths)	Llaneros (Venezuela 3)	2019 Clausura classification table best team not qualified for 2020 Copa Libertadores
Venezuela (4 berths)	Aragua (Venezuela 4)	2019 Primera División aggregate table best team not yet qualified

A further 10 teams eliminated from the 2020 Copa Libertadores will be transferred to the Copa Sudamericana, entering the second stage.

Best teams eliminated in third stage
(Argentina) Atlético Tucumán
(Colombia) Deportes Tolima
Third-placed teams in group stage
(Colombia) Junior
(Bolivia) Bolívar
(Uruguay) Peñarol
(Brazil) São Paulo
(Chile) Universidad Católica
(Venezuela) Estudiantes de Mérida
(Argentina) Defensa y Justicia
(Venezuela) Caracas

== Schedule ==
The schedule of the competition was as follows.

On 17 April 2020, CONMEBOL announced that the tournament would be suspended indefinitely due to the COVID-19 pandemic, and no date had been set for its resumption. On 10 July 2020, CONMEBOL announced the new schedule for the remainder of the competition.

Stage	Draw date	First leg	Second leg
First stage	17 December 2019	4–6 February 2020; 11–13 February 2020	18–20 February 2020; 25–27 February 2020
Second stage	23 October 2020 (originally 13 May 2020)	27–29 October 2020 (originally 19–21 May 2020)	3–5 November 2020 (originally 26–28 May 2020)
Round of 16	23 October 2020 (originally 13 May 2020)	24–26 November 2020 (originally 21–23 July 2020)	1–3 December 2020 (originally 28–30 July 2020)
Quarter-finals	23 October 2020 (originally 13 May 2020)	8–10 December 2020 (originally 18–20 August 2020)	15–17 December 2020 (originally 25–27 August 2020)
Semi-finals	23 October 2020 (originally 13 May 2020)	5–12 January 2021 (originally 22–24 September 2020)	12–16 January 2021 (originally 29 September – 1 October 2020)
Final	23 October 2020 (originally 13 May 2020)	23 January 2021 (originally 7 November 2020) at Estadio Mario Alberto Kempes, Córdoba	

== Draws ==
Location of teams of the 2020 Copa Sudamericana.
(L) Teams transferred from the 2020 Copa Libertadores

The draw for the first stage was held on 17 December 2019, 20:30 PYST (UTC−3), at the CONMEBOL Convention Centre in Luque, Paraguay. For the first stage, the teams were divided into two pots according to their geographical zones:

- Pot A (South Zone): 22 teams from Argentina, Bolivia, Chile, Paraguay, and Uruguay
- Pot B (North Zone): 22 teams from Brazil, Colombia, Ecuador, Peru, and Venezuela

The 44 teams were drawn into 22 ties (E1–E22) between a team from Pot A and a team from Pot B, with the teams from Pot B hosting the second leg in odd-numbered ties, and the teams from Pot A hosting the second leg in even-numbered ties. This distribution ensured that teams from the same association could not be drawn into the same tie. The draw for the second stage was held on 23 October 2020, 12:00 PYT (UTC−3). For the second stage, the teams were allocated to two pots according to their previous results in this season:

- Pot 1: 10 teams transferred from the Copa Libertadores and six best winners of the first stage from the Copa Sudamericana
- Pot 2: 16 remaining winners of the first stage from the Copa Sudamericana

The 32 teams were drawn into 16 ties (O1–O16) between a team from Pot 1 and a team from Pot 2, with the teams from Pot 1 hosting the second leg. Teams from the same association could be drawn into the same tie.

== First stage ==
In the first stage, each tie was played on a home-and-away two-legged basis. If tied on aggregate, the away goals rule was used. If still tied, extra time was not played, and a penalty shoot-out was used to determine the winner (Regulations Article 2.4.2).

The 22 winners of the first stage advanced to the second stage to join the 10 teams transferred from the Copa Libertadores (two best teams eliminated in the third stage of qualifying and eight third-placed teams in the group stage).

Team 1	Agg.	Team 2	1st leg	2nd leg
Coquimbo Unido (Chile)	3–1	(Venezuela) Aragua	3–0	0–1
Vasco da Gama (Brazil)	1–0	(Bolivia) Oriente Petrolero	1–0	0–0
Blooming (Bolivia)	0–5	(Ecuador) Emelec	0–3	0–2
Zamora (Venezuela)	1–3	(Uruguay) Plaza Colonia	1–0	0–3
Nacional Potosí (Bolivia)	2–2 (3–4 p)	(Peru) Melgar	0–2	2–0
Atlético Grau (Peru)	1–3	(Uruguay) River Plate	1–2	0–1
Unión (Argentina)	3–2	(Brazil) Atlético Mineiro	3–0	0–2
Bahia (Brazil)	6–1	(Paraguay) Nacional	3–0	3–1
Fénix (Uruguay)	3–2	(Ecuador) El Nacional	1–0	2–2
Atlético Nacional (Colombia)	4–1	(Argentina) Huracán	3–0	1–1
Sol de América (Paraguay)	2–0	(Brazil) Goiás	1–0	1–0
Mineros de Guayana (Venezuela)	4–5	(Paraguay) Sportivo Luqueño	2–3	2–2
Vélez Sarsfield (Argentina)	2–2 (a)	(Ecuador) Aucas	1–0	1–2
Millonarios (Colombia)	2–1	(Bolivia) Always Ready	2–0	0–1
Lanús (Argentina)	3–2	(Ecuador) Universidad Católica	3–0	0–2
Deportivo Cali (Colombia)	5–2	(Paraguay) River Plate	2–1	3–1
Argentinos Juniors (Argentina)	1–1 (a)	(Peru) Sport Huancayo	1–1	0–0
Fluminense (Brazil)	1–1 (a)	(Chile) Unión La Calera	1–1	0–0
Huachipato (Chile)	2–0	(Colombia) Deportivo Pasto	1–0	1–0
Cusco (Peru)	2–3	(Chile) Audax Italiano	2–0	0–3
Independiente (Argentina)	2–2 (a)	(Brazil) Fortaleza	1–0	1–2
Llaneros (Venezuela)	0–7	(Uruguay) Liverpool	0–2	0–5

== Second stage ==
In the second stage, each tie was played on a home-and-away two-legged basis. If tied on aggregate, the away goals rule was used. If still tied, extra time was not played, and a penalty shoot-out was used to determine the winner (Regulations Article 2.4.2).

The 16 winners of the second stage advanced to the round of 16 of the final stages.

Team 1	Agg.	Team 2	1st leg	2nd leg
Independiente (Argentina)	2–1	(Argentina) Atlético Tucumán	1–0	1–1
Unión (Argentina)	2–2 (a)	(Ecuador) Emelec	0–1	2–1
Unión La Calera (Chile)	1–1 (a)	(Colombia) Deportes Tolima	0–0	1–1
Sol de América (Paraguay)	1–2	(Chile) Universidad Católica	0–0	1–2
Millonarios (Colombia)	3–3 (4–5 p)	(Colombia) Deportivo Cali	1–2	2–1
Sport Huancayo (Peru)	3–2	(Uruguay) Liverpool	1–1	2–1
Vasco da Gama (Brazil)	1–0	(Venezuela) Caracas	1–0	0–0
Lanús (Argentina)	6–6 (a)	(Brazil) São Paulo	3–2	3–4
Audax Italiano (Chile)	2–4	(Bolivia) Bolívar	2–1	0–3
Sportivo Luqueño (Paraguay)	2–3	(Argentina) Defensa y Justicia	1–2	1–1
Coquimbo Unido (Chile)	5–0	(Venezuela) Estudiantes de Mérida	3–0	2–0
Vélez Sarsfield (Argentina)	1–1 (a)	(Uruguay) Peñarol	0–0	1–1
Atlético Nacional (Colombia)	2–4	(Uruguay) River Plate	1–1	1–3
Plaza Colonia (Uruguay)	0–1	(Colombia) Junior	0–1	0–0
Melgar (Peru)	1–4	(Brazil) Bahia	1–0	0–4
Fénix (Uruguay)	4–2	(Chile) Huachipato	3–1	1–1

== Final stages ==
Starting from the round of 16, the teams played a single-elimination tournament with the following rules:

- In the round of 16, quarter-finals, and semi-finals, each tie was played on a home-and-away two-legged basis, with the higher-seeded team hosting the second leg (Regulations Article 2.2.2). If tied on aggregate, the away goals rule was used. If still tied, extra time was not played, and a penalty shoot-out was used to determine the winner (Regulations Article 2.4.2).
- The final was played as a single match at a venue pre-selected by CONMEBOL, with the higher-seeded team designated as the "home" team for administrative purposes (Regulations Article 2.2.2.3). If tied after regulation, 30 minutes of extra time was played. If still tied after extra time, a penalty shoot-out was used to determine the winner (Regulations Article 2.4.3).

=== Seeding ===
Starting from the round of 16, the teams are seeded according to the second stage draw, with each team assigned a "seed" 1–16 corresponding to the tie they win (O1–O16) (Regulations Article 2.2.2.1).

=== Bracket ===
The bracket was decided based on the second stage draw, which was held on 23 October 2020.

Round of 16
12	(Argentina) Vélez Sarsfield	2	5	7
5	(Colombia) Deportivo Cali	0	1	1
13	(Uruguay) River Plate	1	1	2
4	(Chile) Universidad Católica (a)	2	0	2
9	(Bolivia) Bolívar	2	2	4
8	(Argentina) Lanús	1	6	7
16	(Uruguay) Fénix	1	0	1
1	(Argentina) Independiente	4	1	5
14	(Colombia) Junior (p)	2	1	3 (4)
3	(Chile) Unión La Calera	1	2	3 (2)
11	(Chile) Coquimbo Unido	0	2	2
6	(Peru) Sport Huancayo	0	0	0
15	(Brazil) Bahia	1	0	1
2	(Argentina) Unión	0	0	0
10	(Argentina) Defensa y Justicia	1	1	2
7	(Brazil) Vasco da Gama	1	0	1

Quarter-finals
12	(Argentina) Vélez Sarsfield	1	3	4
4	(Chile) Universidad Católica	2	1	3
8	(Argentina) Lanús	0	3	3
1	(Argentina) Independiente	0	1	1
14	(Colombia) Junior	1	1	2
11	(Chile) Coquimbo Unido (a)	2	0	2
15	(Brazil) Bahia	2	0	2
10	(Argentina) Defensa y Justicia	3	1	4

Semi-finals
12	(Argentina) Vélez Sarsfield	0	0	0
8	(Argentina) Lanús	1	3	4
11	(Chile) Coquimbo Unido	0	2	2
10	(Argentina) Defensa y Justicia	0	4	4

Final
23 January 2021 – Córdoba
8	(Argentina) Lanús	0
10	(Argentina) Defensa y Justicia	3

=== Round of 16 ===
Team 1	Agg.	Team 2	1st leg	2nd leg
Fénix (Uruguay)	1–5	(Argentina) Independiente	1–4	0–1
Bahia (Brazil)	1–0	(Argentina) Unión	1–0	0–0
Junior (Colombia)	3–3 (4–2 p)	(Chile) Unión La Calera	2–1	1–2
River Plate (Uruguay)	2–2 (a)	(Chile) Universidad Católica	1–2	1–0
Vélez Sarsfield (Argentina)	7–1	(Colombia) Deportivo Cali	2–0	5–1
Coquimbo Unido (Chile)	2–0	(Peru) Sport Huancayo	0–0	2–0
Defensa y Justicia (Argentina)	2–1	(Brazil) Vasco da Gama	1–1	1–0
Bolívar (Bolivia)	4–7	(Argentina) Lanús	2–1	2–6

=== Quarter-finals ===
Team 1	Agg.	Team 2	1st leg	2nd leg
Lanús (Argentina)	3–1	(Argentina) Independiente	0–0	3–1
Bahia (Brazil)	2–4	(Argentina) Defensa y Justicia	2–3	0–1
Junior (Colombia)	2–2 (a)	(Chile) Coquimbo Unido	1–2	1–0
Vélez Sarsfield (Argentina)	4–3	(Chile) Universidad Católica	1–2	3–1

=== Semi-finals ===
Team 1	Agg.	Team 2	1st leg	2nd leg
Vélez Sarsfield (Argentina)	0–4	(Argentina) Lanús	0–1	0–3
Coquimbo Unido (Chile)	2–4	(Argentina) Defensa y Justicia	0–0	2–4

=== Final ===
23 January 2021
17:00 UTC−3

Lanús (Argentina)	0–3	(Argentina) Defensa y Justicia
	Report	Frías 34'; Romero 62'; Camacho 90+2'

Estadio Mario Alberto Kempes, Córdoba
Attendance: 0
Referee: Jesús Valenzuela (Venezuela) (Note: Referee Leodán González from Uruguay, who was originally assigned to the final match, was replaced by Jesús Valenzuela from Venezuela.)

== Statistics ==
=== Top scorers ===
Rank	Player	Team	1S1	1S2	2S1	2S2	⅛F1	⅛F2	QF1	QF2	SF1	SF2	F	Total
1	(Argentina) Braian Romero	(Argentina) Independiente (Argentina) Defensa y Justicia			1	1	1		2	1		3	1	10
2	(Brazil) Gilberto	(Brazil) Bahia	1	2		1	1		1					6
2	(Argentina) Nicolás Orsini	(Argentina) Lanús	2			1		1		1		1		6
4	(Argentina) Tomás Belmonte	(Argentina) Lanús					1	2		1		1		5
4	(Argentina) Lautaro Palacios	(Chile) Coquimbo Unido			1	1		1	1			1		5
6	(Argentina) Thiago Almada	(Argentina) Vélez Sarsfield		1		1	2							4
6	(Uruguay) Facundo Barceló	(Ecuador) Emelec	2		1	1								4
6	(Colombia) Miguel Borja	(Colombia) Junior					1	1	1	1				4
6	(Argentina) Silvio Romero	(Argentina) Independiente			1	1	1	1						4
6	(Argentina) José Sand	(Argentina) Lanús			2					1	1			4

Source: Worldfootball.net

== See also ==
- 2020 Copa Libertadores
- 2021 Recopa Sudamericana
