= Pablo Aranda =

Pablo Aranda may refer to:

- Pablo Aranda (footballer) (born 2001), Argentine right-back
- Pablo Aranda (writer) (1968–2020), Spanish writer
