= Thomas Rodríguez =

Chilean-Argentine footballer (born 1996)

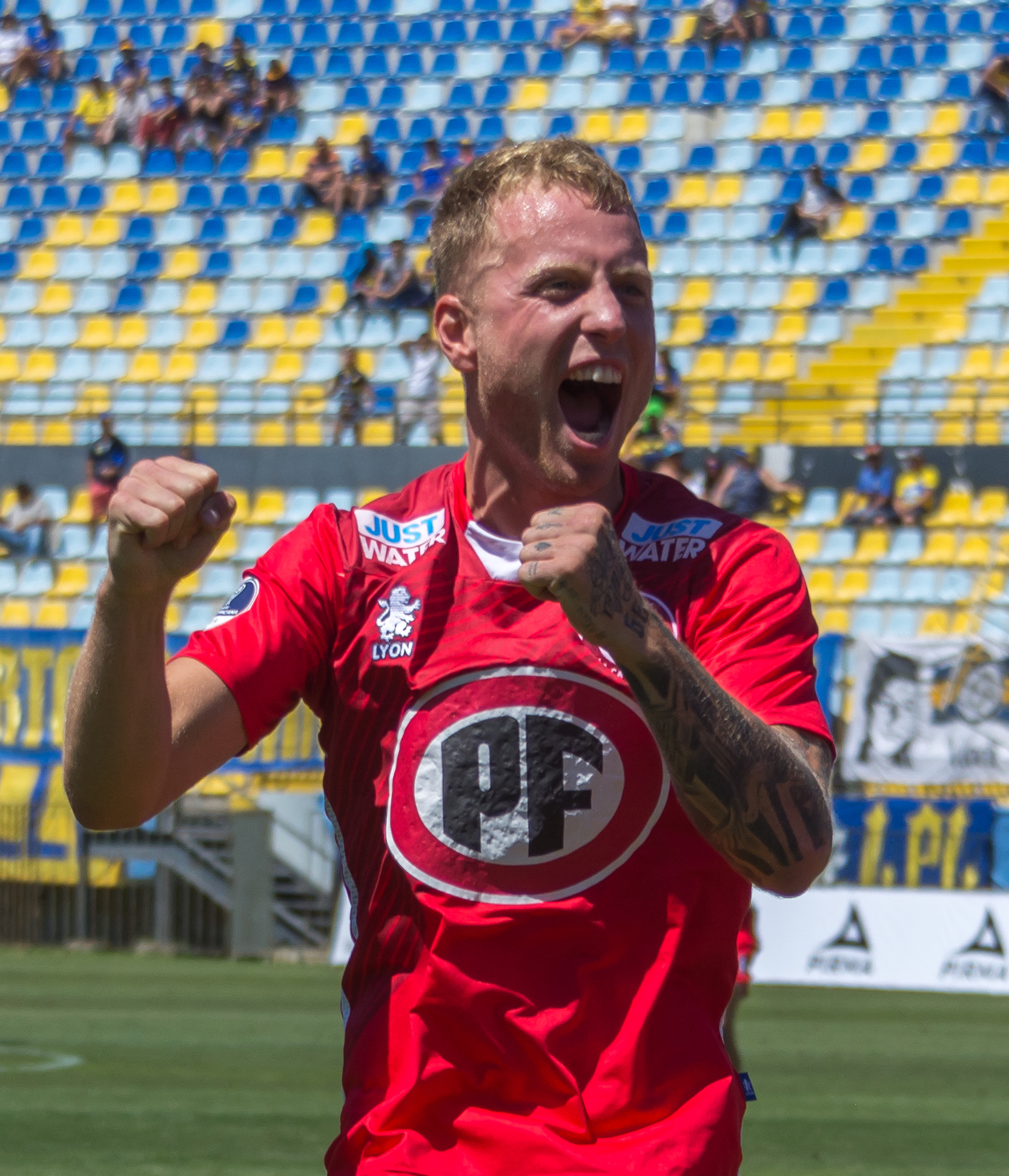
- Rodríguez with Unión La Calera in 2019

Personal information
- Full name: Thomas Rodríguez Trogsar
- Date of birth: 5 April 1996 (age 30)
- Place of birth: Santiago, Chile
- Height: 1.83 m (6 ft 0 in)
- Position: Right midfielder

Team information
- Current team: Banfield
- Number: 77

Youth career
- River Plate
- 2014: Vélez Sarsfield
- 2015: Banfield

Senior career*
Years	Team	Apps	(Gls)
2015–2017	Banfield	21	(0)
2017–2019	Genoa	0	(0)
2018	→ Vitória Setúbal (loan)	0	(0)
2018–2019	→ Unión La Calera (loan)	19	(3)
2019–2021	Unión La Calera	33	(5)
2021	Universidad de Chile	18	(0)
2022	Unión La Calera	13	(0)
2023	Unión Española	9	(0)
2024	Audax Italiano	11	(0)
2024	Burgos	2	(0)
2025	Juventud Las Piedras	24	(0)
2026–	Banfield	3	(0)
- * Club domestic league appearances and goals as of 17:58, 8 November 2026 (UTC)

Thomas Rodríguez Trogsar (born 5 April 1996) is a Chilean professional footballer who plays as a right midfielder for Argentine club Banfield.

== Career ==
Rodríguez had spells with River Plate and Vélez Sarsfield in his youth career prior to joining Banfield. His professional career got started in 2015 with Banfield of the Argentine Primera División. He made his debut on 1 November, coming on as a second-half substitute in a league defeat to Rosario Central. In July 2017, Rodríguez joined Italian football by signing for Serie A side Genoa. After making his Genoa debut in the Coppa Italia on 30 November 2017 versus Crotone, Rodríguez left the club on loan in January 2018 to join Vitória Setúbal of the Primeira Liga. He didn't make a senior appearance in six months with the club.

On 9 August 2018, Chilean Primera División's Unión La Calera completed the loan signing of Rodríguez. He scored his first senior goal against Deportes Antofagasta on 18 August. Overall, Rodríguez netted three goals in twenty games for them. He returned to his parent team on 30 June. Rodríguez had interest from other Chilean teams upon returning to Genoa, though the ANFP prevented the right midfielder from joining another top-flight outfit as it went against league rules regarding multiple contracts in a single campaign; his father and agent Leonardo appealed the ruling. He terminated his Genoa contract in August.

In August 2019, Rodríguez rejoined Unión La Calera on a free transfer. In 2023, Rodríguez played for Unión Española, and switched to Audax Italiano the following year.

On 29 August 2024, Rodríguez moved to Spanish Segunda División side Burgos CF.

In 2025, Rodríguez returned to South America and signed with Uruguayan club Juventud Las Piedras. The next year, he returned to Banfield.

== Personal life ==
He is the son of former Argentine international footballer Leonardo Rodríguez, who is a historical player of Universidad de Chile.

== Career statistics ==
As of 13 February 2021.

Club statistics
Club	Season	League			Cup		Continental		Other		Total	
Club	Season	Division	Apps	Goals	Apps	Goals	Apps	Goals	Apps	Goals	Apps	Goals
Banfield	2015	Argentine; Primera División	1	0	0	0	—		0	0	1	0
Banfield	2016	Argentine; Primera División	8	0	1 (Note: Appearance(s) in the Copa Argentina)	0	—		0	0	9	0
Banfield	2016–17	Argentine; Primera División	12	0	0	0	0	0	1 (Note: Appearance(s) in Torneo de Verano)	0	13	0
Banfield	Total		21	0	1	0	0	0	1	0	23	0
Genoa	2017–18	Serie A	0	0	1 (Note: Appearance(s) in the Coppa Italia)	0	—		0	0	1	0
Genoa	2018–19	Serie A	0	0	0	0	—		0	0	0	0
Genoa	Total		0	0	1	0	—		0	0	1	0
Vitória Setúbal (loan)	2017–18	Primeira Liga	0	0	—		—		0	0	0	0
Unión La Calera (loan)	2018	Chilean; Primera División	8	1	0	0	—		0	0	8	1
Unión La Calera (loan)	2019	Chilean; Primera División	11	2	1	0	2 (Note: Appearance(s) in the Copa Sudamericana)	0	0	0	14	2
Unión La Calera	2019	Chilean; Primera División	5	1	2	0	—		0	0	7	1
Unión La Calera	2020	Chilean; Primera División	28	4	—		4	0	0	0	32	4
Unión La Calera	Total		52	8	3 (Note: Appearance(s) in the Copa Chile)	0	6	0	0	0	61	8
Universidad de Chile	2021	Chilean; Primera División	0	0	0	0	0 (Note: Appearance(s) in the Copa Libertadores)	0	0	0	0	0
Career total			73	8	5	0	6	0	1	0	85	8
