= Abraham Cabrera =

Bolivian footballer (born 1991)

Personal information
- Full name: Abraham Cabrera Scapin
- Date of birth: 20 February 1991 (age 35)
- Place of birth: Santa Cruz de la Sierra, Bolivia
- Height: 1.80 m (5 ft 11 in)
- Position: Left back

Team information
- Current team: GV San José
- Number: 20

Youth career
- –2011: Bolívar

Senior career*
Years	Team	Apps	(Gls)
2011–2013	Bolívar	6	(0)
2012–2013	→ La Paz (loan)	24	(2)
2013–2016	The Strongest	41	(4)
2016–2017	Guabirá	24	(0)
2017	Universitario de Sucre	17	(0)
2018	Oriente Petrolero	1	(0)
2019	Real Potosí	34	(4)
2020	Nacional Potosí	24	(0)
2021–2023	Blooming	63	(3)
2024	Nacional Potosí	12	(0)
2025–	GV San José	1	(0)

International career
2013–2015	Bolivia	3	(0)
- * Club domestic league appearances and goals as of 30 December 2025

Abraham Cabrera Scapin (born 20 February 1991) is a Bolivian footballer who plays as a left back for GV San José.

== International career ==
Cabrera made his debut for Bolivia in an August 2013 friendly match against Venezuela and has, as of 1 June 2016, earned 3 caps, scoring no goals. He represented his country in 2 FIFA World Cup qualification matches.
