= Paulo Lima (footballer, born 1992) =

Uruguayan footballer

Personal information
- Full name: Paulo Fabián Lima Simões
- Date of birth: 20 January 1992 (age 34)
- Place of birth: Montevideo, Uruguay
- Height: 1.82 m (6 ft 0 in)
- Position: Centre-back

Team information
- Current team: Montevideo Wanderers
- Number: 2

Senior career*
| Years | Team | Apps | (Gls) |
| 2013–2014 | Huracán | 7 | (0) |
| 2014–2020 | Montevideo Wanderers | 71 | (1) |
| 2016–2017 | → Tigre (loan) | 19 | (0) |
| 2018–2020 | → Sportivo Luqueño (loan) | 59 | (1) |
| 2021–2022 | Deportivo Maldonado | 24 | (1) |
| 2022 | Central Córdoba SdE | 3 | (0) |
| 2023 | Guaireña | 14 | (2) |
| 2023 | Tacuary | 12 | (1) |
| 2024– | Montevideo Wanderers | 1 | (0) |
- * Club domestic league appearances and goals as of 7 September 2024

Paulo Fabián Lima Simoes (born 20 January 1992) is an Uruguayan footballer who plays for Montevideo Wanderers.
