= Diego Aravena =

Chilean footballer (born 1996)

Personal information
- Full name: Diego Sebastián Aravena Ramírez
- Date of birth: December 30, 1996 (age 29)
- Place of birth: Santiago, Chile
- Height: 1.78 m (5 ft 10 in)
- Position: Central midfielder

Team information
- Current team: Audax Italiano

Youth career
- –2014: Magallanes

Senior career*
Years	Team	Apps	(Gls)
2014–2018	Magallanes	95	(5)
2019–2021	Coquimbo Unido	30	(2)
2021–	Audax Italiano	0	(0)
- * Club domestic league appearances and goals as of 14 February 2021

Diego Sebastián Aravena Ramírez (born December 30, 1996) is a Chilean footballer who currently plays as central midfielder for club Audax Italiano.

== Career statistics ==
=== Club ===
As of 14 February 2021.

Club	Season	League			Cup		Continental		Other		Total	
Club	Season	Division	Apps	Goals	Apps	Goals	Apps	Goals	Apps	Goals	Apps	Goals
Magallanes	2013–14	Primera B	1	0	0	0	—		0	0	1	0
Magallanes	2014–15	Primera B	10	0	5	1	—		0	0	15	1
Magallanes	2015–16	Primera B	27	0	4	0	—		0	0	31	0
Magallanes	2016–17	Primera B	16	0	0	0	—		0	0	16	0
Magallanes	2017–T	Primera B	15	2	2	0	—		0	0	17	2
Magallanes	2018	Primera B	26	3	4	0	—		0	0	30	3
Magallanes	Total		95	5	15	1	—		0	0	110	6
Coquimbo Unido	2019	Primera División	1	0	1	0	—		0	0	2	0
Coquimbo Unido	2020	Primera División	29	2	—		10	1	0	0	39	3
Coquimbo Unido	Total		30	2	1	0	10 (Note: Appearances in the Copa Sudamericana)	1	0	0	41	3
Audax Italiano	2021	Primera División	0	0	0	0	—		0	0	0	0
Total career			125	7	16 (Note: Appearances in the Copa Chile)	1	10	1	0	0	151	9
