= Lautaro Palacios =

Argentine footballer

Personal information
- Full name: Lautaro Agustín Palacios
- Date of birth: 29 May 1995 (age 31)
- Place of birth: La Plata, Argentina
- Height: 1.77 m (5 ft 10 in)
- Position: Striker

Team information
- Current team: Deportes Copiapó

Youth career
- DIVE Villa Elisa
- Curuzú Cuatiá

Senior career*
Years	Team	Apps	(Gls)
2011–2014	Curuzú Cuatiá	–	(–)
2013	→ Argentino Juvenil (loan)	–	(–)
2015	Everton LP	1	(1)
2016	San Lorenzo VC	–	(–)
2016–2017	Curuzú Cuatiá	–	(–)
2017–2018	Cambaceres	50	(12)
2019–2021	Unión San Felipe	34	(10)
2020–2021	→ Coquimbo Unido (loan)	16	(4)
2021–2025	Audax Italiano	91	(27)
2022–2023	→ Al-Adalah (loan)	12	(1)
2026–	Deportes Copiapó	0	(0)
- * Club domestic league appearances and goals as of 22 December 2025

Lautaro Agustín Palacios (born 29 May 1995) is an Argentine professional footballer who plays as a striker for Deportes Copiapó.

== Career ==
Palacios was born in La Plata, Argentina. A product of both DIVE and Centro de Fomento Social, Cultural y Deportivo Curuzú Cuatiá from Villa Elisa, as a young player, Palacios played for amateur teams at the Liga Platense, until he joined Argentine Primera D club Defensores de Cambaceres. In 2019, he moved to Chile and joined Chilean Primera B club Unión San Felipe, being loaned to Chilean Primera División club Coquimbo Unido on second half 2020. Along with Coquimbo Unido, he has played at the 2020 Copa Sudamericana, scoring a goal in his debut.

On 2021 season, he was transferred to Audax Italiano on a deal for four years. On 4 July 2022, Palacios joined Saudi Arabian club Al-Adalah on loan.

In January 2026, Palacios joined Deportes Copiapó.

== Personal life ==
Palacios is nicknamed Tanque (Tank).
