= Agustín Ocampo =

Uruguayan football player (born 1997)

Personal information
- Full name: Lucas Agustín Ocampo Galván
- Date of birth: 23 November 1997 (age 28)
- Place of birth: Paso de los Toros, Uruguay
- Height: 1.65 m (5 ft 5 in)
- Position: Midfielder

Team information
- Current team: Progreso (on loan from Platense)
- Number: 7

Senior career*
Years	Team	Apps	(Gls)
2018–2020	Liverpool Montevideo	72	(11)
2021–2023	Deportes Antofagasta	11	(0)
2022	→ Racing Montevideo (loan)	16	(2)
2022	→ Defensor Sporting (loan)	15	(2)
2023	→ Fénix (loan)	22	(11)
2023–	Platense	45	(1)
2025	→ Plaza Colonia (loan)	28	(2)
2026–	→ Progreso (loan)	10	(1)
- * Club domestic league appearances and goals as of 17:48, 4 October 2026 (UTC)

Lucas Agustín Ocampo Galván (born 23 November 1997) is a Uruguayan footballer who plays as a midfielder for Progreso, on loan from Argentine club Platense.

== Career ==
A graduate of the club's youth academy, Ocampo made his league debut for Liverpool Montevideo on 21 July 2018, coming on as a 79th-minute substitute for Federico Martínez in a 1–1 draw with Cerro. He scored his first goal for the club the following season, netting in the 40th minute of a 3–1 victory over Montevideo Wanderers.

In May 2021, Ocampo joined Chilean club Antofagasta after being released from Liverpool.

== Career statistics ==
=== Club ===
As of match played 4 January 2021

Appearances and goals by club, season and competition
Club	Season	League			Cup		Continental (Note: Includes Copa Sudamericana and Copa Libertadores)		Other (Note: Includes Torneo Intermedio Final and Championship Playoff)		Total	
Club	Season	Division	Apps	Goals	Apps	Goals	Apps	Goals	Apps	Goals	Apps	Goals
Liverpool Montevideo	2018	Uruguayan Primera División	16	0	—	—	—	—	—	—	16	0
Liverpool Montevideo	2019	Uruguayan Primera División	22	2	—	—	2	0	1	0	25	2
Liverpool Montevideo	2020	Uruguayan Primera División	34	9	1	0	4	2	1	0	40	11
Liverpool Montevideo	2021	Uruguayan Primera División	0	0	—	—	2	0	—	—	2	0
Liverpool Montevideo	Total		72	11	1	0	8	2	2	0	83	13
Antofagasta	2021	Chilean Primera División	0	0	—	—	—	—	—	—	0	0
Antofagasta	Total		0	0	—	—	—	—	—	—	0	0
Career total			72	11	1	0	8	2	2	0	83	13
