= Pablo Aranda (footballer) =

Argentine footballer (born 2001)

Personal information
- Full name: Pablo Ezequiel Aranda
- Date of birth: 16 May 2001 (age 25)
- Place of birth: Temperley, Argentina
- Height: 1.80 m (5 ft 11 in)
- Position: Right-back

Team information
- Current team: Lanús)

Youth career
- 2016–2020: Sportivo Ameliano (on loan from Lanús

Senior career*
Years	Team	Apps	(Gls)
2020–	Lanús	7	(0)
2022	→ San Martín SJ (loan)	16	(0)
2024–	→ Sportivo Ameliano (loan)	23	(1)

International career
2019	Argentina U18		
- * Club domestic league appearances and goals as of 13 August 2025

Pablo Ezequiel Aranda (born 16 May 2001) is an Argentine professional footballer who plays as a right-back for Sportivo Ameliano, on loan from Lanús.

== Club career ==
Aranda came through the youth ranks at Lanús, having joined in 2016. He was promoted into the first-team squad towards the end of 2020, initially appearing as an unused substitute for five matches; including twice in the Copa Libertadores second stage against São Paulo. Aranda made his senior debut on 20 November in the Copa de la Liga Profesional, with manager Luis Zubeldía substituting him on for the final forty minutes of a victory at La Bombonera against Boca Juniors. In January 2022 Aranda joined Primera Nacional club San Martín de San Juan on a loan deal until the end of the year.

== International career ==
Aranda represented Argentina's U18s at the 2019 COTIF Tournament.

== Career statistics ==
As of 21 November 2020.

Appearances and goals by club, season and competition
Club	Season	League			Cup		League Cup		Continental		Other		Total	
Club	Season	Division	Apps	Goals	Apps	Goals	Apps	Goals	Apps	Goals	Apps	Goals	Apps	Goals
Lanús	2020–21 (Note: Soccerway counts Copa de la Liga Profesional appearances as league appearances.)	Primera División	1	0	0	0	0	0	0	0	0	0	1	0
Career total			1	0	0	0	0	0	0	0	0	0	1	0
