= Rubén Farfán =

Chilean footballer (born 1991)

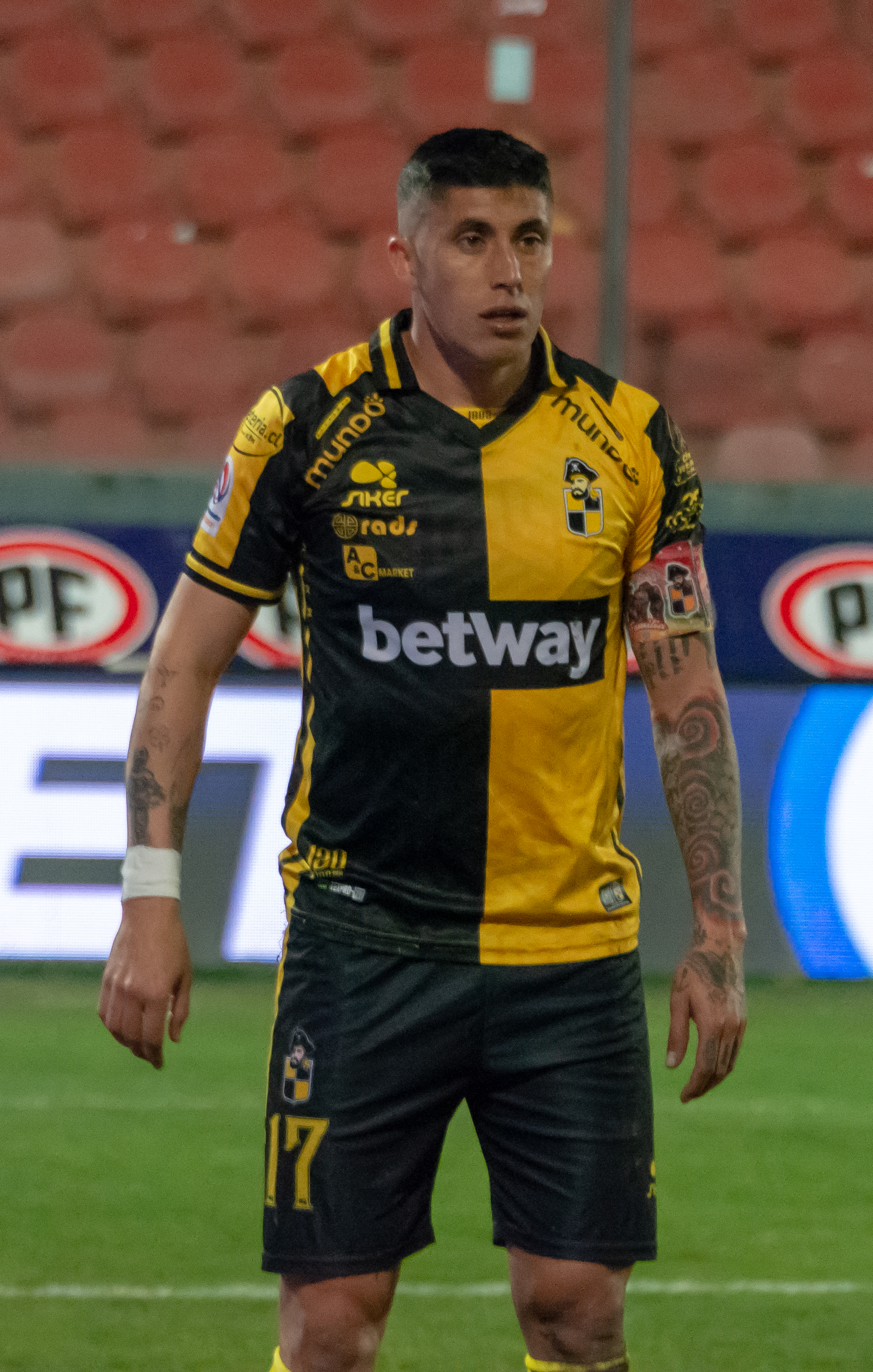
- Farfán with Coquimbo Unido in 2023

Personal information
- Full name: Rubén Ignacio Farfán Arancibia
- Date of birth: 25 September 1991 (age 35)
- Place of birth: Nogales, Chile
- Height: 1.74 m (5 ft 9 in)
- Position: Winger

Team information
- Current team: Magallanes
- Number: 20

Youth career
- Unión La Calera

Senior career*
Years	Team	Apps	(Gls)
2011–2013	Unión La Calera	17	(4)
2012	→ Deportes Santa Cruz (loan)	?	(18)
2013–2017	Universidad de Chile	31	(5)
2014–2015	→ Deportes Antofagasta (loan)	33	(5)
2016	→ Palestino (loan)	3	(0)
2016–2017	→ Santiago Wanderers (loan)	26	(5)
2017–2018	Deportes Temuco	35	(2)
2019–2023	Coquimbo Unido	108	(12)
2021	→ Unión Española (loan)	22	(1)
2024–2025	Deportes Iquique	29	(2)
2026–	Magallanes	1	(0)
- * Club domestic league appearances and goals as of 24 February 2026

Rubén Ignacio Farfán Arancibia (born 25 September 1991) is a Chilean footballer who plays as a winger for Magallanes.

== Career ==
Farfán signed with Deportes Iquique for the 2024 season. He left them at the end of 2025.

In February 2026, Farfán joined Magallanes.

== Personal life ==
He is the nephew of Gerson Martínez, another professional footballer who played for Colo-Colo and Chile U20.

He is nicknamed Rayo (Lightning Bolt) due to his speed.

== Honours ==
Deportes Santa Cruz

- Tercera B (1): 2012

Universidad de Chile

- Copa Chile (1): 2015
- Supercopa de Chile (1): 2015
