= Washington Camacho =

Uruguayan footballer (born 1986)

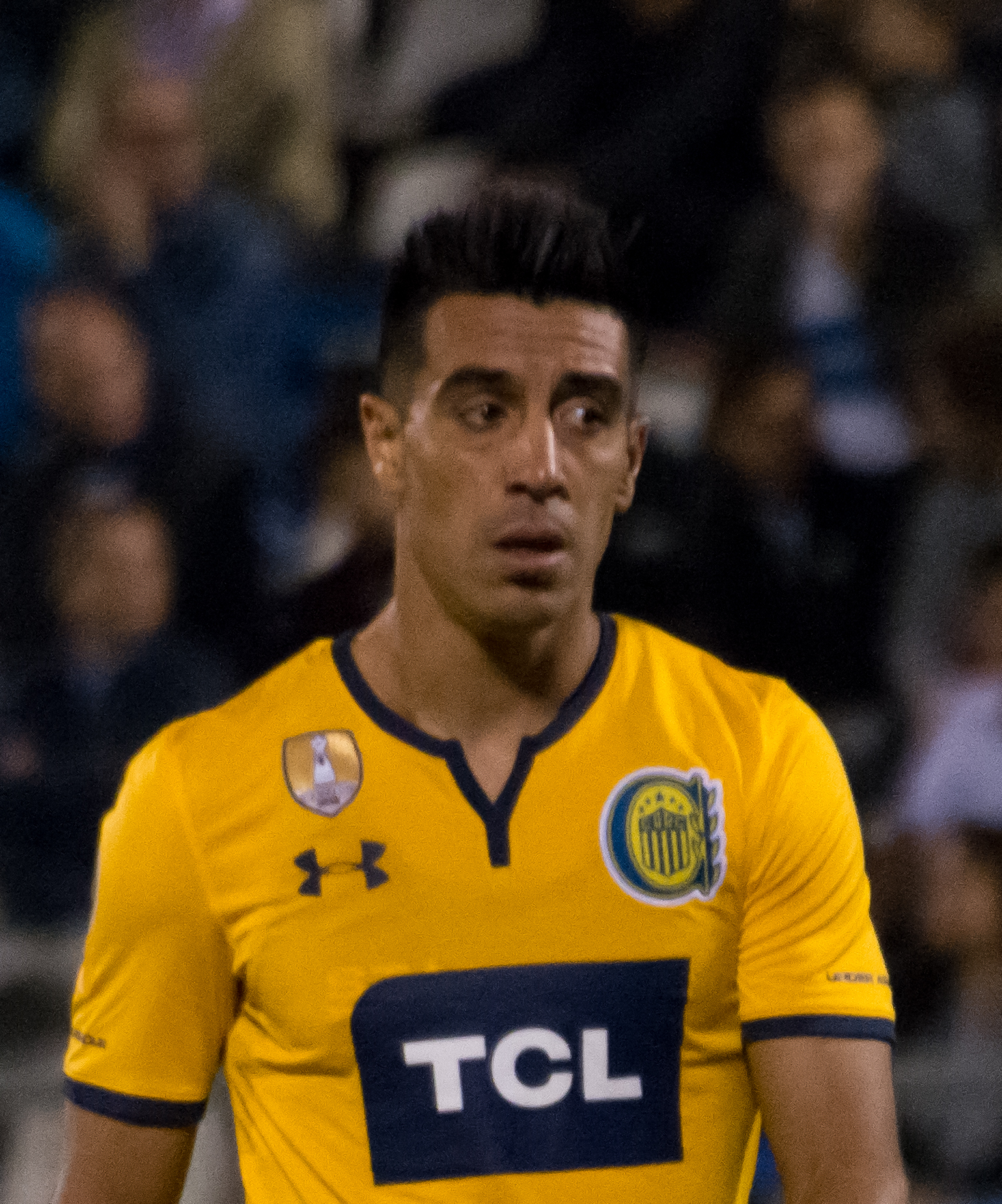

Personal information
- Full name: Washington Fernando Camacho
- Date of birth: 8 April 1986 (age 40)
- Place of birth: Paso de los Toros, Uruguay
- Height: 1.77 m (5 ft 10 in)
- Position: Left midfielder

Senior career*
| Years | Team | Apps | (Gls) |
| 2005–2007 | Rentistas | | |
| 2008 | Bella Vista | | |
| 2009–2010 | Juventud | | |
| 2010–2011 | El Tanque Sisley | 18 | (1) |
| 2011–2012 | Cerro | 19 | (0) |
| 2012–2013 | Godoy Cruz | 10 | (0) |
| 2013–2014 | Defensa y Justicia | 58 | (9) |
| 2014–2015 | Racing Club | 33 | (4) |
| 2016–2019 | Rosario Central | 66 | (11) |
| 2019–2020 | Tijuana | 11 | (2) |
| 2020–2021 | Defensa y Justicia | 9 | (2) |
| 2021 | Montevideo Wanderers | 0 | (0) |
- * Club domestic league appearances and goals

Washington Fernando Camacho (born 8 April 1986) is a Uruguayan former footballer. Besides Uruguay, he has played in Argentina and Mexico.

== Honours ==
Rosario Central

- Copa Argentina: 2017–18
