= Facundo Barceló =

Uruguayan footballer (born 1993)

Personal information
- Full name: Facundo Barceló Viera
- Date of birth: 31 March 1993 (age 33)
- Place of birth: Florida, Uruguay
- Height: 1.85 m (6 ft 1 in)
- Position: Forward

Team information
- Current team: CRB
- Number: 32

Youth career
- –2013: Liverpool

Senior career*
Years	Team	Apps	(Gls)
2013–2016	Liverpool	50	(13)
2015	→ El Tanque Sisley (loan)	11	(1)
2016–2022	Juventud	11	(6)
2016–2017	→ San Martín SJ (loan)	17	(5)
2017–2018	→ San Martín SJ (loan)	24	(5)
2018–2019	→ Patronato (loan)	11	(6)
2019	→ Atlas (loan)	28	(6)
2020–2021	→ Emelec (loan)	52	(20)
2022	→ O'Higgins (loan)	24	(6)
2023	Guaraní	32	(9)
2024	Ceará	31	(6)
2025	Goiás	19	(2)
2023–	CRB	6	(0)
- * Club domestic league appearances and goals as of 16 December 2025

Facundo Barceló Viera (Note: In this Spanish name, the first or paternal surname is Barceló and the second or maternal family name is Viera.) (born 31 March 1993), known as Facundo Barceló, is a Uruguayan footballer who plays as a forward for CRB. He previously played domestically for Liverpool and El Tanque Sisley.

== Life and career ==
Barceló was born in Florida, Uruguay. He came through the youth system at Montevideo-based club Liverpool, and made his first-team debut on 24 February 2013, aged 19, as a second-half substitute in a 1–0 opening-day defeat against Danubio in the Primera División. He scored his first goal in his fourth appearance, in a 3–3 draw away to Bella Vista, and in the next match, he scored a hat-trick to help his team beat River Plate 4–2. He finished the 2012–13 Clausura with five goals from twelve appearances, which made him the club's joint top scorer (with Paulo Pezzolano).

He scored six goals in the 2013–14 season, which ended in relegation to the Segunda División. After scoring once from five substitute appearances in the first half of the following season, Barceló joined El Tanque Sisley on a six-month loan. He played eleven matches and scored once, in a 4–2 defeat of Atenas on the final day of the 2015 Clausura; the result confirmed that El Tanque Sisley stayed in the Primera and their opponents were relegated.

In his absence, Liverpool had won the 2014–15 Segunda División title and returned to the Primera. Barceló made seven appearances (one start) in the 2015 Apertura, but in January 2016 he was allowed to leave for another Primera team, Juventud de Las Piedras. He made a scoring debut on the opening day of the campaign against Danubio, albeit in a losing cause, when a shot hit the crossbar and he headed home the rebound, scored again the following week with a penalty awarded when he himself was fouled, and finished the season as the club's top scorer with six goals from eleven appearances.

In August 2016, Barceló joined Argentine Primera División club San Martín de San Juan on loan with an option to purchase. He made his debut on 18 September as a second-half substitute in a 1–1 draw with River Plate in the Estadio Monumental, He top-scored (jointly with Emanuel Dening) for San Martín in the 2016–17 Primera División with five goals. Barceló was reported to be a transfer target for Chilean Primera División club O'Higgins in July 2017, but he signed a two-year contract extension with San Martín.

== Honours ==
Liverpool

- Uruguayan Segunda División: 2014–15

Ceará

- Campeonato Cearense: 2024
