= Estadio Alfredo Victor Viera =

Multi-purpose stadium in Montevideo, Uruguay

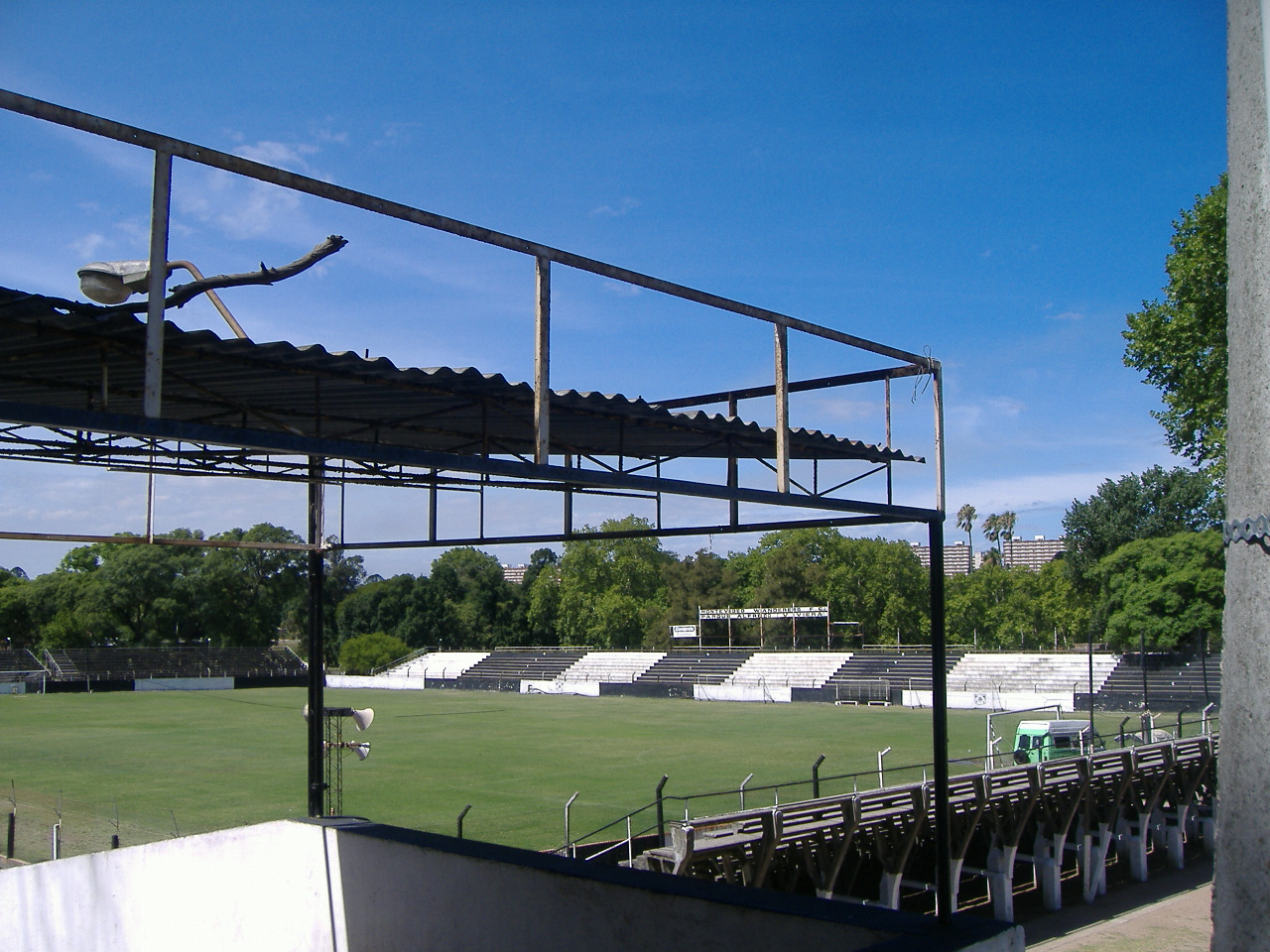
- Montevideo Wanderers's stadium in 2008
- Interactive map of Estadio Alfredo Victor Viera
- Full name: Estadio Parque Alfredo Víctor Viera
- Former names: Wanderers Park
- Location: Prado, Montevideo, Uruguay
- Coordinates: 34.859278°S 56.204027°W
- Owner: Montevideo Wanderers F.C.
- Capacity: 7,527
- Surface: grass

Tenant
- Montevideo Wanderers Fútbol Club

Estadio Parque Alfredo Víctor Viera is a multi-purpose stadium in Montevideo, Uruguay. It is the home of Montevideo Wanderers Fútbol Club, and is currently used solely for football matches. Presently the stadium holds 7,527 people and was built in 1933. It has 4 seating sections, named after great players of the team: Obdulio Varela, Cayetano Saporitti, René "Tito" Borjas and Jorge "Chifle" Barrios.

The stadium is located in the heart of the Prado neighborhood of Montevideo, in the intersection of Buschental Avenue and Atilio Pelossi Road.
