= Braian Romero =

Argentine footballer (born 1991)

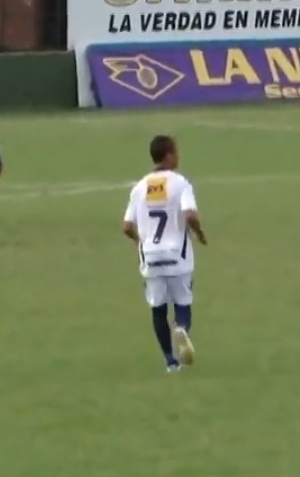

Personal information
- Full name: Braian Ezequiel Romero
- Date of birth: 15 June 1991 (age 35)
- Place of birth: San Isidro, Argentina
- Height: 1.80 m (5 ft 11 in)
- Position: Centre-forward

Team information
- Current team: Olimpia
- Number: 31

Senior career*
Years	Team	Apps	(Gls)
2011–2016	Acassuso	78	(9)
2015	→ Colón (loan)	20	(5)
2016–2017	Argentinos Juniors	66	(21)
2018–2021	Independiente	30	(5)
2019	→ Athletico Paranaense (loan)	16	(2)
2020–2021	→ Defensa y Justicia (loan)	31	(21)
2021–2022	River Plate	52	(15)
2022–2023	Internacional	18	(2)
2023	→ Tijuana (loan)	16	(1)
2023–2026	Velez Sarsfield	89	(28)
2026–	Olimpia	6	(1)
- * Club domestic league appearances and goals as of 16:33, 6 October 2026 (UTC)

Braian Ezequiel Romero (born 15 June 1991) is an Argentine professional footballer who plays as a centre-forward for Paraguayan Primera División club Olimpia.

== Career ==
=== Acassuso ===
Romero's first professional club were Acassuso of Primera B Metropolitana, making thirty-two appearances in his debut season while scoring four times; including his first against Colegiales. In total, he appeared in seventy-eight league fixtures for Acassuso between 2011–12 and 2014.

==== Colón (loan) ====
In January 2015, Romero joined Argentine Primera División team Colón on loan. He scored in his fourth match, earning Colón a 1–1 draw against Rosario Central. Four goals in fifteen fixtures followed.

=== Argentinos Juniors ===
On 10 January 2016, Romero completed a permanent transfer to fellow Primera División side Argentinos Juniors.

Argentinos were relegated to Primera B Nacional in his first season, he subsequently scored fifteen goals in forty-two matches in Primera B Nacional to help the club regain top-flight football for 2017–18.

=== Independiente ===
On 30 December 2017, Romero completed a transfer to Independiente. His first appearance for Independiente came versus Estudiantes on 29 January 2018, with his first goal arriving on 5 March against San Martín.

==== Athletico Paranaense (loan) ====
February 2019 saw Romero move to Brazil's Athletico Paranaense on loan. After a debut in a loss versus Fortaleza, he netted for the first time in Série A on 20 July in a four-goal win away to CSA.

Romero won the 2019 J.League Cup / Copa Sudamericana Championship and 2019 Copa do Brasil with Athletico Paranaense, notably scoring in the former during a 4–0 victory over Shonan Bellmare in Hiratsuka on 7 August. In total, he scored three goals in twenty-four matches. Back in Argentina, he appeared in six matches and scored one goal, versus Rosario Central, in 2019–20. September 2020 saw Romero join Defensa y Justicia on loan. He scored five in his first seven; netting in the Copa Libertadores over Delfín, Olimpia and Santos and in the Copa Sudamericana against Sportivo Luqueño (2).

==== Defensa y Justicia (loan) ====
On 16 January 2021, Romero scored a hat-trick as Defensa y Justicia defeated Coquimbo Unido in the Copa Sudamericana semi-finals; taking his tally in the competition for the club to nine goals in eight games. He then netted in the final against Lanús on 23 January, with Defensa defeating their domestic rivals to win their first Sudamericana title; the centre-forward finished as the top scorer with ten goals.

=== River Plate ===
On 7 July 2021, River Plate signed Romero on a three-and-a-half-year contract to replace the recently transferred Rafael Santos Borré.

== Career statistics ==
As of 20 August 2021

Appearances and goals by club, season and competition
Club	Season	League			National cup		League cup		Continental		Other		Total	
Club	Season	Division	Apps	Goals	Apps	Goals	Apps	Goals	Apps	Goals	Apps	Goals	Apps	Goals
Acassuso	2011–12	Primera B Metropolitana	32	4	0	0	—		—		—		32	4
Acassuso	2012–13	Primera B Metropolitana	11	1	0	0	—		—		—		11	1
Acassuso	2013–14	Primera B Metropolitana	14	0	0	0	—		—		—		14	0
Acassuso	2014	Primera B Metropolitana	21	4	0	0	—		—		—		21	4
Acassuso	Total		78	9	0	0	—		—		—		78	9
Colón (loan)	2015	Primera División	20	5	0	0	—		—		—		20	5
Argentinos Juniors	2016	Primera División	13	1	0	0	—		—		—		13	1
Argentinos Juniors	2016–17	Primera B Nacional	42	15	2	1	—		—		—		44	16
Argentinos Juniors	2017–18	Primera División	11	5	0	0	—		—		—		11	5
Argentinos Juniors	Total		66	21	2	1	—		—		—		68	22
Independiente	2017–18	Primera División	7	1	0	0	—		2 (Note: Appearance(s) in the Copa Libertadores)	0	—		9	1
Independiente	2018–19	Primera División	12	3	2	0	0	0	2	0	—		16	3
Independiente	2019–20	Primera División	5	1	0	0	0	0	1 (Note: Appearance(s) in the Copa Sudamericana)	0	—		6	1
Independiente	2020–21	Primera División	0	0	0	0	0	0	0	0	—		0	0
Independiente	2021	Primera División	0	0	0	0	—		0	0	—		0	0
Independiente	Total		24	5	2	0	0	0	5	0	—		31	5
Athletico Paranaense (loan)	2019	Série A	16	2	2	0	—		4	0	2 (Note: Appearance(s) in the Recopa Sudamericana and J.League Cup / Copa Sudamericana Championship)	1	24	3
Defensa y Justicia (loan)	2020–21	Primera División	6	1	1	0	1	0	13 (Note: Four appearances and three goals in the Copa Libertadores and nine appearances and ten goals Copa Sudamericana)	13	—		21	14
Defensa y Justicia (loan)	2021	Primera División	8	2	0	0	—		3	3	2 (Note: Appearance(s) in the Recopa Sudamericana)	2	13	7
Defensa y Justicia (loan)	Total		14	3	1	0	1	0	16	16	2	2	34	21
River Plate	2021	Primera División	21	10	1	0	—		4	2	—		26	12
River Plate	2022	Primera División	19	3	2	0	—		5	0	—		26	3
River Plate	Total		40	13	3	0	0	0	9	2	0	0	52	15
Internacional	2022	Série A	1	0	—		—		0	0	—		1	0
Career total			259	58	10	1	1	0	34	18	4	3	308	80

== Honours ==
Argentinos Juniors

- Primera B Nacional: 2016–17

Athletico Paranaense

- J.League Cup / Copa Sudamericana Championship: 2019
- Copa do Brasil: 2019

Defensa y Justicia

- Copa Sudamericana: 2020
- Recopa Sudamericana: 2021

River Plate

- Argentine Primera División: 2021

Vélez Sarsfield

- Argentine Primera División: 2024
- Supercopa Internacional: 2024
