= Nicolás Orsini =

Argentine footballer

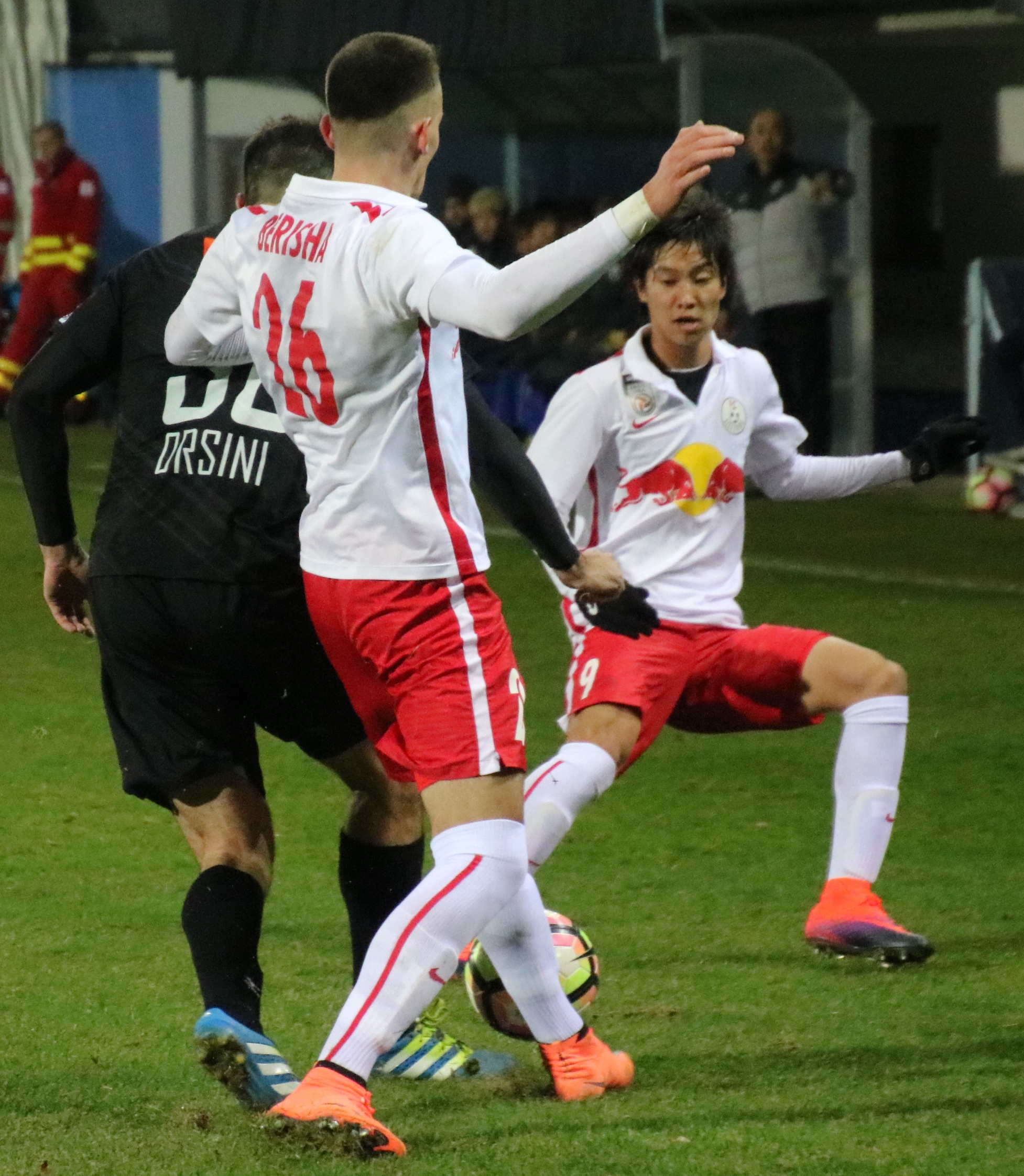
- Orsini with SV Horn in 2016

Personal information
- Full name: Nicolás Orsini
- Date of birth: September 12, 1994 (age 32)
- Place of birth: Morteros, Argentina
- Height: 1.91 m (6 ft 3 in)
- Position: Forward

Team information
- Current team: Barracas Central

Senior career*
Years	Team	Apps	(Gls)
2012–2013	Tiro Federal		
2013–2016	Atlético de Rafaela	31	(3)
2016–2018	Tokushima Vortis	0	(0)
2016	→ FC Anyang (loan)	7	(1)
2016–2017	→ SV Horn (loan)	27	(2)
2017	→ Fagiano Okayama (loan)	12	(1)
2018	→ Sportivo Luqueño (loan)	16	(4)
2018–2019	Sarmiento	29	(11)
2019–2021	Lanús	39	(5)
2021–2026	Boca Juniors	27	(1)
2023–2024	→ Unión Santa Fe (loan)	47	(6)
2025	→ Platense (loan)	20	(1)
2026–	Barracas Central	0	(0)
- * Club domestic league appearances and goals as of 18:14, 3 August 2026 (UTC)

Nicolas Orsini (born September 9, 1994) is an Argentine professional footballer who plays as a striker for Barracas Central.

== Club statistics ==
Updated to 20 February 2017.

Club performance			League		Cup		Total	
Season	Club	League	Apps	Goals	Apps	Goals	Apps	Goals
Japan			League		Emperor's Cup		Total	
2016	Tokushima Vortis	J2 League	0	0	0	0	0	0
2017	Fagiano Okayama	J2 League	0	0	0	0	0	0
Total			0	0	0	0	0	0

== Honours ==
Boca Juniors

- Primera División: 2022
- Copa Argentina: 2019–20
- Copa de la Liga Profesional: 2022
- Supercopa Argentina: 2022

Platense

- Argentine Primera División: 2025 Apertura
